= Elections in Indiana =

Elections in Indiana are held to fill various local, state and federal seats. Special elections may be held to fill vacancies at other points in time.

In a 2020 study, Indiana was ranked as the 10th hardest state for citizens to vote in.

== Elections by year ==
2027

- 2027 Indianapolis mayoral election

2026

- 2026 Indiana elections

2024

- 2024 Indiana elections

2023

- 2023 Indianapolis mayoral election
- 2023 Indianapolis City-County Council election

2022

- 2022 Indiana elections

2020

- 2020 Indiana elections

2019

- 2019 Indianapolis mayoral election
- 2019 Indianapolis City-County Council election

2018

- 2018 Indiana elections

2016

- 2016 Indiana elections

2015

- 2015 Indianapolis mayoral election
- 2015 Indianapolis City-County Council election

2014

- 2014 Indiana elections

2012

- 2012 United States presidential election in Indiana
- 2012 United States Senate election in Indiana
- 2012 United States House of Representatives elections in Indiana
- 2012 Indiana gubernatorial election

2011

- 2011 Indianapolis mayoral election
- 2011 Indianapolis City-County Council election

2010

- 2010 Indiana elections

2008

March 11:

- 2008 Indiana's 7th congressional district special election

May 6:

- 2008 Indiana Democratic primary
- 2008 Indiana Republican primary

November 4:

- 2008 Indiana gubernatorial election
- 2008 United States House of Representatives elections in Indiana
- 2008 United States presidential election in Indiana

2007

- 2007 Indianapolis mayoral election
- 2007 Indianapolis City-County Council election

2006

- 2006 Indiana elections

2004

- 2004 Indiana elections

2002

- 2002 Indiana elections

== Election dates ==
United States presidential election results for Indiana
Year	Republican / Whig		Democratic		Third party(ies)	
Year	No.	%	No.	%	No.	%
1824	3,095	19.65%	7,343	46.61%	5,315	33.74%
1828	17,052	43.38%	22,257	56.62%	0	0.00%
1832	15,472	32.90%	31,551	67.10%	0	0.00%
1836	41,281	55.97%	32,478	44.03%	0	0.00%
1840	65,302	55.86%	51,604	44.14%	0	0.00%
1844	67,867	48.42%	70,181	50.07%	2,106	1.50%
1848	69,907	45.77%	74,745	48.93%	8,100	5.30%
1852	80,901	44.17%	95,340	52.05%	6,929	3.78%
1856	94,375	40.09%	118,670	50.41%	22,386	9.51%
1860	139,033	51.09%	115,509	42.44%	17,601	6.47%
1864	150,422	53.60%	130,233	46.40%	0	0.00%
1868	176,552	51.39%	166,980	48.61%	0	0.00%
1872	186,147	53.00%	163,632	46.59%	1,417	0.40%
1876	208,011	47.39%	213,526	48.65%	17,374	3.96%
1880	232,164	49.33%	225,522	47.91%	12,986	2.76%
1884	238,489	48.15%	245,005	49.46%	11,838	2.39%
1888	263,361	49.05%	261,013	48.61%	12,575	2.34%
1892	255,615	46.17%	262,740	47.46%	35,258	6.37%
1896	323,754	50.82%	305,573	47.96%	7,792	1.22%
1900	336,063	50.60%	309,584	46.62%	18,447	2.78%
1904	368,289	53.99%	274,345	40.22%	39,551	5.80%
1908	348,993	48.40%	338,262	46.91%	33,871	4.70%
1912	151,267	23.11%	281,890	43.07%	221,317	33.82%
1916	341,005	47.44%	334,063	46.47%	43,780	6.09%
1920	696,370	55.14%	511,364	40.49%	55,230	4.37%
1924	703,042	55.25%	492,245	38.69%	77,103	6.06%
1928	848,290	59.68%	562,691	39.59%	10,333	0.73%
1932	677,184	42.94%	862,054	54.67%	37,689	2.39%
1936	691,570	41.89%	934,974	56.63%	24,353	1.48%
1940	899,466	50.45%	874,063	49.03%	9,218	0.52%
1944	875,891	52.38%	781,403	46.73%	14,797	0.88%
1948	821,079	49.58%	807,833	48.78%	27,302	1.65%
1952	1,136,259	58.11%	801,530	40.99%	17,536	0.90%
1956	1,182,811	59.90%	783,908	39.70%	7,888	0.40%
1960	1,175,120	55.03%	952,358	44.60%	7,882	0.37%
1964	911,118	43.56%	1,170,848	55.98%	9,640	0.46%
1968	1,067,885	50.29%	806,659	37.99%	249,053	11.73%
1972	1,405,154	66.11%	708,568	33.34%	11,807	0.56%
1976	1,183,958	53.32%	1,014,714	45.70%	21,690	0.98%
1980	1,255,656	56.01%	844,197	37.65%	142,180	6.34%
1984	1,377,230	61.67%	841,481	37.68%	14,358	0.64%
1988	1,297,763	59.84%	860,643	39.69%	10,215	0.47%
1992	989,375	42.91%	848,420	36.79%	468,076	20.30%
1996	1,006,693	47.13%	887,424	41.55%	241,725	11.32%
2000	1,245,836	56.65%	901,980	41.01%	51,486	2.34%
2004	1,479,438	59.94%	969,011	39.26%	19,553	0.79%
2008	1,345,648	48.81%	1,374,039	49.84%	36,971	1.34%
2012	1,422,872	54.04%	1,154,275	43.84%	55,996	2.13%
2016	1,557,286	56.42%	1,033,126	37.43%	169,963	6.16%
2020	1,729,863	56.91%	1,242,505	40.87%	67,413	2.22%
2024	1,720,347	58.43%	1,163,603	39.52%	60,384	2.05%

Except in special circumstances, all of Indiana's federal, state, and municipal elections occur on Election Day, being the first Tuesday following the first Monday of November. Except for members of the Indiana House of Representatives, all other elected state and municipal officials serve terms of four years.

The state's first elections were held on August 10, 1816. Thereafter, elections occurred on the first Monday of October, until 1852, when elections began to be held on Election Day.

== See also ==
- Political party strength in Indiana
- United States presidential elections in Indiana
