= 1876 United States presidential election in Indiana =

- November 7, 1876
- Turnout: 94.6% ▲9.3 pp
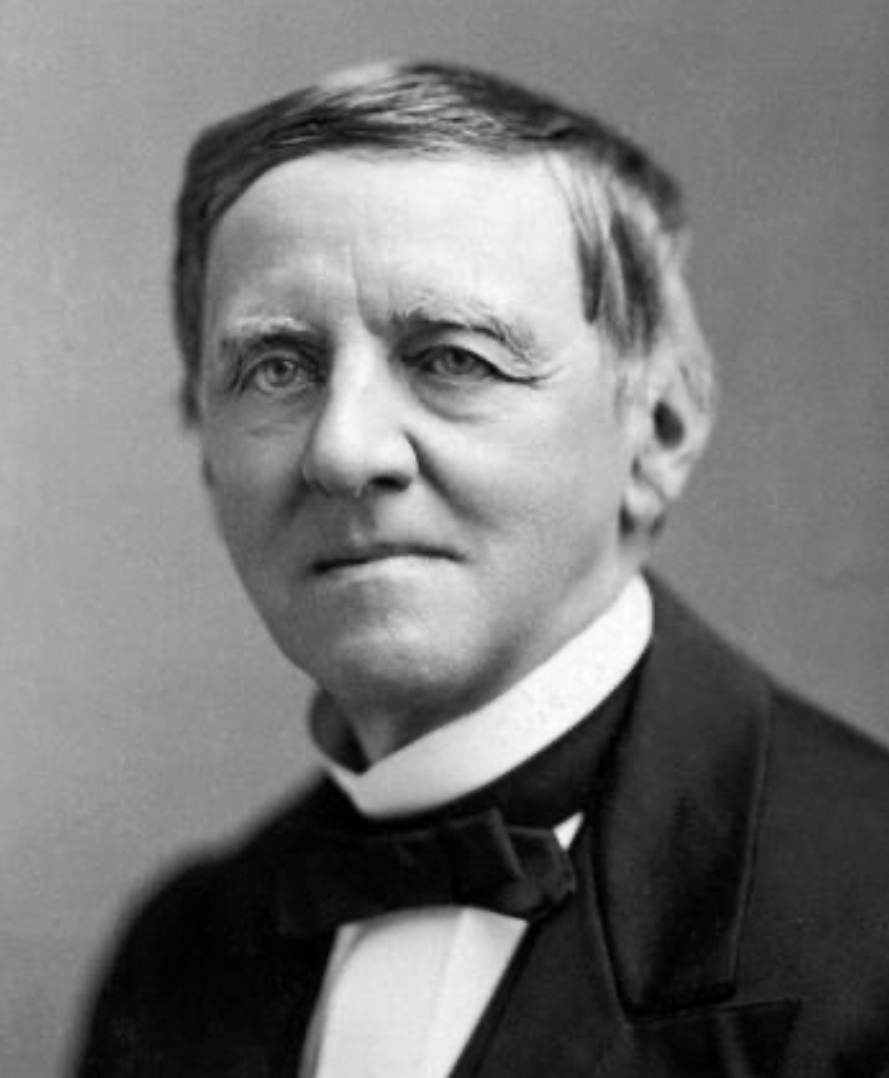

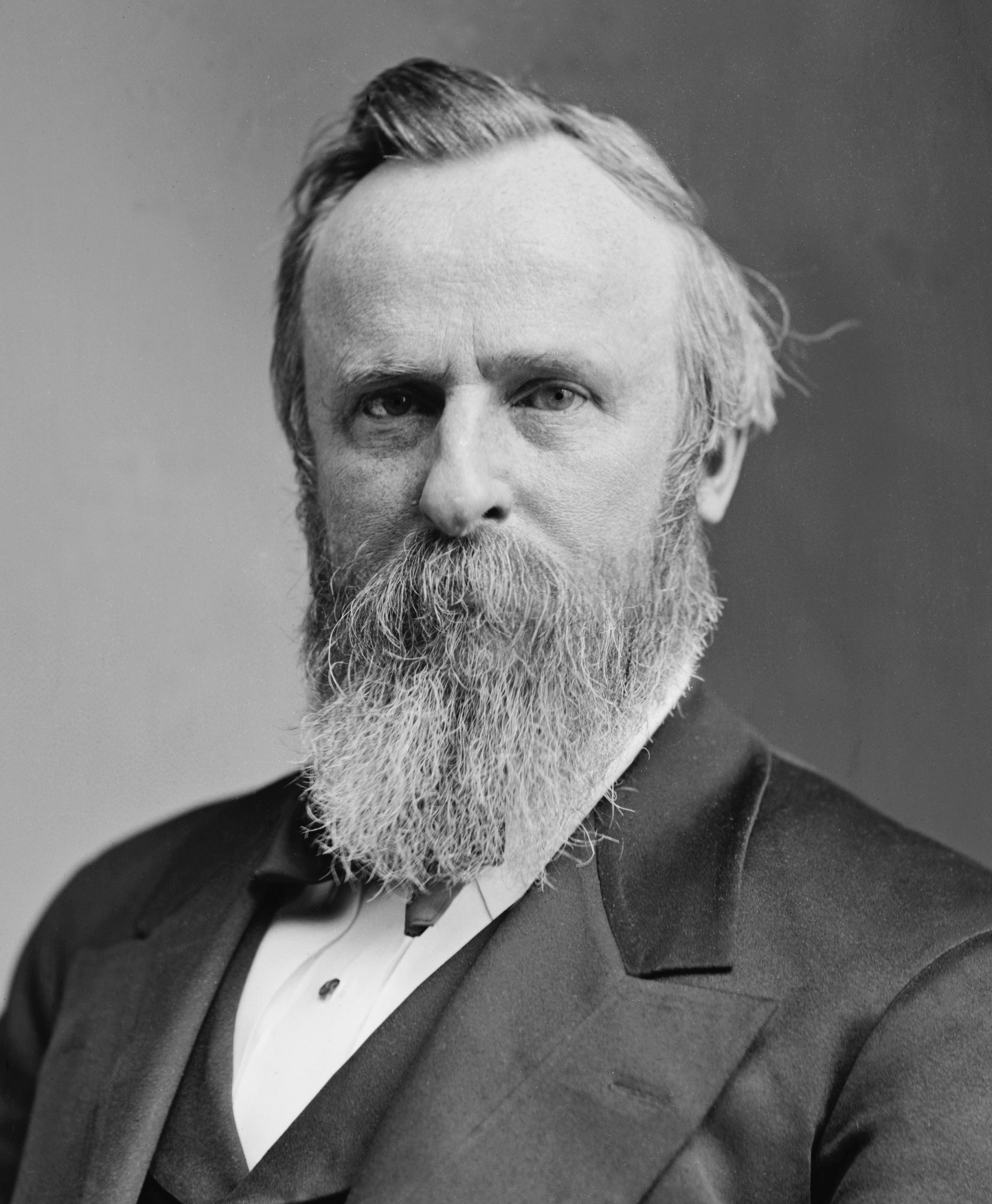
Nominee	Samuel J. Tilden	Rutherford B. Hayes
Party	Democratic	Republican
Home state	New York	Ohio
Running mate	Thomas A. Hendricks	William A. Wheeler
Electoral vote	15	0
Popular vote	213,526	208,011
Percentage	49.65%	48.13%
County results
Tilden
40–50%
50–60%
60–70%
70–80%
Hayes
40–50%
50–60%
60–70%
President before election
Ulysses S. Grant
Republican
Elected President
Rutherford B. Hayes
Republican

A presidential election was held in Indiana on November 7, 1876, as part of the 1876 United States presidential election. The Democratic ticket of the governor of New York Samuel J. Tilden and the governor of Indiana Thomas A. Hendricks defeated the Republican ticket of the governor of Ohio Rutherford B. Hayes and the U.S. representative from New York's 19th congressional district William A. Wheeler. Hayes defeated Tilden in the national election with 185 electoral votes.

== General election ==
=== Statistics ===
This was the first time the Democratic presidential ticket carried Indiana since 1856. As of 2024, this is the only presidential election in which the Republican nominee won without carrying Indiana. This was the second and most recent election (along with 1848) when the state voted for a losing Democrat.

=== Summary ===
Indiana chose 15 electors in a statewide general election. Nineteenth-century presidential elections used a form of block voting that allowed voters to modify the electoral list nominated by a political party before submitting their ballots. Because voters elected each member of the Electoral College individually, electors nominated by the same party often received differing numbers of votes as a consequence of voter rolloff, split-ticket voting, or electoral fusion. This table reflects the statewide popular vote as calculated by Walter Dean Burnham in his influential study, Presidential Ballots, 1836–1892. Svend Petersen finds ten more votes for Tilden and 1,140 more for Hayes.

1876 United States presidential election in Indiana
Party	Candidate	Votes	%	±%
Democratic	Samuel J. Tilden Thomas A. Hendricks	213,516	49.65	▲3.06
Republican	Rutherford B. Hayes William A. Wheeler	206,971	48.13	▼4.87
Greenback	Peter Cooper Samuel Fenton Cary	9,533	2.22	▲2.22
Total votes		430,020	100.00	

== See also ==
- United States presidential elections in Indiana

== Bibliography ==
- Burnham, Walter Dean (1955). Presidential Ballots, 1836–1892. Baltimore: Johns Hopkins Press.
- Madison, James H. (1986). The Indiana Way: A State History. Bloomington: Indiana University Press.
- Petersen, Svend (1963). A Statistical History of the American Presidential Elections. New York: Frederick Ungar Publishing Company. LCCN 62-21786.
