= 1884 United States presidential election in Indiana =

- November 4, 1884
- Turnout: 92.2% ▼2.2 pp

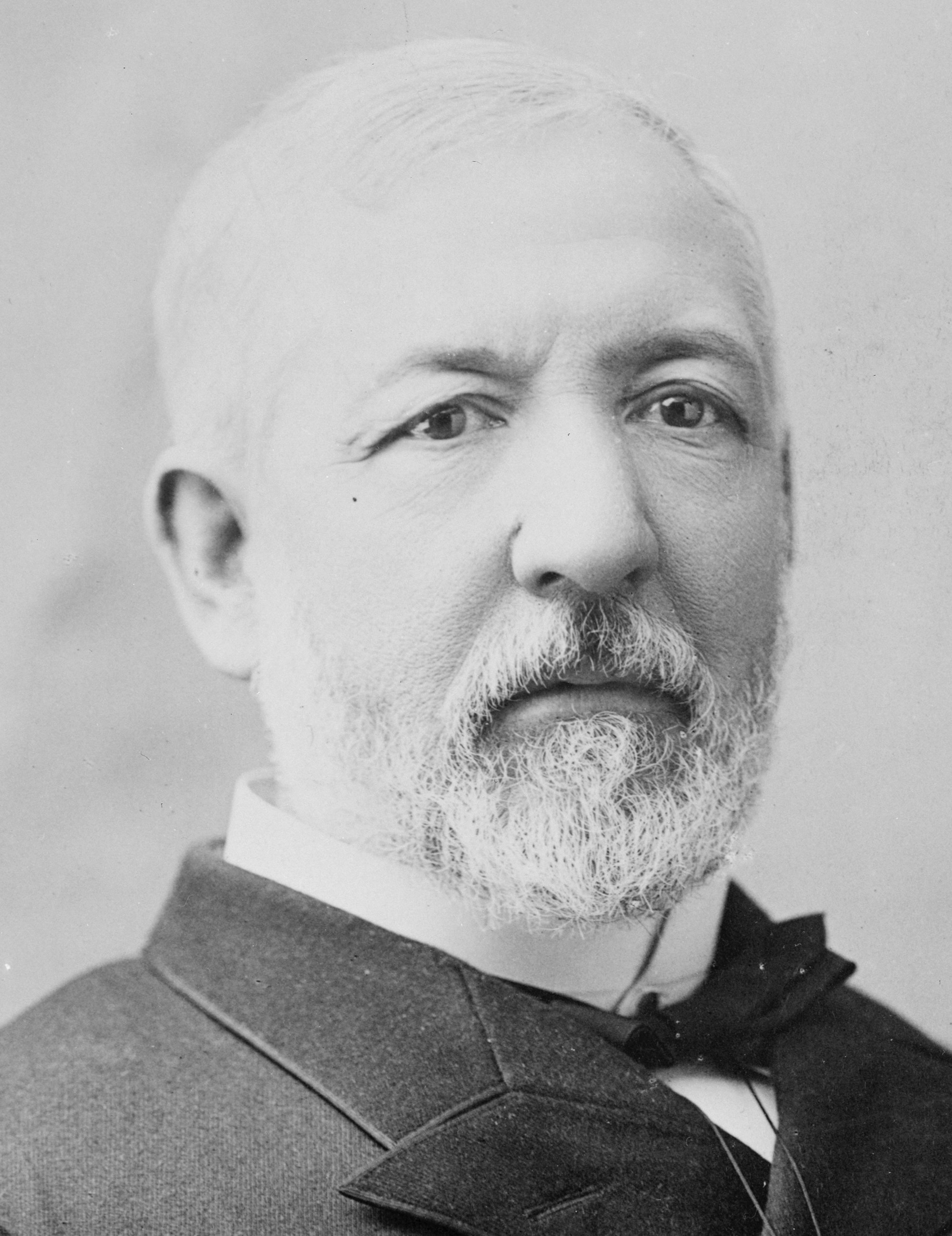
Nominee	Grover Cleveland	James G. Blaine
Party	Democratic	Republican
Home state	New York	Maine
Running mate	Thomas A. Hendricks	John A. Logan
Electoral vote	15	0
Popular vote	245,041	238,511
Percentage	49.46%	48.14%
County results
Cleveland
40–50%
50–60%
60–70%
70–80%
Blaine
40–50%
50–60%
60–70%
President before election
Chester A. Arthur
Republican
Elected President
Grover Cleveland
Democratic

A presidential election was held in Indiana on November 4, 1884, as part of the 1884 United States presidential election. The Democratic ticket of the governor of New York Grover Cleveland and the former governor of Indiana Thomas A. Hendricks defeated the Republican ticket of the former U.S. secretary of state James G. Blaine and the senior U.S. senator from Illinois John A. Logan. Cleveland defeated Blaine in the national election with 219 electoral votes.

== General election ==
=== Summary ===
Indiana chose 15 electors in a statewide general election. Nineteenth-century presidential elections used a form of block voting that allowed voters to modify the electoral list nominated by a political party before submitting their ballots. Because voters elected each member of the Electoral College individually, electors nominated by the same party often received differing numbers of votes as a consequence of voter rolloff, split-ticket voting, or electoral fusion. This table reflects the statewide popular vote as calculated by Walter Dean Burnham in his influential study, Presidential Ballots, 1836–1892. Svend Petersen's later Statistical History of the American Presidential Elections shows slightly smaller totals for all four candidates: 49 fewer votes for Cleveland, 31 fewer for Blaine, 104 fewer for Butler, and 33 fewer for St. John.

1884 United States presidential election in Indiana
Party	Candidate	Votes	%	±%
Democratic	Grover Cleveland Thomas A. Hendricks	245,041	49.46	▲1.55
Republican	James G. Blaine John A. Logan	238,511	48.14	▼1.18
Greenback	Benjamin Butler Absolom M. West	8,820	1.78	▼1.00
Prohibition	John St. John William Daniel	3,051	0.62	▲0.62
Total votes		495,423	100.00	

=== Results ===
1884 United States presidential election in Indiana
Party	Electors for Candidate	Votes
Democratic	Mortimer Nye	245,005
Democratic	William F. Townsend	245,004
Democratic	James A. New	245,001
Democratic	Nimrod R. Elliott	244,999
Democratic	Frank E. Gavin	244,997
Democratic	William H. Harkins	244,996
Democratic	Willis Hickam	244,996
Democratic	Henry S. Cauthorn	244,995
Democratic	William R. Oglebay	244,995
Democratic	James M. Seller	244,995
Democratic	Johannes Kopoelke	244,994
Democratic	Aaron A. Cravens	244,943
Democratic	William H. Dills	244,992
Democratic	Bayless W. Hanna	245,990
Democratic	William D. H. Hunter	245,983
Republican	Joseph D. Ferrall	238,489
Republican	James M. Reynolds	238,489
Republican	Marshall Hacker	238,488
Republican	John Berkshire	238,486
Republican	James F. Elliott	238,486
Republican	William B. Roberts	238,486
Republican	James C. Veatch	238,485
Republican	Elias S. Holliday	238,484
Republican	William D. Ward	238,484
Republican	Truman F. Palmer	238,482
Republican	Thaddeus S. Rollins	238,478
Republican	Josiah E. Mellett	238,472
Republican	John M. Butler	238,471
Republican	Milo Smith Hascall	238,463
Republican	Lemuel W. Royse	238,469
Greenback	Richard S. Rogers	8,812
Greenback	Millard F. Ireland	8,810
Greenback	Robert S. Cook	8,807
Greenback	Rufus H. Davis	8,807
Greenback	Edmund T. Spottswood	8,807
Greenback	Alanson T. Bliss	8,806
Greenback	Henry Doup	8,806
Greenback	James G. Nisbet	8,805
Greenback	John Studebaker	8,805
Greenback	Joseph Butler	8,804
Greenback	John S. Bender	8,794
Greenback	Joseph Q. A. Newsom	8,780
Greenback	William W. Fenton	8,779
Greenback	Reuben A. Riley	8,293
Greenback	Joshua K. Speer	8,028
Prohibition	Preston Rider	3,028
Prohibition	Isaac Keen	3,020
Prohibition	Thomas Painter	3,020
Prohibition	Jesse F. Wilson	3,020
Prohibition	Newton Burwell	3,019
Prohibition	William McKinney Gard	3,019
Prohibition	Charles P. Gwin	3,019
Prohibition	John A. Pollock	3,019
Prohibition	William F. Singleton	3,019
Prohibition	Thomas H. C. Beal	3,018
Prohibition	John Birdsell	3,018
Prohibition	Frank E. Dishman	3,018
Prohibition	Samuel J. Wilson	3,018
Prohibition	Thomas H. Stewart	3,016
Prohibition	Elijah Coate	3,007
Total		≈495,423

== See also ==
- United States presidential elections in Indiana

== Bibliography ==
- Burnham, Walter Dean (1955). Presidential Ballots, 1836–1892. Baltimore: Johns Hopkins Press.
- Indiana (1887). Annual Reports of the Officers of State [...]. Indianapolis.
- Madison, James H. (1986). The Indiana Way: A State History. Bloomington: Indiana University Press.
- Petersen, Svend (1963). A Statistical History of the American Presidential Elections. New York: Frederick Ungar Publishing Company. LCCN 62-21786.
