= 1872 United States presidential election in Indiana =

- November 5, 1872
- Turnout: 85.3% ▼7.2 pp
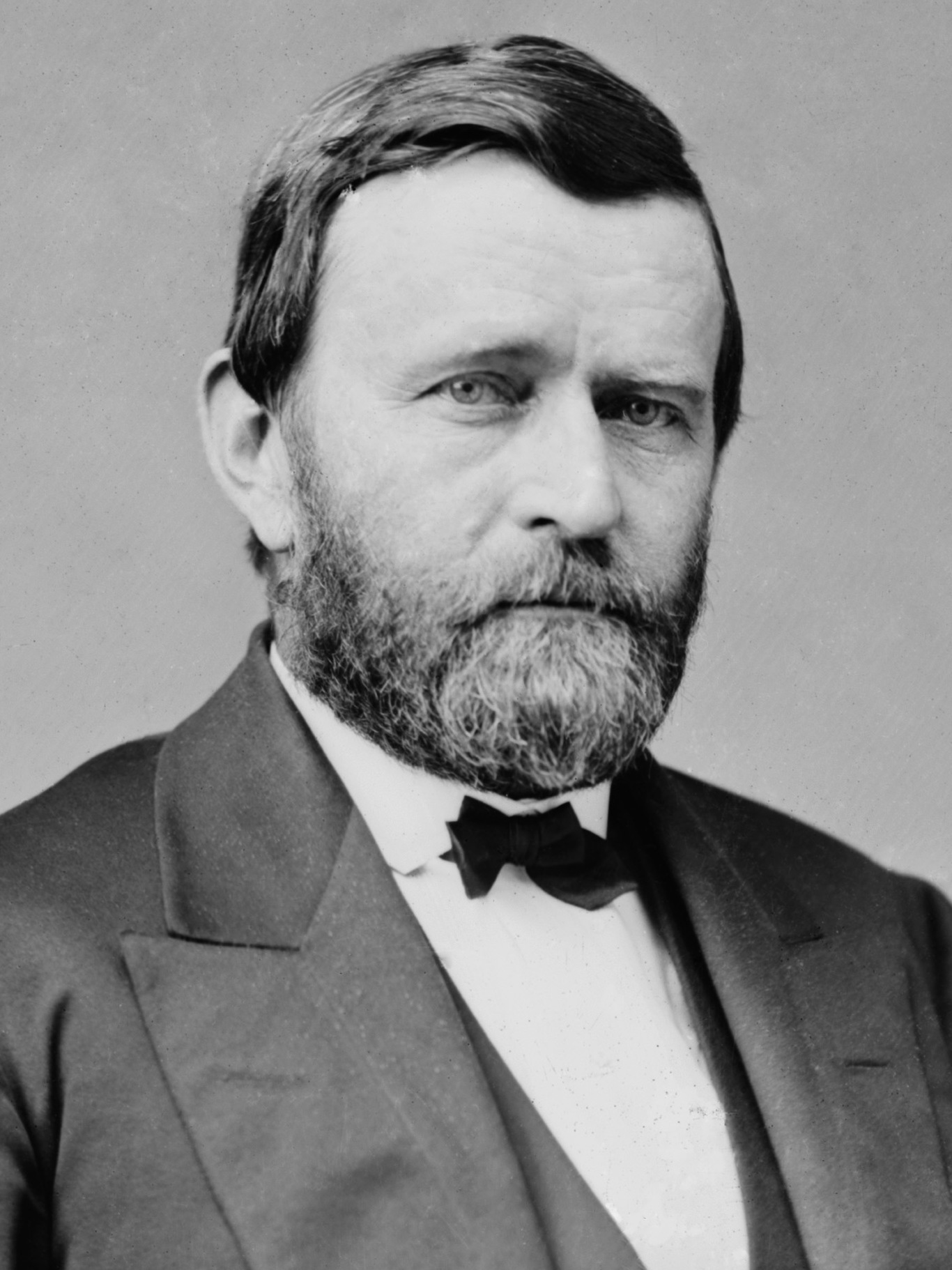

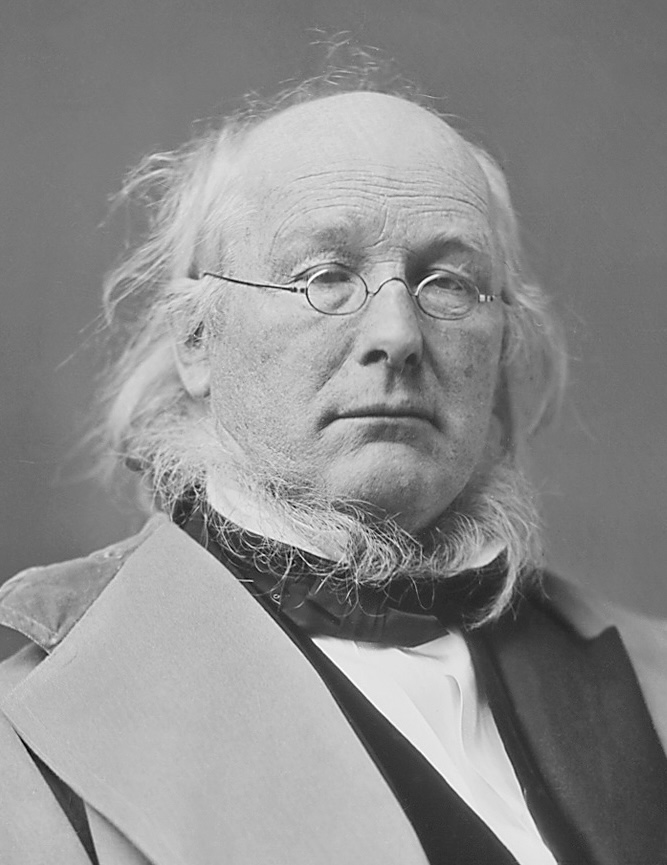
Nominee	Ulysses S. Grant	Horace Greeley
Party	Republican	Liberal Republican
Alliance		Democratic
Home state	Illinois	New York
Running mate	Henry Wilson	B. Gratz Brown
Electoral vote	15	0
Popular vote	186,147	163,632
Percentage	53.00%	46.59%
County results
Grant
50–60%
60–70%
70–80%
Greeley
50–60%
60–70%
70–80%
President before election
Ulysses S. Grant
Republican
Elected President
Ulysses S. Grant
Republican

A presidential election was held in Indiana on November 5, 1872, as part of the 1872 United States presidential election. The Republican ticket of the incumbent president Ulysses S. Grant and the junior U.S. senator from Massachusetts Henry Wilson defeated the Liberal Republican and Democratic ticket of the editor of the New-York Tribune and former U.S. representative from New York's 6th congressional district Horace Greeley and the governor of Missouri B. Gratz Brown. Grant defeated Greeley in the national election with 286 electoral votes.

== General election ==
=== Summary ===
Indiana chose 15 electors in a statewide general election. Nineteenth-century presidential elections used a form of block voting that allowed voters to modify the electoral list nominated by a political party before submitting their ballots. Because voters elected each member of the Electoral College individually, electors nominated by the same party often received differing numbers of votes as a consequence of voter rolloff, split-ticket voting, or electoral fusion. This table reflects the statewide popular vote as calculated by Walter Dean Burnham in his influential study, Presidential Ballots, 1836–1892, including 1,417 votes for Charles O'Conor listed in the appendix which cannot be tabulated by county. Svend Petersen's later study includes these votes while reporting similar totals to Burnham for Grant and Greeley.

1872 United States presidential election in Indiana
Party	Candidate	Votes	%	±%
Republican	Ulysses S. Grant Henry Wilson	186,147	53.00	▲1.61
Liberal Republican	Horace Greeley B. Gratz Brown	163,623	46.59	▼2.02
Straight-Out Democratic	Charles O'Conor John Quincy Adams II	1,417	0.40	▲0.40
Total votes		351,187	100.00	

== See also ==
- United States presidential elections in Indiana

== Bibliography ==
- Burnham, Walter Dean (1955). Presidential Ballots, 1836–1892. Baltimore: Johns Hopkins Press.
- Madison, James H. (1986). The Indiana Way: A State History. Bloomington: Indiana University Press.
- Petersen, Svend (1963). A Statistical History of the American Presidential Elections. New York: Frederick Ungar Publishing Company. LCCN 62-21786.
