= 1880 United States presidential election in Indiana =

- November 2, 1880
- Turnout: 94.4% ▼0.2 pp
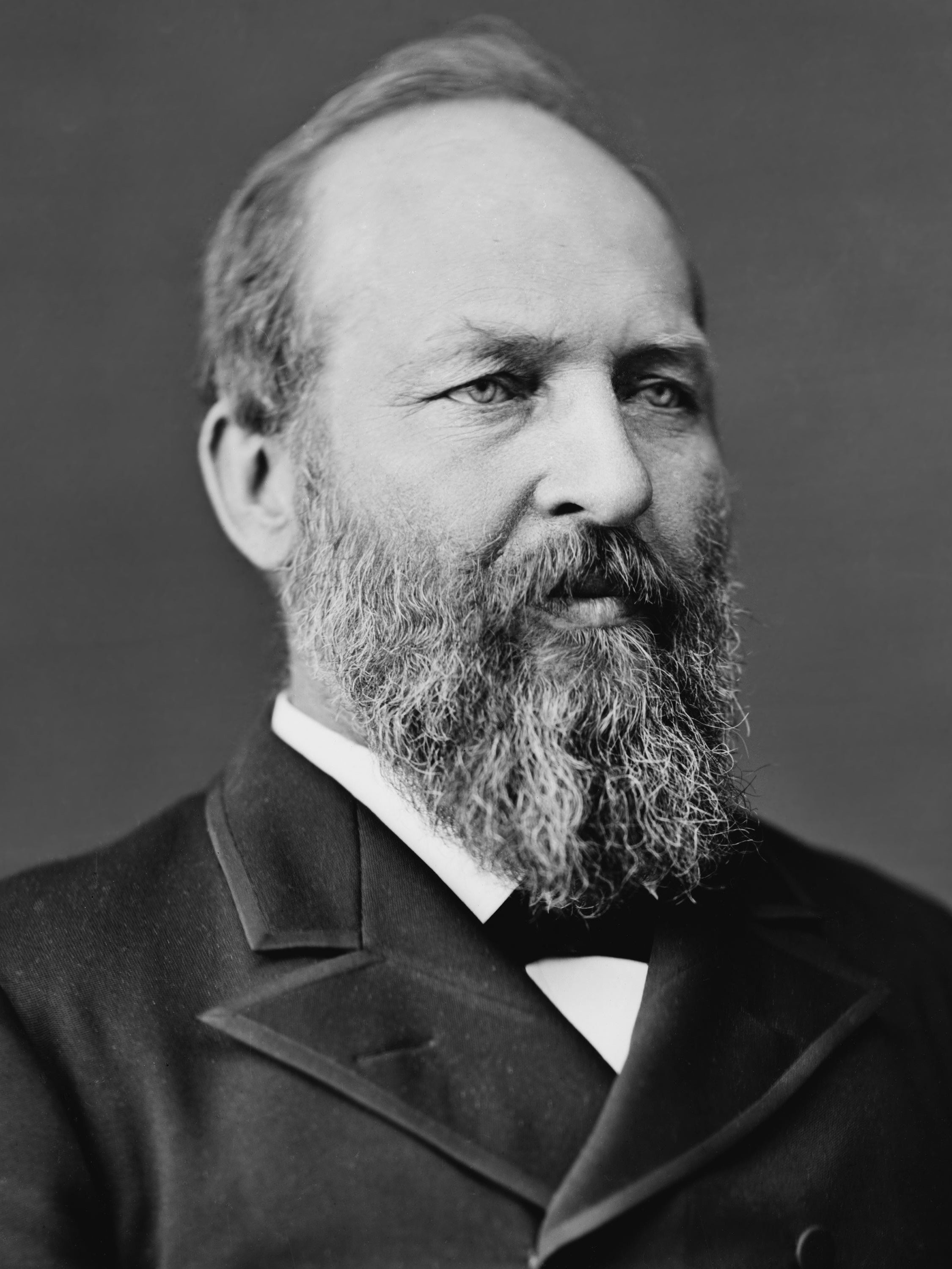

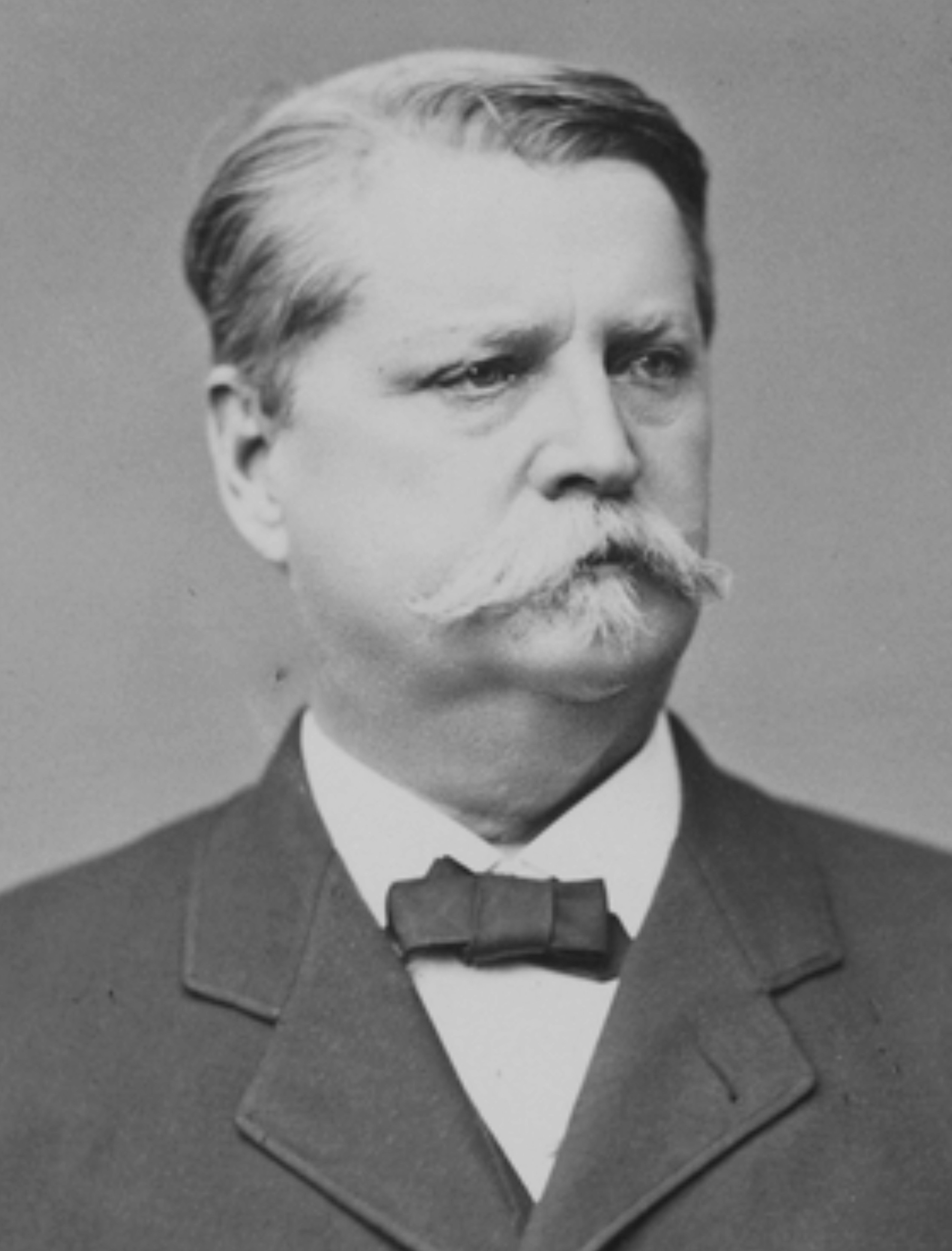
Nominee	James A. Garfield	Winfield Scott Hancock
Party	Republican	Democratic
Home state	Ohio	Pennsylvania
Running mate	Chester A. Arthur	William Hayden English
Electoral vote	15	0
Popular vote	232,164	225,522
Percentage	49.32%	47.91%
County results
Garfield
40–50%
50–60%
60–70%
Hancock
40–50%
50–60%
60–70%
70–80%
Tie
<50%
President before election
Rutherford B. Hayes
Republican
Elected President
James A. Garfield
Republican

A presidential election was held in Indiana on November 2, 1880, as part of the 1880 United States presidential election. The Republican ticket of the U.S. representative from Ohio's 19th congressional district James A. Garfield and the chair of the New York Republican Party Chester A. Arthur defeated the Democratic ticket of the major general Winfield S. Hancock and the former U.S. representative from Indiana's 2nd congressional district William H. English. Garfield defeated Hancock in the national election with 214 electoral votes.

== General election ==
=== Summary ===
Indiana chose 15 electors in a statewide general election. Nineteenth-century presidential elections used a form of block voting that allowed voters to modify the electoral list nominated by a political party before submitting their ballots. Because voters elected each member of the Electoral College individually, electors nominated by the same party often received differing numbers of votes as a consequence of voter rolloff, split-ticket voting, or electoral fusion. This table reflects the statewide popular vote as calculated by Walter Dean Burnham in his influential study, Presidential Ballots, 1836–1892. Svend Petersen finds six more votes for Garfield, one fewer for Hancock, and 80 fewer for Weaver in Indiana.

1880 United States presidential election in Indiana
Party	Candidate	Votes	%	±%
Republican	James A. Garfield Chester A. Arthur	232,158	49.32	▲1.19
Democratic	Winfield Scott Hancock William Hayden English	225,523	47.91	▼1.74
Greenback	James B. Weaver Barzillai J. Chambers	13,066	2.78	▲0.56
Total votes		470,747	100.00	

== See also ==
- United States presidential elections in Indiana

== Bibliography ==
- Burnham, Walter Dean (1955). Presidential Ballots, 1836–1892. Baltimore: Johns Hopkins Press.
- Madison, James H. (1986). The Indiana Way: A State History. Bloomington: Indiana University Press.
- Petersen, Svend (1963). A Statistical History of the American Presidential Elections. New York: Frederick Ungar Publishing Company. LCCN 62-21786.
