= 1868 United States presidential election in Indiana =

- November 3, 1868
- Turnout: 92.5% ▲9.6 pp
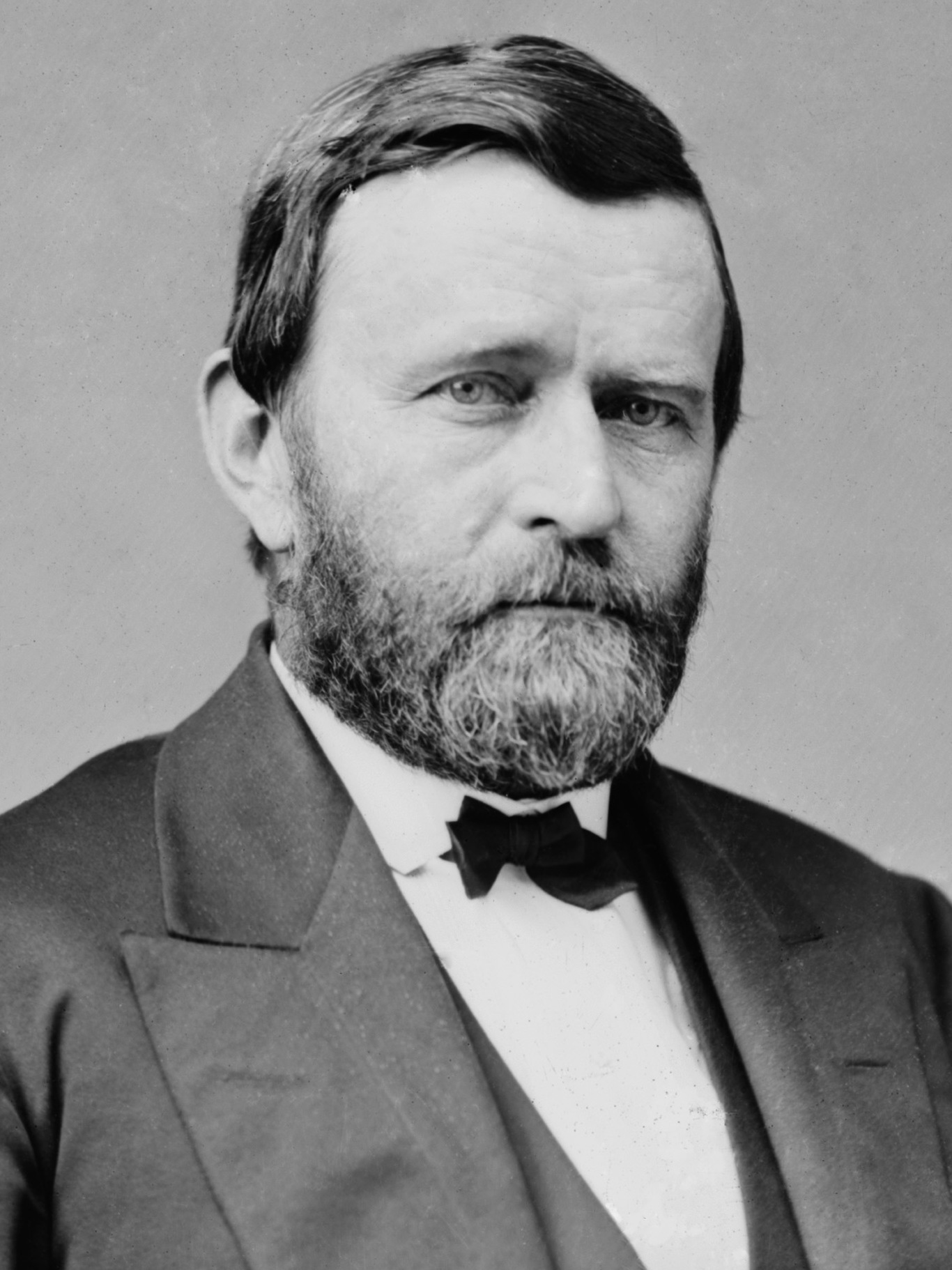

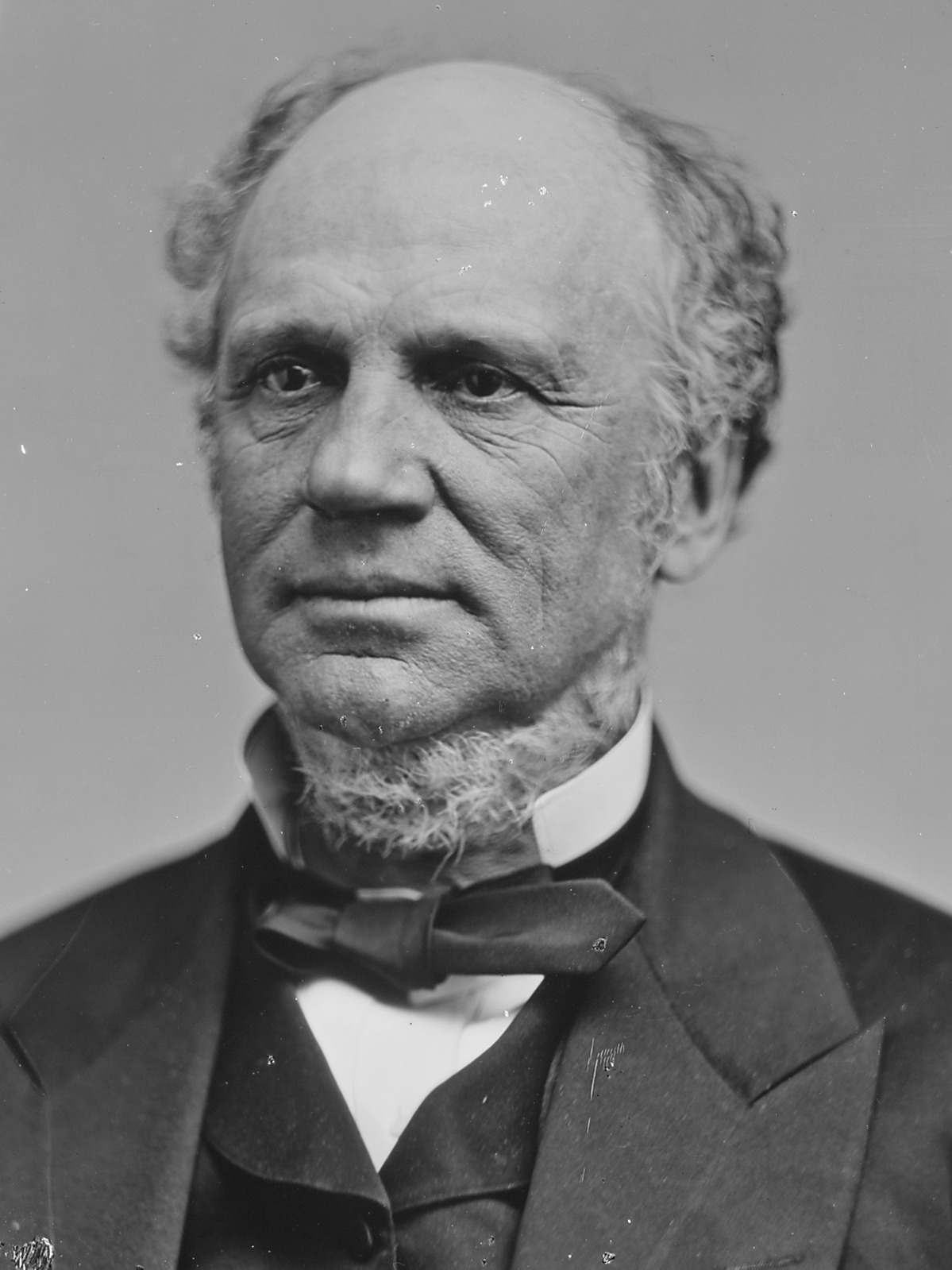
| Nominee | Ulysses S. Grant | Horatio Seymour |
| Party | Republican | Democratic |
| Home state | Illinois | New York |
| Running mate | Schuyler Colfax | Francis Preston Blair Jr. |
| Electoral vote | 13 | 0 |
| Popular vote | 176,552 | 166,980 |
| Percentage | 51.39% | 48.61% |
County results
Grant
50–60%
60–70%
70–80%
Seymour
50–60%
60–70%
70–80%
President before election
Andrew Johnson
Democratic
Elected President
Ulysses S. Grant
Republican

A presidential election was held in Indiana on November 3, 1868, as part of the 1868 United States presidential election. The Republican ticket of the commanding general of the United States Army Ulysses S. Grant and the speaker of the United States House of Representatives Schuyler Colfax defeated the Democratic ticket of the former governor of New York Horatio Seymour and the former U.S. representative from Missouri's 1st congressional district Francis P. Blair Jr.. Grant defeated Seymour in the national election with 214 electoral votes.

== General election ==
=== Summary ===
Indiana chose 13 electors in a statewide general election. Nineteenth-century presidential elections used a form of block voting that allowed voters to modify the electoral list nominated by a political party before submitting their ballots. Because voters elected each member of the Electoral College individually, electors nominated by the same party often received differing numbers of votes as a consequence of voter rolloff, split-ticket voting, or electoral fusion. This table reflects the statewide popular vote as calculated by Walter Dean Burnham in his influential study, Presidential Ballots, 1836–1892.

1868 United States presidential election in Indiana
| Party | Candidate | Votes | % | ±% |
|---|---|---|---|---|
| Republican | Ulysses S. Grant Schuyler Colfax | 176,552 | 51.39 | ▼2.13 |
| Democratic | Horatio Seymour Francis Preston Blair Jr. | 166,980 | 48.61 | ▲2.13 |
| Total votes | | 343,532 | 100.00 | |

== See also ==
- United States presidential elections in Indiana

== Bibliography ==
- "1868 Electoral College Results". National Archives.
- Burnham, Walter Dean (1955). Presidential Ballots, 1836–1892. Baltimore: Johns Hopkins Press.
- Dubin, Michael J. (2002). United States Presidential Elections, 1788-1860. Jefferson, NC: McFarland & Co. ISBN 978-0-7864-6422-7.
- Madison, James H. (1986). The Indiana Way: A State History. Bloomington: Indiana University Press.
