= 1864 United States presidential election in Indiana =

- November 8, 1864
- Turnout: 82.9% ▼6.5 pp

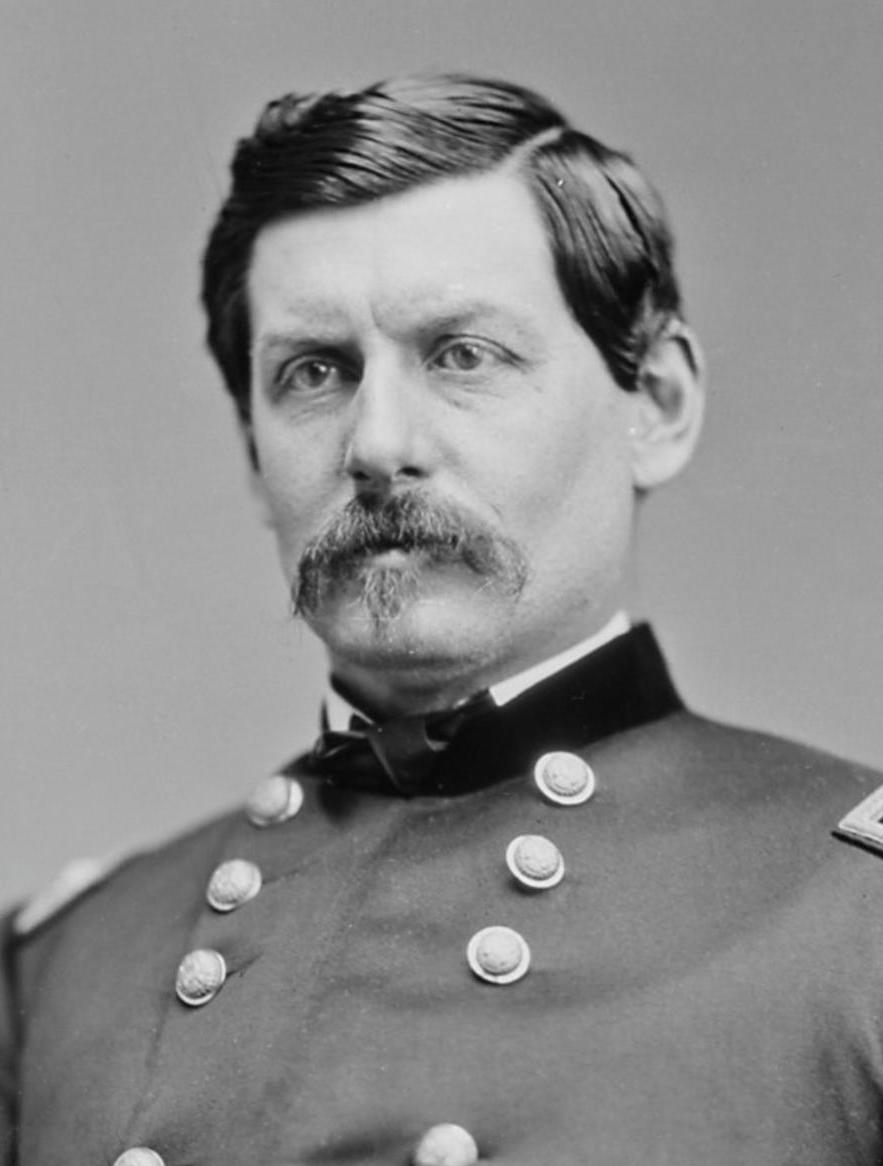
Nominee	Abraham Lincoln	George B. McClellan
Party	National Union	Democratic
Home state	Illinois	New Jersey
Running mate	Andrew Johnson	George H. Pendleton
Electoral vote	13	0
Popular vote	149,922	130,223
Percentage	53.52%	46.48%
County results
Lincoln
50–60%
60–70%
70–80%
80–90%
McClellan
50–60%
60–70%
70–80%
80–90%
President before election
Abraham Lincoln
Republican
Elected President
Abraham Lincoln
National Union

A presidential election was held in Indiana on November 8, 1864, as part of the 1864 United States presidential election. The National Union ticket of the incumbent president Abraham Lincoln and the governor of Tennessee Andrew Johnson defeated the Democratic ticket of the former commanding general of the United States Army George B. McClellan and the U.S. representative from Ohio's 1st congressional district George H. Pendleton. Lincoln defeated McClellan in the national election with 212 electoral votes.

== General election ==
=== Summary ===
Indiana chose 13 electors in a statewide general election. Nineteenth-century presidential elections used a form of block voting that allowed voters to modify the electoral list nominated by a political party before submitting their ballots. Because voters elected each member of the Electoral College individually, electors nominated by the same party often received differing numbers of votes as a consequence of voter rolloff, split-ticket voting, or electoral fusion. This table reflects the statewide popular vote as calculated by Walter Dean Burnham in his influential study, Presidential Ballots, 1836–1892.

1864 United States presidential election in Indiana
Party	Candidate	Votes	%	±%
National Union	Abraham Lincoln Andrew Johnson	149,922	53.52	▲2.38
Democratic	George B. McClellan George H. Pendleton	130,223	46.48	▲4.11
Total votes		280,145	100.00	

== See also ==
- United States presidential elections in Indiana

== Bibliography ==
- "1864 Electoral College Results". National Archives.
- Burnham, Walter Dean (1955). Presidential Ballots, 1836–1892. Baltimore: Johns Hopkins Press.
- Dubin, Michael J. (2002). United States Presidential Elections, 1788-1860. Jefferson, NC: McFarland & Co. ISBN 978-0-7864-6422-7.
- Madison, James H. (1986). The Indiana Way: A State History. Bloomington: Indiana University Press.
