= The Presidential Vote, 1896–1932 =

American political non-fiction book

- Author: Edgar E. Robinson
- Language: English
- Publisher: Stanford University Press
- Publication date: 1934
- Publication place: United States
- Media type: Print
- Pages: 403
- OCLC: 484101074
- LC Class: JK524 .R6 Suppl.

The Presidential Vote, 1896–1932 is a 1934 book by Stanford University professor Edgar E. Robinson containing detailed results of United States presidential elections from the years 1896 to 1932. The book was published by Stanford University Press.

== Contents ==
The Presidential Vote, 1896–1932 contains a table of county results of every presidential election from 1896 to 1932, collected from various official sources. The table spans around 240 pages. The book contains additional tables providing analyses of the results, and maps showing which party each county voted for in each covered election. The statistics are also accompanied by prose providing further analysis of the results.

== Reception ==
In the American Political Science Review, Robert C. Brooks praised the book as "colossal" and "technically perfect", writing that it will be a useful tool for historians and political scientists. He compared the book to Statistik der Nationalratswahlen, 1919–1928, a similar book covering elections to the National Council in Switzerland. Brooks noted the inclusion of interesting details, such as the fact that out of the United States' 3096 counties, relatively few voted for the same party during every election from 1896 to 1932 (619 for the Democratic Party and 83 for the Republican Party).

In The American Historical Review, Homer C. Hockett wrote that the book "will supply scholars with fundamental matter for many studies of local and sectional politics such as have become popular in recent decades", and that while it would be more useful to also have similar information on state and local elections, such a compilation would require a significant amount of work. Hockett noted that the book itself was a significant effort, and the first document to contain all such results together.

== Legacy ==
Presidential Ballots, 1836–1892, published in 1955 and written by Dean Burnham, built on Robinson's work by compiling results for even older elections.
