= 1840 United States presidential election in Indiana =

- November 2, 1840
- Turnout: 84.4% ▲15.2 pp
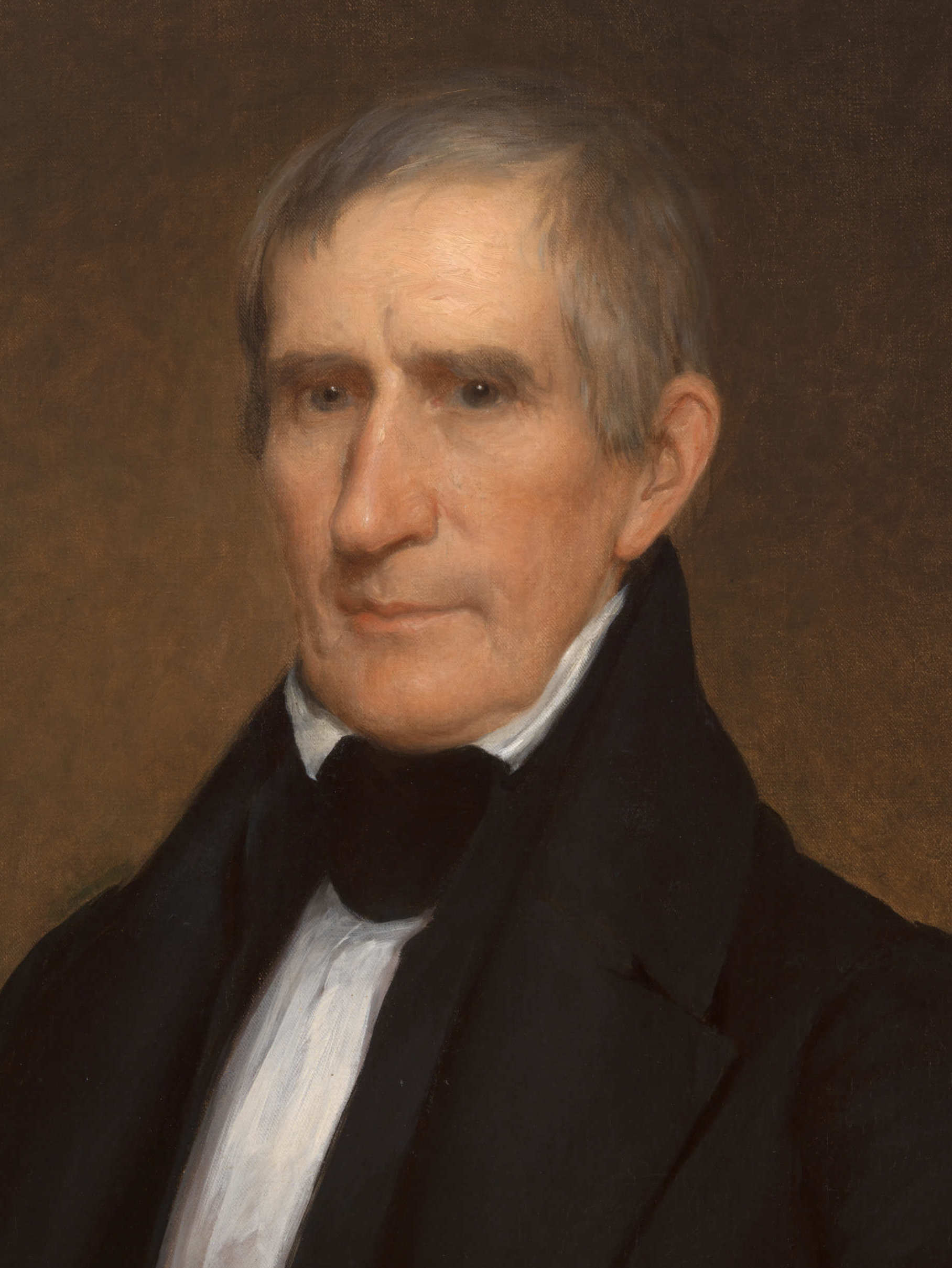

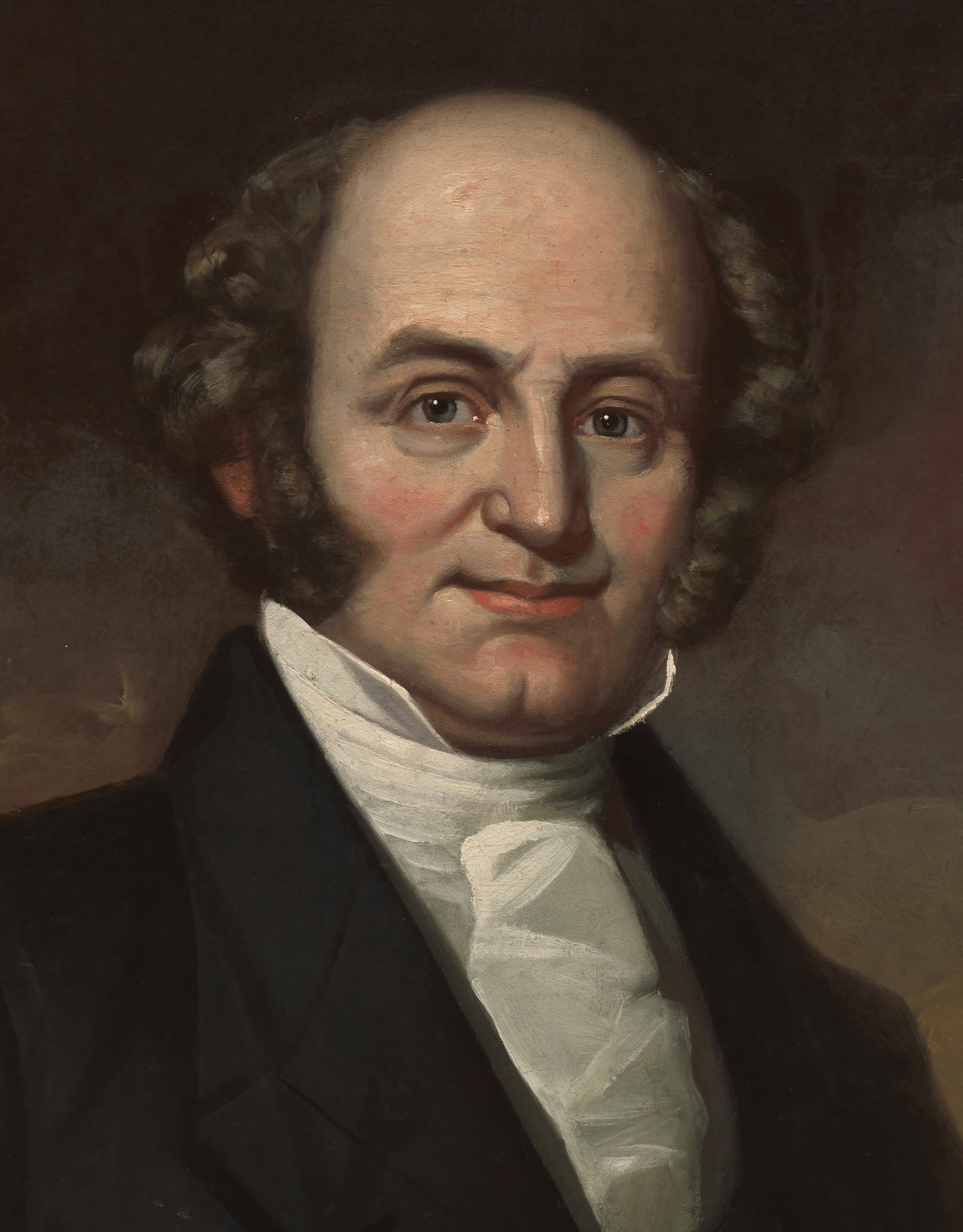
Nominee	William Henry Harrison	Martin Van Buren
Party	Whig	Democratic
Home state	Ohio	New York
Running mate	John Tyler	N/A (Note: No candidate was formally nominated.)
Electoral vote	9	0
Popular vote	65,237	51,691
Percentage	55.01%	44.96%
County results
Harrison
50–60%
60–70%
70–80%
Van Buren
50–60%
60–70%
70–80%
80–90%
Unknown/No vote
President before election
Martin Van Buren
Democratic
Elected President
William Henry Harrison
Whig

A presidential election was held in Indiana on November 2, 1840, as part of the 1840 United States presidential election. The Whig ticket of the former major general William Henry Harrison and the former U.S. senator from Virginia John Tyler defeated the incumbent Democratic president Martin Van Buren. Harrison defeated Van Buren in the national election with 234 electoral votes.

== General election ==
=== Summary ===
Indiana chose nine electors in a statewide general election. Nineteenth-century presidential elections used a form of block voting that allowed voters to modify the electoral list nominated by a political party before submitting their ballots. Because voters elected each member of the Electoral College individually, electors nominated by the same party often received differing numbers of votes as a consequence of voter rolloff, split-ticket voting, or electoral fusion. This table compares the votes for the most popular elector pledged to each ticket, to give an approximate sense of the statewide result.

1840 United States presidential election in Indiana
Party	Candidate	Votes	%	±%
Whig	William Henry Harrison John Tyler	63,237	55.01	▼0.58
Democratic	Martin Van Buren N/A	51,691	44.96	▲0.55
Liberty	James G. Birney Thomas Earle	30	0.03	▲0.03
Total votes		114,958	100.00	

=== Results ===
1840 United States presidential election in Indiana
Party	Candidate	Votes
Whig	James H. Cravens	63,237
Whig	John W. Payne	63,237
Whig	Caleb B. Smith	63,237
Whig	Richard W. Thompson	63,235
Whig	Joseph L. White	63,235
Whig	William Herod	63,227
Whig	Joseph G. Marshall	63,225
Whig	Samuel C. Sample	63,217
Whig	McCarty Jonathan	63,216
Democratic	William Hendricks	51,691
Democratic	Robert Dale Owen	51,690
Democratic	Thomas J. Henley	51,688
Democratic	Andrew Kennedy	51,688
Democratic	John L. Robinson	51,687
Democratic	William J. Peaslet	51,676
Democratic	John M. Lenon	51,642
Democratic	Henry Secrest	51,494
Democratic	Tilghman Howard	51,339
Democratic	George W. Ewing (withdrawn)	351
Democratic	George Boon (withdrawn)	196
Unpledged	J. M. Simmons	51
Liberty	Lesmon Basye	30
Liberty	James Clayton	30
Liberty	Cyrus Hamilton	30
Liberty	Thomas Hicklin	30
Liberty	Thomas Johns	30
Liberty	Thomas Maxwell	30
Liberty	William Smith	30
Liberty	Samuel Stephenson	30
Liberty	Daniel Worth	30
Total		≈114,958

== See also ==
- United States presidential elections in Indiana

== Bibliography ==
- "1840 Electoral College Results". National Archives.
- Dubin, Michael J. (2002). United States Presidential Elections, 1788–1860: The Official Results by County and State. Jefferson, NC: McFarland & Co. p. xvi.
- Lampi, Philip J. (n.d.). "Electoral College". A New Nation Votes. American Antiquarian Society.
- Madison, James H. (1986). The Indiana Way: A State History. Bloomington: Indiana University Press.
- Ratcliffe, Donald J. (Spring 2014). "Popular Preferences in the Presidential Election of 1824". Journal of the Early Republic. 34 (1): 45–77. JSTOR 24486931.
- Riker, Dorothy; Thornbrough, Gayle, eds. (1960). Indiana Election Returns, 1816–1851. Indianapolis: Indiana Historical Bureau.
