= 1828 United States presidential election in Indiana =

- November 3, 1828
- Turnout: 68.7% ▲31.6 pp

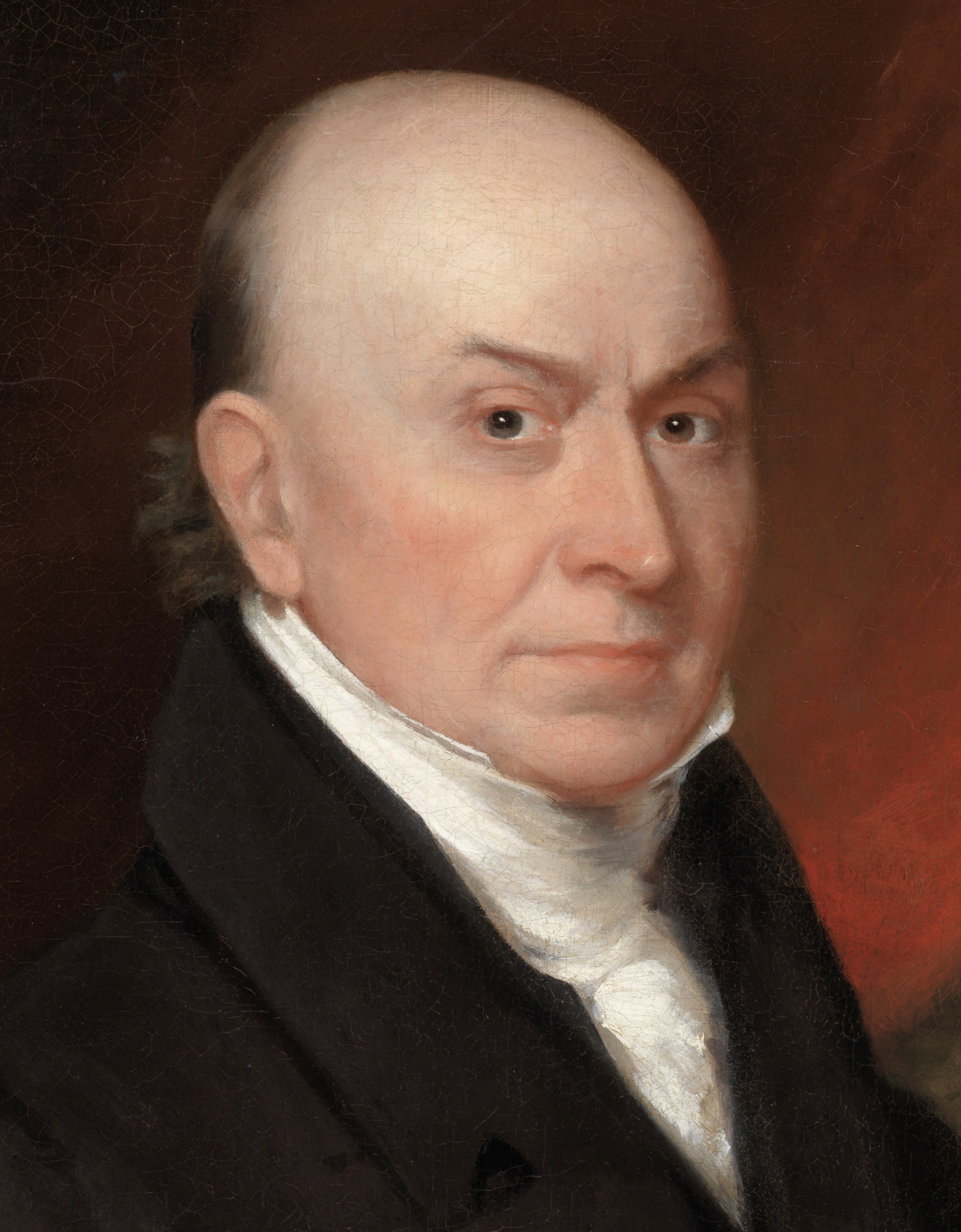
Nominee	Andrew Jackson	John Quincy Adams
Party	Democratic	National Republican
Home state	Tennessee	Massachusetts
Running mate	John C. Calhoun	Richard Rush
Electoral vote	5	0
Popular vote	22,140	16,978
Percentage	56.60%	43.40%
County results
Jackson
50–60%
60–70%
70–80%
80–90%
Adams
50–60%
60–70%
70–80%
Unknown/No vote
President before election
John Quincy Adams
National Republican
Elected President
Andrew Jackson
Democratic

A presidential election was held in Indiana on November 3, 1828, as part of the 1828 United States presidential election. The Democratic ticket of the former U.S. senator from Tennessee Andrew Jackson and the incumbent vice president John C. Calhoun defeated National Republican ticket of the incumbent president John Quincy Adams and the U.S. secretary of the treasury Richard Rush. Jackson defeated Adams in the national election with 178 electoral votes.

== General election ==
=== Summary ===
Indiana chose five electors in a statewide general election. Nineteenth-century presidential elections used a form of block voting that allowed voters to modify the electoral list nominated by a political party before submitting their ballots. Because voters elected each member of the Electoral College individually, electors nominated by the same party often received differing numbers of votes as a consequence of voter rolloff, split-ticket voting, or electoral fusion. This table compares the votes for the most popular elector pledged to each ticket, to give an approximate sense of the statewide result.

1828 United States presidential election in Indiana
Party	Candidate	Votes	%	±%
Democratic	Andrew Jackson John C. Calhoun	22,140	56.60	▲9.66
National Republican	John Quincy Adams Richard Rush	16,978	43.40	▲23.90
Total votes		39,118	100.00	

=== Results ===
1828 United States presidential election in Indiana
Party	Candidate	Votes
Democratic	Benjamin V. Beckes	22,140
Democratic	Ratliff Boon	22,122
Democratic	Jesse B. Durham	22,114
Democratic	Ross Smiley	22,099
Democratic	William Lowe	22,033
National Republican	Isaac Montgomery	16,978
National Republican	Joseph Bartholomew	16,973
National Republican	Amaziah Morgan	16,956
National Republican	Joseph Orr	16,934
National Republican	John Watts	16,915
Independent Democrat	Jacob Lowe	63
Independent Democrat	David Robb	35
Independent National Republican	Joseph Watts	16
Independent Democrat	Israel T. Canby	2
Total		≈39,118

=== Results by county ===
The following table compares the votes for the leading Democratic and National Republican electors in each county. It therefore differs slightly from the summary stated above, which compares the votes for the leading electors statewide.

1832 United States presidential election in Indiana by county
County	Andrew Jackson Democratic		John Quincy Adams National Republican		Margin		Total
County	Votes	%	Votes	%	Votes	%	Total
Allen	64	46.38%	74	53.62%	-10	−7.25%	138
Bartholomew	445	65.44%	235	34.56%	210	30.88%	680
Clark	953	60.78%	615	39.22%	338	21.56%	1,568
Clay	83	76.85%	25	23.15%	58	53.70%	108
Crawford	230	52.75%	206	47.25%	24	5.50%	436
Daviess	291	58.08%	210	41.92%	81	15.88%	501
Dearborn	1,066	51.85%	986	47.96%	86	4.18%	2,056
Decatur	346	54.23%	292	45.77%	54	8.46%	638
Delaware	91	59.09%	63	40.91%	28	18.18%	154
Dubois	180	78.60%	49	21.40%	131	57.21%	229
Fayette	650	55.75%	516	44.25%	134	11.49%	1,166
Floyd	590	61.20%	374	38.80%	216	22.41%	964
Fountain	468	67.63%	224	32.37%	244	35.26%	692
Franklin	693	51.37%	656	48.63%	37	2.74%	1,349
Gibson	380	61.39%	239	38.61%	141	22.78%	619
Greene	320	66.53%	161	33.47%	159	33.06%	481
Hamilton	55	26.07%	156	73.93%	-101	−47.87%	211
Hancock	65	49.24%	67	50.76%	-2	−1.52%	132
Harrison	705	60.67%	457	39.33%	248	21.34%	1,162
Hendricks	204	124.39%	164	44.57%	40	10.87%	368
Henry	284	46.41%	328	53.59%	-44	−7.19%	612
Jackson	405	68.99%	182	31.01%	223	37.99%	587
Jefferson	627	46.93%	709	53.07%	-82	−6.14%	1,336
Jennings	204	41.30%	290	58.70%	-86	−20.82%	494
Johnson	298	75.06%	199	50.13%	99	24.94%	397
Knox	420	50.91%	405	49.09%	15	1.82%	825
Lawrence	823	79.44%	213	20.56%	610	58.88%	1,036
Madison	58	44.62%	72	55.38%	-14	−10.77%	130
Marion	379	39.44%	582	60.56%	-203	−21.12%	961
Martin	191	73.75%	68	26.25%	123	47.49%	259
Monroe	570	71.88%	223	28.12%	343	43.25%	793
Montgomery	359	59.63%	243	40.37%	116	19.27%	602
Morgan	235	50.32%	232	49.68%	3	0.64%	467
Orange	631	68.89%	285	31.11%	346	37.77%	916
Owen	187	48.20%	201	69.79%	-14	−3.61%	388
Parke	480	58.61%	339	41.39%	141	17.22%	819
Perry	134	42.68%	180	57.32%	-46	−14.65%	314
Pike	149	51.56%	140	48.44%	9	3.11%	289
Posey	646	69.91%	278	30.09%	368	39.83%	924
Putnam	632	67.16%	309	32.84%	323	34.33%	941
Randolph	123	32.98%	250	67.02%	127	34.05%	373
Ripley	307	48.58%	325	51.42%	-18	−2.85%	632
Rush	649	65.29%	345	34.71%	304	30.58%	994
Scott	283	65.81%	147	34.19%	136	31.63%	430
Shelby	458	59.64%	310	40.36%	148	19.27%	768
Spencer	173	68.38%	80	31.62%	93	36.76%	253
Sullivan	432	72.00%	168	28.00%	264	44.00%	600
Switzerland	439	56.72%	335	43.28%	104	13.44%	774
Tippecanoe	210	53.30%	184	46.70%	26	6.60%	394
Union	547	51.36%	518	48.64%	29	2.72%	1,065
Vanderburgh	108	44.63%	134	55.37%	-26	−10.74%	242
Vermillion	282	49.56%	287	50.44%	-5	−0.88%	569
Vigo	186	25.48%	544	74.52%	-358	−49.04%	730
Warren	63	45.00%	77	55.00%	-14	−10.00%	140
Warrick	318	81.33%	73	18.67%	245	62.66%	391
Washington	1,083	63.89%	612	36.11%	471	27.79%	1,695
Wayne	888	39.80%	1,343	60.20%	-455	−20.39%	2,231
TOTAL	22,140	56.60%	16,979	43.40%	5,161	13.19%	39,119

== See also ==
- United States presidential elections in Indiana

== Bibliography ==
- "1828 Electoral College Results". National Archives.
- Lampi, Philip J. (n.d.). "Electoral College". A New Nation Votes. American Antiquarian Society.
- Madison, James H. (1986). The Indiana Way: A State History. Bloomington: Indiana University Press.
- Ratcliffe, Donald J. (Spring 2014). "Popular Preferences in the Presidential Election of 1824". Journal of the Early Republic. 34 (1): 45–77. JSTOR 24486931.
- Riker, Dorothy; Thornbrough, Gayle, eds. (1960). Indiana Election Returns, 1816–1851. Indianapolis: Indiana Historical Bureau.
