= United States presidential elections in Indiana =

United States presidential election results in Indiana from 1864 to present

Presidential elections in Indiana
- Number of elections: 53
- Voted Democratic: 14
- Voted Republican: 34
- Voted Whig: 2
- Voted Democratic-Republican: 3
- Voted other: 0
- Voted for winning candidate: 40
- Voted for losing candidate: 13

Following is a table of United States presidential elections in Indiana, ordered by year. Since its admission to statehood in 1816, Indiana has participated in every U.S. presidential election.

Winners of the state are in bold. The shading refers to the state winner, and not the national winner.

== Elections from 1864 to present ==
View source data.

Year	Winner (nationally)	Votes	Percent	Runner-up (nationally)	Votes	Percent	Other national candidates (Note: For purposes of these lists, other national candidates are defined as those who won at least one electoral vote, or won at least ten percent of the vote in multiple states.)	Votes	Percent	Electoral votes	Notes
2024	**Donald Trump**	1,720,347	58.58	Kamala Harris	1,163,603	39.62	—			11	
2020	Joe Biden	1,242,416	40.96	**Donald Trump**	1,729,516	57.02	—			11	
2016	**Donald Trump** (Note: Won the electoral college while losing the popular vote)	1,557,286	56.47	Hillary Clinton	1,033,126	37.46	—			11	
2012	Barack Obama	1,152,887	43.93	**Mitt Romney**	1,420,543	54.13	-			11	
2008	**Barack Obama**	1,374,039	49.95	John McCain	1,345,648	48.91	-			11	
2004	**George W. Bush**	1,479,438	59.94	John Kerry	969,011	39.26	-			11	
2000	**George W. Bush**	1,245,836	56.65	Al Gore	901,980	41.01	-			12	
1996	Bill Clinton	887,424	41.55	**Bob Dole**	1,006,693	47.13	Ross Perot	224,299	10.50	12	
1992	Bill Clinton	848,420	36.79	**George H. W. Bush**	989,375	42.91	Ross Perot	455,934	19.77	12	
1988	**George H. W. Bush**	1,297,763	59.84	Michael Dukakis	860,643	39.69	-			12	
1984	**Ronald Reagan**	1,377,230	61.67	Walter Mondale	841,481	37.68	-			12	
1980	**Ronald Reagan**	1,255,656	56.01	Jimmy Carter	844,197	37.65	John B. Anderson	111,639	4.98	13	
1976	Jimmy Carter	1,014,714	45.70	**Gerald Ford**	1,183,958	53.32	-			13	
1972	**Richard Nixon**	1,405,154	66.11	George McGovern	708,568	33.34	-			13	
1968	**Richard Nixon**	1,067,885	50.29	Hubert Humphrey	806,659	37.99	George Wallace	243,108	11.45	13	
1964	**Lyndon B. Johnson**	1,170,848	55.98	Barry Goldwater	911,118	43.56	-			13	
1960	John F. Kennedy	952,358	44.60	**Richard Nixon**	1,175,120	55.03	-			13	
1956	**Dwight D. Eisenhower**	1,182,811	59.90	Adlai Stevenson II	783,908	39.70	T. Coleman Andrews/ Unpledged Electors (Note: Was allied with a slate of unpledged electors in Louisiana, Mississippi and South Carolina)	-		13	
1952	**Dwight D. Eisenhower**	1,136,259	58.11	Adlai Stevenson II	801,530	40.99	-			13	
1948	Harry S. Truman	807,833	48.78	**Thomas E. Dewey**	821,079	49.58	Strom Thurmond	-		13	
1944	Franklin D. Roosevelt	781,403	46.73	**Thomas E. Dewey**	875,891	52.38	-			13	
1940	Franklin D. Roosevelt	874,063	49.03	**Wendell Willkie**	899,466	50.45	-			14	
1936	**Franklin D. Roosevelt**	934,974	56.63	Alf Landon	691,570	41.89	-			14	
1932	**Franklin D. Roosevelt**	862,054	54.67	Herbert Hoover	677,184	42.94	-			14	
1928	**Herbert Hoover**	848,290	59.68	Al Smith	562,691	39.59	-			15	
1924	**Calvin Coolidge**	703,042	55.25	John W. Davis	492,245	38.69	Robert M. La Follette	71,700	5.64	15	
1920	**Warren G. Harding**	696,370	55.14	James M. Cox	511,364	40.49	Parley P. Christensen	16,499	1.31	15	
1916	Woodrow Wilson	334,063	46.47	**Charles E. Hughes**	341,005	47.44	-			15	
1912	**Woodrow Wilson**	281,890	43.07	Theodore Roosevelt	162,007	24.75	William H. Taft	151,267	23.11	15	
1908	**William H. Taft**	348,993	48.40	William Jennings Bryan	338,262	46.91	-			15	
1904	**Theodore Roosevelt**	368,289	53.99	Alton B. Parker	274,345	40.22	-			15	
1900	**William McKinley**	336,063	50.60	William Jennings Bryan	309,584	46.62	-			15	
1896	**William McKinley**	323,754	50.82	William Jennings Bryan	305,573	47.96	-			15	
1892	**Grover Cleveland**	262,740	47.46	Benjamin Harrison	255,615	46.17	James B. Weaver	22,208	4.01	15	
1888	**Benjamin Harrison**	263,361	49.05	Grover Cleveland	261,013	48.61	-			15	
1884	**Grover Cleveland**	245,005	49.46	James G. Blaine	238,489	48.15	-			15	
1880	**James A. Garfield**	232,164	49.33	Winfield S. Hancock	225,522	47.91	James B. Weaver	12,986	2.76	15	
1876	Rutherford B. Hayes	208,011	47.39	**Samuel J. Tilden**	213,526	48.65	-			15	
1872	**Ulysses S. Grant**	186,147	53.00	Horace Greeley	163,632	46.59	-			15	
1868	**Ulysses S. Grant**	176,548	51.4	Horatio Seymour	166,980	48.6	-			13	
1864	**Abraham Lincoln**	149,887	53.5	George B. McClellan	130,230	46.5	-			13	

== Election of 1860 ==
The election of 1860 was a complex realigning election in which the breakdown of the previous two-party alignment culminated in four parties each competing for influence in different parts of the country. The result of the election, with the victory of an ardent opponent of slavery, spurred the secession of eleven states and brought about the American Civil War.

Year	Winner (nationally)	Votes	Percent	Runner-up (nationally)	Votes	Percent	Runner-up (nationally)	Votes	Percent	Runner-up (nationally)	Votes	Percent	Electoral votes
1860	**Abraham Lincoln**	139,033	51.1	Stephen A. Douglas	115,509	42.4	John C. Breckinridge	12,295	4.5	John Bell	5,306	1.9	13

== Elections from 1828 to 1856 ==
Year	Winner (nationally)	Votes	Percent	Runner-up (nationally)	Votes	Percent	Other national candidates	Votes	Percent	Electoral votes	Notes
1856	**James Buchanan**	118,670	50.41	John C. Frémont	94,375	40.09	Millard Fillmore	22,386	9.51	13	
1852	**Franklin Pierce**	95,340	52.05	Winfield Scott	80,901	44.17	John P. Hale	6,929	3.78	13	
1848	Zachary Taylor	69,907	45.77	**Lewis Cass**	74,745	48.93	Martin Van Buren	8,100	5.3	12	
1844	**James K. Polk**	70,181	50.07	Henry Clay	67,867	48.42	-			12	
1840	**William Henry Harrison**	65,302	55.86	Martin Van Buren	51,604	44.14	-			9	
1836	Martin Van Buren	32,478	44.03	**William Henry Harrison**	41,281	55.97	various (Note: Three other candidates ran and received electoral votes nationally as part of the unsuccessful Whig strategy to defeat Martin Van Buren by running four candidates with local appeal in different regions of the country. The others were Hugh Lawson White, Daniel Webster, and Willie Person Mangum. None of these candidates appeared on the ballot in Indiana.)			9	
1832	**Andrew Jackson**	31,551	67.1	Henry Clay	15,472	32.9	William Wirt	no ballots		9	
1828	**Andrew Jackson**	22,201	56.62	John Quincy Adams	17,009	43.38	-			5	

== Election of 1824 ==
The election of 1824 was a complex realigning election following the collapse of the prevailing Democratic-Republican Party, resulting in four different candidates each claiming to carry the banner of the party, and competing for influence in different parts of the country. The election was the only one in history to be decided by the House of Representatives under the provisions of the Twelfth Amendment to the United States Constitution after no candidate secured a majority of the electoral vote. It was also the only presidential election in which the candidate who received a plurality of electoral votes (Andrew Jackson) did not become president, a source of great bitterness for Jackson and his supporters, who proclaimed the election of Adams a corrupt bargain.

Year	Winner (nationally)	Votes	Percent	Runner-up (nationally)	Votes	Percent	Runner-up (nationally)	Votes	Percent	Runner-up (nationally)	Votes	Percent	Electoral votes
1824	**Andrew Jackson**	7,343	46.61	John Quincy Adams	3,095	19.65	Henry Clay	5,315	33.74	William H. Crawford	no ballots	-	5

== Elections of 1816 and 1820 ==
In the election of 1820, incumbent President James Monroe ran effectively unopposed, winning all three of Indiana's electoral votes, and all electoral votes nationwide except one vote in New Hampshire. To the extent that a popular vote was held, it was primarily directed to filling the office of vice president.

The election of 1816 was contested between James Monroe and Rufus King. In this election, Indiana did not conduct a popular vote. Each Elector was appointed by state legislature, which assigned all three of Indiana's electoral votes to Monroe.

== See also ==
- Elections in Indiana
