= 1844 United States presidential election in Indiana =

- November 4, 1844
- Turnout: 84.7% ▲0.3 pp

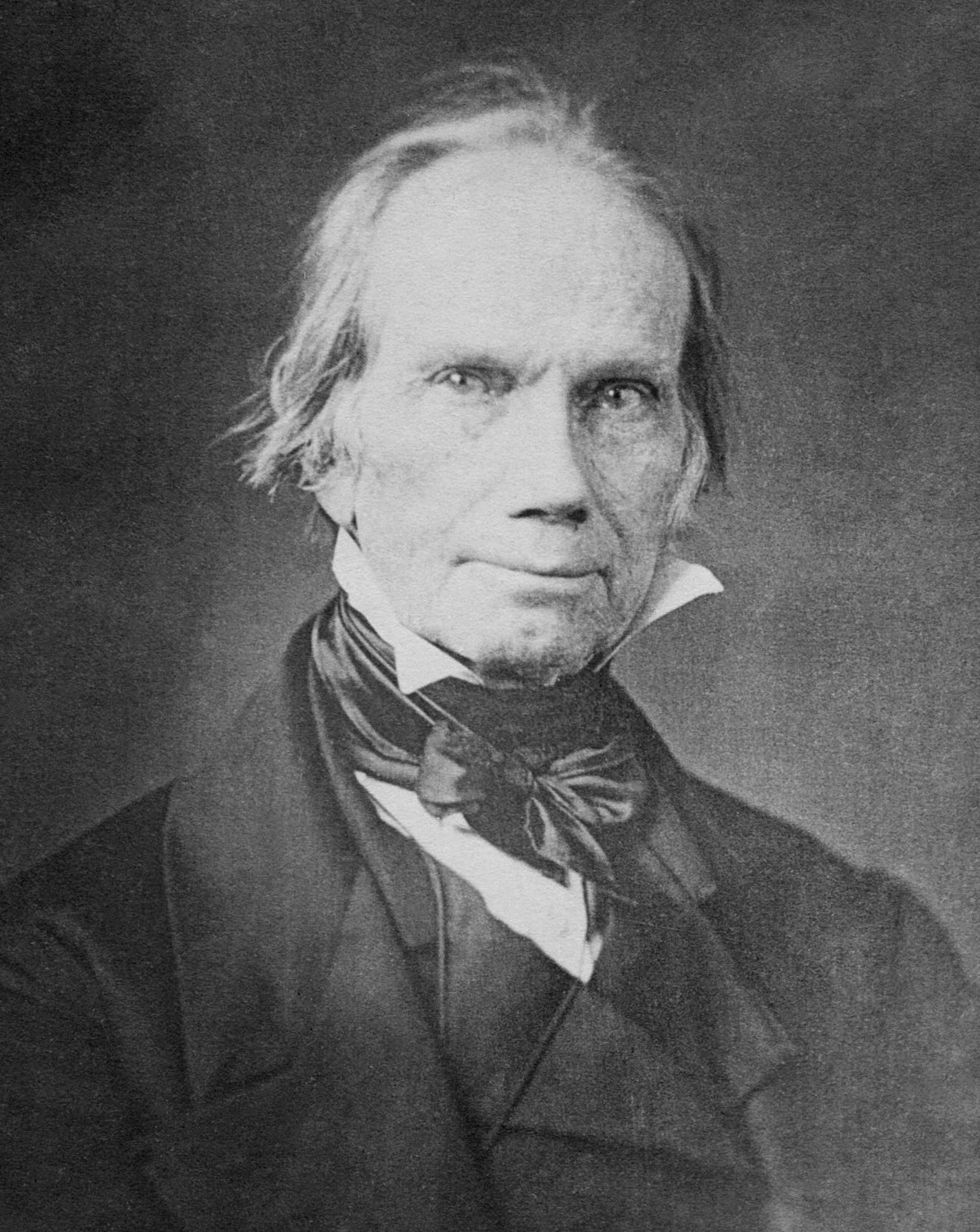
Nominee	James K. Polk	Henry Clay
Party	Democratic	Whig
Home state	Tennessee	Kentucky
Running mate	George M. Dallas (Note: Replacing Silas Wright.)	Theodore Frelinghuysen
Electoral vote	12	0
Popular vote	70,183	67,866
Percentage	50.07%	48.42%
County results
Polk
40–50%
50–60%
60–70%
70–80%
80–90%
Clay
40–50%
50–60%
60–70%
President before election
John Tyler
Independent
Elected President
James K. Polk
Democratic

A presidential election was held in Indiana on November 4, 1844, as part of the 1844 United States presidential election. The Democratic ticket of the former governor of Tennessee James K. Polk and the former U.S. minister to Russia George M. Dallas defeated the Whig ticket of the former U.S. senator from Kentucky Henry Clay and the chancellor of New York University Theodore Frelinghuysen. Polk defeated Clay in the national election with 170 electoral votes.

== General election ==
=== Summary ===
Result for the Liberty Party electors in each Indiana county

Indiana chose 12 electors in a statewide general election. Nineteenth-century presidential elections used a form of block voting that allowed voters to modify the electoral list nominated by a political party before submitting their ballots. Because voters elected each member of the Electoral College individually, electors nominated by the same party often received differing numbers of votes as a consequence of voter rolloff, split-ticket voting, or electoral fusion. This table compares the votes for the most popular elector pledged to each ticket, to give an approximate sense of the statewide result.

1844 United States presidential election in Indiana
Party	Candidate	Votes	%	±%
Democratic	James K. Polk George M. Dallas	70,183	50.07	▲5.11
Whig	Henry Clay Theodore Frelinghuysen	67,866	48.42	▼6.59
Liberty	James G. Birney Thomas Earle	2,107	1.50	▲1.47
Total votes		140,156	100.00	

=== Results ===
1844 United States presidential election in Indiana
Party	Candidate	Votes
Democratic	John M. Johnston	70,183
Democratic	Paris C. Dunning	70,182
Democratic	Samuel E. Perkins	70,182
Democratic	James G. Read	70,182
Democratic	William W. Wick	70,181
Democratic	Graham N. Fitch	70,179
Democratic	Elijah Newland	70,179
Democratic	Austin M. Puett	70,179
Democratic	William A. Bowles	70,178
Democratic	Charles W. Cathcart	70,172
Democratic	Henry W. Ellsworth	70,170
Democratic	John Gilbert	70,151
Whig	John A. Brackenridge	67,866
Whig	Henry S. Lane	67,864
Whig	John A. Matson	67,865
Whig	Samuel W. Parker	67,865
Whig	Richard W. Thompson	67,864
Whig	George Grundy Dunn	67,863
Whig	Albert L. Holmes	67,863
Whig	Hugh O'Neal	67,863
Whig	Joseph G. Marshall	67,861
Whig	Horace P. Biddle	67,860
Whig	James Collins Jr.	67,854
Whig	Lewis G. Thompson	67,749
Liberty	Ziba Casterline	2,107
Liberty	Matthew R. Hull	2,107
Liberty	Benjamin S. Noble	2,106
Liberty	Stephen Stevens	2,106
Liberty	Eli J. Sumner	2,106
Liberty	Roger Ide	2,102
Liberty	Daniel Worth	2,100
Liberty	Elizur Deming	2,096
Liberty	Stephen S. Harding	2,096
Liberty	William Benbow	2,089
Liberty	John K. Lovejoy	1,780
Liberty	John J. Deming	1,078
Liberty	E. Davis	731
Unpledged	William Paul	8
Unpledged	Thomas Gail	6
Unpledged	Lucian P. Ferry	5
Unpledged	Tilghman Howard	2
Unpledged	Thomas Beckford	1
Unpledged	William Berford	1
Unpledged	John Boggs	1
Unpledged	Lewis Falley	1
Unpledged	William Hughes	1
Total		≈140,156

== See also ==
- United States presidential elections in Indiana

== Bibliography ==
- "1844 Electoral College Results". National Archives.
- Lampi, Philip J. (n.d.). "Electoral College". A New Nation Votes. American Antiquarian Society.
- Madison, James H. (1986). The Indiana Way: A State History. Bloomington: Indiana University Press.
- Presidential Elections, 1844. [Boston]. 1844.
- Ratcliffe, Donald J. (Spring 2014). "Popular Preferences in the Presidential Election of 1824". Journal of the Early Republic. 34 (1): 45–77. JSTOR 24486931.
- Riker, Dorothy; Thornbrough, Gayle, eds. (1960). Indiana Election Returns, 1816–1851. Indianapolis: Indiana Historical Bureau.
- Wilentz, Sean (2005). The Rise of American Democracy: Jefferson to Lincoln. New York: W. W. Norton and Company.
