= 1852 United States presidential election in Indiana =

- November 2, 1852
- Turnout: 80.3% ▲1.8 pp
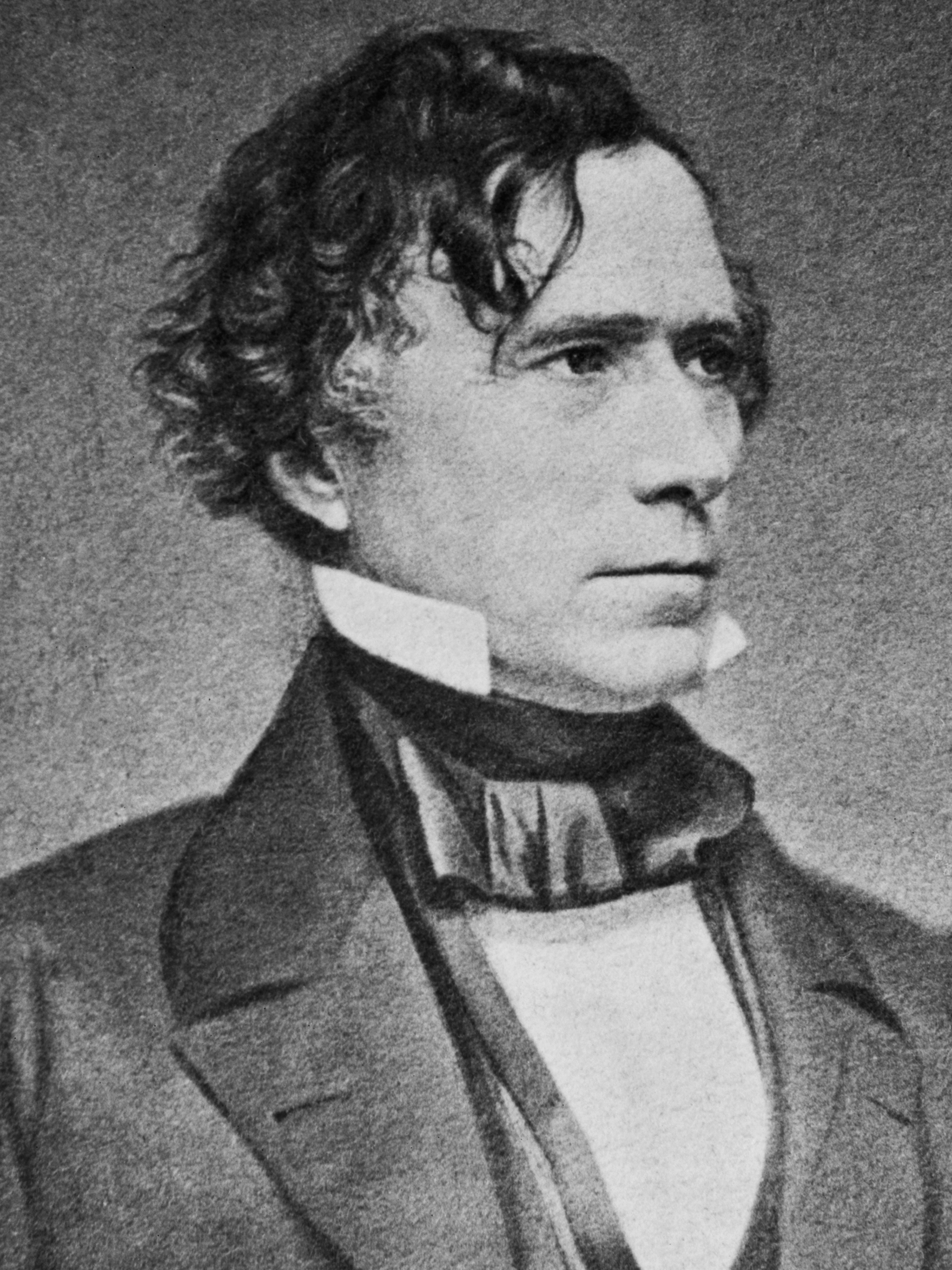

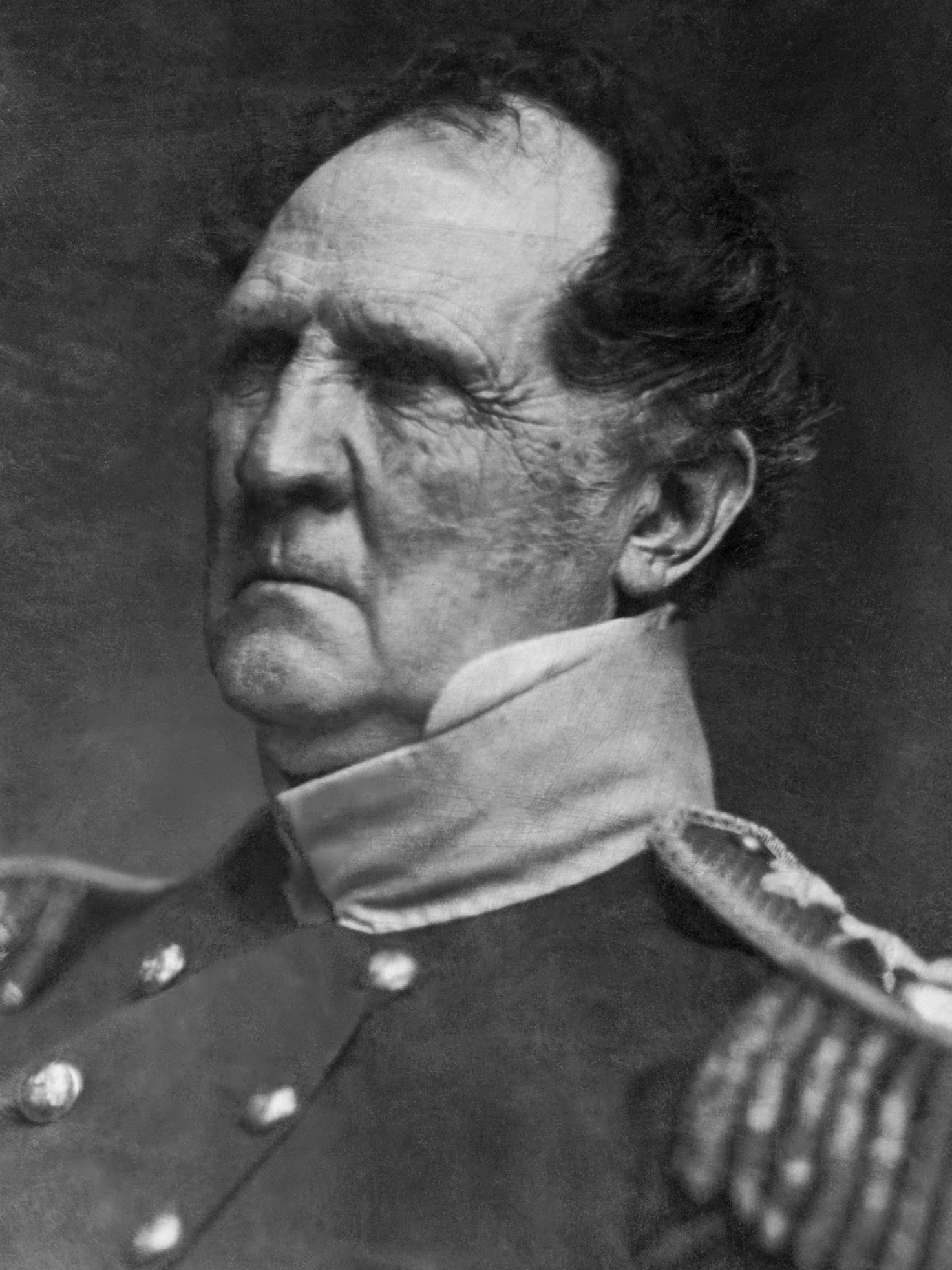
Nominee	Franklin Pierce	Winfield Scott
Party	Democratic	Whig
Home state	New Hampshire	New Jersey
Running mate	William R. King	William Alexander Graham
Electoral vote	13	0
Popular vote	94,890	80,901
Percentage	51.93%	44.28%
County results
Pierce
40–50%
50–60%
60–70%
70–80%
80–90%
Scott
40–50%
50–60%
President before election
Millard Fillmore
Whig
Elected President
Franklin Pierce
Democratic

A presidential election was held in Indiana on November 2, 1852, as part of the 1852 United States presidential election. The Democratic ticket of the former U.S. senator from New Hampshire Franklin Pierce and the senior U.S. senator from Alabama William R. King defeated the Whig ticket of the major general Winfield Scott and the U.S. secretary of the navy William A. Graham. The Free Soil ticket of the senior U.S. senator from New Hampshire John P. Hale and the former U.S. representative from Indiana's 4th congressional district George W. Julian finished a distant third. Pierce defeated Scott in the national election with 254 electoral votes.

== General election ==
=== Statistics ===
This was the last time Porter County voted for a Democratic presidential candidate until Bill Clinton won a plurality in 1996.

=== Summary ===
Indiana chose 13 electors in a statewide general election. Nineteenth-century presidential elections used a form of block voting that allowed voters to modify the electoral list nominated by a political party before submitting their ballots. Because voters elected each member of the Electoral College individually, electors nominated by the same party often received differing numbers of votes as a consequence of voter rolloff, split-ticket voting, or electoral fusion. This table reflects the statewide popular vote as calculated by Michael J. Dubin.

1852 United States presidential election in Indiana
Party	Candidate	Votes	%	±%
Democratic	Franklin Pierce William R. King	94,890	51.93	▲3.11
Whig	Winfield Scott William Alexander Graham	80,901	44.28	▼1.59
Free Soil	John P. Hale George W. Julian	6,928	3.79	▼1.51
Total votes		182,719	100.00	

=== Maps ===
Result for the Free Soil electors by county

== See also ==
- United States presidential elections in Indiana

== Bibliography ==
- "1852 Electoral College Results". National Archives.
- Dubin, Michael J. (2002). United States Presidential Elections, 1788-1860. Jefferson, NC: McFarland & Co. ISBN 978-0-7864-6422-7.
- Lampi, Philip J. (n.d.). "Electoral College". A New Nation Votes. American Antiquarian Society.
- Madison, James H. (1986). The Indiana Way: A State History. Bloomington: Indiana University Press.
- Menendez, Albert J. (2005). The Geography of Presidential Elections in the United States, 1868-2004. Jefferson, NC: McFarland and Company.
- Ratcliffe, Donald J. (Spring 2014). "Popular Preferences in the Presidential Election of 1824". Journal of the Early Republic. 34 (1): 45–77. JSTOR 24486931.
