= 1832 United States presidential election in Indiana =

- November 5, 1832
- Turnout: 71.9% ▲3.2 pp
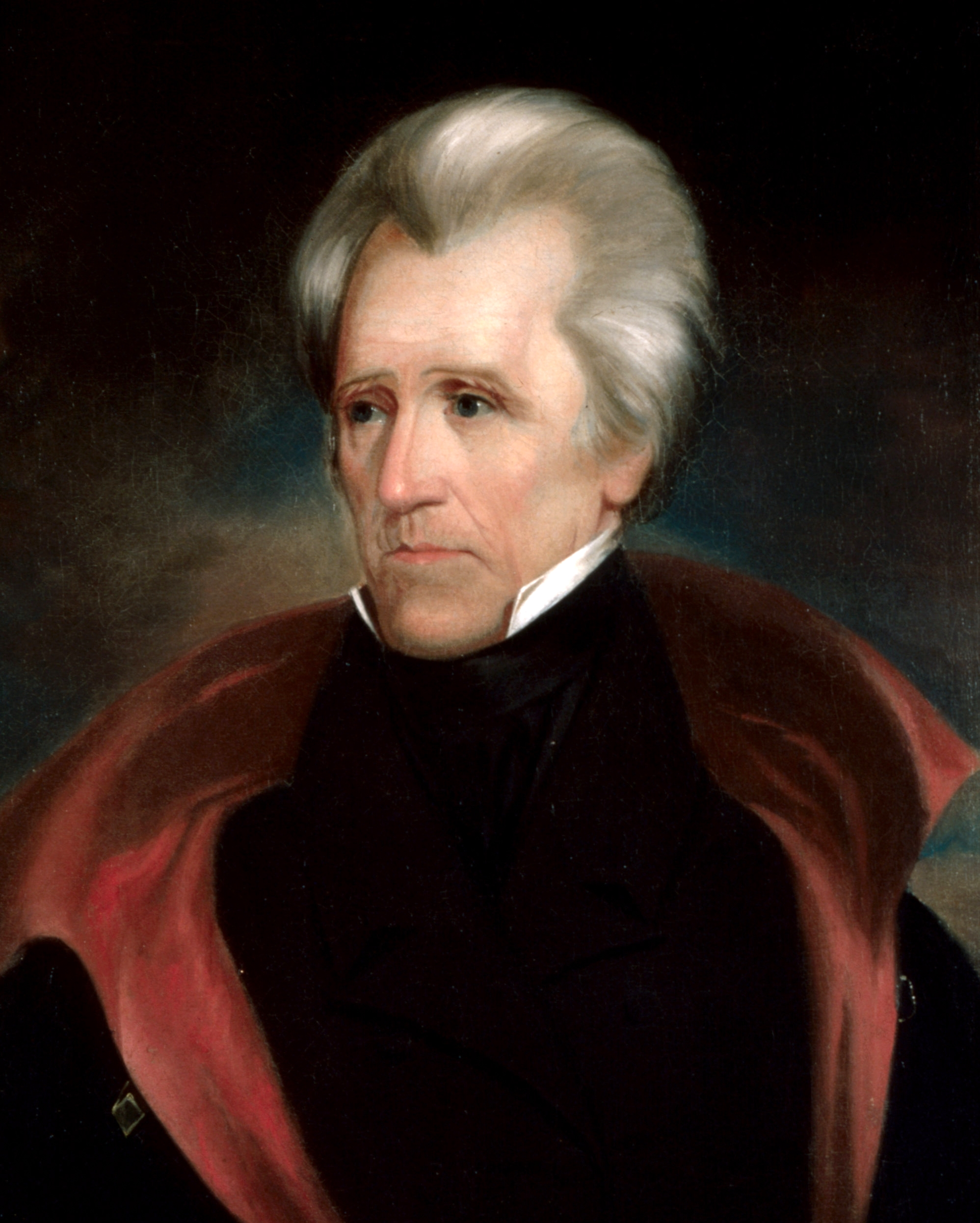

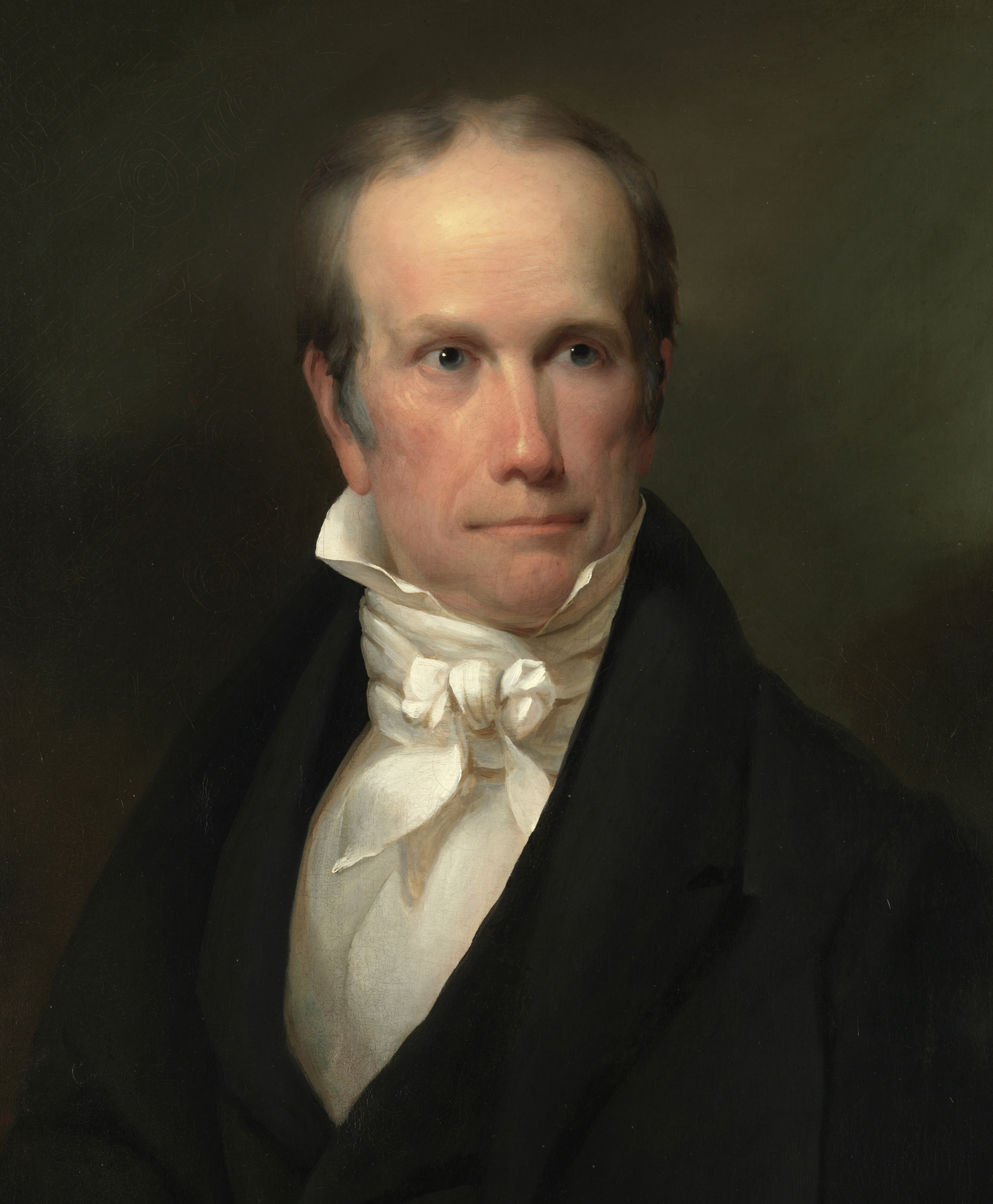
Nominee	Andrew Jackson	Henry Clay
Party	Democratic	National Republican
Home state	Tennessee	Kentucky
Running mate	Martin Van Buren	John Sergeant
Electoral vote	9	0
Popular vote	31,406	25,238
Percentage	55.42%	44.53%
County results
Jackson
40–50%
50–60%
60–70%
70–80%
80–90%
Clay
50–60%
60–70%
Tie
50%
Unknown/No vote
President before election
Andrew Jackson
Democratic
Elected President
Andrew Jackson
Democratic

A presidential election was held in Indiana on November 5, 1832, as part of the 1832 United States presidential election. The Democratic ticket of the incumbent president Andrew Jackson and the U.S. minister to Great Britain Martin Van Buren defeated the National Republican ticket of the junior U.S. senator from Kentucky Henry Clay and the former U.S. representative from Pennsylvania's 2nd congressional district John Sergeant. Jackson defeated Clay in the national election with 219 electoral votes.

== General election ==
=== Summary ===
Indiana chose nine electors in a statewide general election. Nineteenth-century presidential elections used a form of block voting that allowed voters to modify the electoral list nominated by a political party before submitting their ballots. Because voters elected each member of the Electoral College individually, electors nominated by the same party often received differing numbers of votes as a consequence of voter rolloff, split-ticket voting, or electoral fusion. This table compares the votes for the most popular elector pledged to each ticket, to give an approximate sense of the statewide result.

1832 United States presidential election in Indiana
Party	Candidate	Votes	%	±%
Democratic	Andrew Jackson Martin Van Buren	31,406	55.42	▼1.18
National Republican	Henry Clay John Sergeant	25,238	44.53	▲1.13
Anti-Masonic	William Wirt Amos Ellmaker	27	0.05	▲0.05
Total votes		56,671	100.00	

=== Results ===
1832 United States presidential election in Indiana
Party	Candidate	Votes
Democratic	James Blake	31,406
Democratic	George Boon	31,404
Democratic	Marks Crume	31,389
Democratic	Nathan B. Palmer	31,387
Democratic	Arthur Patterson	31,387
Democratic	John Ketcham	31,387
Democratic	Alexander S. Burnett	31,386
Democratic	Walter Armstrong	31,377
Democratic	Nathan B. Palmer	31,260
Democratic	Arthur Patterson	31,387
National Republican	Stephen Ludlow	25,238
National Republican	John Hawkins	25,237
National Republican	Jacob Kuykendall	25,237
National Republican	Abel Lomax	25,237
National Republican	John I. Neely	25,237
National Republican	Walter Wilson	25,237
National Republican	Sylvanus Everts	25,236
National Republican	Dennis Pennington	25,236
National Republican	Samuel Henderson	25,233
Anti-Masonic	Daniel Bardon (Note: Also called David Bardon.)	27
Anti-Masonic	Aaron Davis	27
Anti-Masonic	Cyrus Douglass	27
Anti-Masonic	Aaron Farmer	27
Anti-Masonic	Andrew House (Note: Also called Andrew Housh.)	27
Anti-Masonic	David Jewett (Note: Also called David Jerrett or David Spencett.)	27
Anti-Masonic	David G. Mitchell	27
Anti-Masonic	John Morgan	27
Anti-Masonic	Hugh Morse	27
Total		56,671

=== Results by county ===
This table compares the result for the most popular Democratic and National Republican electors in each county. The totals presented thus differ slightly from the statewide results summary, which compares the results for the most popular elector pledged to each ticket statewide.

County	Andrew Jackson Democratic		Henry Clay National Republican		William Wirt Anti-Masonic		Margin		Total
County	Votes	Percent	Votes	Percent	Votes	Percent	Votes	Percent	Total
Allen	126	56.25	98	43.75	—		28	12.50	224
Bartholomew	489	56.47	372	42.96	5	0.58	117	13.51	866
Boone	216	63.34	125	36.66	—		91	26.69	341
Carroll	258	59.86	173	40.14	—		85	19.72	431
Cass	162	51.43	153	48.57	—		9	2.86	315
Clark	1,058	67.82	502	32.18	—		556	35.64	1,560
Clay	230	86.47	36	13.53	—		194	72.93	266
Clinton	252	58.88	176	41.12	—		76	17.76	428
Crawford	222	57.22	166	42.78	—		56	14.43	388
Daviess	363	53.54	315	46.46	—		48	7.08	678
Dearborn	1,198	49.96	1,197	49.92	3	0.13	1	0.04	2,398
Decatur	405	42.86	539	57.04	1	0.11	-134	-14.18	945
Delaware	197	63.75	112	36.25	—		85	27.51	309
Dubois	191	69.96	82	30.04	—		109	39.93	273
Elkhart	129	68.25	60	31.75	—		69	36.51	189
Fayette	762	50.00	762	50.00	—		0	0.00	1,524
Floyd	625	58.91	436	41.09	—		189	17.81	1,061
Fountain	920	62.20	559	37.80	—		361	24.40	1,479
Franklin	738	48.14	790	51.53	5	0.33	-52	-3.39	1,533
Gibson	446	51.86	414	48.14	—		32	3.72	860
Grant	34	50.75	33	49.25	—		1	1.49	67
Greene	471	72.35	180	27.65	—		291	44.70	651
Hamilton	166	39.81	251	60.19	—		-85	-20.38	417
Hancock	310	63.39	179	36.61	—		131	26.79	489
Harrison	603	58.60	426	41.40	—		177	17.20	1,029
Hendricks	483	56.36	374	43.64	—		109	12.72	857
Henry	583	43.12	769	56.88	—		-186	-13.76	1,352
Jackson	533	62.41	321	37.59	—		212	24.82	854
Jefferson	730	51.01	700	48.99	—		30	2.10	1,430
Jennings	317	46.76	355	52.36	6	0.88	-38	-5.60	678
Johnson	653	70.22	270	29.03	7	0.75	383	41.18	930
Knox	482	46.16	561	53.84	—		-79	-7.57	1,043
LaGrange	44	54.32	37	45.68	—		7	8.64	81
LaPorte	46	43.81	59	56.19	—		-13	-12.38	105
Lawrence	877	70.44	368	29.56	—		509	40.88	1,245
Madison	287	56.94	217	43.06	—		70	13.89	504
Marion	771	48.55	817	51.45	—		-46	-2.90	1,588
Martin	202	68.94	91	31.06	—		111	37.88	293
Monroe	811	77.53	235	22.47	—		576	55.07	1,046
Montgomery	796	55.47	639	44.53	—		157	10.94	1,435
Morgan	522	55.59	417	44.41	—		105	11.18	939
Orange	615	62.76	365	37.24	—		250	25.51	980
Owen	322	53.58	279	46.42	—		43	7.15	601
Parke	882	62.03	540	37.97	—		342	24.05	1,422
Perry (Note: Including rejected returns from Anderson, Clark, and Union townships.)	170	43.04	225	56.96	—		-55	-13.92	395
Pike	186	51.67	174	48.33	—		12	3.33	360
Posey	623	67.28	303	32.72	—		320	34.56	926
Putnam	950	65.84	493	34.16	—		457	31.67	1,443
Randolph (Note: Including rejected returns from Ward and Washington townships.)	192	35.23	353	64.77	—		-161	-29.54	545
Ripley	393	46.95	444	53.05	—		-51	-6.09	837
Rush	928	53.83	796	46.17	—		132	7.66	1,724
St. Joseph	121	49.59	123	50.41	—		-2	-0.82	244
Scott	342	66.67	171	33.33	—		171	33.33	513
Shelby	733	60.18	485	39.82	—		248	20.36	1,218
Spencer	139	62.33	84	37.67	—		55	24.66	223
Sullivan	648	80.20	160	19.80	—		488	60.40	808
Switzerland	520	49.29	535	50.71	—		-15	-1.42	1,055
Tippecanoe (Note: Including rejected ballots.)	765	55.16	622	44.84	—		143	10.31	1,387
Union	568	46.90	643	53.10	—		-75	-6.19	1,211
Vanderburgh	102	37.50	170	62.50	—		-68	-25.00	272
Vermillion	545	55.90	430	44.10	—		115	11.79	975
Vigo	425	40.02	637	59.98	—		-212	-19.96	1,062
Warren	266	46.91	301	53.09	—		-35	-6.17	567
Warrick	354	74.53	121	25.47	—		233	49.05	475
Washington	1,088	63.59	623	36.41	—		465	27.18	1,711
Wayne	1,072	34.55	2,031	65.45	—		-959	-30.90	3,103
TOTAL	31,657	55.38	25,474	44.57	27	0.05	6,183	10.82	57,158

== See also ==
- United States presidential elections in Indiana

== Bibliography ==
- "1832 Electoral College Results". National Archives.
- Lampi, Philip J. (n.d.). "Electoral College". A New Nation Votes. American Antiquarian Society.
- Madison, James H. (1986). The Indiana Way: A State History. Bloomington: Indiana University Press.
- Ratcliffe, Donald J. (Spring 2014). "Popular Preferences in the Presidential Election of 1824". Journal of the Early Republic. 34 (1): 45–77. JSTOR 24486931.
- Riker, Dorothy; Thornbrough, Gayle, eds. (1960). Indiana Election Returns, 1816–1851. Indianapolis: Indiana Historical Bureau.
