= 1848 United States presidential election in Indiana =

- November 7, 1848
- Turnout: 78.5% ▼6.2 pp
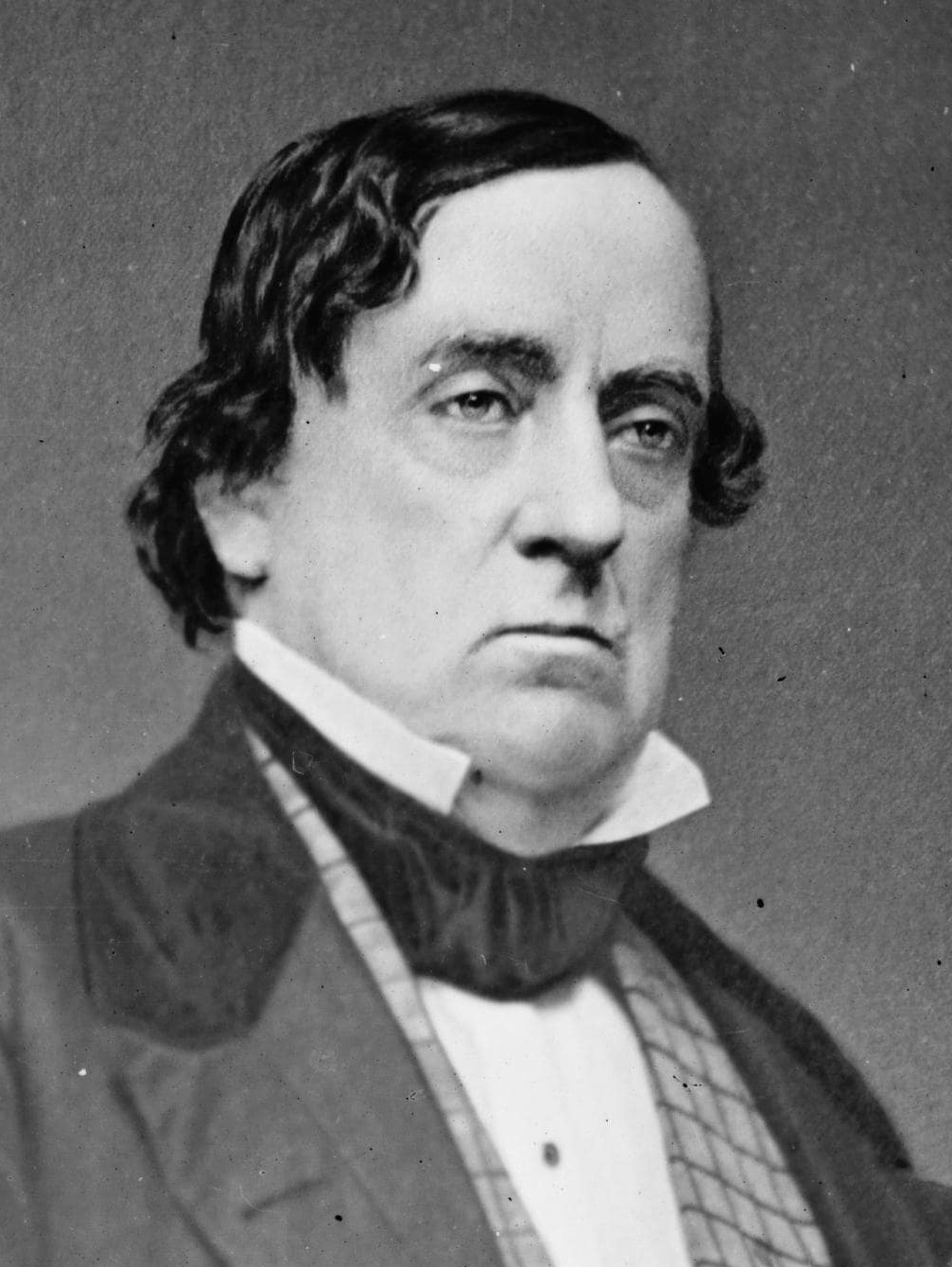

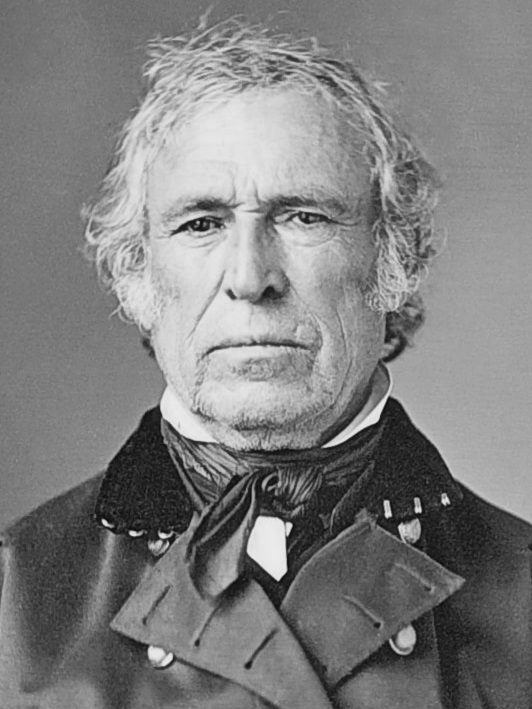

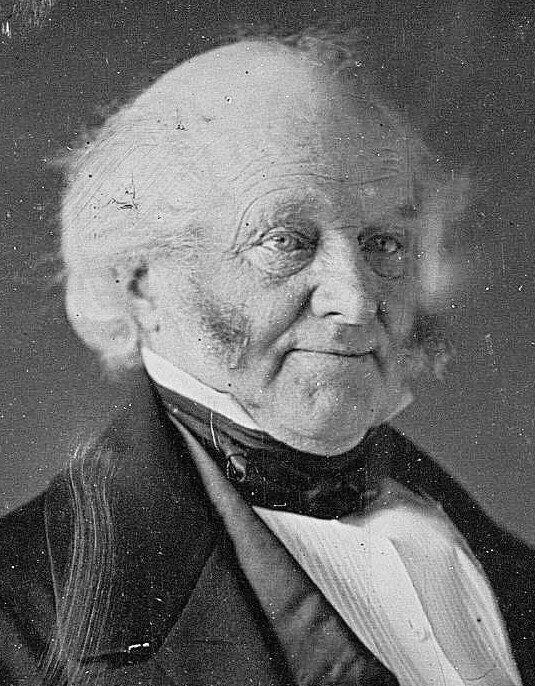
Nominee	Lewis Cass	Zachary Taylor	Martin Van Buren
Party	Democratic	Whig	Free Soil
Home state	Michigan	Louisiana	New York
Running mate	William O. Butler	Millard Fillmore	Charles Francis Adams Sr.
Electoral vote	12	0	0
Popular vote	74,692	70,165	8,100
Percentage	48.82%	45.87%	5.30%
County results
Cass
40–50%
50–60%
60–70%
70–80%
80–90%
Taylor
40–50%
50–60%
60–70%
President before election
James K. Polk
Democratic
Elected President
Zachary Taylor
Whig

A presidential election was held in Indiana on November 7, 1848, as part of the 1848 United States presidential election. The Democratic ticket of the senior U.S. senator from Michigan Lewis Cass and the former U.S. representative from Kentucky's 3rd congressional district William O. Butler defeated the Whig ticket of major general Zachary Taylor and the New York state comptroller Millard Fillmore. The Free Soil ticket of the former president Martin Van Buren and the Massachusetts senator Charles Francis Adams Sr. finished a distant third. Taylor defeated Cass in the national election with 163 electoral votes.

== General election ==
=== Summary ===
Result for the Free Soil Party electors in each Indiana county

Indiana chose 12 electors in a statewide general election. Nineteenth-century presidential elections used a form of block voting that allowed voters to modify the electoral list nominated by a political party before submitting their ballots. Because voters elected each member of the Electoral College individually, electors nominated by the same party often received differing numbers of votes as a consequence of voter rolloff, split-ticket voting, or electoral fusion. This table compares the votes for the most popular elector pledged to each ticket, to give an approximate sense of the statewide result. (Note: Riker and Thornbrough count 18 votes for independent electoral lists in addition to the Democratic, Whig, and Free Soil tickets.)

1848 United States presidential election in Indiana
Party	Candidate	Votes	%	±%
Democratic	Lewis Cass William O. Butler	74,692	48.82	▼1.25
Whig	Zachary Taylor Millard Fillmore	70,175	45.87	▼2.55
Free Soil	Martin Van Buren Charles Francis Adams Sr.	8,102	5.30	▲5.30
Write-in		18	0.01	▲0.01
Total votes		152,987	100.00	

=== Results ===
1848 United States presidential election in Indiana
Party	Candidate	Votes
Democratic	Nathaniel Albertson	74,692
Democratic	Cyrus L. Dunham	74,692
Democratic	Graham N. Fitch	74,691
Democratic	Daniel Mace	74,691
Democratic	William McCarty	74,691
Democratic	James Ritchey	74,691
Democratic	Andrew J. Harlan	74,686
Democratic	George W. Carr	74,685
Democratic	Charles H. Test	74,685
Democratic	E. M. Chamberlain	74,680
Democratic	Robert Dale Owen	74,675
Democratic	James M. Hanna	73,912
Whig	Thomas D. Walpole	70,175
Whig	Milton Gregg	70,165
Whig	David P. Holloway	70,165
Whig	John S. Davis	70,164
Whig	Edward W. McGaughey	70,163
Whig	Lovell Rousseau	70,163
Whig	James F. Suit	70,162
Whig	Daniel D. Pratt	70,157
Whig	David Kilgore	70,151
Whig	Joseph G. Marshall	70,149
Whig	Godlove S. Orth	70,145
Whig	James E. Blythe	70,135
Free Soil	John R. Cravens (Note: Including alternate spellings.)	8,102
Free Soil	Milton Short	8,100
Free Soil	Ovid Butler	8,099
Free Soil	George W. Julian	8,099
Free Soil	Albert G. Coffin	8,098
Free Soil	Samuel A. Huff	8,098
Free Soil	Joseph L. Jernegan	8,097
Free Soil	Nathaniel Little	8,092
Free Soil	Henry Leavitt Ellsworth	8,090
Free Soil	John H. Bradley	8,088
Free Soil	Daniel Worth	7,195
Independent Democrat	Henry Secrest	771
Independent Free Soil	Lewis Beecher	449
Independent Free Soil	Joseph Morrow	419
Independent Whig	John Pitcher	76
Unpledged	A. Bassett	14
Unpledged	E. Beach	14
Unpledged	E. Beardsley	14
Unpledged	H. H. Beardsley	14
Unpledged	M. A. Brodrick	14
Unpledged	N. F. Brodrick	14
Unpledged	D. W. Gray	14
Unpledged	J. Frush	14
Unpledged	Joseph H. Leeper	14
Unpledged	W. H. Marvin	14
Unpledged	J. Primley	14
Unpledged	William Proctor	14
Unpledged	Samuel A. Taffee	6
Unpledged	A. C. Cooper	4
Unpledged	Samuel Ball	3
Unpledged	Stephen S. Harding	3
Unpledged	Jesse Lynch Holman	3
Unpledged	Roger Ide	3
Unpledged	Squire H. Knapp	3
Unpledged	John M. Patrick	3
Unpledged	Isaiah W. Robinson	3
Unpledged	Thomas Smith	3
Unpledged	George Walker	3
Unpledged	Jonas Walker	3
Unpledged	Richard Workman	3
Unpledged	James L. Yater	3
Unpledged	George B. Arnold	1
Unpledged	Jonathan Blanchard	1
Unpledged	John Bufferm	1
Unpledged	Samuel H. Davis	1
Unpledged	Henry B. Evans	1
Unpledged	Thomas Hogue	1
Unpledged	A. Hose	1
Unpledged	William B. Ogdon	1
Unpledged	Benjamin Dwight Sheldon	1
Unpledged	Levi F. Torrey	1
Total		≈152,987

== See also ==
- United States presidential elections in Indiana

== Bibliography ==
- "1848 Electoral College Results". National Archives.
- Lampi, Philip J. (n.d.). "Electoral College". A New Nation Votes. American Antiquarian Society.
- Madison, James H. (1986). The Indiana Way: A State History. Bloomington: Indiana University Press.
- Ratcliffe, Donald J. (Spring 2014). "Popular Preferences in the Presidential Election of 1824". Journal of the Early Republic. 34 (1): 45–77. JSTOR 24486931.
- Riker, Dorothy; Thornbrough, Gayle, eds. (1960). Indiana Election Returns, 1816–1851. Indianapolis: Indiana Historical Bureau.
