= Svend Petersen =

American political scientist (1911–1992)

Svend Petersen (March 13, 1911 – January 18, 1992) was a Danish-born author, political researcher and analyst, Trans-O-Gram puzzle creator, one of the four founding officers of The Red Circle of Washington, D.C., and a member of The Baker Street Irregulars.

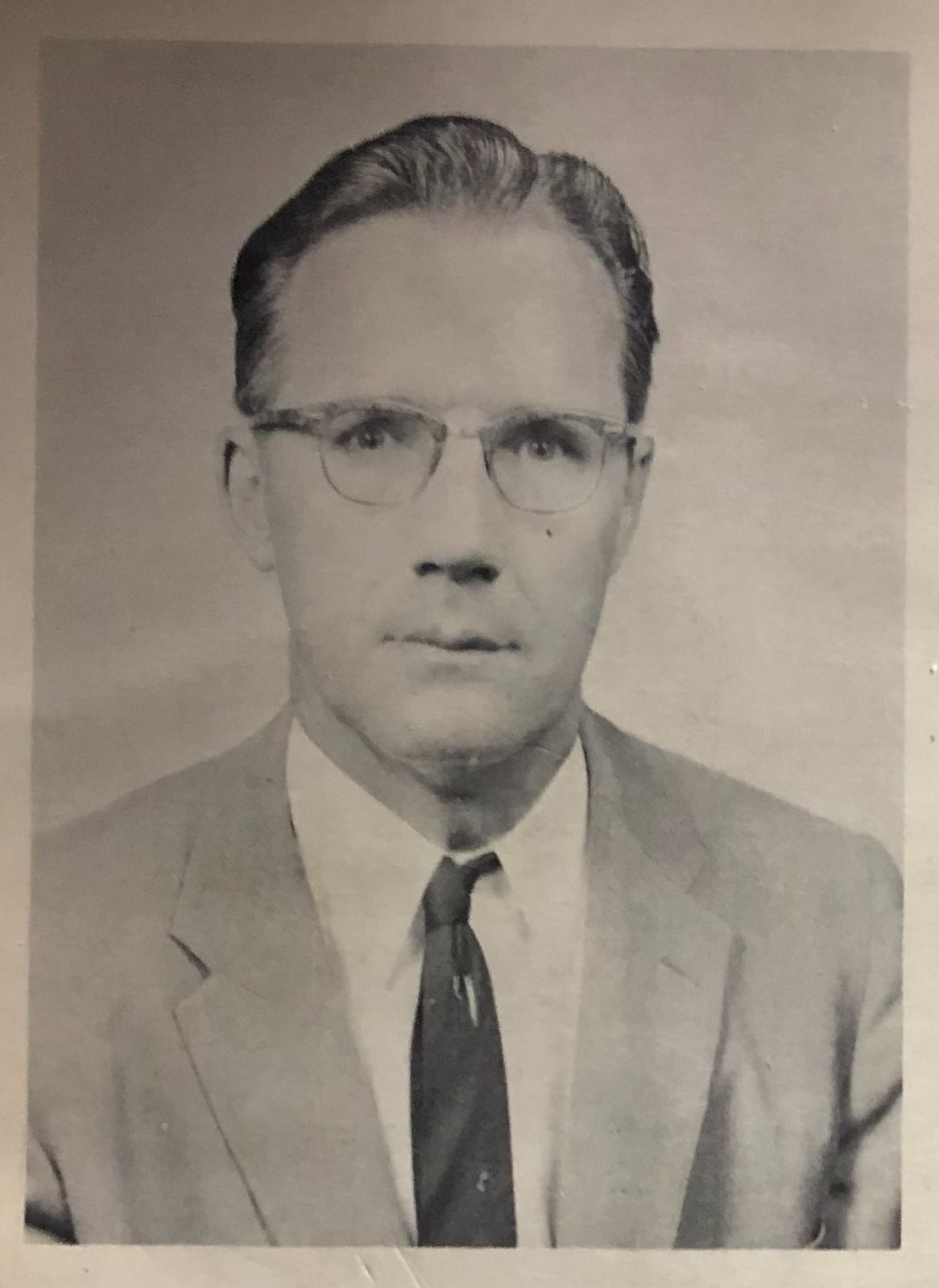
Picture of Svend Petersen

== Early life and career ==
Svend was born on March 13, 1911, in Kolding, Denmark, the son of Karen Elizabeth and Alarius Peter Vilhelm Petersen. At 10 months of age, his parents immigrated with him to the United States, arriving at Ellis Island April 20, 1912, on board the RMS Celtic (1901).

Little is known about his early life until about 1920 where the US Federal Census finds him living in Salem, Kenosha, Wisconsin with his mother, sister, brother and Uncle. His father is believed to have died a year earlier. In 1925 the Iowa State Census finds him living Newell, Buena Vista, Iowa with his sister Helen. The whereabouts of his mother are unknown at this point. The 1930 US Federal Census finds him renting a room in Newell, Buena Vista, Iowa.

From late 1950 through the 1970s Svend worked in a political research capacity for several Republican congressmen.

== Published books ==
- The testamentary capacity of Sherlock Holmes; Parallel case; The unwritten canon lore, 1953
- I claim urgency!, 1953
- A statistical history of our Presidential elections, 1955
- A Sherlock Holmes Almanac, 1956
- Mark Twain & the Government, 1960
- House of Representatives voting records for 1959, 1960
- House of Representatives voting records for 1960, 1960
- A Statistical History of the American Presidential Elections, 1963
- The Gettysburg Addresses The Story of Two Orations, 1963
- A Statistical History of the American Presidential Elections., 1968
- Trans-o-grams: Fifty brand new, hitherto unpublished puzzles, containing quotes of historical, political and Biblical interest, interspersed with poetical wit and humor, 1973
- A Statistical History of the American Presidential Elections: With Supplementary Tables Covering 1968-1980, 1981

== Other published works ==
- The Little Rock against the Big Rock, 1943
- Arkansas' Favorite Son, 1944
- Arkansas State Tuberculosis Sanatorium: The Nation's Largest, 1946
- Arkansas in Presidential Elections, 1963
- President Carter and the Honeymooners, National Review, 1977

== Family and death ==
On September 4, 1937, Svend married Mary Agnes Ates. Mary is the niece of Roscoe Blevel Ates. Svend and Mary produced three children – two boys and one girl.

Svend died on January 18, 1992, of natural causes in Seminole, Florida.

== Historical importance ==
While Svend never played a 'front stage' role in American Politics, his dedication to research helped public officials clearly articulate issues affecting the United States. His writings are frequently referenced by political pundits, college students writing papers and researches seeking statistical clarity on our political history. He was a man with merely a high school education but a superior intellect and a strong desire to help his country succeed.
