= Presidential Ballots, 1836–1892 =

Book by Walter Dean Burnham

- Author: Walter Dean Burnham
- Language: English
- Publisher: Johns Hopkins University Press, Arno Press
- Publication date: 1955
- Publication place: United States
- Media type: Print
- Pages: 956
- ISBN: 978-0-405-07678-7 (1976 republication)
- OCLC: 1087220136

Presidential Ballots, 1836–1892 is a non-fiction book containing detailed results of the United States presidential elections between the years of 1836 and 1892. Written by Walter Dean Burnham, it was published in 1955 by the Johns Hopkins University Press.

== Contents ==
Presidential Ballots, 1836–1892 contains an introduction and analysis of past trends in presidential elections, followed by hundreds of pages of tables of results by county for each presidential election between 1836 and 1892 in each state. The book also includes an appendix with notes on the book's sources, as well as documenting where accurate results could not be found.

== Background and publication ==
Presidential Ballots, 1836–1892 expands on The Presidential Vote, 1896–1932, a 1934 book by Stanford University professor Edgar E. Robinson, by collecting results of elections even further in the past.

The book was originally published by Johns Hopkins University Press in 1955. The book was republished by Arno Press in 1976.

== Reception ==
The book was met with a generally positive reception in academic press. It received a review in the Pennsylvania Magazine of History and Biography by Richard P. McCormick, who praised the effort put into collecting the data, as well as the book's informative introduction, which provides an overview of the nation's politics in the book's time period. McCormick finished his review writing that "Burnham's book should stimulate a host of studies in the little-explored field of American political behavior".

The book also received a review in The Journal of Southern History by Vincent P. De Santis, who wrote that the book would be an indispensable resource for students and historians studying American politics. De Santis provided a mild criticism of the book, saying that it was unfortunate that a more thorough analysis of the data was not provided and that the little analysis provided in the book was largely superficial. De Santis finishes by writing that he expects the book will be useful for more in-depth analysis of 19th-century presidential elections by future historians.

A review in The Journal of Politics by Frederic D. Ogden notes that the book, in addition to raw data, contained "seven chapters of text to clarify and give some generalized coherence to the data", which makes the data's use in future analyses clear. Ogden criticizes the book's lack of maps to give a visual representation of the data presented. Ogden also notes a few typographical errors in the book's prose and raises the concern that similar errors may have led to some errant data. He finishes his review by writing that his concerns are "relatively minor" and that the book is valuable for scholars interested in history and politics.
