= Walter Dean Burnham =

American political scientist (1930–2022)

- Born: June 15, 1930; Columbus, Ohio, U.S.
- Died: October 4, 2022 (aged 92); San Antonio, Texas, U.S.
- Education: Johns Hopkins University; Harvard University
- Employer(s): Massachusetts Institute of Technology; Washington University in St. Louis; University of Texas at Austin

Walter Dean Burnham (June 15, 1930 – October 4, 2022) was an American political scientist who was an expert on elections and voting patterns. He was known for his quantitative analysis of national trends and patterns in voting behavior, the development of the "Party Systems" model, and the assembling of county election returns for the entire country.

== Career ==
Burnham was born in 1930 in Columbus, Ohio. In 1951, Burnham received his AB from Johns Hopkins University in Baltimore, Maryland. He was awarded his Ph.D. in 1963 by Harvard University, where he worked with political scientist V.O. Key, Jr. Prior to moving to Texas in 1988, he taught at the Massachusetts Institute of Technology and Washington University in St. Louis. Burnham was elected to the American Academy of Arts and Sciences, and served as president of the Politics and History Section of the American Political Science Association. Burnham retired in 2003 and was professor emeritus of government at the University of Texas at Austin, where he held the Frank Erwin Centennial Chair in Government, named for a former long-term University of Texas regent.

Burnham was a specialist in election returns, and the sources of data for the ICPSR. He interpreted data in terms of statistical patterns and trends. He was primarily involved in American election data from 1824 to 1960. He died at the age of 92 in 2022.

== The Alabama U.S. Senate race of 1962 ==
In 1964, Burnham published an article on the 1962 U.S. Senate election in Alabama, when Republicans made their first strong showing for federal office since Reconstruction in the state known as "The Heart of Dixie." The Republican James D. Martin of Gadsden, an oil products distributor, challenged veteran Democrat J. Lister Hill of Montgomery and fell only a few thousand votes short of victory. Burnham describes the Martin campaign as an aberration from the customary issueless, personalist southern primary elections. Martin's campaign was a pacesetter for subsequent southern elections in that it was waged over national issues—mobilizing the white backlash against civil rights; stressing what he saw as "free enterprise," "local control," and "individual freedom"; decrying federal spending programs; shifting emphasis from opposition to desegregation to the preservation of "states rights." Burnham found it ironic that a Republican from the populist North Alabama ran strongly in the cities and Black Belt, while the Democratic senator from the capital city of Montgomery appealed to the northern hill country, where voters appreciated programs like the Tennessee Valley Authority and were less racially conscious because of the relatively small number of African Americans in their region. Martin fared best in those counties with non-voting blacks, prior to passage of the Voting Rights Act of 1965. All but one of the fifteen counties which showed a decline in the Republican vote between 1960 and 1962 were in the Appalachian section of North Alabama. Martin's showing along the Gulf Coast and the Florida Panhandle was paradoxical because southeast Alabama had been traditionally the most populist since the 1890s. Two years after the Hill-Martin race, Burnham correctly forecast that the inroads of presidential Republicanism would continue in the South, but competition at the state and local levels would take root slowly.

== Critical Elections ==
Burnham's 1970 book Critical Elections and the Mainsprings of American Politics presented a theory of American political development that focused on the role of party systems that endure for several decades, only to be disrupted by a critical election. Such elections not only hand presidential and congressional power to the non-incumbent political party, but they do so in a dramatic way that repudiates the worn-out ideas of the old party and initiates a new era whose leaders govern on a new set of assumptions, ideologies, and public policies. The frequency of its citation in the footnotes of other works indicates that Burnham's article "The Changing Shape of the American Political Universe" (1965) was highly influential. The majority of citations focus on the themes of voter turnout decline, realignment in 1896, and explanations for voter decline. The theory of elite, capitalist control of the political system in the 20th century has gained less attention and support.

== Major publications ==
- Presidential Ballots, 1836–1892 (1955) annotated compilation of county election results
- "Political immunization and political confessionalism: the United States and Weimar Germany." Journal of Interdisciplinary History 3.1 (1972): 1-30 online.
- "Theory and voting research: some reflections on Converse's “Change in the American Electorate”." American Political Science Review 68.3 (1974): 1002-1023.
- "The Changing Shape of the American Political Universe" American Political Science Review 59.1 (1965): 7-28. in JSTOR
- The American party systems: Stages of political development edited by William Nisbet Chambers and Burnham (1975)
  - "American politics in the 1970s: Beyond party." in The American Party Systems (1975) pp: 308-357.
- "Insulation and responsiveness in congressional elections." Political Science Quarterly 90.3 (1975): 411-435.
- Critical Elections and the Mainsprings of American Politics (1970) (summary)
- Politics/America: The Cutting Edge of Change (1972)
- The Current Crisis in American Politics (1982)
- The Evolution of American Electoral Systems (Contributions in American History) with Paul Kleppner, et al. (1981)
- with Richard Rose. "The appearance and disappearance of the American voter." in The political economy (1984) pp: 112-39.
- Democracy in the Making: American Government and Politics (1986), textbook
- "Constitutional Moments and Punctuated Equilibria" Yale Law Journal 108.8 (June 1999) 2237-2277.
- Voting in American Elections with Thomas Ferguson and Louis Ferleger (2009)

=== Video by Burnham ===
- Burnham, Walter Dean. "Critical Realignments Revisited." April 5, 2006 video recording of Burnham retrospective on critical realignments
