= Voter rolloff =

Ballot with too few choices selected

Voter drop-off, roll-off, or undervoting occurs when a voter selects fewer options in a contest than the maximum number allowed or makes no selection at all for a particular election. Undervotes may be intentional or unintentional.

Intentional undervotes arise from deliberate abstention. An individual may participate in the election but decline to support any candidate as a form of protest, or may simply choose not to vote for lower offices because they lack information or interest in downballot races. For example, a voter might select a presidential candidate but abstain from a concurrent county commissioner election.

Unintentional undervotes may result from poor ballot design or voter misunderstanding. For instance, a voter mistakenly marking a preference ballot by selecting the same candidate for multiple positions could lead to an undervote.

Undervotes, together with overvotes (where a voter selects more options than are allowed), are collectively referred to as residual votes. These are used in academic studies to assess the accuracy and reliability of voting systems in capturing voter intent.
