= 1822 Indiana's at-large congressional district special election =

- August 5, 1822
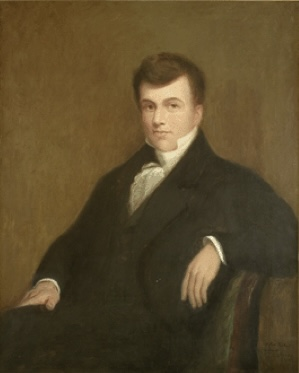

Nominee	Jonathan Jennings	Davis Floyd
Popular vote	13,531	5,971
Percentage	69.32%	30.59%
- County results Jennings: 50–60% 60–70% 70–80% 80–90% >90% Floyd: 50–60% 60–70% 70–80% 80–90% No data Non-voting area
U.S. representative before election
Vacant
Elected U.S. representative
Jonathan Jennings

A special election in Indiana's at-large congressional district took place on August 5, 1822. Governor Jonathan Jennings defeated judge Davis Floyd to represent Indiana for the remainder of the 17th United States Congress.

William Hendricks won the 1820 election for this seat, but resigned in May 1822 to run for governor of Indiana in the 1822 Indiana gubernatorial election. Jennings was popular following his tenure as governor and entered the race at the behest of his supporters. On Election Day, Jennings defeated Floyd by a greater than two-to-one margin.

Political parties did not play an important role in Indiana congressional elections during the 1820s. Both Floyd and Jennings belonged to the eastern, antislavery Political faction that came to power after 1809.

== Candidates ==
=== Jennings ===
Jennings was born in Hunterdon County, New Jersey, in 1794 and read law in Washington, Pennsylvania. He moved to Indiana Territory in 1807, where he worked as an attorney at law. Jennings settled first in Vincennes, Indiana, where he briefly served as clerk of the territorial legislature, but left the capital sometime after 1808. He settled next in Corydon, Indiana, where he emerged as a leader in the eastern, antislavery faction in territorial politics. Jennings's victory in the 1809 United States House of Representatives election in Indiana Territory signaled the rise of the antislavery movement in Indiana and the decline of the formerly-dominant proslavery faction.

Jennings presided over the Indiana constitutional convention in 1816 and was elected governor later that year. As governor, Jennings negotiated the Treaty of St. Mary's and supported legislation to penalize kidnapping free people of color by slavecatchers. He resisted calls to increase taxes to address the state budget deficit, relying on issuing treasury notes and projected future revenues from the settlement of new lands to reduce the deficit over time.

=== Floyd ===
Floyd was in Indiana Territory as early as 1801, when he opened a tavern at Clarksville, Indiana. He later moved to Corydon, Indiana, and represented Clark County in the territorial legislature in 1805. He was implicated in the Burr conspiracy, but received only a light sentence, and was subsequently elected clerk of the Indiana House of Representatives. He was a delegate to the Indiana constitutional convention from Harrison County, Indiana, and served as presiding judge of one of the Indiana circuit courts from 1816 to 1823.

An opponent of slavery, Floyd belonged to the antislavery faction in the Indiana Territory. He served as secretary of a Clark County convention that petitioned Congress to uphold the ban on slavery in Indiana in 1807. Following statehood, Floyd's antislavery judicial record earned him the nickname "the great emancipator." His attempts to secure the extradition of a Kentucky resident for the 1818 kidnapping of a freedom seeker living in Indiana brought him into conflict with the Kentucky General Assembly and the proslavery sheriff of Harrison County, Indiana, John Tipton.

== General election ==
=== Campaign ===
Floyd was the first to announce his candidacy. Jennings entered the race several weeks later at the behest of his supporters in different parts of the state. The special election took place concurrently with regular elections for the 18th United States Congress, in which Jennings was a candidate to represent Indiana's newly-created 2nd congressional district. Floyd campaigned on his record and long residence in the state. Jennings's opponents distributed handbills attacking his official conduct, but these efforts did little to damage the governor's popularity.

=== Results ===
1822 Indiana's at-large congressional district special election
Party	Candidate	Votes	%
Nonpartisan	Jonathan Jennings	13,531	69.32
Nonpartisan	Davis Floyd	5,971	30.59
Nonpartisan	James Scott	16	0.08
Nonpartisan	Henry P. Thornton	1	0.00
Total votes		19,519	100.00

==== Results by county ====
County	Jonathan Jennings		Davis Floyd		Others		Margin		Total
County	Votes	%	Votes	%	Votes	%	Votes	%	Total
Bartholomew	**		**		**		**		—
Clark	800	74.63	267	24.91	5	0.47	533	49.72	1,072
Crawford	185	69.29	82	30.71	—		103	38.58	267
Daviess	268	61.05	171	38.95	—		97	22.10	439
Dearborn	1,006	63.83	570	36.17	—		436	27.66	1,576
Decatur	104	73.24	38	26.76	—		66	46.48	142
Dubois	121	79.60	31	20.39	—		90	59.21	152
Fayette	558	78.92	149	21.07	—		409	57.85	707
Floyd	321	89.66	37	10.34	—		284	79.33	358
Franklin	789	69.27	350	30.73	—		439	38.54	1,139
Gibson	57	14.21	344	85.78	—		-287	-71.57	401
Greene	75	51.72	70	48.28	—		5	3.45	145
Harrison	724	65.46	382	34.54	—		342	30.92	1,106
Henry	34	34.34	65	65.66	—		-31	-31.31	99
Jackson	460	80.56	111	19.44	—		349	61.12	571
Jefferson	392	34.66	739	65.34	—		-347	-30.68	1,131
Jennings	351	93.85	23	6.15	—		328	87.70	374
Knox	158	25.82	454	74.18	—		-296	-48.37	612
Lawrence	384	90.14	42	9.86	—		342	80.28	426
Marion	282	92.46	15	4.92	8	2.62	267	87.54	305
Martin	177	93.16	13	6.84	—		164	86.32	190
Monroe	296	71.67	117	28.33	—		179	43.34	413
Morgan	125	86.11	16	11.11	3	2.08	109	75.69	144
Orange	422	81.62	95	18.38	—		327	63.25	517
Owen	61	47.29	68	52.71	—		-7	-5.43	129
Parke	225	100.00	—		—		225	100.00	225
Perry	160	77.67	46	22.33	—		114	55.37	206
Pike	148	83.62	29	16.38	—		119	67.23	177
Posey	307	69.77	133	30.23	—		174	39.54	440
Putnam	81	81.00	19	19.00	—		62	62.00	100
Randolph	107	99.07	—		1	0.92	106	98.15	108
Ripley	335	90.54	35	9.46	—		300	81.08	370
Rush	**		**		**		**		**
Scott	204	54.99	167	45.01	—		37	9.97	371
Shelby	192	87.27	28	12.73	—		164	74.54	220
Spencer	180	78.60	49	21.40	—		131	57.20	229
Sullivan	288	80.22	71	19.78	—		217	60.44	359
Switzerland	566	83.98	108	16.02	—		458	67.95	674
Union	286	63.98	161	36.02	—		127	28.41	447
Vanderburgh	117	49.37	120	50.63	—		-3	-1.26	237
Vigo	412	98.56	6	1.44	—		406	97.13	418
Warrick	226	89.68	26	10.32	—		200	79.36	252
Washington	824	74.10	288	25.90	—		536	48.20	1,112
Wayne	724	63.01	425	36.99	—		299	26.02	1,149
TOTAL	13,531	69.32	5,971	30.59	17	0.09	7,560	39.19	19,519

== See also ==
- List of special elections to the United States House of Representatives

== Bibliography ==
- Carmony, Donald Francis (1998). Indiana 1816-1850: the Pioneer Era. Indianapolis: Indiana Historical Society. ISBN 0-87195-125-8.
- Cayton, Andrew L. (1996). Frontier Indiana. Bloomington: Indiana University Press.
- Esarey, Logan, ed. (1922). Messages and Letters of William Henry Harrison. Vol. 1: 1800–1811. Indianapolis: Indiana Historical Commission.
- Lampi, Philip J. (2012). "Indiana 1822 U.S. House of Representatives, Special". A New Nation Votes. American Antiquarian Society.
- Riker, Dorothy; Thornbrough, Gayle (1960). Indiana Election Returns: 1816-1851. Indianapolis: Indiana Historical Bureau.
- Riker, Dorothy; Barnhart, John D. (1994). Indiana to 1816: The Colonial Period. Indianapolis: Indiana Historical Society.
- Riker, Dorothy (December 1932). "Jonathan Jennings". Indiana Magazine of History. 28 (4): 223–239.
- Salafia, Matthew (2013). Slavery's Borderland: Slavery and Bondage Along the Ohio River. Philadelphia: University of Pennsylvania Press.
