= 1818 United States House of Representatives election in Indiana =

1818 United States House of Representatives election in Indiana's at-large congressional district
- August 3, 1818
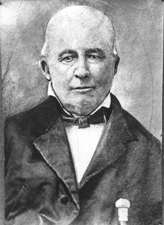

Nominee	William Hendricks	Reuben W. Nelson
Popular vote	10,646	1,122
Percentage	90.45%	9.53%
- County results Hendricks: 60–70% 80–90% >90% Nelson: 60–70% >90% No data Non-voting area
U.S. representative before election
William Hendricks
Elected U.S. representative
William Hendricks

The 1818 United States House of Representatives election in Indiana took place on August 3, 1818. Incumbent U.S. representative William Hendricks defeated Reuben W. Nelson to represent Indiana's at-large congressional district in the 16th United States Congress.

Political parties did not play an important role in Indiana congressional elections before the 1830s. Hendricks, an independent politician, was a prominent member of the eastern, antislavery Political faction that dominated Indiana politics during the first decade following statehood. Hendricks faced minimal opposition in his bid for a third term in Congress. The incumbent was enormously popular across the state, with only a few pockets of resistance. On Election Day, Hendricks lost only two counties in southwestern Indiana, while Nelson received no votes in three counties.

== Candidates ==
=== Hendricks ===
Hendricks was born in Westmoreland County, Pennsylvania, in 1782 and graduated from Jefferson College. He left Pennsylvania after 1810, migrating first to Cincinnati and then to Madison, Indiana, where he worked as an attorney at law. He became involved in territorial politics, winning election to the legislature from Jefferson County, Indiana, in 1813. Between 1813 and 1816 he held several appointive positions, including that of territorial printer, prosecutor, and United States Attorney. He served as speaker of the territorial House of Representatives and as secretary of the Indiana constitutional convention in 1816, despite not being a delegate.

Hendricks was one of the leaders of the eastern faction during the territorial period, which lobbied successfully for the abolition of slavery in Indiana. He was elected to Congress in 1816 and re-elected the following year, both times defeating candidates from the western, proslavery faction. In Congress, Hendricks opposed the admission of Missouri as a slave state during the Missouri Crisis and represented militiamen seeking payment for their service during the War of 1812. Charges that Hendricks neglected the veterans' case was the subject of controversy during the previous campaign.

=== Nelson ===
Nelson was born in Duchess County, New York, in 1777. He moved to the Indiana Territory in around the year 1810 and became a prominent attorney and Mason in Jeffersonville, Indiana. As editor of the Corydon Indiana Herald, Nelson was critical of Hendricks and the eastern faction. He ran against Hendricks in 1817, but withdrew and endorsed Thomas Posey shortly before the election.

== General election ==
=== Results ===
1818 Indiana's at-large congressional district
Party	Candidate	Votes	%	±%
Nonpartisan	William Hendricks (incumbent)	10,646	90.45	▲30.35
Nonpartisan	Reuben W. Nelson	1,122	9.53	N/A
Nonpartisan	Waller Taylor	1	0.01	N/A
Nonpartisan	R. W. Noble	1	0.01	N/A
Total votes		11,770	100.00	

==== Results by county ====
County	William Hendricks		Reuben W. Nelson		Others		Margin		Total
County	Votes	%	Votes	%	Votes	%	Votes	%	Total
Clark	1,122	96.56	40	3.44	—		1,082	93.11	1,162
Crawford	**		**		**		**		**
Daviess	328	100.00	—		—		328	100.00	328
Dearborn	903	97.10	27	2.90	—		876	94.19	930
Dubois	68	100.00	—		—		68	100.00	68
Franklin	1,389	99.64	5	0.36	—		1,384	99.28	1,394
Gibson	163	90.06	18	9.94	—		145	80.11	181
Harrison	664	62.52	398	37.48	—		266	25.05	1,062
Jackson	285	95.64	13	4.36	—		272	91.28	298
Jefferson	741	96.61	26	3.39	—		715	93.22	767
Jennings	121	99.18	1	0.82	—		120	98.36	122
Knox	179	34.29	343	65.71	2	0.38	-164	-31.42	522
Lawrence	151	99.34	1	0.66	—		150	98.68	152
Monroe	132	86.84	20	13.16	—		112	73.68	152
Orange	492	99.80	1	0.20	—		491	99.60	493
Perry	180	87.38	26	12.62	—		154	74.76	206
Pike	79	63.20	46	36.80	—		33	26.40	125
Posey	284	89.87	26	8.23	—		258	81.64	316
Ripley	72	100.00	—		—		72	100.00	72
Spencer	**		**		**		**		**
Sullivan	363	98.91	4	1.09	—		359	97.82	367
Switzerland	394	98.50	6	1.50	—		388	97.00	400
Vanderburgh	75	92.59	6	7.41	—		69	85.18	81
Vigo	169	98.83	2	1.17	—		167	97.66	171
Warrick	6	6.12	92	93.88	—		-86	-87.76	98
Washington	878	97.77	20	2.23	—		858	95.54	898
Wayne	1,408	99.93	1	0.07	—		1,407	99.86	1,409
TOTAL	10,646	90.45	1,122	9.53	2	0.02	9,524	80.92	11,770

== Bibliography ==
- Blackburn, Glen A.; Robertson, Nellie Armstrong; Riker, Dorothy, eds. (1942). The John Tipton Papers. Vol. 1: 1809–1827. Indianapolis: Indiana Historical Bureau.
- Carmony, Donald Francis (1998). Indiana 1816-1850: the Pioneer Era. Indianapolis: Indiana Historical Society. ISBN 0-87195-125-8.
- Cayton, Andrew L. (1996). Frontier Indiana. Bloomington: Indiana University Press.
- Hill, Frederick D. (December 1974). "William Hendricks' Political Circulars to his Constituents: Congressional Period, 1816-1822". Indiana Magazine of History. 70 (4): 296–344. JSTOR 27789995.
- Lampi, Philip J. (2012). "Indiana 1818 U.S. House of Representatives". A New Nation Votes. American Antiquarian Society.
- Riker, Dorothy; Thornbrough, Gayle (1960). Indiana Election Returns: 1816-1851. Indianapolis: Indiana Historical Bureau.
- Salafia, Matthew (2013). Slavery's Borderland: Slavery and Bondage Along the Ohio River. Philadelphia: University of Pennsylvania Press.
