= 1816 United States House of Representatives election in Indiana =

1816 United States House of Representatives election in Indiana's at-large congressional district
- August 5, 1816
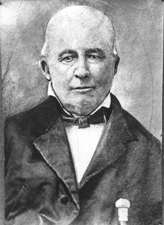

Nominee	William Hendricks	Allen D. Thom
Popular vote	5,160	1,269
Percentage	80.25%	19.74
- County results Hendricks: 60–70% 80–90% >90% Thom: 70–80% No data Non-voting area
U.S. representative before election
Jonathan Jennings (Note: Representing the Indiana Territory)
Elected U.S. representative
William Hendricks

The 1816 United States House of Representatives election in Indiana took place on August 5, 1816. William Hendricks defeated Allen D. Thom to represent Indiana's at-large congressional district in the 14th United States Congress.

The United States Congress passed enabling legislation permitting the Indiana Territory to write a constitution in 1816. Delegates to the constitutional convention met in Corydon, Indiana, from June 10 to June 29, after which the first state elections took place in August. Congress formally approved the Constitution of Indiana on December 11, nine days after Indiana's representative was seated by the United States House of Representatives.

The election was formally nonpartisan. Hendricks identified as an independent politician unaffiliated with either national political party. Locally, Hendricks belonged to the Political faction led by the outgoing U.S. territorial delegate, Jonathan Jennings. Michael J. Dubin classifies Hendricks as a Democratic-Republican during his congressional term.

== Candidates ==
Political parties did not play a significant role in Indiana congressional elections before the 1830s. Hendricks and Thom represented sectionally-oriented factions led by the incumbent delegate, Jennings, and the outgoing territorial governor, Thomas Posey. There were no formal nominations; Thom claimed to have been drafted by his supporters, while both leading candidates were pejoratively labeled "caucus" nominees, an allusion to the unpopular congressional nominating caucus.

=== Hendricks ===
Hendricks was born in Westmoreland County, Pennsylvania, in 1782 and graduated from Jefferson College. He left Pennsylvania after 1810, migrating first to Cincinnati and then to Madison, Indiana, where he worked as an attorney at law. He was elected to the territorial House of Representatives in 1813, serving until 1816. During this period he held numerous other positions in the territorial government, including that of territorial printer, prosecutor, U.S. attorney, and speaker of the House. His alliance with Jennings enabled him to be appointed secretary of the constitutional convention, despite not being a delegate. He was a prominent member of the dominant, Jennings-led faction, which supported the abolition of slavery, and drew support from the populous, eastern counties.

=== Thom ===
Thom was the U.S. collector of revenue at Jeffersonville, Indiana, and served as the last adjutant general of the Indiana Territory. He was a supporter of governor Thomas Posey, who succeeded William Henry Harrison as the leader of the proslavery, western faction in Indiana politics.

=== Sullivan ===
George R. C. Sullivan initially declared his candidacy, but withdrew in favor of Thom shortly before the election. An attorney and resident of Vincennes, Indiana, he received at least one vote in Orleans Township, Orange County, Indiana, despite no longer being a candidate.

== General election ==
=== Results ===
1816 Indiana's at-large congressional district
Party	Candidate	Votes	%
Nonpartisan	William Hendricks	5,160	80.25
Nonpartisan	Allen D. Thom	1,269	19.74
Nonpartisan	George R. C. Sullivan	1	0.00%
Total votes		6,430	100.00

==== Results by county ====
Returns from the majority of counties have been lost. Phil Lampi's A New Nation Votes project locates partial results from five counties based on unofficial returns published in the Vincennes Western Sun.

County	William Hendricks		Allen D. Thom		George R. C. Sullivan		Margin		Total
County	Votes	%	Votes	%	Votes	%	Votes	%	Total
Clark	**		**		**		**		**
Dearborn	**		**		**		**		**
Franklin	449	91.82	40	8.18	409	83.64	—		489
Gibson	**		**		**		**		**
Harrison	**		**		**		**		**
Jackson	93	69.40	41	30.60	—		52	38.80	134
Jefferson	**		**		**		**		**
Knox	170	23.84	543	76.16	—		-373	-52.31	713
Orange	191	66.32	96	33.33	1	0.35	95	32.99	288
Perry	**		**		**		**		**
Posey	**		**		**		**		**
Switzerland	**		**		**		**		**
Warrick	**		**		**		**		**
Washington	499	85.44	85	14.55	—		414	70.89	584
Wayne	**		**		**		**		**

== See also ==
- 1816 and 1817 United States House of Representatives elections
- 1817 United States House of Representatives election in Indiana
- List of United States representatives from Indiana

== Bibliography ==
- Brown, Demarchus C., ed. (1907). Legislative and State Manual of Indiana for 1907. Indianapolis: Indiana General Assembly.
- Carmony, Donald Francis (1998). Indiana 1816-1850: the Pioneer Era. Indianapolis: Indiana Historical Society. ISBN 0-87195-125-8.
- Cayton, Andrew L. (1996). Frontier Indiana. Bloomington: Indiana University Press.
- Dubin, Michael J. (March 1, 1998). United States Congressional Elections, 1788-1997: The Official Results of the Elections of the 1st Through 105th Congresses. McFarland and Company.
- Hill, Frederick D. (December 1974). "William Hendricks' Political Circulars to his Constituents: Congressional Period, 1816-1822". Indiana Magazine of History. 70 (4): 296–344. JSTOR 27789995.
- Lampi, Philip J. (2012). "Indiana 1816 U.S. House of Representatives". A New Nation Votes. American Antiquarian Society.
- Riker, Dorothy; Thornbrough, Gayle (1960). Indiana Election Returns: 1816-1851. Indianapolis: Indiana Historical Bureau.
- Salafia, Matthew (2013). Slavery's Borderland: Slavery and Bondage Along the Ohio River. Philadelphia: University of Pennsylvania Press.
