= 1822 Indiana gubernatorial election =

- August 5, 1822
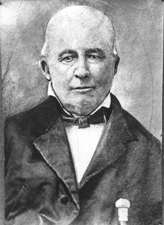
Nominee	William Hendricks
Popular vote	18,340
Percentage	100.00%
Governor before election
Jonathan Jennings
Elected Governor
William Hendricks

The 1822 Indiana gubernatorial election took place on August 5, 1822. The U.S. representative from Indiana's at-large congressional district William Hendricks was elected virtually without opposition. This was the only unanimous Indiana gubernatorial election and the last before the revival of party politics following the 1824 United States presidential election.

The incumbent governor of Indiana Jonathan Jennings was ineligible for re-election due to term limits established by the Constitution of Indiana. Although Hendricks never formally announced his candidacy, his name was before the public as early as March as an "authorized" candidate for governor. In May, he resigned his congressional seat, indicating his willingness to be elected governor. Hendricks was enormously personally popular, having faced only token opposition in his most recent bid for re-election. No rival candidate emerged to contest the election, and Hendricks was understood to be running unopposed.

The Democratic-Republican Party was dominant nationally during the Era of Good Feelings, and the politics of the state were conducted on a nonpartisan basis. The factionalism of the territorial period had all but subsided, and Hendricks drew support from every section of the state. Local meetings in support of Hendricks's candidacy were held in several places, and the candidate enjoyed the backing of most of the press. Hendricks was the overwhelming choice of the voters on Election Day; so unanimous was the verdict that the editor of the Vincennes Western Sun deemed it unnecessary to publish the official returns.

Following the election, Jennings resigned as governor in order to assume the congressional seat vacated by Hendricks, briefly elevating the lieutenant governor Ratliff Boon to the governorship.

== General election ==
=== Results ===
The original manuscript returns appear to be lost. The journal of the Indiana House of Representatives shows 18,340 votes for Hendricks and none for other candidates. Unofficial results published by the Indianapolis Gazette show two votes for other candidates Marion County. These are the only know votes cast against Hendricks in any county. The following table quotes the official figures reported by the speaker of the Indiana House of Representatives.

1822 Indiana gubernatorial election
Party	Candidate	Votes	%
Nonpartisan	William Hendricks	18,340	100.00%
Total votes		18,340	100.00%

=== Results by county ===
The summary of the election result in the Indiana House Journal omits the county-level data. As Hendricks's election was considered a foregone conclusion, contemporary editors considered it unnecessary to publish a detailed account of the vote in each county. Phil Lampi's A New Nation Votes project locates unofficial results from two counties, shown below. These are the only surviving county returns for this election.

County	William Hendricks		Others		Total
County	Votes	Percent	Votes	Percent	Total
Marion	315	99.37	2	0.63	317
Wayne	1,113	100.00	—		1,113

== Bibliography ==
- Carmony, Donald Francis (1998). Indiana 1816-1850: the Pioneer Era. Indianapolis: Indiana Historical Society. ISBN 0-87195-125-8.
- Hill, Frederick D. (December 1974). "William Hendricks' Political Circulars to his Constituents: Congressional Period, 1816-1822". Indiana Magazine of History. 70 (4): 296–344. JSTOR 27789995.
- Lampi, Philip (2012). "Indiana 1822 Governor". A New Nation Votes: American Election Returns 1787-1825. American Antiquarian Society.
- Riker, Dorothy; Thornbrough, Gayle (1960). Indiana Election Returns: 1816-1851. Indiana Historical Bureau.
- Riker, Dorothy (December 1932). "Jonathan Jennings". Indiana Magazine of History. 28 (4): 223–239. JSTOR 27786567.
