= William Hendricks (disambiguation) =

William Hendricks (1782–1850) was a member of the House of Representatives and the third Governor of Indiana.

William Hendricks may also refer to:

- William L. Hendricks (1904–1992), Toys for Tots founder and Looney Tunes producer
- William Hendricks Jr. (1809–1850), American politician
