= 1817 United States House of Representatives election in Indiana =

1817 United States House of Representatives election in Indiana's at-large congressional district
- August 4, 1817
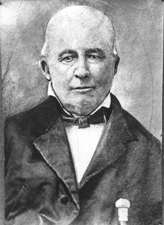

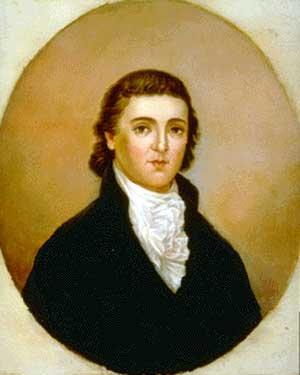
Nominee	William Hendricks	Thomas Posey
Popular vote	5,743	3,813
Percentage	60.10%	39.90%
- County results Hendricks: 50–60% 60–70% 80–90% >90% Posey: 50–60% 60–70% 70–80% >90% Tie Non-voting area
U.S. representative before election
William Hendricks
Elected U.S. representative
William Hendricks

The 1817 United States House of Representatives election in Indiana took place on August 4, 1817. Incumbent U.S. representative William Hendricks defeated former territorial governor Thomas Posey to represent Indiana's at-large congressional district in the 15th United States Congress.

Political parties played an unimportant role in Indiana congressional elections before the 1830s. Hendricks, an independent politician aligned with the eastern Political faction, was opposed by the western faction led by U.S. senator Waller Taylor. Hendricks initially faced the editor of the Corydon Indiana Herald, Reuben W. Nelson. Nelson's campaign floundered during the spring of 1817, and he withdrew in favor of Posey, who lost the election to Hendricks by a wide margin.

== Candidates ==
=== Hendricks ===
Hendricks was born in Westmoreland County, Pennsylvania, in 1782 and graduated from Jefferson College. He left Pennsylvania after 1810, migrating first to Cincinnati and then to Madison, Indiana, where he worked as an attorney at law. He became involved in territorial politics, winning election to the legislature from Jefferson County, Indiana, in 1813. Between 1813 and 1816 he held several appointive positions, including that of territorial printer, prosecutor, and United States Attorney. He served as speaker of the territorial House of Representatives and as secretary of the Indiana constitutional convention in 1816, despite not being a delegate.

Hendricks was one of the leaders of the eastern Political faction during the territorial period, which lobbied successfully for the abolition of slavery in Indiana. His alliance with the antislavery leader, Jonathan Jennings, helped him to win the first election for the state's at-large congressional district in 1816.

=== Nelson ===
Reuben W. Nelson was born in Duchess County, New York, in 1777. He moved to the Indiana Territory in around the year 1810, and became a prominent attorney and Mason in Jeffersonville, Indiana, and editor of the Corydon Indiana Herald. Nelson initially challenged Hendricks in the spring of 1817, but withdrew shortly before the election.

=== Posey ===
Posey was born in Fairfax County, Virginia, in 1750. He served as a captain in the Continental Army during the American Revolutionary War. In 1793, he accepted a brigadier general's commission and served in the Northwest Indian War. He was a delegate to the Virginia Ratifying Convention and voted to ratify the Constitution of the United States. A member of the Federalist Party, he and ran unsuccessfully for the U.S. House of Representatives in 1797. After his defeat, Posey moved with his family to Henderson County, Kentucky, where he worked as an attorney. He moved again to Jeffersonville, Indiana, in 1813, following his appointment to succeed the retiring territorial governor, William Henry Harrison.

Posey petitioned the United States Congress to repeal the Northwest Ordinance's ban on slavery in the Northwest Territory as early as 1799. As governor, Posey succeeded Harrison as the leader of the proslavery political faction in Indiana. Recognizing the rising opposition to slavery in the territory, Posey stated privately that he would oppose new proslavery legislation, but remained closely associated with proslavery leaders in Southwestern Indiana. He lost the 1816 Indiana gubernatorial election to Jennings, whose victory confirmed the antislavery faction as the dominant force in Indiana politics.

== General election ==
=== Campaign ===
Nelson announced his candidacy in the spring of 1817. He received the vocal backing of the proslavery press, but his campaign failed to gain a significant popular following. Nelson ultimately withdrew from the race and endorsed Posey in the month before the election. The Vincennes, Indiana Western Sun praised Posey's military record in contrast to Hendricks, whom they accused of shortchanging veterans of the War of 1812. The Sun's correspondents charged that Hendricks and the other leaders of the antislavery faction were "without either public or individual merit" and deserved to be "discarded as unworthy servants." Posey's failing health and Federalist political leanings, however, undermined the former governor's campaign.

Hendricks did not respond to his opponents' attacks until after the election. Friendly coverage from the Corydon Indiana Gazette and the Madison Indiana Republican countered the hostile editorial stance of the Indiana Herald and the Western Sun. Privately, Hendricks expressed concern about the possibility of a strong re-election challenge and wrote to his allies in Indiana seeking information about his rivals' political activities. Such fears were apparently misplaced, for Hendricks defeated Posey by a wider margin than Jennings in 1816.

=== Results ===
1817 Indiana's at-large congressional district
Party	Candidate	Votes	%	±%
Nonpartisan	William Hendricks (incumbent)	5,743	60.10	▼20.15
Nonpartisan	Thomas Posey	3,813	39.90	N/A
Total votes		9,556	100.00	

==== Results by county ====
County	William Hendricks		Thomas Posey		Margin		Total
County	Votes	%	Votes	%	Votes	%	Total
Clark	467	55.93	368	44.07	99	11.86	835
Daviess	135	45.00	165	55.00	-30	-10.00	300
Dearborn	365	63.70	208	36.30	157	27.40	573
Franklin	1,019	95.50	48	4.50	971	91.00	1,067
Gibson	116	39.06	181	60.94	-65	-21.88	297
Harrison	457	51.52	430	48.48	27	3.04	887
Jackson	192	86.49	30	13.51	162	72.97	222
Jefferson	453	61.80	280	38.20	173	23.60	733
Jennings	80	81.63	18	18.37	62	63.26	98
Ripley	80	81.63	18	18.37	62	63.26	98
Knox	35	9.19	346	90.81	-311	-81.63	381
Orange	482	69.65	210	30.35	272	39.31	692
Perry	56	26.92	152	73.08	-96	-46.15	208
Pike	71	50.00	71	50.00	0	0.00	142
Posey	121	21.08	453	78.92	-332	-21.08	574
Sullivan	128	45.22	155	54.77	-27	-9.54	283
Switzerland	222	63.79	126	36.21	96	27.59	348
Warrick	—		195	100.00	-195	-100.00	195
Washington	383	61.28	242	38.72	141	22.56	625
Wayne	961	87.68	135	12.32	826	75.36	1,096
TOTAL	5,743	60.10	3,813	39.90	1,930	20.20	9,556

== Bibliography ==
- Blackburn, Glen A.; Robertson, Nellie Armstrong; Riker, Dorothy, eds. (1942). The John Tipton Papers. Vol. 1: 1809–1827. Indianapolis: Indiana Historical Bureau.
- Carmony, Donald Francis (1998). Indiana 1816-1850: the Pioneer Era. Indianapolis: Indiana Historical Society. ISBN 0-87195-125-8.
- Cayton, Andrew L. (1996). Frontier Indiana. Bloomington: Indiana University Press.
- Hill, Frederick D. (December 1974). "William Hendricks' Political Circulars to his Constituents: Congressional Period, 1816-1822". Indiana Magazine of History. 70 (4): 296–344. JSTOR 27789995.
- Lampi, Philip J. (2012). "Indiana 1817 U.S. House of Representatives". A New Nation Votes. American Antiquarian Society.
- Posey, John Thornton (Winter 1990). "A Federalist on the Frontier: General Thomas Posey". Illinois Historical Journal. 83 (4): 247–58. JSTOR 40192323.
- Riker, Dorothy; Thornbrough, Gayle (1960). Indiana Election Returns: 1816-1851. Indianapolis: Indiana Historical Bureau.
- Salafia, Matthew (2013). Slavery's Borderland: Slavery and Bondage Along the Ohio River. Philadelphia: University of Pennsylvania Press.
