= 1819 Indiana gubernatorial election =

- August 2, 1819
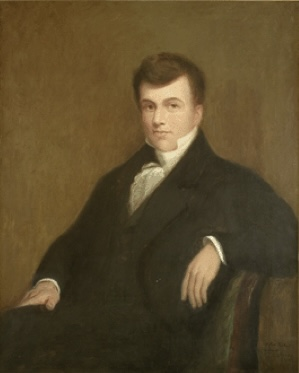

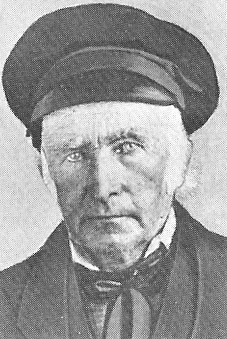
Nominee	Jonathan Jennings	Christopher Harrison
Popular vote	9,287	2,997
Percentage	75.11%	24.24%
- County results Jennings: 60–70% 70–80% 80–90% >90% Harrison: 60–70% 70–80% 80–90% No data Non-voting area
Governor before election
Jonathan Jennings
Elected Governor
Jonathan Jennings

The 1819 Indiana gubernatorial election took place August 2, 1819. The incumbent governor Jonathan Jennings defeated the former lieutenant governor Christopher Harrison.

Jennings announced his candidacy in May, following weeks of speculation. For some time the identity of his opponent remained uncertain. Harrison entered the race on July 3 and quickly emerged as the main challenger to the incumbent. Other possible candidates, including the judge of the Indiana Supreme Court Jesse Lynch Holman, declined consideration.

Jennings's role in negotiating the Treaty of St. Mary's was a major issue in the campaign. In 1818, Jennings was appointed one of three federal commissioners to negotiate the cession of principally Miami and Potawatomi land in Northern and Central Indiana. Critics claimed Jennings's acceptance of the commission violated the state constitution, which prohibited the governor from simultaneously holding federal office. Acting on this interpretation, Harrison announced that Jennings had abandoned the governorship and briefly took possession of the state seal. The Indiana General Assembly conducted an investigation but declined to remove Jennings from office, whereupon Harrison resigned as lieutenant governor.

The Democratic-Republican Party was dominant nationally, and the politics of the state were conducted on a nonpartisan basis. Jennings's opponents framed the election as a referendum on the legality of the governor's actions during the treaty negotiations; his defenders responded that the importance of the territory opened to settlement by the "New Purchase" outweighed the constitutional question. Jennings was accused of being a Federalist and an alcoholic and charged with corruption in his management of the Bank of Indiana. Harrison, in contrast, was praised for his integrity, Republicanism, aversion to banks and speculation, and strict observance of the laws and the constitution.

The election result was a personal vindication of Jennings, who defeated Harrison by a large majority. Voters rewarded Jennings for his role in the acquisition of new territory, while the governor's enduring popularity from his long service as the U.S. delegate representing the Indiana Territory's at-large congressional district was reflected by his strong showing in the western part of the state.

== General election ==
=== Results ===
The original manuscript returns appear to be lost. Dorothy Riker and Gayle Thornbrough cite records kept by the Indiana House of Representatives as well as unofficial results from 21 of 31 counties in their comprehensive study of early Indiana election returns. Notably, the sum of all votes for Harrison in the unofficial county results exceeds his statewide total quoted in the Indiana House Journal by nearly 900 votes. Michael J. Dubin recapitulates the county data from Riker and Thornbrough, while noting the discrepancy with the legislative records. Phil Lampi's A New Nation Votes project recovers additional newspaper evidence with varying totals for Jennings and Harrison. The following tables defer to Lampi, who locates an additional 249 votes for Jennings and 97 votes for Harrison in Sullivan County compared with Riker and Thornbrough.

1819 Indiana gubernatorial election (Note: Lampi incorrectly tabulates the statewide figures for Jennings and Harrison based on the county data; the corrected figures appear below.)
Party	Candidate	Votes	%	±%
Nonpartisan	Jonathan Jennings (incumbent)	9,287	75.11	+18.13
Nonpartisan	Christopher Harrison	2,997	24.24	
Nonpartisan	Samuel Carr	80	0.65	
Nonpartisan	Peter Buell Allen	1	0.01	
Total votes		12,365	100.00%	

=== Results by county ===
The returns from Crawford and Lawrence counties were rejected by the General Assembly. The Indiana House Journal shows 80 votes for Samuel Carr and 1 vote for Peter Buell Allen, but incomplete county data recovered by Lampi accounts for only 59 votes for Carr and no votes for Allen; this table quotes the statewide figures for both men while calculating Jennings's and Harrison's totals based on the county data.

County	Jonathan Jennings		Christopher Harrison		Samuel Carr		Peter Buell Allen		Total
County	Votes	Percent	Votes	Percent	Votes	Percent	Votes	Percent	Total
Clark	618	63.84	311	32.13	39	4.03	—		968
Crawford (Note: Rejected.)	**		**		**		**		**
Daviess	**		**		**		**		**
Dearborn	1,015	86.31	161	13.69	—		—		1,176
Dubois	**		**		**		**		**
Fayette	631	96.93	20	3.07	—		—		651
Floyd	311	98.11	6	1.89	—		—		317
Franklin	1,087	97.31	30	2.69	—		—		1,117
Gibson	85	19.54	350	80.46	—		—		435
Harrison	847	95.71	38	4.29	—		—		885
Jackson	**		**		**		**		**
Jefferson	447	61.49	260	35.76	20	2.75	—		727
Jennings	189	96.92	6	3.08	—		—		195
Knox	144	27.53	379	72.47	—		—		523
Lawrence	**		**		**		**		**
Monroe	**		**		**		**		**
Orange	401	70.23	170	29.77	—		—		571
Owen	**		**		**		**		**
Perry	**		**		**		**		**
Pike	99	72.79	37	27.20	—		—		136
Posey	410	81.51	93	18.49	—		—		503
Randolph	1,101	78.20	307	21.80	—		—		1,408
Wayne	1,101	78.20	307	21.80	—		—		1,408
Ripley	159	98.76	2	1.24	—		—		161
Spencer	169	96.02	7	3.98	—		—		176
Sullivan	249	71.97	97	28.03	—		—		346
Switzerland	516	98.85	6	1.15	—		—		522
Vanderburg	**		**		**		**		**
Vigo	349	92.82	27	7.18	—		—		376
Warrick	125	67.93	59	32.07	—		—		184
Washington	335	34.68	631	65.32	—		—		966
Subtotal	9,287	75.24	2,997	24.28	59	0.48	0	0.00	12,343
TOTAL (Note: Including an additional 21 votes for Carr and one vote for Allen included in the Indiana House Journal, but missing from incomplete county data recovered by Lampi.)	9,287	75.11	2,997	24.24	80	0.65	1	0.01	12,365

== Bibliography ==
- Carmony, Donald Francis (1998). Indiana 1816-1850: the Pioneer Era. Indianapolis: Indiana Historical Society. ISBN 0-87195-125-8.
- Dubin, Michael J. (2003). United States Gubernatorial Elections, 1776–1860: The Official Results by State and County. Jefferson, NC: McFarland and Company.
- Nichols, David A. (June 2021). "Potawatomi Resistance, Renewal, and Removal". Indiana Magazine of History. 117 (2): 65–81.
- Riker, Dorothy; Thornbrough, Gayle (1960). Indiana Election Returns: 1816-1851. Indiana Historical Bureau.
- Riker, Dorothy (December 1932). "Jonathan Jennings". Indiana Magazine of History. 28 (4): 223–239.
- Lampi, Philip (2012). "Indiana 1819 Governor". A New Nation Votes. American Antiquarian Society.
