= Davis Floyd =

American politician (1776–1834)

Floyd County Circuit Court Judge
- In office 1817–1823

Indiana House of Representatives
- In office November 4, 1816 – November 3, 1817

Indiana Territorial Treasurer
- In office 1814–1816

Indiana Territorial Auditor
- In office 1813–1814

Indiana Territorial House of Representatives
- In office 1805–1806

Harrison County Sheriff
- In office 1803–1806

Clark County Recorder
- In office 1801–1802

Personal details
- Born: 1776 Virginia
- Died: December 13, 1834 (aged 57–58) Leon County, Florida
- Party: Democratic-Republican

Davis Floyd (1776 – December 13, 1834) was an Indiana Jeffersonian Republican politician who was convicted of aiding American Vice President Aaron Burr in the Burr conspiracy. Floyd was not convicted of treason however and returned to public life after several years working to redeem his reputation. He lost his wealth in the Panic of 1819 and died in obscurity in Florida 1834.

== Biography ==
=== Early life ===
Davis Floyd was born in 1776 to Robert and Lillian Floyd in Virginia. In 1779, the family moved to Jefferson County, Kentucky. Floyd had three siblings, Elizabeth, Charles, and Mary Lee.

As a boy in Kentucky, Floyd came to befriend William Clark, younger brother of George Rogers Clark. The Floyd family became political allies of Clark. Floyd served briefly as 2nd Lieutenant of the Jefferson County militia. Floyd married his first wife Susanna Johnston Lewis in Jefferson County in 1794. Floyd had three children by Susannah, Gabriel Jones, Charles, and Elizabeth. Susanna Lewis Floyd died circa 1807.

== Political career ==
In 1801, Floyd moved to Clarksville, Indiana. In the same year Floyd became Deputy Sheriff of Clark County and the Clark County Recorder. Floyd, along with his father, was appointed to the Clarksville Board of Trustees. Floyd ferried boats through the Falls of the Ohio rapids until 1808. Floyd was elected as a Clark County delegate to the territory's slavery convention in 1802, and the convention set in motion events that attempted to legalize slavery and indentured servitude in the Indiana Territory. Floyd became the Sheriff of Clark County in 1803 and served until 1806.

Floyd was elected to the Indiana Territorial Legislature in an 1805 special election; the legislature had been reduced to five members when the Michigan Territory was detached. Floyd was generally at odds with the rest of the legislature, he was the only anti-slavery representative during his term. By the end of his term he had become too involved in the Aaron Burr Conspiracy to run for re-election and was succeeded by James Beggs as Clark County's representative.

=== Involvement with Aaron Burr ===
In 1805, while a territorial legislator, Floyd became involved in the plot of Aaron Burr. Floyd and Burr had both become members of the board of directors of the Indiana Canal Company. The company, believed to have had something to do with the conspiracy, was to build a canal around the Falls of the Ohio on the Indiana side of the river. The company failed and the investors lost their money, which was believed to have been used to help finance Burr's plot. It was never proven that the money was stolen. The company had an initial investment of $120,000 and handled over one million dollars during its duration.

Floyd had also committed to Aaron Burr that he would raise a regiment of soldiers to support his cause of illegally invading Mexico. It is unknown if Floyd was aware of how the regiment was planned to be used. The regiment of 30 men and boats assembled on Silver Creek in Clark County and left from the Falls of the Ohio to sail downriver to Natchez, Louisiana. They expected to join army troops there but were betrayed by General James Wilkinson. They were unable to meet up with the rest of assembling regiments because President Thomas Jefferson, already aware of the plot, decided the men were guilty of treason and ordered them all arrested. Floyd fled Louisiana and returned to Indiana where he was captured.

In 1807, with Floyd in custody and the plot exposed, Davis along with Burr and his other conspirators, were charged with treason. The treason could not be proved against Burr and the treason charges were dropped against Floyd. He was however charged a $20 fine and imprisoned for 3 hours. Some believe that Floyd was unaware of Burr's larger plot but much of the public at the time considered him a "conscientious traitor".

Just days after his sentencing in the conspiracy with Burr, the Indiana Territorial Legislature elected him as Treasurer of the lower house. It was unknown to them at the time that Burr had been acquitted. After learning of those events, and President Thomas Jefferson's unhappiness with the outcome, the legislature decided to take action. On July 6, 1808, legislature passed resolutions condemning Burr's plot and stating that "Indiana had no sympathy for Burr." Gov. Thomas Posey revoked Floyd's military commission in the militia, probably at the request of President Jefferson.

=== After the conspiracy ===
On October 10, 1807, the anti-slavery elements of the territory assembled for a convention in Springville, the same site as the convention that started the territory's anti-slavery movement. Floyd served as secretary of the convention which issued a resolution to oppose the new laws passed by the pro-slavery legislature. Floyd left Clark County that year and moved into Harrison County.

After the death of his first wife, Davis remarried to Elizabeth Robards Davis March 20, 1809. She was the widow of Thomas Terry Davis, the judge of Davis's treason trial. He had one son, Robert, and a step daughter, Elizabeth, by his second wife. When hostilities broke out with the Indians in 1811, Floyd was reinstated in the militia to the rank of lieutenant. After the 1809 Treaty of Fort Wayne, Floyd served with William Henry Harrison during Tecumseh's War and was present at the Battle of Tippecanoe. Floyd was part of a company of dragoons under the command of Major Parkes. Floyd was also instrumental in conducting negotiations to prevent the Delaware Tribe from joining the Shawnee's war.

After the war, Floyd returned to public service serving as auditor of Indiana Territory in 1813. He was responsible for relocating the capital to Corydon from Vincennes. He sought out contractors to build the new capitol building and finally selected Dennis Pennington, a leading man in the Territorial Legislature. In 1814, he returned to the job of Indiana Territorial Treasurer until 1816. In 1815, he moved to Corydon, Indiana, along with the capital.

The state seal of Indiana

In 1816, Floyd was elected as a delegate to the Indiana Constitution Convention The same year, he was elected as Harrison County's representative to the first state legislature. On November 22, 1816, during his term as a legislator, Floyd proposed the official acceptance of the design the state seal. The seal was approved by the legislature. Floyd described the seal as A forest and a woodman felling a tree, a buffalo leaving the forest and fleeing through the plain to a distant forest, and sun in the west with the word Indiana The seal itself had been in use already and was probably designed by William Henry Harrison.

The same year he remarried to Elizabeth Robards after the death of his first wife. That year Floyd's company was awarded contracts to build the state executive buildings in Corydon. He built a new home for himself in Corydon in 1817, the home was later occupied by Governor and later Senator William Hendricks.

On October 13, 1817, he was appointed by Jonathan Jennings as the President Judge of the Second Circuit of Indiana. When Floyd County was formed in 1819, it was added to the Second Circuit, making Judge Davis the first Circuit Judge of Floyd County, Indiana. He served as judge until 1823. It is believed by some that Floyd County was named for him, but omitted from the record because of his involvement with Aaron Burr. According to the Indiana State Library the county was named for John Floyd, an early settler in Floyd County. John Floyd was Davis Floyds' uncle. However the original statute creating the county does not cite a source for the name.

Floyd participated in creating a masonic Grand Lodge in Coryon in 1817. He, along with most every notable man in the state, was a member of the Masonic fraternity.

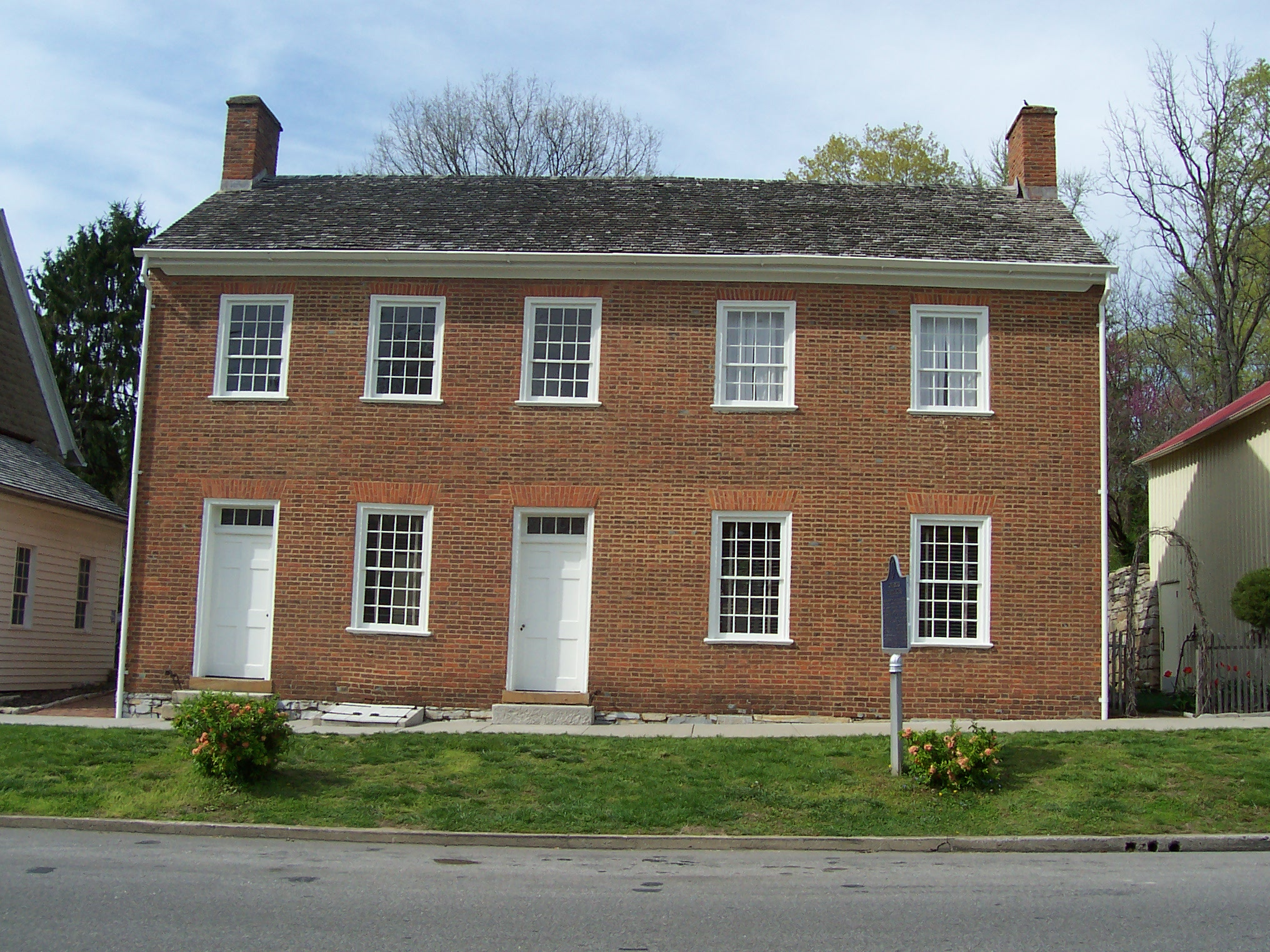
Home of Davis Floyd built in 1817 and lost in the Panic of 1819

Floyd built a home in Corydon, Indiana in 1817 and opened a general store in 1818, but in the Panic of 1819 Floyd lost most of his fortune, his store, and his home. His home was later bought by Governor William Hendricks and is now a part of the Corydon Capitol State Historic Site. He unsuccessfully tried to re-enter politics in 1822 but was defeated in the congressional election by the popular Jonathan Jennings. Floyd's life in Indiana is described as "shrewd and crafty" by the Indiana Historical Society.

== Life in Florida ==
With his political career seemingly at an end and his fortune gone, Floyd eventually accepted an appointment from Secretary of State John Quincy Adams to be a United States Commissioner and settle land disputes in newly acquired Florida Territory. He held his first session to settle disputes on August 4, 1823.

Floyd first settled in Alachua County in 1823 but had moved to Leon County by 1830. He served as mayor of St. Augustine, Florida in 1826 and as treasurer of the Florida Territorial Council from 1826 to 1828. In 1831 Floyd served as president of the Education Society, which sought to promote public education in Florida. The society was instrumental in establishing the Florida public school system.

He died in Florida on December 29, 1831. It was believed that his remains were returned to Corydon for burial although his burial location has never been located.

== See also ==
- Aaron Burr
- Burr conspiracy
- Charles Floyd
