= Jasper Packard =

American politician

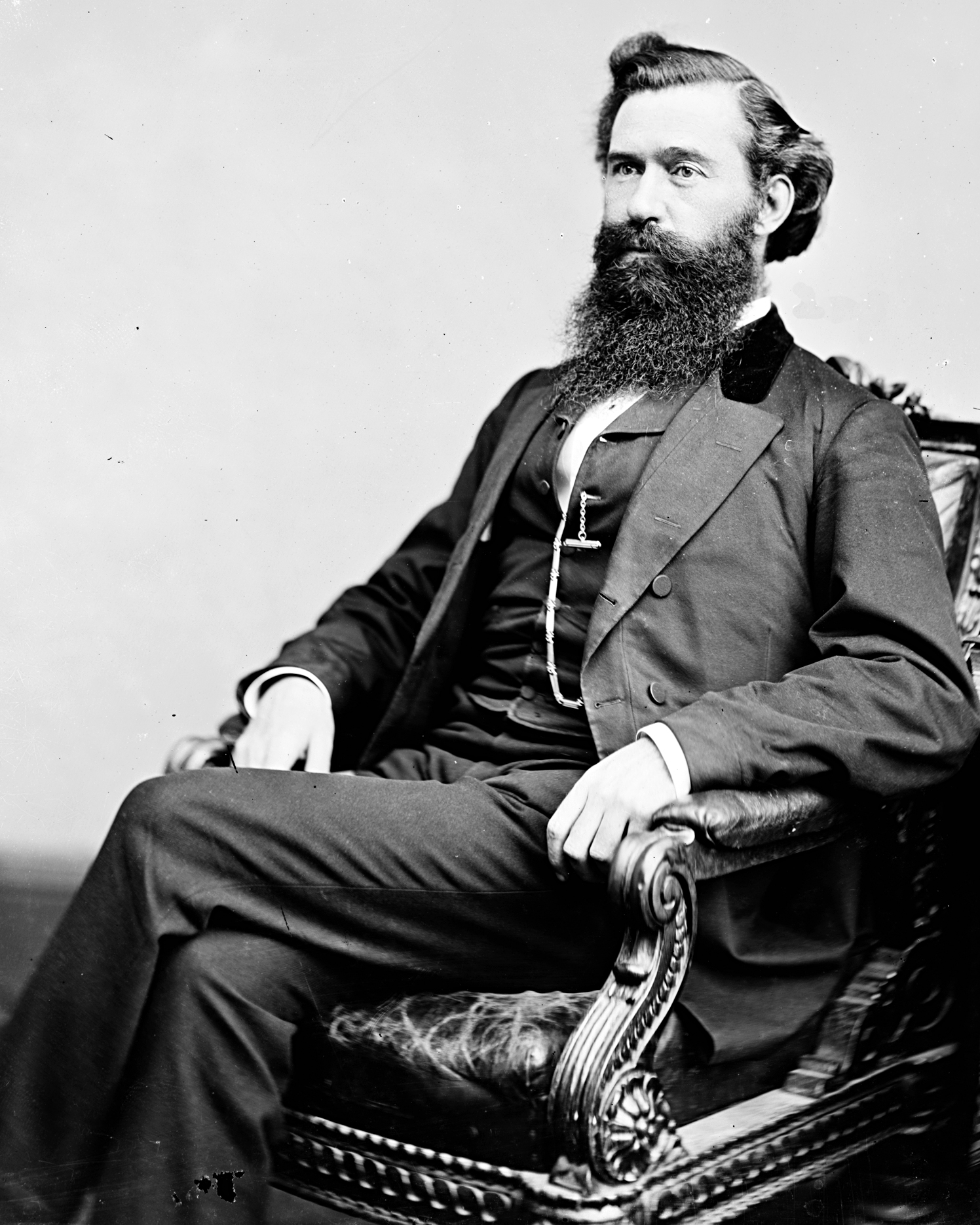

Member of the U.S. House of Representatives from Indiana
- In office March 4, 1869 – March 3, 1875
- Preceded by: John P. C. Shanks (11th); District established (AL)
- Succeeded by: James L. Evans (11th); District eliminated (AL)
- Constituency: 11th district (1869-73); At-large district (1873-75)

Personal details
- Born: Jasper Packard; February 1, 1832 Austintown, Ohio, U.S.
- Died: December 13, 1899 (aged 67) Lafayette, Indiana, U.S.
- Resting place: Soldiers' Home Cemetery
- Party: Republican
- Education: University of Michigan

Military service
- Branch/service: Union Army
- Battles/wars: American Civil War

Jasper Packard (February 1, 1832 – December 13, 1899) was an American attorney, Civil War veteran, and politician who, from 1869 to 1875, served three terms as a member of the United States House of Representatives for Indiana's at-large congressional district and Indiana's 11th congressional district.

== Early life and education ==
Born in Austintown, Ohio, Packard moved with his parents to Indiana in 1835. He attended local public schools and graduated from the University of Michigan in 1855.

== Career ==
Packard then taught school and he settled in La Porte, Indiana. He studied law and was admitted to the bar in 1861.

=== Civil War ===
During the Civil War, he enlisted in the Union Army as a private in the Forty-eighth Regiment. He was promoted to first lieutenant on January 1, 1862. He served as captain September 12, 1862. He also served as lieutenant colonel of the 128th Indiana Infantry and was promoted to colonel June 26, 1865.

=== Early public office ===
He served as the Auditor of La Porte County from November 15, 1866, to March 1, 1869,

=== Congress ===
Packard was elected as a Republican to the Forty-first, Forty-second, and Forty-third Congresses (March 4, 1869 – March 3, 1875). He served as chairman of the Committee on Expenditures in the Department of State (Forty-third Congress), Committee on Private Land Claims (Forty-third Congress). He was not a candidate for renomination in 1874.

=== Later career ===
He engaged in newspaper pursuits. He was later appointed commandant of the State soldiers' home at Lafayette, Indiana, on July 1, 1899.

== Death ==
Packard died in Lafayette on December 13, 1899, and was interred in the Soldiers' Home Cemetery.

U.S. House of Representatives
Preceded by John P. C. Shanks	Member of the U.S. House of Representatives from Indiana's 11th congressional district 1869–1873	Succeeded by Vacant
Preceded by District inactive	Member of the U.S. House of Representatives from Indiana's at-large congressional district 1873–1875	Succeeded by District inactive
