= William Hendricks =

American politician (1782–1850)

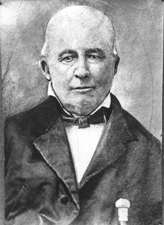
- Governor William Hendricks

Member of the Indiana Territorial Legislature
- In office 1813–1816

Member of the U.S. House of Representatives from Indiana's at-large district
- In office December 11, 1816 – July 25, 1822
- Preceded by: Jonathan Jennings
- Succeeded by: Jonathan Jennings

3rd Governor of Indiana
- In office December 5, 1822 – February 12, 1825
- Lieutenant: Ratliff Boon
- Preceded by: Ratliff Boon
- Succeeded by: James B. Ray

United States Senator from Indiana
- In office March 4, 1825 – March 3, 1837
- Preceded by: Waller Taylor
- Succeeded by: Oliver H. Smith

Personal details
- Born: November 12, 1782 Ligonier Valley, Westmoreland County, Pennsylvania, U.S.
- Died: May 16, 1850 (aged 67) Madison, Indiana, U.S.
- Party: Democratic; Anti-Jacksonian; Whig
- Spouse: Ann Parker Paul
- Education: Jefferson College

William Hendricks (November 12, 1782 – May 16, 1850) was a Democratic-Republican member of the House of Representatives from 1816 to 1822, the third governor of Indiana from 1822 to 1825, and an Anti-Jacksonian member of the U.S. Senate from 1825 to 1837. He led much of his family into politics and founded one of the largest political families in Indiana. He was the uncle of Thomas Andrews Hendricks, who was also Governor of Indiana and Vice President of the United States. Hendricks County was named in his honor. His term as governor was spent repairing the state's finances to later enable large scale internal improvements. The establishment of the basic framework of the state's public school system and the transfer of the capital from Corydon to Indianapolis also occurred during his term.

== Early life ==
=== Family and background ===
Hendricks was born in Ligonier Valley, Westmoreland County, Pennsylvania, on November 12, 1782, the son of Abraham and Ann Jamison Hendricks. His father was a prominent man in the community and a state legislator. He was the brother of Thomas Hendricks and John Hendricks, the uncle of Vice President Thomas Andrews Hendricks, and the father of William Hendricks Jr.

He attended a common school in Ligonier Valley where he was a classmate of Jonathan Jennings and William W. Wick, who later became his close political allies. After completion of the lower grades Hendricks attended Jefferson College (now Washington & Jefferson College) until 1810. After completing college he moved west to Ohio where his older brother Obadiah operated a law practice, and briefly lived in his home. He studied law with him a short time and was admitted to the bar. From 1810 to 1812 he made a living as a school teacher while he studied law in Cincinnati and lived in the home of his sister, Ann. He remained there until he was admitted to the bar.

=== Move to Indiana Territory ===
After 1813 he moved to Madison in the Indiana Territory. Madison remained his home for the rest of his life. During his early days in there, he set up a printing press he brought with him from Cincinnati, and became the proprietor of the Western Eagle, the second newspaper to be printed in the territory. His paper and the positions he supported helped him to quickly gain popularity in the local community. The anti-slavery eastern part of the territory was at that time locked in a struggle with the pro-slavery western party for control of the territorial government. The Western Eagle combated the pro-slavery Vincennes Sun, and garnered considerable support from the eastern settlers. He later used his printing press to print the first codification of Indiana state laws during his term as governor.

Hendricks married Ann Parker Paul of Hardin County, Kentucky. She was the daughter of Colonel John Paul, who was the founder of Madison. The couple had nine children. William Hendricks Jr. became a state legislator. Two sons were killed during the American Civil War and two other children died in infancy. Ann outlived her husband by some thirty-seven years, and died at Madison on September 12, 1887.

== Public office ==
=== Territorial legislator ===
In February 1813 Hendricks was elected clerk of the territorial legislature in Vincennes. In May the capital was moved to Corydon following the outbreak of the War of 1812 and the reorganization of the territory. The legislature, which was then dominated by the anti-slavery and pro-statehood faction, appointed Hendricks as printer and charged with publishing the assembly's records. The following year he was elected as a representative of Jefferson County, of which Madison was the county seat. In the legislature he fell into party with speaker Dennis Pennington and the anti-slavery faction. In 1814 Hendricks was chosen to succeed Pennington and became speaker of the legislative assembly. The same year he opened his own law practice and stopped printing his newspaper for lack of time for the enterprise. He received several lucrative positions from the territorial government, including being appointed prosecutor of several eastern counties. He was also appointed by President James Madison as U.S. Attorney for the entire territory.

In 1816 he attended the state Constitutional Convention held in Corydon as an unofficial delegate. Although only two years since he entered the territory, he had become so well known and popularized that he served as the convention's secretary. He was again in party with Jonathan Jennings, Dennis Pennington, and others seeking to institute a constitutional ban on slavery. His actions at the convention further strengthened his reputation for business aptitude and political skills.

=== Congressman ===
Jennings was elected governor of Indiana in 1816, leaving his congressional seat vacant. That same year Hendricks was elected to represent Indiana's at-large congressional district in the United States House of Representatives. He was re-elected in 1817, defeating former territorial governor Thomas Posey. Hendricks's election occurred shortly before Indiana's statehood had been approved by Congress and there was a brief debate about the legality of seating him when he arrived in Washington, D.C., but the situation was resolved in his favor. Hendricks was reelected again in 1818 and 1820, serving from December 11, 1816, until July 25, 1822, when he resigned. In Congress he was a member of the Select Committee on Roads and Canals. He supported legislation to fund the construction of the National Road, which would connect Indiana with the eastern states. He also supported several measures to fund other minor road and canal projects, but was unsuccessful. He was a proponent of rapidly granting statehood to the western states, and delivered several speeches urging the statehood of Illinois and Missouri. In his final reelection bid, he won by a margin of ten to one, and was recognized as one of the most popular political figures in the state.

=== Governor ===
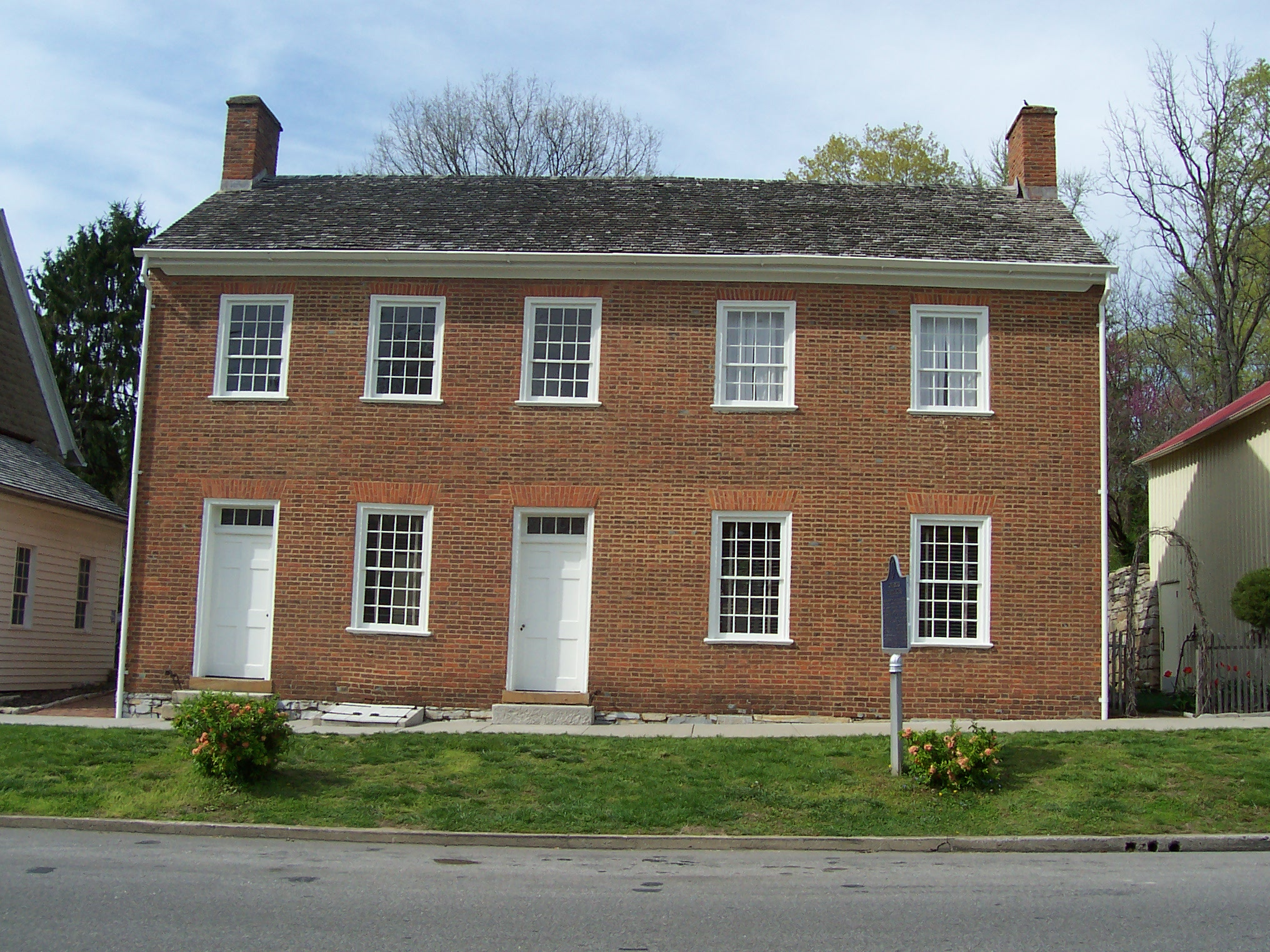
Governor's Headquarters, home of Governor William Hendricks

In 1822 Hendricks ran unopposed for the position of Governor of Indiana and succeeded Jonathan Jennings; Jennings in turn succeeded Hendricks in his congressional seat. Hendricks won 100% of the 18,340 votes, the only governor in Indiana history to win by that margin. He assumed the office on December 5, 1822. While governor he occupied the Governor's Headquarters in Corydon, which he purchased from Davis Floyd. He served as governor from 1822 until 1825. He was the last governor to serve while the capital remained in Corydon.

When he came to office, the state was still in a poor financial condition because the state's bank failures caused by the Panic of 1819 and the ensuing collapse of the modest internal improvement programs. The state's bonds had been depreciated in 1821 and severely hurt the state's credit and ability to borrow funds. The state budget was still in deficit, and the state's sparse population was producing very little revenue. The situation was resolved by selling public land to raise money to pay off a significant portion of the outstanding debt, and government accounts were moved to the Second Bank of the United States since there were no banks operating in Indiana.

The foundation of state's school system—the first state-funded system in the nation—also began to be laid during Hendricks's administration. During his tenure as governor each township was granted land on which a public school could be established. The value of these improvements totaled over $1.25 million, making it the highest dollar item on the budget to that date. Construction of the State Seminary, later to become Indiana University, also began during his term. Hendricks also contributed personally to Hanover College. As the state's finances would not allow the large-scale improvements Hendricks envisioned, he focused efforts on creating critical routes and approved legislation that required state residents to spend allotted amounts of time helping to build the state roads. Existing roads and rivers were improved by clearing obstacles.

Hendricks codified Indiana's laws for the first time in 1822, creating the Indiana Code. In 1824 a Seneca family was murdered by a group of men near Pendleton, Indiana, and tension between the natives in northern Indiana and the settlements in central Indiana moved quickly toward conflict. Governor Hendricks, hoping to maintain peace and enforce justice for the tribe, ordered the murderers to be captured and tried. While one of the murderers escaped, the others where captured and all were sentenced to death. One of the murderers was a minor and was later pardoned by Governor James B. Ray. Governor Hendricks had denied his appeal for clemency and used the execution to show the natives his goodwill. This was the first time a white man was executed for killing a Native American in the United States.

One of his final acts as governor was to approve a move of the capitol from Corydon to Indianapolis. There had been an intense debate to keep the capitol in the south where almost all of the state's population resided. Indianapolis was 60 miles (97 km) north of the nearest settlement and on the edge of the frontier. Despite considerable pressure, Hendricks signed the measure in late 1824.

=== Senator ===
On February 14, 1825, Hendricks resigned his position as Governor to become a United States senator after being elected to that position by the legislature, defeating Chief Justice Isaac Blackford. Lieutenant Governor Ratliff Boon had resigned earlier and the governorship devolved to James B. Ray, the Senate president pro tempore. Back in Congress in 1825, Hendricks was an Anti-Jacksonian, supporting federal funding for western internal improvements. He chaired the committee on roads and canals from 1831 until 1837 and joined fellow Indiana congressman Ratliff Boon in support of federal funding for the Wabash and Erie Canal in the Senate. He failed in his attempt to be reelected to his seat in the Senate in 1836. He served in the Senate from March 4, 1825, to March 3, 1837, after having lost the election in 1836 to Whig Oliver H. Smith. Hendricks also served as a trustee on the Indiana University Board from 1829 to 1840.

In 1834, he was one of only two Anti-Jacksonian senators to vote against the censure of President Andrew Jackson.

== Later life ==
Having served in public office for twenty-nine years continually, Hendricks returned to private life in Madison in 1839.

During his life he had gathered a large estate which he returned to manage and to also practice law. Being a large landholder in the Madison area, he built many homes and leased them to individuals. In his later years he was criticized for not wanting to sell them, and was accused of behaving in an aristocratic fashion in that regard.

On May 16, 1850, while he was overseeing the construction of his family vault, he suddenly became ill. He died the same day and was buried in the Fairmount Cemetery.

In his obituary the Indiana Gazetteer said:

"Governor Hendricks was for many years by far the most popular man in the State. He had been its sole representative in Congress for six years, elected on each occasion by large majorities, and no member of that body, probably, was more attentive to the interests of the State he represented, or more industrious in arranging all the private or local business entrusted to him. He left no letter unanswered, no public office or document did he fail to visit or examine on request; with personal manners very engaging, he long retained his popularity."

== See also ==
- List of governors of Indiana

Party political offices
Preceded by Jonathan Jennings	Democratic-Republican nominee for Governor of Indiana; 1822	Succeeded by None
U.S. House of Representatives
Preceded by District created	Member of the U.S. House of Representatives from Indiana's at-large congressional district 1816-1822	Succeeded by Jonathan Jennings
Political offices
Preceded by Ratliff Boon	Governor of Indiana; 1822–1825	Succeeded by James B. Ray
U.S. Senate
Preceded by Waller Taylor	U.S. senator (Class 3) from Indiana; 1825–1837; Served alongside: James Noble, Robert Hanna, John Tipton	Succeeded by Oliver H. Smith
