= William Hendricks Jr. =

American politician

William Hendricks Jr. (1809–1850) was born in Westmoreland County, Pennsylvania, January 7, 1809. He was the son of future Governor William Hendricks.

Hendricks was a member of Indiana House of Representatives, 1846 through 1847 and a member of Indiana Senate from 1848 to 1850. He died in Madison, Indiana on July 19, 1850.
