= 1820 United States House of Representatives election in Indiana =

1820 United States House of Representatives election in Indiana's at-large congressional district
- August 7, 1820
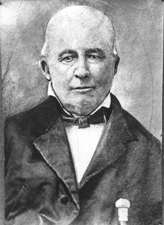

Nominee	William Hendricks	Reuben W. Nelson
Popular vote	16,331	1,623
Percentage	90.96%	9.04%
- County results Hendricks: 70–80% 80–90% >90% Nelson: 60–70% Non-voting area
U.S. representative before election
William Hendricks
Elected U.S. representative
William Hendricks

The 1820 United States House of Representatives election in Indiana took place on August 7, 1820. Incumbent U.S. representative William Hendricks defeated Reuben W. Nelson to represent Indiana's at-large congressional district in the 17th United States Congress.

Political parties did not play an important role in Indiana congressional elections before the 1830s. Hendricks, an independent politician, was a prominent member of the eastern, antislavery Political faction in Indiana. He was enormously popular across the state and faced minimal opposition to his bid for re-election. On Election Day, Hendricks carried every county but Knox, which included the slaveholding commercial center of Vincennes, Indiana.

== Candidates ==
=== Hendricks ===
Hendricks was born in Westmoreland County, Pennsylvania, in 1782 and graduated from Jefferson College. He left Pennsylvania after 1810, migrating first to Cincinnati and then to Madison, Indiana, where he worked as an attorney at law. He became involved in territorial politics, winning election to the legislature from Jefferson County, Indiana, in 1813. Between 1813 and 1816 he held several appointive positions, including that of territorial printer, prosecutor, and United States Attorney. He served as speaker of the territorial House of Representatives and as secretary of the Indiana constitutional convention in 1816, despite not being a delegate.

Hendricks was one of the leaders of the eastern faction during the territorial period, which lobbied successfully for the abolition of slavery in Indiana. He was elected to Congress in 1816 and re-elected in 1817 and 1818, each time defeating candidates from the western, proslavery faction. In Congress, Hendricks opposed the admission of Missouri as a slave state during the Missouri Crisis, supported Latin American independence, and represented militiamen seeking payment for their service during the War of 1812.

=== Nelson ===
Nelson was born in Duchess County, New York, in 1777. He moved to the Indiana Territory in around the year 1810 and became a prominent attorney and Mason in Jeffersonville, Indiana. As editor of the Corydon Indiana Herald, Nelson was critical of Hendricks and the eastern faction. He ran against Hendricks in 1817, but withdrew and endorsed Thomas Posey shortly before the election. He challenged Hendricks again in 1818, losing the general election by a wide margin.

== General election ==
=== Results ===
1820 Indiana's at-large congressional district
Party	Candidate	Votes	%	±%
Nonpartisan	William Hendricks	16,331	90.96	▲0.51
Nonpartisan	Reuben W. Nelson	1,623	9.04	▼0.49
Total votes		17,954	100.00	

==== Results by county ====
County	William Hendricks		Reuben W. Nelson		Margin		Total
County	Votes	%	Votes	%	Votes	%	Total
Clark	907	77.26	267	22.74	640	54.51	1,174
Crawford	211	89.03	26	10.97	185	78.06	237
Daviess	375	97.91	8	2.09	367	95.82	383
Dearborn	1,177	98.41	19	1.59	1,158	96.82	1,196
Dubois	74	98.67	1	1.33	73	97.33	75
Fayette	757	99.34	5	0.66	752	98.69	762
Floyd	248	77.50	72	22.50	176	55.00	320
Franklin	1,364	98.84	16	1.16	1,348	97.68	1,380
Gibson	461	99.35	3	0.65	458	98.71	464
Harrison	820	70.75	339	29.25	481	41.50	1,159
Jackson	382	83.77	74	16.23	308	67.54	456
Jefferson	985	94.71	55	5.29	930	89.42	1,040
Jennings	222	97.37	6	2.63	216	94.74	228
Knox	302	38.77	477	61.23	-175	-22.46	779
Lawrence	524	99.05	5	0.94	519	98.11	529
Martin	137	99.28	1	0.72	136	98.55	138
Monroe	320	100.00	—		320	100.00	320
Orange	719	99.04	7	0.96	712	98.07	726
Owen	88	100.00	—		88	100.00	88
Perry	251	98.05	5	1.95	246	96.09	256
Pike	188	100.00	—		188	100.00	188
Posey	559	99.64	2	0.36	557	99.29	561
Randolph	165	100.00	—		165	100.00	165
Ripley	224	100.00	—		224	100.00	224
Scott	228	96.61	8	3.39	220	93.22	236
Spencer	185	100.00	—		185	100.00	185
Sullivan	417	81.44	95	18.55	322	62.89	512
Switzerland	604	99.50	3	0.49	601	99.01	607
Vanderburgh	174	97.21	5	2.79	169	94.41	179
Vigo	495	94.28	30	5.71	465	88.57	525
Warrick	115	100.00	—		115	100.00	115
Washington	868	90.23	94	9.77	774	80.46	962
Wayne	1,785	100.00	—		1,785	100.00	1,785
TOTAL	16,331	90.96	1,623	9.04	14,708	81.92	17,954

== Bibliography ==
- Blackburn, Glen A.; Robertson, Nellie Armstrong; Riker, Dorothy, eds. (1942). The John Tipton Papers. Vol. 1: 1809–1827. Indianapolis: Indiana Historical Bureau.
- Carmony, Donald Francis (1998). Indiana 1816-1850: the Pioneer Era. Indianapolis: Indiana Historical Society. ISBN 0-87195-125-8.
- Cayton, Andrew L. (1996). Frontier Indiana. Bloomington: Indiana University Press.
- Hill, Frederick D. (December 1974). "William Hendricks' Political Circulars to his Constituents: Congressional Period, 1816-1822". Indiana Magazine of History. 70 (4): 296–344. JSTOR 27789995.
- Lampi, Philip J. (2012). "Indiana 1820 U.S. House of Representatives". A New Nation Votes. American Antiquarian Society.
- Riker, Dorothy; Thornbrough, Gayle (1960). Indiana Election Returns: 1816-1851. Indianapolis: Indiana Historical Bureau.
- Salafia, Matthew (2013). Slavery's Borderland: Slavery and Bondage Along the Ohio River. Philadelphia: University of Pennsylvania Press.
