= Indiana's at-large congressional district =

Former U.S. House district in Indiana

Coordinates: 40°N 86°W

From its statehood in 1816 until 1823, Indiana was allocated only one representative, who was elected at-large. During the 43rd Congress, from 1873 to 1875, Indiana elected three of its thirteen representatives to the United States House of Representatives at-large from the entire state.

== List of members representing the district ==
Indiana admitted December 11, 1816, with one at-large congressional seat.

| Cong ress | Years | 1st seat | | | 2nd seat | | | 3rd seat | | |
| Cong ress | Years | Representative | Party | Electoral history | Representative | Party | Electoral history | Representative | Party | Electoral history |
|---|---|---|---|---|---|---|---|---|---|---|
| 14th 15th 16th 17th | December 11, 1816 – July 25, 1822 | William Hendricks (Madison) | Democratic-Republican | Elected in August 1816. Re-elected August 4, 1817, after the term began but before the Congress convened. Re-elected August 3, 1818. Re-elected August 7, 1820. Resigned to become Governor of Indiana. | | | | | | |
| 17th | July 25, 1822 – December 2, 1822 | Vacant | | | | | | | | |
| 17th | December 2, 1822 – March 3, 1823 | Jonathan Jennings (Charlestown) | Democratic-Republican | Elected to finish Hendricks's term. Redistricted to the 2nd district. | | | | | | |
| 18th 19th 20th 21st 22nd 23rd 24th 25th 26th 27th 28th 29th 30th 31st 32nd 33rd 34th 35th 36th 37th 38th 39th 40th 41st 42nd | March 3, 1823 – March 3, 1873 | District inactive | | | | | | | | |
| 43rd | March 4, 1873 – March 3, 1875 | Jasper Packard (Laporte) | Republican | Redistricted from the 11th district and re-elected in 1872. Retired. | Godlove S. Orth (Lafayette) | Republican | Elected in 1872. Retired. | William Williams (Warsaw) | Republican | Redistricted from the 10th district and re-elected in 1872. Retired. |

District inactive since March 4, 1875.
