= 1816 Indiana gubernatorial election =

- August 5, 1816
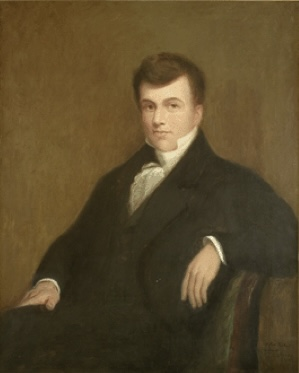

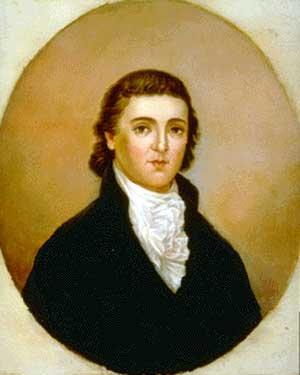
Nominee	Jonathan Jennings	Thomas Posey
Popular vote	5,211	3,934
Percentage	56.98%	43.02%
- County results Jennings: 80–90% >90% Posey: 50–60% 70–80% 80–90% No data Non-voting area
Governor before election
Thomas Posey (Note: As governor of the Indiana Territory.)
Elected Governor
Jonathan Jennings

The 1816 Indiana gubernatorial election took place on August 5, 1816. Jonathan Jennings, the longtime U.S. delegate representing the Indiana Territory's at-large congressional district and former president of the Indiana constitutional convention, defeated the incumbent territorial governor Thomas Posey.

This was the first gubernatorial election held following ratification of the Constitution of Indiana. The short turnaround between the adjournment of the constitutional convention on June 29 and the date of the election left a narrow window for electioneering. Of the roughly 12,000 eligible voters, more than 9,000 cast ballots for governor, indicating substantial popular interest in the election.

The Democratic-Republican Party was dominant nationally following the War of 1812, and the politics of the new state were conducted on a nonpartisan basis. Jennings and Posey represented Political factions held over from the territorial period. Jennings, a resident of Clark County, was the leader of the antislavery eastern faction, while Posey was associated with the proslavery western faction based out of Vincennes.

Posey, a Federalist and a slaveholder, was unpopular, politically isolated, and too ill to actively campaign. He had opposed the movement for statehood as premature, for which he was accused of seeking to retain his position as the unelected territorial governor. With his residence in Jeffersonville, he was too far from the territorial capital in Corydon to effectively respond to events. Jennings conducted a campaign typical of the era, speaking to voters directly at log rollings, militia musters, and other public functions, while maintaining the pretense of indifference to his election expected of nineteenth-century candidates. Posey's surrogates attempted to link Jennings to the recent unpopular congressional salary increase and the non-payment of militiamen during the War of 1812. Charges that Jennings had pursued statehood against the wishes of the western counties failed to mobilize the electorate against the new constitution. On Election Day, Jennings defeated Posey with strong support from voters in the eastern counties, while Posey performed well in the western part of the state.

== General election ==
=== Results ===
1816 Indiana gubernatorial election
Party	Candidate	Votes	%
Nonpartisan	Jonathan Jennings	5,211	56.98%
Nonpartisan	Thomas Posey (incumbent)	3,934	43.02%
Total votes		9,145	100.00
Turnout		9,145	75.50
Registered electors		12,112	

=== Results by county ===
The original manuscript returns appear to be lost. Records kept by the Indiana House of Representatives show topline figures for Jennings and Posey, noted above, but omit the county-level data. Phil Lampi locates complete or partial data for eight out of fifteen counties.

County	Jonathan Jennings		Thomas Posey		Margin		Total
County	Votes	Percent	Votes	Percent	Votes	Percent	Total
Clark	**		**		544	**	**
Dearborn	**		**		**		**
Franklin	506	90.52	53	9.48	453	81.04	559
Gibson	**		**		**		**
Harrison	**		**		**		**
Jackson	124	84.93	22	15.07	102	69.86	146
Jefferson	**		**		**		**
Knox	174	23.36	571	76.64	-397	-53.29	745
Perry	**		**		**		**
Posey	**		**		279	**	326
Switzerland	**		**		279	**	**
Orange	66	12.86	447	86.94	-381	-74.27	513
Warrick	**		**		**		**
Washington	257	41.72	359	58.28	-102	-16.56	616
Wayne	**		**		**		**

== Bibliography ==
- Carmony, Donald Francis (1998). Indiana 1816-1850: the Pioneer Era. Indianapolis: Indiana Historical Society. ISBN 0-87195-125-8.
- Dubin, Michael J. (2003). United States Gubernatorial Elections, 1776–1860: The Official Results by State and County. Jefferson, NC: McFarland and Company.
- Lampi, Philip J. (January 11, 2012). "Indiana 1816 Governor". A New Nation Votes. American Antiquarian Society.
- Posey, John Thornton (Winter 1990). "A Federalist on the Frontier: General Thomas Posey". Illinois Historical Journal. 83 (4): 247–58.
- Riker, Dorothy; Thornbrough, Gayle (1960). Indiana Election Returns: 1816-1851. Indianapolis: Indiana Historical Bureau.
- Riker, Dorothy (December 1932). "Jonathan Jennings". Indiana Magazine of History. 28 (4): 223–239.
