= Indiana Territory's at-large congressional district =

American congressional district

Coordinates: 42°N 88°W

- Obsolete district
- Created: 1805, as a non-voting delegate was granted by Congress
- Eliminated: 1816, as a result of statehood
- Years active: 1805–1816

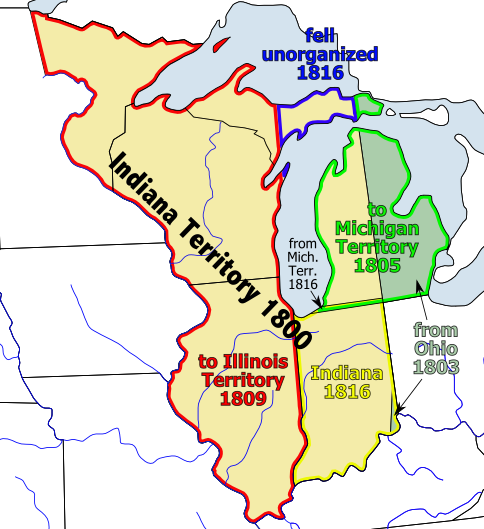
The Indiana Territory shown between 1800 and 1819

The Indiana Territory's at-large congressional district encompassed the entire area of the Indiana Territory.

A delegate to the United States Congress was elected from this district.

The territory was created from portions of the Northwest Territory leading up to the State of Ohio achieving statehood.

== List of delegates representing the district ==
The territory sent one non-voting delegate to the United States House of Representatives.

Delegate	Party	Years	Cong ress	Electoral history
Benjamin Parke (Vincennes)	Federalist	December 12, 1805 – March 1, 1808	9th 10th	Elected in 1805. Re-elected September 3, 1807. Resigned to serve on the staff of Governor of Indiana Territory.
Vacant		March 1, 1808 – October 22, 1808	10th	
Jesse Burgess Thomas (Lawrenceburg)	Democratic-Republican	October 22, 1808 – March 3, 1809	10th	Elected October 22, 1808 to finish the vacant term. Moved to Illinois Territory.
Vacant		March 4, 1809 – November 27, 1809	11th	
Jonathan Jennings (Charlestown)	Democratic-Republican	November 27, 1809 – December 11, 1816	11th 12th 13th 14th	Elected in 1809. Re-elected in 1811. Re-elected in 1812. Re-elected August 1, 1814. Retired to become Governor of Indiana when statehood achieved.

The area of Indiana Territory was reduced in 1805 by the creation of Michigan Territory, and again in 1809 by the creation of Illinois Territory.

== Indiana becomes a state of the union ==
On December 11, 1816, Indiana was admitted into the union as a state.

== See also ==
- Northwest Territory's at-large congressional district
- List of United States congressional districts
