= Waller Taylor =

American politician

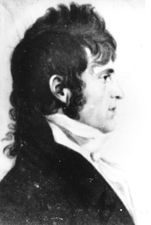

Virginia House of Delegates
- In office 1800–1802

Indiana Territorial judge
- In office 1806–1816

Indiana Territorial Legislature
- In office 1809–1816

United States Senator from Indiana
- In office December 11, 1816 – March 3, 1825
- Preceded by: None
- Succeeded by: William Hendricks

Personal details
- Born: December 7, 1775 Lunenburg County, Virginia
- Died: August 26, 1826 (age 50) Lunenburg, Virginia
- Party: Democratic-Republican; National Republican Party

Military service
- Branch/service: United States Army
- Rank: general
- Battles/wars: Tecumseh's War; War of 1812

Waller Taylor (December 7, 1775 - August 26, 1826) was an American military commander, politician, and one of the first two senators from the state of Indiana.

== Biography ==
Taylor was born in Lunenburg County, Virginia where he spent his entire childhood. He studied law and served in the Virginia House of Delegates from 1800 to 1802.

In 1804 he moved to Vincennes, Indiana and practiced law there. He was appointed chancellor of the Indiana Territory in 1807. Also in 1807, he became a major in the territorial militia. He fought against Native Americans and served as an aide-de-camp to William Henry Harrison during the Tecumseh's War in 1809 to 1810. He participated in the Battle of Tippecanoe.

Taylor continued in the United States Army during the War of 1812 and rose to the rank of adjutant general.

Taylor was a strong supporter of slavery and believed that slavery should have been allowed in Indiana. The slavery party had lost its majority status in the 1809 election and Taylor was part of the pro-slavery party trying regain power. He campaigned to become the congressional representative for Indiana in 1812 but was defeated by Jonathan Jennings. He had a hot temper and during the campaign challenged Jennings to a duel; Jennings declined.

In 1816, when Indiana became a state, he was chosen along with James Noble to join the United States Senate as the first senators from Indiana. Taylor was elected to a full term in 1818 and left the Senate when that term expired in 1825.

Taylor was a member of the faction in the United States Senate that supported John Quincy Adams and Henry Clay. He was also associated with the United States Democratic-Republican Party and the United States National Republican Party.

Little else is known about the rest of Taylor's life except that he returned to Lunenburg, Virginia, and died there a year after leaving the Senate, of natural causes.

Taylor was buried on his family's land in Lunenburg, Virginia.

U.S. Senate
Preceded by None	U.S. senator (Class 3) from Indiana; 1816–1825; Served alongside: James Noble	Succeeded by William Hendricks
