= Jonathan Jennings =

American politician (1784–1834)

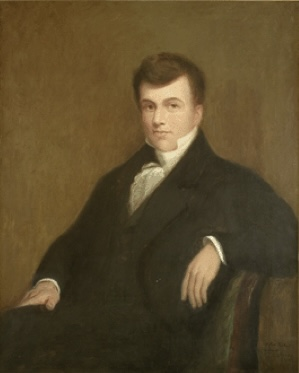
- Portrait by James Forbes, c. 1819

Member of the U.S. House of Representatives from Indiana
- In office December 2, 1822 – March 4, 1831
- Preceded by: William Hendricks
- Succeeded by: John Carr
- Constituency: At-large district (1822-23); 2nd district (1823-31)

1st Governor of Indiana
- In office November 7, 1816 – September 12, 1822
- Lieutenant: Christopher Harrison; Ratliff Boon
- Preceded by: Thomas Posey (Indiana Territory)
- Succeeded by: Ratliff Boon

Delegate to the U.S. House of Representatives from the Indiana Territory's At-large district
- In office November 27, 1809 – December 11, 1816
- Preceded by: Jesse B. Thomas
- Succeeded by: William Hendricks (Representative)

Personal details
- Born: March 27, 1784
- Died: July 26, 1834 (aged 50) Charlestown, Indiana, U.S.
- Party: Democratic-Republican
- Spouse(s): Ann Gilmore Hay; Clarissa Barbee

Jonathan Jennings (March 27, 1784 – July 26, 1834) was an American politician who was the first elected governor of Indiana. He was elected nine times to the United States House of Representatives from Indiana's at large and 2nd congressional districts. Born in either Hunterdon County, New Jersey, or Rockbridge County, Virginia, he studied law before migrating to the Indiana Territory in 1806. Jennings initially intended to practice law, but took jobs as an assistant at the federal land office at Vincennes and assistant to the clerk of the territorial legislature to support himself and pursued interests in land speculation and politics. In 1808 Jennings moved to the eastern part of the Indiana Territory and settled near Charlestown, in Clark County. In Charleston, he soon emerged as a leading opponent of the territorial governor, William Henry Harrison. He was elected as the Indiana Territory's delegate to the U.S. House of Representatives by dividing the pro-Harrison supporters and running as an anti-Harrison candidate. By 1812, he was the leader of the anti-slavery and pro-statehood faction of the territorial government. Jennings and his political allies took control of the territorial assembly and dominated governmental affairs after the resignation of Governor Harrison in 1812. As a congressional delegate Jennings aided passage of the Enabling Act in 1816, which authorized the organization of Indiana's state government and state constitution. He was elected president of the Indiana constitutional convention, held in Corydon in June 1816, where he helped draft the state's first constitution. Jennings supported the effort to ban slavery in the state and favored a strong legislative branch of government.

In August 1816, Jennings was elected to serve as the first governor of Indiana at age 32, and re-elected for an additional term. He pressed for the construction of roads and schools, and negotiated the Treaty of St. Mary's to open up central Indiana to American settlement. His opponents attacked his participation in the treaty negotiations as unconstitutional and brought impeachment proceedings against him, a measure that was narrowly defeated by a vote of 15 to 13 after a month-long investigation and the resignation of the lieutenant governor. During his second term and following the panic of 1819, Jennings encountered financial problems, a situation exacerbated by his inability to keep up with his business interests and run the state government simultaneously. Ineligible for another term as Indiana governor under the state constitution, Jennings looked for other means of financial support. Shortly before completion of his second term as governor in 1822, Jennings was elected to the U.S. House of Representatives, before retiring from public service in 1831. In Congress Jennings promoted federal spending on internal improvements.

Jennings had been a heavy drinker of alcohol for much of his life. His addiction worsened after the death of his first wife, Ann, and his development of rheumatism. His alcoholism led to defeat in his reelection campaign in 1830. In retirement his condition worsened and he was unable to work his farm. When his finances collapsed, his creditors sought to take his land holdings and Charlestown farm. To protect his friend, U.S. Senator John Tipton purchased Jennings's farm and permitted him to continue living there. After Jennings's death, his estate was sold, but it left no funds to purchase a headstone for his grave, which remained unmarked for fifty-seven years.

Historians have offered varied interpretations of Jennings's life and impact on the development of Indiana. Early state historians, Jacob Piatt Dunn Jr. and William Wesley Woollen, gave Jennings high praise and credited him with the defeat of the pro-slavery forces in Indiana and with laying the foundation of the state. More critical historians during the prohibition era, such as Logan Eseray, described Jennings as a crafty and self-promoting politician and focused on his alcoholism. Among the modern historians, Randy Mills places Jennings's importance between the two extremes, but agreed with Woolen's assessment that the state "owes him more than she can compute."

== Early life ==
=== Family background ===
Jonathan Jennings, the son of Jacob and Mary Kennedy Jennings, was born in either Readington Township, Hunterdon County, New Jersey, or Rockbridge County, Virginia, on March 27, 1784. He was the sixth of the Jennings's eight children. His father was a doctor, Presbyterian missionary, and an ordained minister in the Dutch Reformed Church. His mother, who was well educated and practiced medicine, was the daughter of Samuel Kennedy, a Presbyterian minister at Basking Ridge, New Jersey. Mary, who may have had a medical degree, assisted her husband in his practice. Around 1790, Jennings's father moved the family to Dunlap Creek in Fayette County, Pennsylvania, where Jennings remained until his adulthood. After his mother's death in 1792, Jennings was raised by his older sister, Sarah, and his brother, Ebenezer. Jennings was particularly close to Ebenezer and his younger sister, Ann, and her husband, David G. Mitchell, who was a physician. Jennings was schooled at home, then attended the nearby grammar school in Canonsburg, Pennsylvania, where he received a basic education. Two of his classmates, William Hendricks and William W. Wick, would later become his political allies. Jennings studied law in Washington, Pennsylvania. By 1806, Jennings had left Pennsylvania and moved to Steubenville, Ohio, where his brother, Obadiah, had a law office. Jennings helped Obadiah in cases before the Ohio Supreme Court.

In 1806, Jennings headed west to Jeffersonville in the Indiana Territory, but stayed only briefly. He moved to Vincennes, the capital of the Indiana Territory, in early 1807 to open his own law practice and was admitted to the bar in April. Jennings had difficulty earning an income as a lawyer, finding there were too few clients in the territory to keep him busy. In July 1807, Nathaniel Ewing, the federal land receiver at Vincennes and a friend from Pennsylvania, invited Jennings to take a job as assistant to John Badollet, the registrar at the federal land office in Vincennes. Along with Badollet, Jennings engaged in land speculation. He obtained significant land holdings and made substantial profits. In 1807 Jennings became an assistant to the clerk of the territorial legislature and continued to speculate on the sale of public lands.

=== Confrontation with Harrison ===
In August 1807, Jennings was appointed clerk of the Vincennes University board of trustees and began to be drawn into ongoing political disputes going on territory. The territorial governor, William Henry Harrison, was a member and president of the board. (Note: Harrison, who came from a well-connected political family in Virginia, had served as an officer in the Northwest Indian War and as a territorial delegate to Congress. Harrison later became a U.S. senator, ambassador, and president. See Gugin and St. Clair, pp. 18-26) As governor of the Indiana Territory, Harrison wielded considerable influence through his political appointments and veto powers. Jennings received the university appointment after General Washington Johnston resigned as clerk of the board following a dispute over Harrison's proposal to ban the French residents of Vincennes from using the university's commons. The board defeated Harrison's proposal, but Johnston resigned as its clerk and Jennings was selected as his replacement over Henry Hurst, one of Harrison's loyal supporters. Harrison was outraged and promptly resigned from the board, but later reconsidered his decision. In September 1807, Harrison was easily reelected to the board and selected as its president. In the meantime, Johnston wrote a pamphlet describing the board's proceedings, which Jennings certified without the board's knowledge or approval. Jennings further angered Harrison when he attempted to secure a clerkship in the territorial legislature. Jennings's opponent for the clerkship was the anti-slavery candidate Davis Floyd, an enemy of Harrison. After Jennings dropped out of the race, Floyd was selected for the position and became an important political ally to Jennings. In April 1808, with Harrison reelected as president of the Vincennes University board, a commission was appointed to investigate Jennings's conduct. The committee's inquiry concerned Jennings's certification of Johnston's pamphlet dealing with board proceedings without their knowledge. The incident led to Jennings's resignation in 1808 and created a considerable amount of animosity between the two that prevailed for many years. (Note: The incident is significant given that Jennings and Harrison were political opponents later in Jennings's career, but records do not exist that describe their relationship when Jennings lived in Vincennes. The board inquiry appears to be based on Jennings's certification of the pamphlet dealing with board proceedings rather than political opposition. See Riker, p. 227.)

By March 1808, Jennings believed that his future in the Harrison-dominated western part of the territory was bleak. By November he had left Vincennes and moved to Jeffersonville, in Clark County, Indiana Territory, before settling in nearby Charlestown. Jennings may have believed his political future would have more success in the eastern part of the territory. Settlements in the southeast and eastern portion of the territory opposed slavery and Harrison's aristocratic manner, which were similar to Jennings's beliefs, while the western portion of the territory and Vincennes area remained proslavery. (Note: When the Indiana Territory was organized in 1800 the people living in the territory favored slavery; however, after it was divided into the Indiana and Illinois territories in 1809 and the Illinois group was removed, the Indiana Territory's remaining proslavery element became much smaller. See Riker, pp. 288-289.) Although petitions to allow slavery were received before the formation of the Indiana Territory, the issue attracted widespread attention in 1807 when Harrison and his supporters in the territorial legislature revived efforts to allow slavery in the territory. (Note: Slavery had long existed in the region. It was practiced by the French in the Illinois Country and the area around Vincennes, the center of the pro-slavery establishment in the territory, and by the American settlers from Virginia and the upland South. Although slavery was prohibited throughout the territory, as outlined in the Northwest Ordinance of 1787, it was not enforced. William Henry Harrison, a Virginian by birth, owned and traded in slaves while serving as territorial governor, as did others who lived in the Indiana Territory. An indentured servant system with long terms of service was created to override the ordinance's statute that prohibited slavery. See Mills, pp. 54, 56.) Jennings and his supporters who opposed slavery wrote writing articles appearing in the Vincennes Western Sun newspaper attacking Harrison's administration, its pro-slavery sentiments, and aristocratic policies.

In 1808, when Congressman Benjamin Parke resigned from office, Harrison ordered a special election to fill the vacancy. Jennings entered the race against Harrison's candidate, Thomas Randolph, the attorney general for the territory, and John Johnson, a Vincennes native who had the support of the antislavery group. Randolph promised not to introduce slavery into the territory unless the majority of his constituents agreed, while Johnson remained silent on the issue. Jennings, an antislavery candidate from the eastern portion of the territory, rode from settlement to settlement to give speeches against slavery. Jennings spoke against what he believed to be Randolph's aristocratic tendencies, ties to Harrison's territorial government, and the issue of slavery in the territory. Jennings found his greatest support among the growing Quaker community in the eastern part of the territory.

On November 27, 1809, Jennings was elected as a delegate to the Eleventh Congress. The election was close. Jennings beat Randolph, 428 votes to 402, with Johnson taking 81 votes. Randolph challenged the election results and traveled to Washington D.C. to take his case to the U.S. House of Representatives. Randolph claimed that election officials in Dearborn County did not follow proper procedures for certifying ninety-one votes in the county's seventh district and argued that the votes should be deducted from the vote totals. Once discarded, the revised totals would make Randolph the winner. A House committee took up the case, issued a resolution in Randolph's favor, and recommended that a new election be held. Randolph immediately left for the Indiana Territory to launch a new campaign for the seat, but the House defeated the committee's recommendation by an 83 to 30 vote margin and Jennings was permitted to take his seat. As a territorial delegate in Congress, Jennings learned the legislative process, served on House committees, introduced legislation, debated issues, and continued his ongoing crusade against Governor Harrison. Jennings did not play a major role in congressional discussions, but he did make an effort to represent the interests of his constituents. He was reelected in 1811, 1812, and 1814.

=== Courtship and marriage ===
During his first session in Congress, Jennings had a small portrait of himself made, which he later gave to Ann Gilmore Hay, the daughter of a prominent Charlestown politician, whom he had recently begun courting. (Note: The painting is the only known authentic portrait of Jennings. Both of Jennings's official portraits are based his 1809 portrait. See Mills, p. 133.) Hay was born in Harrodsburg, Kentucky, in 1792. Her family moved to Clark County in Indiana Territory, and settled in Charlestown. Jennings first met her when he was campaigning for Congress in 1809. After his first session in Congress ended, Jennings returned to Indiana Territory and married eighteen-year-old Ann on August 8, 1811. Ann's father had just died leaving her with no family or means of support. Following his reelection to Congress in 1811, the couple returned to Washington, where she remained briefly, before traveling to Pennsylvania to live with Jennings's sister, Ann Mitchell, for the remainder of the session. Jennings's wife suffered from ill health, which deteriorated after he became governor of Indiana in 1816, and she died after a protracted illness in 1826. Later that year Jennings married Clarissa Barbee, who had come from Kentucky to teach at the Charlestown seminary. Jennings had no children from either marriage.

== Congressman ==
=== Battle with Harrison ===
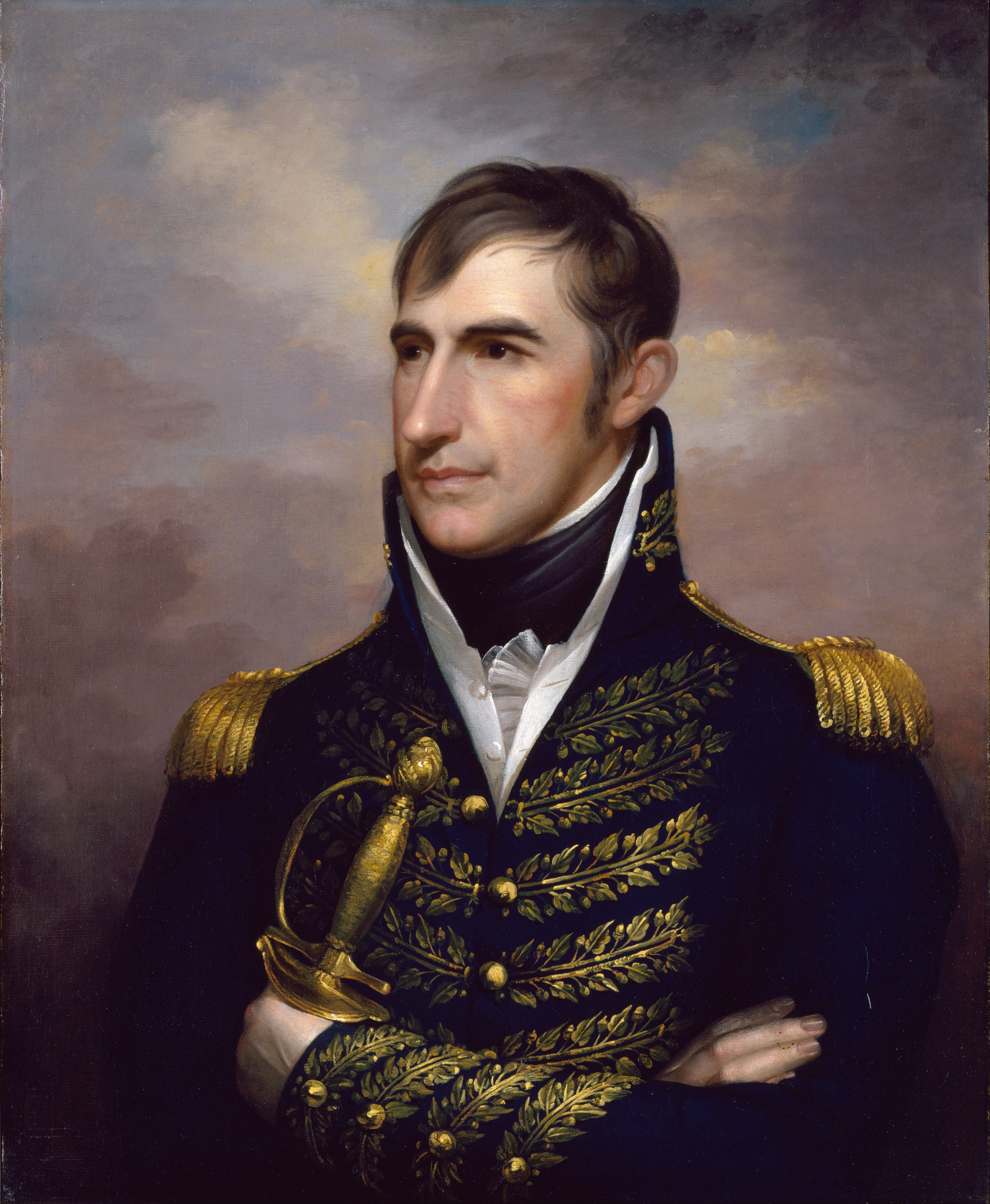
Portrait of General William Henry Harrison in military uniform during the War of 1812

Angered over his electoral loss, Randolph harangued anti-Harrison supporters, even challenging one to a duel. He was stabbed three times, but recovered and challenged Jennings in his bid for reelection in 1810. Harrison came out to personally stump on Randolph's behalf. Jennings focused on the slavery issue and tied Randolph to Harrison's continued attempts to legalize the institution. The congressional election coincided with the first popular election of delegates to the territorial legislature. In 1809, a year prior to the election, the territory's pro-slavery faction suffered a significant setback when Illinois was separated from the Indiana Territory, cutting Harrison off from his supporters in the western portion of the territory. Harrison suggested that Jennings further expanded his political base by stumping among the disaffected French residents of the territory. Jennings's defeat of Randolph in 1810 repudiated Harrison's pro-slavery policies. Following his triumph in the election, Jennings's and his anti-slavery allies were successful in enacting a legislative agenda that limited the territorial governor's authority and repealed an 1805 act regarding indentured service.

In his first full term in Congress, Jennings stepped up his attacks on Harrison, accusing him of using his office for personal gain, of taking part in questionable land speculation deals, and needlessly raising tensions with the Native American tribes on the frontier. Jennings presented a congressional resolution that intended to reduce Harrison's authority to make political appointments and opposed his policy of purchasing lands from the Indians. When Harrison was up for reappointment as territorial governor in 1810, Jennings sent a scathing letter to President James Madison that argued against his reappointment. Harrison's allies in Washington argued on his behalf and aided in securing his reappointment.

After hostilities broke out on the frontier between the Americans and the native tribes, culminating in the Battle of Tippecanoe in November 1811, Jennings successfully promoted passage of a bill to grant compensation to veterans of the battle and to give pensions for five years to the widows and orphans of those who were killed. Privately, Jennings lamented the battle, while his friends in the territory faulted Harrison for agitating the situation and causing the needless loss of life. As calls for war with Great Britain increased, Jennings was not among the war hawks, but ultimately accepted the arrival of the War of 1812. Early in the war, Harrison was commissioned as a military general and dispatched to defend the frontier and invade Canada, which caused him to resign from his post as territorial governor in 1812. Prior to Harrison's resignation, Jennings and his allies moved quickly to take advantage of the situation and initiated efforts to weaken the governor's authority. In 1811, the territorial legislature voted to move the capital away from Vincennes, a pro-Harrison stronghold, and began a shift in political power from the territorial governor to the delegates in the territorial legislature and its elected officials. John Gibson, the elderly, acting governor, whose territorial duties largely dealt with military affairs, did not challenge the territorial legislature. When Harrison's successor, Thomas Posey, was confirmed on March 3, 1813, Jennings's party in the territorial legislature had become entrenched and began to advance their request for statehood.

Jennings ran for reelection to Congress in 1811 against another pro-slavery candidate, Waller Taylor. The campaign was the most divisive in Jennings's career. Taylor derided Jennings as a "pitiful coward" and went so far as to challenge Jennings to a duel, but he refused. Jennings ran on the slavery issue again, fielding his new motto, "No slavery in Indiana". Jennings's supporters tied Taylor, a territorial judge, to the pro-slavery movement. Jennings easily won reelection, thanks to an expanding base of support that included the growing community of Harmonists. (Note: According to historian Randy Mills, the Harmonists began to arrive in the territory 1814 and quickly became a political factor in elections because they voted as a block under the direction of their leader, George Rapp. Jennings made an effort to gain Rapp's political support, especially after Jennings became governor. See Mills, pp. 184-185.) Following his reelection, Jennings developed jaundice, an illness often caused by alcoholism, but he recovered. During his third term in Congress, Jennings began advocating that statehood be granted to Indiana, but held off formally introducing legislation until the end of the War of 1812. Jennings ran against Elijah Sparks in his 1814 reelection campaign and easily won.

=== Push for statehood ===
By 1815 Jennings and the territorial legislature were ready to embark on a course for statehood. In December 1815, Jennings's introduced a petition from the territorial legislature to Congress that requested statehood for Indiana. The 1815 census showed the territory had a population exceeding 63,000, more than the minimum requirement for statehood under the Northwest Ordinance of 1787. The House began a debate on the measure and passed the Enabling Act on April 11, 1816. The act granted Indiana the right to form a government and elect delegates to a constitutional convention that would create a state constitution. The territorial governor, Thomas Posey, expressed concern that the territory was too under-populated to provide sufficient tax revenue to fund a state government. In a letter to President Madison, he recommended that the president veto the bill and delay statehood for another three years, which would allow him to finish his term as governor. Madison signed the bill, ignoring Posey's plea.

Dennis Pennington, a leading member of the territorial legislature, was able to secure the election of many anti-slavery delegates to the constitutional convention. Jennings was a delegate from Clark County. At the convention, held in June 1816 in the new territorial capital of Corydon, Jennings was elected president of the assembly, which permitted him to appoint the convention's committee chairmen. Although the delegates drafted a new constitution for Indiana, the majority of the content was copied from other state constitutions, most notably Ohio and Kentucky.

A few items were new and unique to Indiana. Slavery, which was already prohibited in territorial legislation, was banned in the Indiana constitution; however, contracts for indentured servants, if they were already in existence, were preserved. The new state government, divided into legislative, executive, and judicial branches, gave the governor limited powers and concentrated authority in the hands of the Indiana General Assembly and county officials. Shortly after the convention, Jennings publicly announced his candidacy for governor.

== Governor ==
=== Campaign and election ===
At the state convention in June 1816, Jennings may have informed some of the delegates that he intended to run for governor and by early July 1816 he had publicly announced his candidacy. Thomas Posey, Indiana's last territorial governor, was Jennings's opponent. Posey announced his own candidacy for governor prior to the convention's adjournment on June 29, 1816. With just five weeks before the August 5 election, there was little active campaigning. Posey, who thought Indiana statehood was premature, was not a popular candidate and suffered from health issues. Jennings won by a large majority, 5,211 votes to 3,934. Most of Jennings's votes probably came from the eastern portion of the state, where his support was particularly strong, while Posey's probably came from the western portion. Jennings moved to the new state capital at Corydon, where he served the duration of his term as governor.

Jennings's salary as governor, which was the highest for an elected official in the state, was $1,000. Under the constitution, the governor served a three-year term and was prohibited from serving more than six years in a nine-year period. (Note: Jennings was one of five Indiana governors under this version of the state constitution who served more than three years. See Gugin and St. Clair, p. 1.) Jennings's agenda called for establishing court proceedings to secure justice, organizing a state-funded educational systems, creating a state banking system, preventing unlawful seizure and enslavement of free blacks, organizing a state library, and planning internal improvements. His efforts had limited success, due, in part, to the state's limited financial resources and Jennings's limited powers as governor.

Jennings strongly condemned slavery in his inauguration speech and as governor, he refined his stance on the institution. On November 7, 1816, Jennings encouraged the state legislature to enact personal liberty laws to prevent "unlawful attempts to seize and carry into bondage persons of color legally entitled to their freedom" while preventing "those who rightfully owe service to the citizens of any other State or Territory, from seeking, within the limits of this state, a refuge from the possession of their lawful owners." In 1817, Jennings acknowledged a moderation of his earlier position regarding fugitive slaves by claiming it was needed to "preserve harmony" among the states. Jennings agreed to allow citizens "the means of reclaiming any slave escaping to this State that may rightfully belong to them ... with as little delay as possible" after citizens of Kentucky had difficulty reclaiming their slaves who had escaped to Indiana.

=== Internal improvements ===
In 1818, Jennings began promoting a large-scale plan for internal improvements in the state. Most of the projects were directed toward construction of roads, canals, and other projects to enhance the commercial appeal and economic viability of the state. During Jennings's second term the state government continued to support public improvements, with new road construction and expanded settlement into central Indiana. After Indianapolis became the site for the state's permanent capital in 1821 and new settlers arrived in the area, the Indiana General Assembly appropriated $100,000 (~$3.14 million in 2024) for new road construction and improvements to some of the more important routes, but it was considerably short of the amount needed. (Note: The state granted the largest improvement project, the Indiana Canal Company, first chartered in 1805, more than $1.5 million over several years to complete a canal on the Ohio River. The project was completed, after several delays, in 1831. See Dunn, pp. 382-385)

The state experienced budget shortages because of low tax revenues, which forced Jennings to pursue other means of financing the projects. The main sources of funds came from issuing government bonds to the state bank and sales of public lands. The state's spending and borrowing led to short-term budget problems, but despite early setbacks (poor access to capital eventually halted improvement programs and caused the Indiana Canal Company to fold because of lack of funds), the infrastructure improvements initiated by Jennings attracted new settlers to the state. By 1810 the Indiana Territory's population within the boundaries of the new state was 24, 520. In the decades following his governorship, Indiana's population grew from sixty-five thousand in 1816 to 147,178 in 1820 and surpassed one million by 1850.

In his first inaugural speech in August 1816, Jennings called attention to the need for an educational plan. In his 1817 annual message to the state legislature, he encouraged the establishment of a free, state-funded education system, as called for in the state constitution, but few of the state's citizens were willing to impose taxes to fund public schools. The state legislature believed priority should be given to creating government infrastructure. Lack of public funds postponed creation of a state library system until Governor James B. Ray's administration in 1826.

From the beginning the state's banking institutions were closely tied to the state government's fiscal affairs, made even more challenging due to the state's "extremely limited economic and population base", the economic depression of the late teens and early twenties, a lack of experience in banking on the part of state politicians and citizens, and other factors. "Indiana banking rested on shaky foundation even in the prosperous years preceding the Panic of 1819." To remedy the problem, Jennings signed legislation in 1817 to create the First State Bank of Indiana by converting the Bank of Vincennes, established under a territorial charter in 1814, into the new bank's main headquarters and established three new branches at Corydon, Brookville, and Vevay. The First State Bank soon became a depository of federal funds and was involved in land speculation. The Farmers and Mechanics Bank of Madison, established in 1814, chose to remain separate from the state bank under a territorial charter that was valid until 1835.

When state expenditures exceeded its revenues, Jennings preferred to secure the state's debts with bank loans to cover the shortfall rather than issuing treasury notes. Although taxes were levied and the state borrowed from the First State Bank of Indiana, the state's fiscal status remained bleak, worsened by the economic depression of 1819. Around 1820 federal deposits at the First State Bank were suspended and the bank's notes were no longer accepted for purchases from federal land offices.

Numerous reports of corruption at the Bank of Vincennes and the collapse of land values, brought on by the panic of 1819, put the bank in further financial distress. By 1821, the bank was insolvent. In June 1822 the Knox County circuit court declared the First State Bank had forfeited its charter. In November 1823 the Indiana Supreme Court upheld the termination of the bank's charter and concluded that the First State Bank had "embezzled" $250,000 of federal deposits, issued more paper than it could redeem, had debt exceeding the limited allowed under its charter, established more branches than its capital and specie could support, paid shareholders large dividends, and took steps to dissolve without paying debts owed.

For several years after the First State Bank's failure, Indiana citizens depended on the Bank of the United States, with a branch in Louisville, and the Farmers and Mechanics Bank of Madison for financial services. Farmers and Mechanics Banks fared better than the First State Bank of Indiana, but its charter expired on January 1, 1835, and its paper passed at depreciated rates for several years. Jennings was criticized for not monitoring the state's banks more carefully and investigating bank officials for potential wrongdoing.

Most of Jennings second term was spent grappling with the state's continuing financial difficulties. When tax revenues and land sales remained low, the state's revenue was not sufficient to repay the bonds it used to finance internal improvements. The Indiana General Assembly was forced to significantly depreciate the value of its bonds, harming the state's credit and making it difficult to secure new loans.

During his tenure as governor, Jennings nominated three candidates to the Indiana Supreme Court: John Johnson, James Scott, and Jesse Lynch Holman. All three were quickly confirmed by the state legislature.

=== Treaty of St. Mary's ===
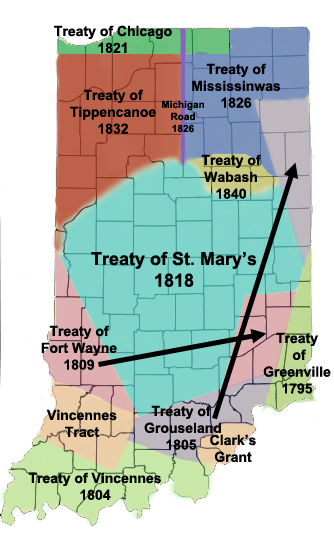
Map showing treaties negotiated by Jennings

In late 1818, Jennings was appointed as a federal commissioner, along with Lewis Cass and Benjamin Parke, to negotiate a treaty with the Native Americans (Potawatomi, Wea, Miami, and Delaware), who lived in the northern and central parts of Indiana. The Treaty of St. Mary's allowed the State of Indiana to purchase millions of acres of land north of an 1809 treaty line and extending west to the Wabash River and two more parcels of land, which opened most of central Indiana to American settlement. The appointment created a crisis in Jennings's political career. Because the state constitution prohibited a person from holding a federal government position while exercising duties as the state's governor, Jennings's political enemies seized the opportunity to force him from office by arguing that he had vacated the governor's office when he accepted the federal appointment.

Lieutenant Governor Christopher Harrison claimed that Jennings had "abandoned" his elected office and took over as the state's acting governor in Jennings's absence. In the meantime the Indiana House of Representatives launched an investigation. When Jennings learned of the situation, he was "mortified" that his actions were being questioned and burned the documents he received from the federal government that related to his assignment. The legislature called Jennings and Harrison to appear for questioning; however, Jennings declined, stating the assembly did not have the authority to interrogate him, and Harrison refused to appear unless the assembly recognized him as the acting governor. Because neither of the two men would meet with the legislature, the assembly demanded copies of the documents that Jennings received from the federal government to prove he was not acting as its agent. Jennings responded:

If I were in possession of any public documents calculated to advance the public interest, it would give me pleasure to furnish them, and I shall at all times be prepared to afford you any information which the constitution or laws of the State may require. ... If the difficulty, real or supposed, has grown out of the circumstances of my having been connected with the negotiation at St Mary's, I feel it my duty to state to the committee that I acted from an entire conviction of its propriety and an anxious desire, on my part, to promote the welfare and accomplish the wishes of the whole people of the State in assisting to add a large and fertile tract of country to that which we already possess.

The legislature summoned everyone in the surrounding area who had any knowledge of the events at Saint Mary's, but found that no one was certain of Jennings's role in the commission. After a short debate, the House passed a resolution, voting 15 to 13, to recognize Jennings as governor and dropped it proceedings against him. (Note: The House committee investigation concluded Jennings had accepted a federal commission, but "was not prepared to say what its effect might be." See Carmony, p. 27.) The House votes opposing Jennings came largely from the state's western counties. Harrison was outraged by the decision and resigned as lieutenant governor.

In 1819 Harrison ran against Jennings in his reelection bid. Jennings won the election by a large majority, 11,256 votes to Harrison's 2,008. Jennings's win by a three-to-one margin suggests he remained a popular politician and the state's voters were not overly concerned by attacks on the governor's character.

=== Personal financial problems ===
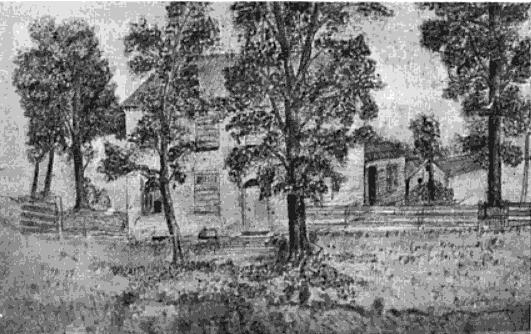
Drawing of the home of Jonathan Jennings while he lived in Corydon, the first official governor's residence

Jennings's personal finances suffered from the panic of 1819, while the Indiana governorship continued to increase his financial burden. Jennings was never able to recover from his debts. One historian suggests that Jennings's financial situation may arisen from the expenses incurred during his political campaigns, his long-time service in state government, and being too busy to adequately manage his farm. Jennings and his wife frequently entertained visitors, legislators, and other dignitaries at their Corydon home. At a high-profile dinner in 1819, he hosted President James Monroe and General Andrew Jackson at a dinner held in their honor in Jeffersonville, when the two leaders were making a tour of the frontier states. In 1822 Jennings solicited a $1,000 (~$29,664 in 2024) personal loan from the Harmonists in a letter to his political ally, George Rapp, but his request was denied. Jennings was able to secure personal loans from friends by granting mortgages on his land. Earlier in his career as a land speculator at Vincennes, when land prices decreased significantly, he was forced to sell several tracts of land at a loss.

By the late 1820s, Jennings was critically short of cash. He depended on income from political office to pay his expenses. His farm was not likely to provide sufficient financial support. Because the thirty-eight-year-old Jennings was prohibited by law from running for reelection to a third term as Indiana governor in 1823, he was forced to consider other political options. (Note: At that time Jennings was ineligible for re-election because the state constitution restricted the governor's term of service to a maximum of six years in a period of nine and Jennings had already served two three-year terms as governor. See Carmony, pp. 80-81.) Jennings decided to return to Congress.

=== Return to Congress ===
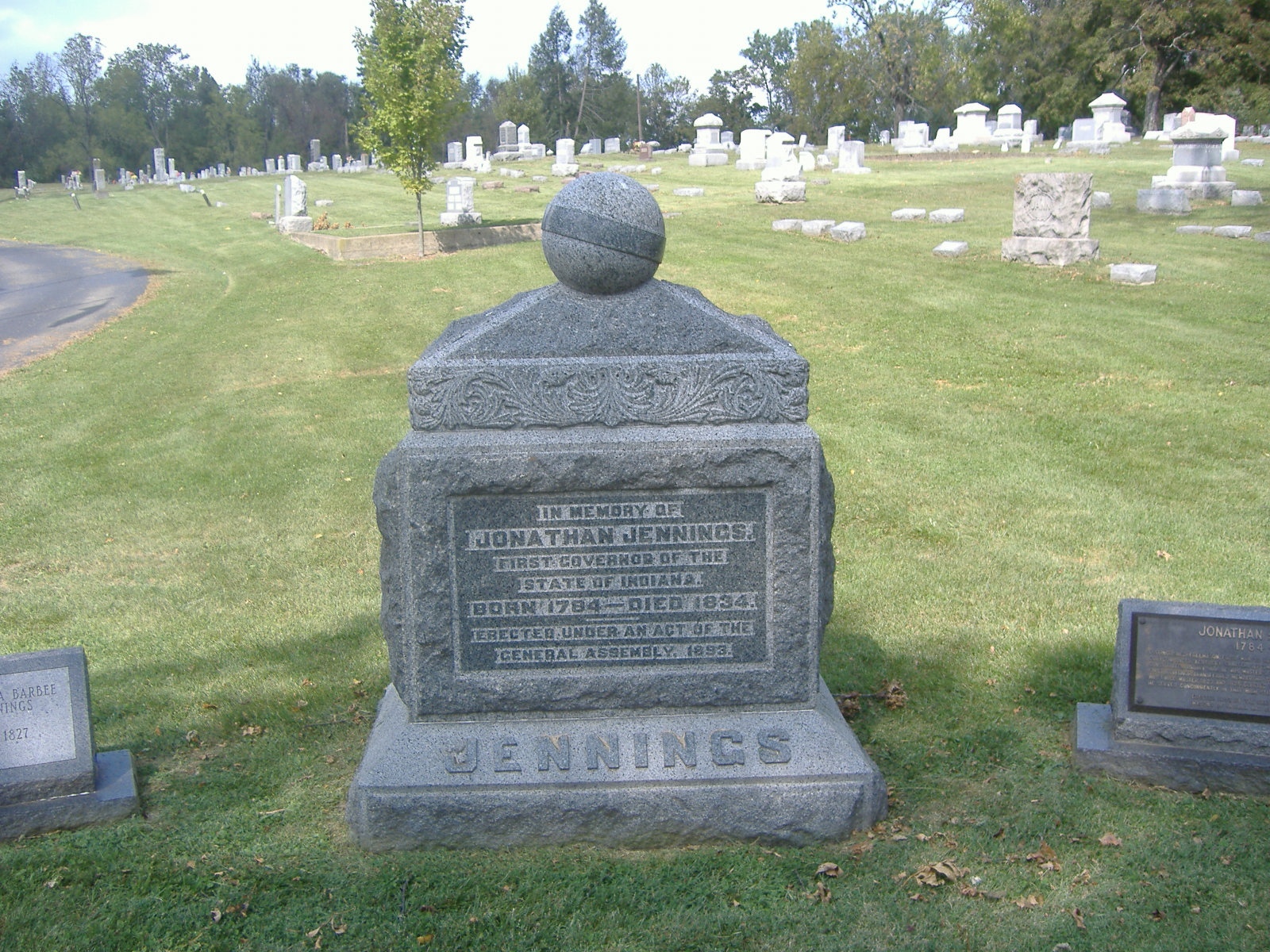
Burial site of Jennings in the Charlestown Cemetery.

In September 1822, shortly before his second term as governor expired, Jennings became a candidate for Congress after William Hendricks resigned his seat to run for Indiana governor. (Note: Historians have debated the idea that Jennings made an arrangement with Hendricks. In exchange for Jennings's support of Hendricks for the governorship, Hendricks would resign from Congress and support Jennings in the special election for the vacant congressional seat. See Mills, pp. 199-200) A special election was held on August 5, 1822, to fill Hendricks's vacant seat in Congress. At the same time, the state's increased population gave Indiana three congressional seats. A regular congressional election was held on the same day to elect three Indiana congressmen. Jennings and Davis Floyd were the principal candidates in the special election, which Jennings won. In the regular election to fill the seat for Indiana's Second Congressional District, Jennings easily won, defeating James Scott by a wide margin. Jennings became a Democratic-Republican to the 17th Congress and Lieutenant Governor Ratliff Boon succeeded him as governor. Hendricks ran unopposed and was subsequently elected as governor to succeed Boon. Jennings won reelection to Congress and represented Indiana's Second District until in 1830. He became a Jacksonian Republican in the 18th Congress, but switched his allegiance, becoming an Adams Republican in the 19th and 20th Congresses, and then aligned with the Anti-Jacksonians in the 21st Congress.

Jennings continued to promote internal infrastructure improvements throughout his term in Congress. He introduced legislation to build more forts in the northwest, to grant federal funding for improvement projects in Indiana and Ohio, and led the debate in support of using federal funds to build the nations longest canal, Wabash and Erie Canal, through Indiana. He introduced a legislative amendment that made a provision to locate and survey the National Road to the west, toward the Mississippi River, so the people living in Indiana and Illinois would have some assurance that the road's large federal appropriation would benefit them directly. Jennings helped secure appropriation of funds to survey the Wabash River and make it more accessible to year-round steamboat travel.

In his reelection as the Second District congressman, Jennings supported tariff protection and internal improvements and vowed to support the presidential candidate that his constituents preferred if the election went to the House to decide the winner. Jennings won reelection to Congress in a close race, beating Jeremiah Sullivan of Madison. In the presidential election of 1824, American political parties organized around three candidates: Andrew Jackson running against John Quincy Adams and Henry Clay. Jennings favored Adams, and later, Clay; however, when the contested presidential election passed to the House in 1825, Jennings voted with the majority and gave his political support to Jackson, but he was defeated in the House and Adams became president. (Note: Indiana's popular and electoral votes supported Jackson. Jennings may have used this information to decide his vote in Congress. See Riker, p. 236.) Indiana voters who supported Jackson hoped for a victory in the next election. (Note: In 1826, when William Henry Harrison returned to Indiana to stump for Adams, Jennings and Harrison found themselves on the same side. The two men toured the state together, endorsing Adams, and gave speeches that suggested they had reconciled their political differences and ended their feud. See Mills, p. 213)

Jennings, seeking to advance his political career, ran for the Senate twice, but was defeated in both attempts. In 1825, he was a senate candidate at a time when the Indiana General Assembly elected the state's senators to Congress. On the first ballot Isaac Blackford came in first, the incumbent governor, William Hendricks, came in second, and Jennings was third. On the fourth ballot Hendricks won the senate seat. In his second attempt, Jennings lost to James Noble.

Jennings's wife died in 1826 after a protected illness; the couple had no children. Jennings was deeply saddened by her loss and began to drink liquor more heavily. Later that year he married Clarissa Barbee, but his drinking condition only worsened and he was frequently inebriated.

While serving in Congress, Jennings's health continued to decline as he struggled with alcohol addiction and suffered from severe rheumatism. In 1827, ceiling plaster from Jennings's Washington D.C. boarding room fell on his head, severely injuring him, and ill health limited his ability to visit his constituents, but he continued to remain a popular politician in Indiana. In the congressional election of 1826, Jennings ran unopposed. He won reelection in 1828, soundly defeating his opponent, Indiana's lieutenant governor, John H. Thompson. Jennings did not publicly favor a presidential candidate and won the Second District seat with support from voters who favored Jackson and Adams. During Jennings's final term in office House journals show that he introduced no legislation, was frequently not present to vote on matters, and only once delivered a speech. Jennings's friends, led by Senator John Tipton, took note of his situation and took action to block Jennings's reelection bid when his drinking became a political liability. John Carr, anti-Jackson man, opposed Jennings in a six-way race for the congressional seat and won the election. Tipton had arranged for others to enter the race and divide Jennings's supporters. Jennings left office on March 3, 1831.

== Later years ==
Jennings was elected as the fifth Grand Master of Free & Accepted Masons in Indiana. He was made a Master Mason in Pisgah Lodge No. 45, Corydon (1817) under its original Kentucky charter; he later affiliated with Blazing Star Lodge No. 3, Charlestown. He was twice-elected Grand Master of the Grand Lodge of Indiana, serving in 1824 and 1825. He declined reelection in 1825.

=== Retirement ===
Jennings retired with his wife, Clarissa, to his home in Charlestown. Tipton may have felt it had been mistake to force Jennings out of public service and hoped that work would force him to give up alcohol. In 1831 Tipton secured Jennings an appointment to negotiate a treaty with native tribes in northern Indiana. Jennings attended the negotiations of the Treaty of Tippecanoe, but the delegation failed in their attempt. Afterwards, Jennings returned to his farm, where his health steadily declined. He continued drinking alcohol, spending considerable time at a local tavern, and was frequently discovered sleeping in streets or in roadside ditches. (Note: In the early 1830s Jennings made a pledge to stop drinking, but was he was unable to remain sober for long. See Mills, p. 222.) Jenning's alcoholism worsened to the point where he was no longer able to tend his farm. Without a steady income, Jennings's creditors began moving to seize his estate. In 1832, Tipton acquired the mortgage on Jennings's farm and enlisted the help of a local financier, James Lanier, to acquire the debts on Jennings's other holdings. (Note: Jennings owed more than a thousand dollars on his mortgaged farm. See Mills, pp. 226-227) Tipton allowed Jennings to remain on his mortgaged farm for the remainder of Jennings's life and encouraged Lanier to grant the same permission.

Jennings died of a heart attack, most likely brought on by another bout with jaundice, on July 26, 1834, at his farm near Charlestown. He was fifty years old. Jennings was buried after a brief ceremony in an unmarked grave. His estate lacked the funds to purchase a headstone. Jennings's creditors, many of whom were his neighbors, were left unpaid and disgruntled. Following Jennings's death, Tipton sold the Jennings farm to Joseph Carr and gave Jennings's widow a $100 gift from the proceeds.

== Legacy ==
=== Memorials ===
In the late nineteenth century, several attempts were made to erect a monument honoring Jennings's public service. On three separate occasions, in 1861, 1869 and 1889, petitions were brought before the Indiana General Assembly to erect a marker for Jennings's grave, but each attempt failed. In 1893 the state legislature finally granted the petition to erect a monument in his honor. Around the same time, after Jennings's unmarked gravesite was independently verified by three witnesses to his burial, his body was exhumed and reinterred at a new site at the Charlestown Cemetery. (Note: Jennings's original burial site would have been forgotten if a group of school children who attended his funeral and were the only witnesses who were still living had not been able to identify its location. See Mills, p. 229.)

Jonathan Jennings Elementary School in Charlestown and Jennings County are both named in his honor. Indiana celebrated its Bicentennial in 2016 and as part of the year-long celebration, the Indiana General Assembly passed House Concurrent Resolution 57 on March 2, 2016, naming Interstate 65 through Clark County the Governor Jonathan Jennings Memorial Highway in his memory.

On August 10, 2016, the 23.6 mile stretch of Interstate 65 was dedicated at a ceremony held at Henryville High School in Henryville before the official highway signs were installed.

=== Political impact ===
Historians have offered varied interpretations of Jennings's life and his impact on the development of Indiana. The state's early historians, William Wesley Woollen and Jacob Piatt Dunn Jr., wrote of Jennings in an almost mythical manner, focusing on the strong positive leadership he provided Indiana in its formative years. Dunn referred to Jennings as the "young Hercules", praising his crusade against Harrison and slavery. Woolen's assessment was also positive: "Indiana owes him a debt more than she can compute." During the prohibition era in the early twentieth century, historians Logan Esarey and Arthur Blythe were more critical of Jennings. Esarey, who wrote about Jennings during the height of Prohibition, when attitudes towards alcohol consumption was particularly harsh, was highly critical of Jennings's alcoholism and destitution. Blythe described Jennings's abilities as "mediocre." Esarey argued that Jennings "took no decisive stand" on the important issues and dismissed his importance and impact on Indiana, saying the legislature and its leading men set the tone of the era. In 1954, John Barnhart and Donald Carmony described Jennings as a "shrewd politician rather than a statesman", whose leadership was "not evident" at the 1816 convention. Carmony argued that Jennings's "intemperance and poverty, should not obscure his significant contributions as territorial delegate to Congress, president of the Corydon Constitutional Convention, first state governor, and congressman."

Modern historians, Howard Peckham, Randy Mills, Andrew R. L. Cayton, and Dorothy Riker, argue that Jennings's legacy may lie "somewhere between the two extremes" of Dunn's and Esarey's assessments. Mills agrees with Woollen that Indiana owes Jennings a debt of gratitude. Although Jennings's accomplishments were not extensive, he did a "commendable" job for his stewardship of a state in "transition to a more democratic form of government". Cayton describes Jennings as "ambitious", "passionate", "hot-tempered", and "moody". He argues that Jennings was a successful campaigner, but an "indifferent" statesman and governor who was "not very good at laying out an agenda and achieving its implementation".

Jennings believed in popular democracy, opposed slavery, and despised aristocrats, especially William Henry Harrison, for "trampling on the rights of his fellow Americans." His service as Indiana's governor and representative to Congress came at the end of one political era and the beginning of another, when governmental power and authority shifted from the governor and his patronage appointments to the state legislature and elected officials.

== Electoral history ==
=== Territorial delegate ===
}

Indiana Territory delegate to Congress, at-large, special election, 1809
Party	Candidate	Votes	%
Independent	Jonathan Jennings	429	46.9
Independent	Thomas Randolph	405	44.3
Independent	General Washington Johnston	81	8.7

}

Indiana Territory delegate to Congress, at-large, 1810
Party	Candidate	Votes	%
Independent	Jonathan Jennings (incumbent)	523	52.4
Independent	Thomas Randolph	476	47.6

}

Indiana Territory delegate to Congress, at-large, 1812
Party	Candidate	Votes	%
Independent	Jonathan Jennings (incumbent)	922	70.3
Independent	Waller Taylor	548	29.7

}

Indiana Territory delegate to Congress, at-large, 1814
Party	Candidate	Votes	%
Independent	Jonathan Jennings (incumbent)	1,802	69.2
Independent	Elijah Sparks	848	33.8

=== Gubernatorial elections ===
}

Indiana gubernatorial election, 1816
Party	Candidate	Votes	%
Democratic-Republican	Jonathan Jennings	5,211	57
Democratic-Republican	Thomas Posey	3,934	43

Indiana gubernatorial election, 1819
Party	Candidate	Votes	%
Democratic-Republican	Jonathan Jennings (incumbent)	11,256	84.9
Independent	Christopher Harrison	2,008	15.1
Independent	Samuel Carr	80	—

=== Indiana's 2nd Congressional district ===
}

Indiana's 2nd Congressional district, 1822
Party	Candidate	Votes	%
Democratic-Republican	Jonathan Jennings	15,129	100

}

Indiana's 2nd Congressional district, 1824
Party	Candidate	Votes	%
National Republican	Jonathan Jennings (incumbent)	4,680	53.2
National Republican	Jeremiah Sullivan	4,119	46.8

}

Indiana's 2nd Congressional district, 1826
Party	Candidate	Votes	%
National Republican	Jonathan Jennings (incumbent)	7,913	99.5

}

Indiana's 2nd Congressional district, 1828
Party	Candidate	Votes	%
Anti-Jacksonian	Jonathan Jennings (incumbent)	7,659	73.3
Independent	John H. Thompson	2,785	26.7

}

Indiana's 2nd Congressional district, 1830
Party	Candidate	Votes	%
Democratic-Republican	John Carr	4,854	32.8
Anti-Jacksonian	William W. Wick	4,605	31.1
Independent	James B. Ray	1,732	11.7
Anti-Jacksonian	Jonathan Jennings (incumbent)	1,680	11.3
Independent	John H. Thompson	1,486	10.0

== See also ==
- History of Indiana
- List of governors of Indiana

== Footnotes ==
U.S. House of Representatives
Preceded by Jesse B. Thomas	Delegate to the U.S. House of Representatives from the Indiana Territory's at-large congressional district 1809–1816	Succeeded by William Hendricks as U.S. Representative
Preceded by William Hendricks	Member of the U.S. House of Representatives from Indiana's 1st congressional district 1822–1823	Succeeded by Himself as Member from the 1st district
Preceded by Himself as Member from the at-large district	Member of the U.S. House of Representatives from Indiana's 1st congressional district 1823–1831	Succeeded by John Carr
Political offices
Preceded by Thomas Posey as Governor of the Indiana Territory	Governor of Indiana; 1816–1822	Succeeded by Ratliff Boon
Party political offices
First	Democratic-Republican nominee for Governor of Indiana; 1819	Succeeded by William Hendricks
