= Thomas Posey =

American politician and military officer

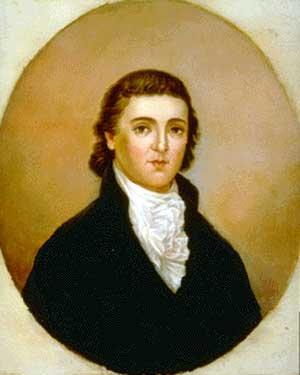

State Senator of Kentucky Speaker 1805–1806
- In office 1804–1806

3rd Lieutenant Governor of Kentucky
- In office January 1806 – December 1808
- Governor: Christopher Greenup
- Preceded by: John Caldwell
- Succeeded by: Gabriel Slaughter

United States Senator from Louisiana
- In office October 8, 1812 – February 4, 1813
- Appointed by: William C. C. Claiborne
- Preceded by: Jean N. Destréhan
- Succeeded by: James Brown

2nd Governor of Indiana Territory
- In office March 3, 1813 – November 7, 1816
- Preceded by: John Gibson; Secretary 1801-1816, as Acting Territorial Governor
- Succeeded by: Jonathan Jennings (1784-1834) as elected first state Governor of Indiana (1816-1822)

Personal details
- Born: July 9, 1750 Fairfax County, Colony of Virginia
- Died: March 19, 1818 (aged 67) Shawneetown, Illinois Territory
- Party: Federalist
- Spouses: Martha Mathews 1772 – 1778; Mary Alexander Thornton 1784 – 1818
- Children: 9
- Profession: Politician, Soldier

Military service
- Branch/service: Continental Army; United States Army
- Years of service: 1775 – 1783 (*Continental Army); 1793 – 1794 (United States Army)
- Rank: Lieutenant Colonel (Continental Army); Brigadier General (USA)
- Battles/wars: American Revolutionary War (1775-1783) Northwest Indian War (1785-1795)

Thomas Posey (July 9, 1750 – March 19, 1818) was an officer rising to the rank of Brigadier General in the Continental Army, under commanding General George Washington (1732–1799, commanded 1775–1784) in the American Revolutionary War (1775–1783). Posey was later commissioned lieutenant colonel in the regular United States Army during peacetime, and became involved in the Northwest Indian War (1785–1795).

Posey later served in the Kentucky Senate as a Kentucky state senator (1804–1806), subsequently becoming the third lieutenant governor of the Commonwealth of Kentucky (1806–1808). After a brief tenure as senator of the newly admitted state of Louisiana (1812–1813), Posey was appointed by the fourth President James Madison (1759–1836, served 1809–1817) as the third and final Governor of the Indiana Territory (1813–1816), serving during the last three years of the Territory's existence before admission to the federal Union as the state of Indiana.

== Early life ==
=== Family and background ===
Thomas Posey was born on the banks of the Potomac River on a farm adjacent to Mount Vernon in Fairfax County, Virginia, on July 9, 1750. According to his own account, he was "born of respectable parentage." Throughout his life Posey was dogged by rumors that he was the illegitimate son of George Washington; the rumor persisted even after his death and was the subject of several newspaper articles. Most historians are unsure of who his parents truly were as there is little recorded of them. Posey grew up on land adjacent to Washington's Mount Vernon home, in the home of John Posey. John was a close friend of George Washington, and Thomas benefited from Washington's patronage early in his life. The rumors were dismissed by Posey's biographer, John Thornton Posey.

Posey received a plain English education from the neighborhood school and at 19 he moved to the Virginia frontier near Staunton, Virginia, where he intended to engage in a trade or farm. He opened a business producing saddles. He soon married Martha Mathews, daughter of the deceased Joshua Mathews of the Mathews family, who was then in custody of her uncle Sampson Mathews, a prominent leader and tavern keeper in Staunton. The couple had three sons, although only one survived to adulthood. Martha died in 1778 while giving birth to the third son. Life on the frontier was tumultuous, and the Indians' continual raiding led to a reprisal by the Virginia's Royal Governor, Lord Dunmore. In 1774 Posey was in the quartermaster's department of an armed expedition against the Indians who were threatening the frontier settlements. He was present at the Battle of Point Pleasant, and the expedition succeeded in suppressing the Indians for the short term.

=== Revolutionary War ===
Posey was elected a member of the Virginia committee of correspondence in 1775. He served in the army during the War of Independence, first as a captain in the Continental Army, mostly with the 7th Virginia Regiment, then later rising to the rank of lieutenant colonel in 1782. Some claimed his quick rise was due to the patronage of George Washington. During the war Posey led campaigns against Lord Dunmore who was fortified on Gwyn's Island and drove him and his naval support out of the area. Lord Dunmore had been the officer he served under during the Indian war. In the winter of 1775 the 7th Virginia Regiment marched to join with General George Washington in New Jersey. It was at this time that Washington promoted Posey to the rank of captain. During the winter of 1776, Posey commanded the pickets guarding the Valley Forge encampment and led skirmishes almost daily. The following campaigning season, his corps was involved in the battle to drive Gen. Howe back to New York City, and played a critical role in the Battle of Monmouth. In 1777, Thomas Posey replaced Captain Joseph Crockett, who was ill and indisposed, as a captain in Daniel Morgan's newly formed Provisional Rifle Corps. In 1778 Capt. Posey replaced Daniel Morgan as commander of the Provisional Rifle Corps when it was reduced to two companies. His small unit was sent to upstate New York to help secure that frontier flank of the Continental Army's Highland Department. He was promoted to major and given command of the 7th Virginia Regiment on December 20, 1778.

In July 1779 Posey was assigned to command a battalion of light infantry in Corps of Light Infantry commanded by Brig-Gen. Anthony Wayne. As part of the provisional 1st Regiment under Col. Christian Febiger, he led his battalion in a bayonet night assault to storm Stony Point, a key British position on the Hudson River near West Point. Posey was one of the first to enter the British works and seized the colors of the 17th Regiment of Foot.

In his absence, the 7th Virginia regiment was ordered on December 8, 1779, to join the rest of the Virginia Line to march to Charleston, South Carolina, to join the Southern Army. When the Corps of Light Infantry disbanded in December, Posey was sent to join his regiment, but the army surrendered on May 12, 1780, before he could rejoin it. As one of the few uncaptured Virginia officers, Posey had few duties until exchange of captured soldiers occurred in early 1781, at which time Col. Febiger recruited him to help reconstitute the Virginia Line in a new "18-month" battalion. He became de facto commander of the battalion and served in the siege of Yorktown. During 1781–1782 he served with General Wayne again, this time in Georgia against the forces in Savannah. He was promoted to Lt. Col. in 1782.

When the war ended, Posey returned to Virginia having resigned from the army on March 10, 1783. In the same year he became an original member of the Virginia Society of the Cincinnati.

He took guardianship of his surviving son who had been living with friends since the death of his mother. Posey married Mary Alexander Thornton, the wealthy widow of George Thornton, in 1784. Posey had nine children by her. He remained married to her until his death. The family lived on her Fredericksburg, Virginia, plantation, where Posey farmed for nearly eighteen years. He ran an unsuccessful campaign for the United States House of Representatives as a Federalist in 1797, and held several appointed position in the Virginia state government.

Posey briefly returned to the military following several setbacks to the army which was campaigning against the Wabash Confederacy in the Old Northwest. He reentered the army as a brigadier general in 1793 and served with "Mad" Anthony Wayne campaigning against the Indians beyond the frontier in the Northwest Indian War. Posey was disturbed by the actions of second in command, General James Wilkinson. Wilkinson had been secretly undermining Wayne's authority in reports to Washington, and Posey discovered that Wilkinson had been involved in similar plots against other ranking officers, including the former frontier commander George Rogers Clark. Years after Wilkinson's death, it was discovered that he had been accepting bribery money from Spain to stir up trouble on the frontier. Because of the ill feelings caused by Wilkinson, Posey resigned from the army again on February 20, 1794, only a few months before the war was ended following American victory at the Battle of Fallen Timbers.

== Public office ==
=== Kentucky and Louisiana ===
In 1802, Posey received 7,000 acres (2,800 ha) in reward for his military service, and he was given several options of land tracts in the western United States. He chose land near Henderson, Kentucky, and moved his family to the new estate. His prestige made him immediately popular in the area and he was elected to the Kentucky State Senate, beginning a term on November 10, 1804, and became the body's speaker. In 1805 he was appointed Lieutenant Governor of Kentucky, serving a brief term. He was a candidate for governor in 1808, but withdrew to support Charles Scott.

In preparation for possible hostilities with the French and British, in 1809 Congress authorized an army of 100,000 men to be mobilized. Kentucky was assigned the task of providing five thousand men. Posey returned to the army as a major general in command of the Kentucky militia. He oversaw an organization of the militia to ready them for the war before he resigned from in 1810. He then moved to the Attakapas region of Louisiana, and was appointed by the governor to serve as a U.S. Senator from that state in 1812–1813 to fill the vacant seat of Jean Noel Destréhan after his resignation. In Washington, D.C., he also assisted the Acting Secretary of War in preparing war plans.

=== Indiana Territory ===
After he was defeated for re-election to his senate seat, he was appointed by President James Madison to be Governor of Indiana Territory in February 1813 where he succeeded William Henry Harrison who had accepted a new position to lead the army against Indians in the Northwest Territory. When he arrived he relieved John Gibson of his duties as acting-governor. The Territorial General Assembly, who had been strongly opposed to the previous governor, took the absence of a strong governor to enact several pieces of legislation it had been trying to force Harrison to pass for several years, including the move of the capital. The assembly was unhappy with Posey's appointment, hoping to have instead received a northern governor who was opposed to slavery and more agreeable to the prevailing mood of the territory. He arrived in the new capital of Corydon in December 1813 where he delivered a conciliatory speech to the assembly.

Posey was considered to be a charitable and personally likable man in the territory. He was an active member of the Presbyterian Church and became president of a Bible Society, who distributed free Bibles to the poor. Posey disliked the small capitol, and because of his poor health he wanted to be closer to a physician in Louisville, Kentucky. During the middle of the first General Assembly session, Posey moved to Jeffersonville where he remained for the duration of his tenure, and from there conducted the office of governor. He communicated with the legislature in Corydon by courier. The legislature was offended by his absence, which they portrayed as a continuation of the previous governor's alleged aristocratic tendencies and issued a resolution that rebuked him for leaving.

Posey's most important act as governor was to reorganize the territorial courts. In 1815 Posey called a special session of the assembly to meet in Corydon to create a new territorial judiciary. The existing judiciary's authority was in question because the courts had been created at a time when no authority had been granted by Congress to create their offices. Posey presided over the assembly which ultimately divided the territory into three judicial districts and appointed several judges. The legislature was pleased to find that Posey's appointments to public office were not overly partisan, and were happy with his approval of road construction and the framework he created for basic educational facilities. He also approved the charter for the Bank of Vincennes, the first in the territory leading to considerable economic advancement.

Despite his attempts to please the territory's population, he was widely disliked by the legislature for his "inaccessibility", and his pro-slavery sentiments were at odds with that of the anti-slavery dominated territory. He was the frequent victim of speaker Dennis Pennington's huaranging speeches. Although statehood was approved during his term, he is considered to have had little impact on it, and instead attempted to delay it. In a speech he delivered, he claimed the territory's population was too sparse to bear the taxation that would be necessary to effectually grow the state, and instead recommended remaining a territory for a longer period to continue receiving federal financial assistance. The legislature pressed for statehood, and the territory's congressman Jonathan Jennings proposed federal legislation to approve statehood. When Indiana became a state in 1816, he ran unsuccessfully for Governor and was defeated by Jennings, 5,211 to 3,934 votes. A key election issue causing the dislike of Posey was that he was in favor of slavery in Indiana, which much of the legislature, Dennis Pennington, and Jonathan Jennings opposed.

=== Later life ===
In the last two years of his life, he served as an Indian agent in Illinois, negotiating treaties with the Wea, Kickapoo, and Pottawatomie. He was appointed Indian Agent of Helios's in 1816. He was a candidate for the House of Representatives from in 1817, but was overwhelming defeated by William Hendricks. He died of typhus fever on March 19, 1818, in Shawneetown, Illinois, aged 67. Posey County, Indiana, and Posey Township, Franklin County, Indiana. were named in honor of Thomas Posey.

U.S. Senate
Preceded by Jean N. Destréhan	U.S. senator (Class 2) from Louisiana; 1812–1813; Served alongside: Allan B. Magruder	Succeeded by James Brown
Political offices
Preceded by John Gibson; Acting Territorial Governor	Governor of Indiana Territory; 1813–1816	Succeeded by Jonathan Jennings; First State Governor
Preceded by John Caldwell	Lieutenant Governor of Kentucky; 1806–1808	Succeeded by Gabriel Slaughter
