= 1st Indiana General Assembly =

1816 meeting of the Indiana General Assembly

2nd	→
- The Seal of Indiana

Overview
- Legislative body: Indiana General Assembly
- Jurisdiction: Indiana
- Election: 1816 general election

Senate
- Members: 10
- President pro tempore: John Paul

House of Representatives
- Members: 29
- Speaker: Isaac Blackford

Sessions
- 1st: November 4th, 1816 – January 3rd, 1817

The 1st Indiana General Assembly convened in a single session from November 4, 1816, until January 3, 1817.

== Officers ==
=== Senate ===
The Following individuals were the elected officers of the Indiana Senate during the 1st General Assembly Session:

President pro tempore
John Paul
Lieutenant Governor
Christopher Harrison
Secretary
G. R. C. Sullivan
Doorkeeper
Henry Batman

=== House of Representatives ===
The Following individuals were the elected officers of the Indiana House of Representatives during the 1st General Assembly Session:

Speaker of the House
Isaac Blackford

== Members ==
=== Senate ===
Members of the Indiana Senate for the 1st Indiana General Assembly:

District	Senator
Wayne County	Patrick Baird
Clark County	James Beggs
Franklin County	John Conner
Washington, Orange and Jackson Counties	John DePauw
Dearborn County	Ezra Ferris
Posey, Perry and Warrick Counties	Daniel Grass
Jefferson and Switzerland Counties	John Paul
Harrison County	Dennis Pennington
Knox County	William Polke
Gibson County	William Prince

=== House of Representatives ===
Members of the Indiana House of Representatives for the first Indiana General Assembly:

District	Representative
Clark County	Thomas Carr
Clark County	Benjamin Ferguson
Dearborn County	Amos Lane
Dearborn County	Erasmus Powell
Franklin County	James Brownlee
Franklin County	David Mount
Franklin County	George L. Murdock
Franklin County	James Noble
Gibson County	Edmund Hogan
Gibson County	John Johnson
Harrison County	John Boone
Harrison County	Davis Floyd
Harrison County	Jacob Zenor
Jackson County	William Graham
Jefferson County	Samuel Alexander
Jefferson County	Williamson Dunn
Knox County	Isaac Blackford
Knox County	Henry I. Mills
Knox County	Walter Wilson
Orange County	Jonathan Lindley
Perry County	Samuel Connor
Posey County	Dan Lynn
Switzerland County	John Dumont
Warrick County	Ratliff Boon
Washington County	John K. Graham
Washington County	Alexander Little
Washington County	Samuel Milroy
Wayne County	Joseph Holman
Wayne County	Ephraim Overman
Wayne County	John Scott

== See also ==
- List of Indiana General Assemblies
- List of speakers of the Indiana House of Representatives
- Politics of Indiana
- Elections in Indiana
- Historical outline of Indiana
