= 2nd Indiana General Assembly =

1817 meeting of the Indiana General Assembly

←	1st	3rd	→
- The Seal of Indiana

Overview
- Legislative body: Indiana General Assembly
- Jurisdiction: Indiana
- Election: 1817 general election

Senate
- Members: 10
- President pro tempore: John Paul

House of Representatives
- Members: 29
- Speaker: Amos Lane

Sessions
- 1st: December 1st, 1817 – January 29th, 1818

The 2nd Indiana General Assembly convened in a single session from December 1, 1817, until January 29, 1818.

== Officers ==
=== Senate ===
The Following individuals were the elected officers of the Indiana Senate during the 2nd General Assembly Session:

President pro tempore
John Paul
Lieutenant Governor
Christopher Harrison

=== House of Representatives ===
The Following individuals were the elected officers of the Indiana House of Representatives during the 2nd General Assembly Session:

Speaker of the House
Amos Lane

== Members ==
=== Senate ===
Members of the Indiana Senate for the 2nd Indiana General Assembly:

District (Note: Sources indicate that some constituencies changed during the term. The counties listed in the official roster are provided in the table.)	Senator
Wayne County	Patrick Baird
Clark County	James Beggs
Franklin County	John Conner
Washington, Orange, and Jackson Counties	John DePauw
Dearborn County	Ezra Ferris
Posey, Perry, and Warrick Counties	Daniel Grass
Jefferson and Switzerland Counties	John Paul
Harrison County	Dennis Pennington
Knox, Sullivan, and Daviess Counties	William Polke
Gibson and Pike Counties	Isaac Montgomery

=== House of Representatives ===
Members of the Indiana House of Representatives for the 2nd Indiana General Assembly:

District	Representative
Clark County	Charles Beggs
Clark County	Thomas Carr
Clark County	Benjamin Ferguson
Dearborn County	Amos Lane
Franklin County	John Bryson
Franklin County	James Snowden
Franklin County	Stephen Stevens
Gibson County	James Campbell
Gibson County	Richard Daniel
Harrison County	William D. Littell
Harrison County	James B. Slaughter
Harrison County	Jacob Zenor
Jackson County	William Graham
Jefferson County	Williamson Dunn
Jefferson County	Nathaniel Hunt
Knox County	Robert Buntin
Knox County	John McClure
Knox County	George R. C. Sullivan
Orange County	Samuel Chambers
Posey County	Samuel Connor
Posey County	Dan Lynn
Switzerland County	Ralph Cotton
Warrick County	Ratliff Boon
Washington County	Alexander Little
Washington County	Samuel Milroy
Wayne County	Robert Hill
Wayne County	Joseph Holman
Wayne County	John Scott

== See also ==
- List of Indiana General Assemblies
- List of speakers of the Indiana House of Representatives
- Politics of Indiana
- Elections in Indiana
- Historical outline of Indiana
