= 3rd Indiana General Assembly =

1817 meeting of the Indiana General Assembly

←	2nd	4th	→
- The Seal of Indiana

Overview
- Legislative body: Indiana General Assembly
- Jurisdiction: Indiana
- Election: 1818 general election

Senate
- Members: 10
- President pro tempore: John Paul

House of Representatives
- Members: 29
- Speaker: Williamson Dunn

Sessions
- 1st: December 7th, 1818 – January 2nd, 1819

The 3rd Indiana General Assembly convened in a single session from December 7, 1818, until January 2, 1819.

== Officers ==
=== Senate ===
The Following individuals were the elected officers of the Indiana Senate during the 2nd General Assembly Session:

President pro tempore
John Paul

=== House of Representatives ===
The Following individuals were the elected officers of the Indiana House of Representatives during the 2nd General Assembly Session:

Speaker of the House
Williamson Dunn

== Members ==
=== Senate ===
Members of the Indiana Senate for the 2nd Indiana General Assembly:

District	Senator
Wayne County	Patrick Baird
Clark County	James Beggs
Posey, Vanderburgh, Spencer and Warrick Counties	Ratliff Boon
Franklin County	John Conner
Washington, Jackson, Orange, Lawrence and Monroe Counties	John DePauw
Dearborn County	Ezra Ferris
Gibson, Pike and Dubois Counties	Isaac Montgomery
Jefferson and Switzerland Counties	John Paul
Harrison and Crawford Counties	Dennis Pennington
Knox, Sullivan, Daviess and Vigo Counties	William Polke

=== House of Representatives ===
Members of the Indiana House of Representatives for the 2nd Indiana General Assembly:

District	Representative
Clark County	Joseph Bartholomew
Clark County	Charles Beggs
Clark County	John H. Thompson
Dearborn County	Erasmus Powell
Dearborn County	John Watts
Franklin County	Allen Crisler
Franklin County	James Goudie
Franklin County	Jonathan McCarty
Gibson County	Richard Daniel
Gibson County	John Johnson
Harrison County	Harbin H. Moore
Harrison County	James B. Slaughter
Harrison County	William Thomasson
Jackson County	William Graham
Jefferson County	Williamson Dunn
Jefferson County	Nathaniel Hunt
Knox County	Robert Buntin
Knox County	General Washington Johnston
Knox County	George R. C. Sullivan
Orange County	Samuel Chambers
Perry County	Samuel Connor
Switzerland County	Ralph Cotton
Warrick County	Elisha Harrison
Washington County	Jonathan Lyon
Washington County	Samuel Milroy
Wayne County	Zachariah Ferguson
Wayne County	Lewis Johnson
Wayne County	John Sutherland

== See also ==
- List of Indiana General Assemblies
- List of speakers of the Indiana House of Representatives
- Politics of Indiana
- Elections in Indiana
- Historical outline of Indiana
