= 1824 United States presidential election in Indiana =

- November 8, 1824
- Turnout: 37.1%
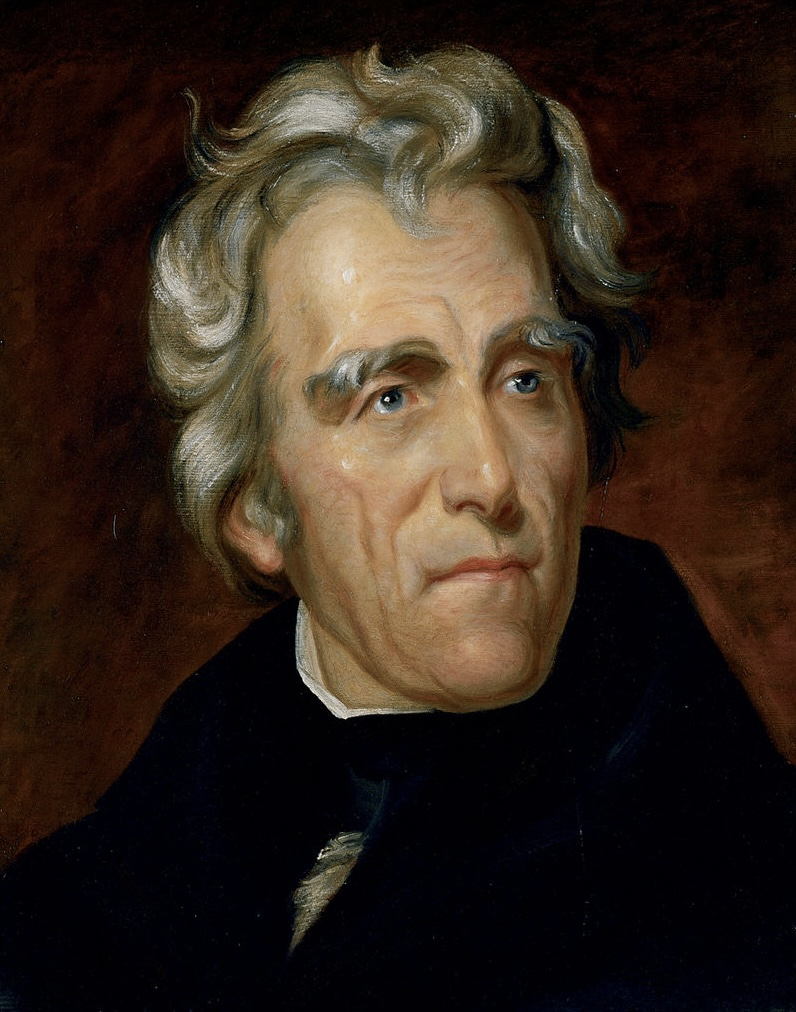

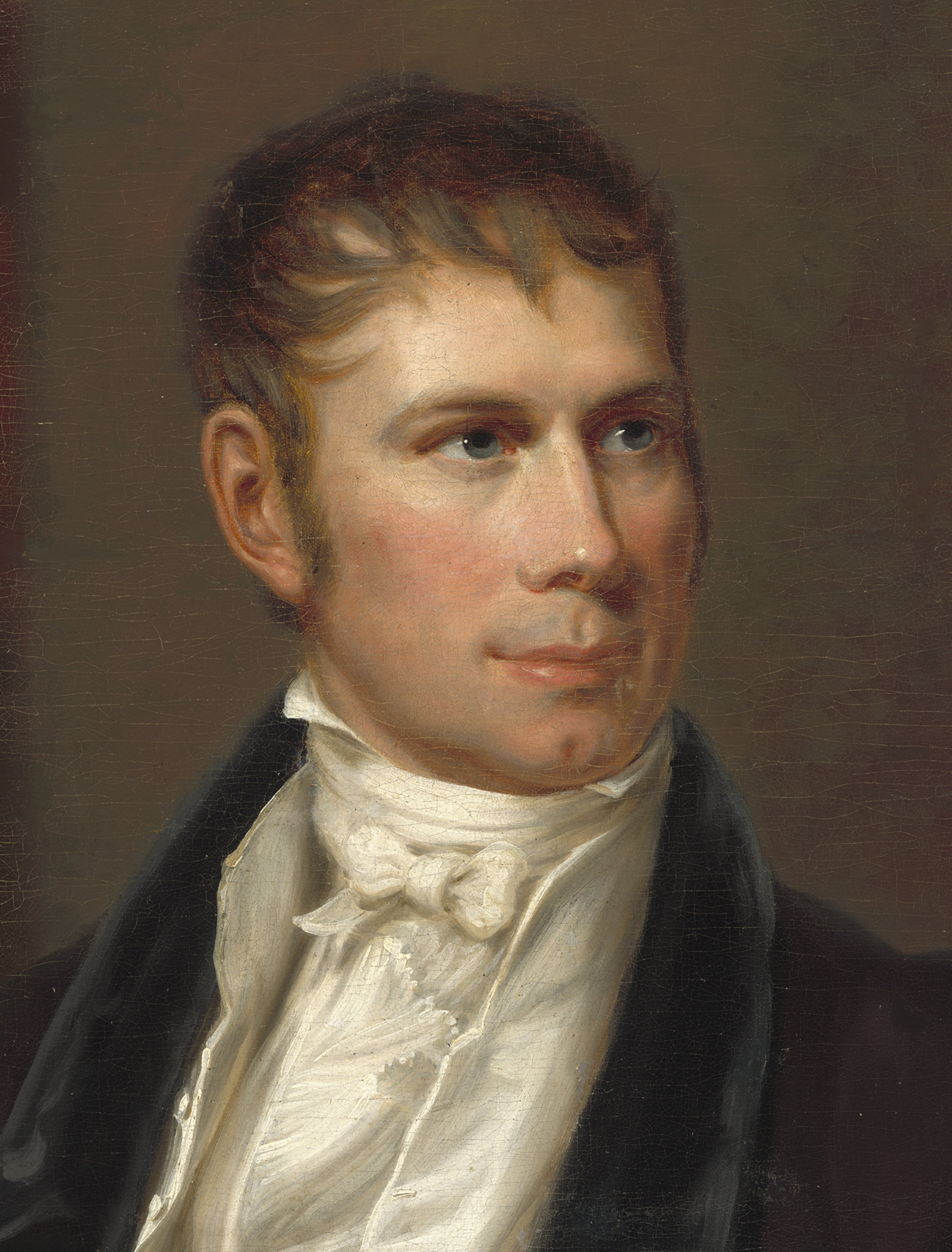

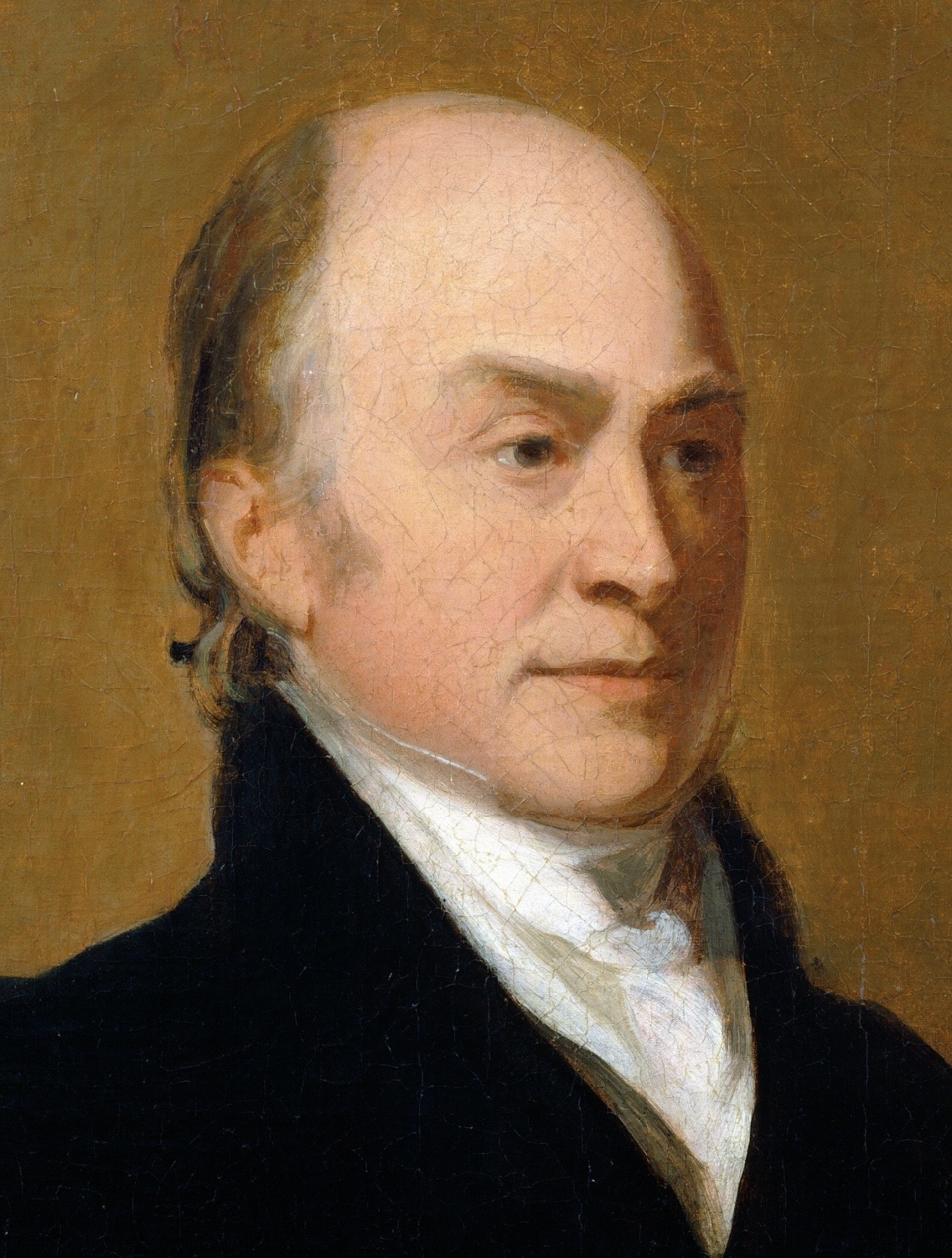
Nominee	Andrew Jackson	Henry Clay	John Quincy Adams
Party	Democratic-Republican	Democratic-Republican	Democratic-Republican
Home state	Tennessee	Kentucky	Massachusetts
Running mate	John C. Calhoun	Nathan Sanford	John C. Calhoun
Electoral vote	5	0	0
Popular vote	7,444	5,321	3,093
Percentage	46.9%	33.5%	19.5%

Jackson
40–50%
50–60%
60–70%
70–80%
Clay
30–40%
40–50%
50–60%
60–70%
80–90%
90–100%
Adams
40–50%
50–60%
Unknown/No vote
President before election
James Monroe
Democratic-Republican
Elected President
John Quincy Adams
Democratic-Republican

A presidential election was held in Indiana on November 8, 1824, as part of the 1824 United States presidential election. The junior U.S. senator from Tennessee Andrew Jackson defeated the speaker of the U.S. House of Representatives Henry Clay and the U.S. secretary of state John Quincy Adams. All three candidates represented the Democratic-Republican Party. No candidate won a majority of the electoral vote in the national election; Adams eventually became the 6th president of the United States after winning a contingent election conducted by the United States House of Representatives.

This was the first election in which Indiana's electors were elected by voters statewide, rather than by appointment of the state legislature. Jackson was nominated by delegates to a convention held at Salem, Indiana, and drew support based on his military record, residence in a Western state, support for internal improvements, and fidelity to republican principles. Clay hoped to carry the state based on his advocacy for Western interests, but was harmed by closeness to political elites blamed for the lingering economic recession. Adams was popular with Quakers and others opponents of slavery, but perceived indifference to the need for regional economic development limited his appeal. Jackson carried the state with a plurality based on his strength in Southern Indiana, while Clay won most of the sparsely-populated counties in Central Indiana. Adams ran a distant third in much of the state, but carried Randolph and Wayne counties, home to the Quaker stronghold of Richmond, Indiana.

== Background ==
The Indiana General Assembly passed legislation in January 1824 to appoint the state's electors by a popular vote. Whether to elect all five electors on a statewide general ticket, or individually from single-member districts, was the subject of broad disagreement. Hoosier diarist Calvin Fletcher reported lively debate in Indianapolis on the merits of both methods versus appointment by the legislature. Clay's supporters in the General Assembly favored election by districts in the belief that their candidate could not win a statewide vote. The general ticket system was thought by some observers to encourage official corruption, by increasing the influence of those who promised to deliver the state's electoral votes in exchange for plum patronage jobs. Despite these objections, the General Assembly decided in favor of a general ticket.

== Candidates ==
=== Jackson ===
Jackson was first nominated by the Tennessee General Assembly and was not expected to attract significant support. His rapid rise in popularity took the political establishment by surprise. Jackson's military exploits in the War of 1812, the Creek War, and the Seminole Wars made him a household name and a possible presidential candidate as early as 1818. The candidate's humble origins, regional identity, commitment to republicanism, and support for nationalist economic policies appealed broadly to settlers seeking a Western alternative to Clay; his supporters presented the general as a principled democrat untainted by corrupt associations with Eastern politicians and foreign monarchs.

Jackson's opponents impeached his moral character, military record, and fitness for office. Anti-Jackson editors compared the general to historical military dictators and warned that his election would undermine civil control of the military. Jackson's explosive temper, predilection for violence and dueling, and disregard for the rule of law were said to disqualify him from the presidency.

Lists of electors pledged to Jackson appeared as early as June. Confusion resulting from the lack of a central organization caused multiple competing Jackson tickets to circulate during the summer. To resolve this dilemma, Jackson's supporters held a state convention at Salem, Indiana, on September 16. With delegates from 13 of the state's 51 counties in attendance, the convention nominated a list of five electors and appointed a three-person state central committee. Local committees of correspondence were established in every county and township to conduct the campaign. The system developed by the Jacksonians for the 1824 campaign proved influential and became the model for future political campaigns in Indiana.

=== Clay ===
Clay was nominated by the Missouri, Kentucky, and Ohio state legislatures and hoped to emerged as the consensus choice of the Western states for president. A veteran legislator and influential U.S. House speaker, Clay was the favorite candidate of many prominent Indiana politicians, including the governor of Indiana William Hendricks. The support of the political establishment was transformed from an asset to a liability following the Panic of 1819, however. Popular anger was directed at the Second Bank of the United States, with which Clay was personally associated, and economic legislation seen to unfairly benefit special interest groups. Clay's public image as the preferred candidate of local and national elites harmed his standing with voters eager to punish elected leaders they blamed for the economic downturn.

Supporters praised Clay's advocacy for Western interests, republican simplicity, and experience in domestic and international affairs. Clay believed that his sponsorship of nationalist economic policies would outweigh other concerns with voters in the Old Northwest.

Clay first hoped for a nomination by the Indiana General Assembly, but anti-caucus feeling in the state led his supporters to forgo this course. A list of electors pledged to Clay was printed by several newspapers and endorsed by the friendly Indianapolis Gazette. Supposedly the product of a grassroots movement for Clay in the state, the list was likely composed by a small group of Clay's legislative allies in Indianapolis.

=== Adams ===
Adams was nominated by the Democratic-Republicans in the Massachusetts General Court and received a majority of newspaper endorsements in Indiana. A list of electors pledged to him was announced by his allies in April and distributed through the press. The candidate's personal integrity, high moral character, sobriety, and abstention from dueling were all in his favor, and for a time he was seen as the leading rival to Clay for Indiana's electoral votes. Adams's religious convictions were an issue, with supporters affirming his reverence for the Bible and Christian teachings. Quakers and other opponents of slavery supported Adams as the only Northerner and non-slaveholder still in the race on Election Day. His opponents attacked Adams's past ties to the Federalist Party, his alleged elitism, and his votes against territorial acquisition and federal aid for regional economic development while a member of the Senate.

=== Others ===
Calvin Fletcher recorded that in addition to Adams, Clay, and Jackson, William H. Crawford, John C. Calhoun, and DeWitt Clinton were discussed as potential presidential candidates during the fall of 1823. Crawford's candidacy was irreparably damaged when he received the endorsement of the Democratic-Republican congressional nominating caucus in February 1824. The caucus nomination tarred Crawford as the candidate of the unpopular Eastern political establishment; before summer he had effectively dropped out of the race in Indiana, having failed to attract significant support. Clinton's failure to win legislative approval for a bill to elect New York's electors by popular vote effectively ended his candidacy in February. Around this time, Calhoun also withdrew from the race in order to seek the vice presidency on both the Adams and Jackson tickets. These developments left Adams, Clay, and Jackson as the only remaining candidates in Indiana.

== Campaign issues ==
=== American System ===
Economic nationalism and the need for internal improvements were important issues in the campaign. Clay was strongly associated with the American System, a protectionist economic program that called for tariffs on foreign manufactures to boost domestic industry and raise revenue for the construction of roads and canals in the West. Adams's perceived weakness on the tariff and his reluctance to voice support for internal improvements damaged his standing with voters in the Old Northwest who prioritized the need for economic development. The candidate was viewed as personally sympathetic to nationalist policies, but unwilling to break with New England merchants who opposed federal spending to benefit the Western states. Jackson's surrogates also sought to strengthen their candidate's regional appeal by associating him with popular calls for protection and internal improvements. While Clay believed his position on the tariff would deliver the state, the unpopularity of his support for the Second Bank of the United States following the Panic of 1819 created an opening for Jackson to position himself as a nationalist alternative to the Kentuckian.

=== Caucus system ===
The congressional nominating caucus was increasingly the object of disapproval by 1824, as critics argued the practice of selecting candidates in a closed meeting of members of the United States Congress was undemocratic and potentially unconstitutional. Crawford's nomination by the Democratic-Republican congressional caucus in February disqualified him in the eyes of many Indiana voters, and he soon dropped out of the race in the state altogether. Sensitivity to the stigma attached to the caucus led Clay's supporters to forgo his nomination by the Indiana General Assembly. Tickets pledged to Adams and Clay were instead nominated informally through the press, while the Jackson electors were nominated by a state convention. Clay's backers attempted to make an issue of the fact that the Adams ticket originated with a meeting of friendly legislators; the Clay ticket, however, was similarly the product of a conference of Clay's allies in the legislature.

=== Sectionalism ===
Indiana's settler population came mostly from the Southern United States and the Mid-Atlantic region, while comparatively few Yankees settled in the state. The importance of the Mississippi River to the frontier economy led residents of the Ohio River Valley to develop a Western regional identity in the first half of the nineteenth century. Both Clay and Jackson appealed for votes on the basis of their residence in a Western state and promises to promote regional economic development through internal improvements.

Politically, the Ohio marked the boundary between the slave states and free states; recent confrontations over the future of slavery in the United States led some Hoosiers to prioritize cultural ties to the North ahead of regional economic self-interest. Clinton had some support as a Northern candidate prior to his withdrawal from the race; the principal beneficiary of anti-Southern sentiment, however, was Adams. The contest between Adams and Clay in Indiana forced Hoosiers to choose between their Western and Northern identities.

=== Slavery ===
Opposition to slavery played an important role in the early politics of Indiana. The Northwest Ordinance outlawed slavery in the territory north of the Ohio River from 1787, but extralegal slavery and legally-sanctioned involuntary servitude persisted into the 1820s. In the aftermath of the Missouri Compromise, many Indiana voters, particularly Quakers, demanded the election of an antislavery president after decades of government by Virginian enslavers. Antislavery feeling primarily benefited Adams as the only Northern candidate following Clinton's withdrawal. Clay's status as a slaveholder and his role in securing the admission of Missouri as a slave state damaged his candidacy with voters for whom abolitionism was an issue of primary importance.

== Opinion polling ==
Poll source	Date(s) administered	Sample size	Andrew Jackson Democratic- Republican	Henry Clay Democratic- Republican	John Q. Adams Democratic- Republican	Others Various
Western Sun & General Advertiser	July 5, 1824	305 (Note: Poll of a public meeting in Salem, Indiana.)	52%	8%	39%	—N/a
Western Sun & General Advertiser	August 2, 1824	200 (Note: Poll of voters at the local elections in Franklin Township, Floyd County, Indiana.)	75%	—N/a	25%	—N/a
Western Sun & General Advertiser	August 2, 1824	466 (Note: Poll of voters at the local elections in Daviess County, Indiana.)	64%	32%	3%	—N/a
Western Sun & General Advertiser	2–3 weeks preceding August 6, 1824	212 (Note: Poll of residents of Knox County, Indiana.)	57%	34%	8%	0% (Note: William H. Crawford)
Western Sun & General Advertiser	Before October 23, 1824	465 (Note: Poll of militia soldiers in Dearborn County, Indiana.)	66%	19%	15%	—N/a

== General election ==
=== Summary ===
Indiana chose five electors in a statewide general election. Nineteenth-century presidential elections used a form of block voting that allowed voters to modify the electoral list nominated by a political party before submitting their ballots. Because voters elected each member of the Electoral College individually, electors nominated by the same party often received differing numbers of votes as a consequence of voter rolloff, split-ticket voting, or electoral fusion. This table compares the votes for the most popular elector pledged to each ticket, to give an approximate sense of the statewide result.

1824 United States presidential election in Indiana
Party	Candidate	Votes	%
Democratic-Republican	Andrew Jackson John C. Calhoun	7,444	46.94
Democratic-Republican	Henry Clay; Nathan Sanford	5,321	33.5
Democratic-Republican	John Quincy Adams; John C. Calhoun	3,093	19.50
Total votes		15,858	100.00

=== Results ===
1824 United States presidential election in Indiana
Ticket	Candidate	Votes
Jackson	Johnathan McCarty	7,444
Jackson	John Carr	7,443
Jackson	Elias McNamee	7,427
Jackson	David Robb (Note: Including votes for "David Gibson" and "David Paten.")	7,427
Jackson	Samuel Milroy (Note: Including votes for "John Milroy.")	7,426
Clay	James Rariden	7,321
Clay	William W. Wick	7,317
Clay	Moses Tabbs	7,316
Clay	Martson G. Clark	7,313
Clay	Walter Wilson	7,311
Adams	David H. Maxwell	3,093
Adams	Christopher Harrison	3,092
Adams	Jesse Lynch Holman	3,091
Adams	Isaac Blackford	3,083
Adams	James Scott	3,071
Total		≈15,858

=== Results by county ===
This table compares the result for the most popular Jackson, Clay, and Adams electors in each county. The totals presented thus differ slightly from the statewide results summary, which compares the results for the most popular elector pledged to each ticket statewide. The margin is the difference between the first and second highest-voted tickets.

1824 United States presidential election in Indiana by county
County	Andrew Jackson Democratic-Republican		Henry Clay Democratic-Republican		John Quincy Adams Democratic-Republican		Margin		Total
County	Votes	Percent	Votes	Percent	Votes	Percent	Votes	Percent	Total
Allen	11	15.94	44	63.76	14	20.29	30	43.48	69
Bartholomew	96	44.65	99	46.05	20	9.30	3	1.40	215
Clark	589	60.22	156	15.95	233	23.82	356	3.64	978
Crawford	34	27.87	45	36.88	43	35.24	2	1.64	122
Daviess	114	50.67	92	40.89	19	8.44	22	9.78	225
Dearborn	668	57.73	122	10.54	367	31.72	301	26.02	1,157
Decatur	55	38.19	72	50.00	17	11.80	17	11.80	144
Dubois	32	54.24	18	30.51	9	15.25	14	23.73	59
Fayette	355	49.03	277	38.26	92	12.71	78	10.77	724
Floyd	216	56.25	50	13.02	118	30.73	98	25.52	384
Franklin	471	50.43	244	26.12	219	23.44	27	2.89	934
Gibson	133	41.96	169	53.31	15	4.73	36	11.36	317
Greene	28	56.00	10	20.00	12	24.00	16	32.00	50
Hamilton	4	8.89	31	68.89	10	22.22	21	46.67	45
Harrison	185	41.48	129	28.92	132	29.60	53	11.88	446
Hendricks	6	16.22	30	81.08	1	2.70	24	6.49	37
Henry	42	26.25	96	60.00	22	13.75	54	33.75	160
Jackson	176	68.75	23	8.98	57	22.26	119	46.48	256
Jefferson	298	40.82	371	50.82	61	8.36	73	10.00	730
Jennings	131	43.96	76	25.50	91	30.54	40	13.42	298
Johnson	28	35.00	38	47.50	14	17.50	10	12.5	80
Knox	171	35.26	280	57.73	34	7.01	109	22.47	485
Lawrence	228	76.00	44	14.67	28	9.33	184	61.33	300
Madison	6	9.38	54	84.38	4	6.25	48	75.00	64
Marion	99	30.18	213	64.94	16	4.88	114	34.76	328
Martin	44	39.28	30	26.78	38	33.93	6	5.36	112
Monroe	149	54.98	71	26.20	51	18.82	78	28.78	271
Montgomery	40	35.09	57	50.00	17	14.91	17	14.91	114
Morgan	71	43.29	83	50.61	10	6.07	12	7.32	164
Orange	213	50.84	145	34.61	61	14.56	68	16.23	419
Owen	34	27.64	77	62.60	12	9.76	43	34.96	123
Parke	45	27.61	111	68.10	7	4.29	66	40.49	163
Perry	5	19.23	12	46.15	9	34.62	3	11.54	26
Pike	62	44.93	73	52.90	3	2.17	9	6.52	138
Posey	173	41.79	228	55.07	13	3.14	55	13.28	414
Putnam	27	32.53	31	37.35	25	30.12	4	4.82	83
Randolph	62	43.97	7	4.96	72	51.06	10	7.09	141
Ripley	119	50.00	102	42.86	33	13.86	17	7.14	238
Rush	119	49.17	108	44.63	15	6.20	11	4.54	242
Scott	123	52.79	84	36.05	26	11.16	39	16.74	233
Shelby	144	56.03	104	40.47	9	3.50	40	15.56	257
Spencer	10	20.83	33	68.75	5	10.42	23	47.92	48
Sullivan	104	29.80	175	50.14	21	6.02	71	20.34	349
Switzerland	161	54.21	108	36.36	28	9.43	53	17.84	297
Union	254	53.59	135	28.48	85	17.93	119	25.10	474
Vanderburgh	32	26.45	56	46.28	33	27.27	23	19.01	121
Vermillion	2	2.35	79	92.94	4	4.71	75	88.24	85
Vigo	54	16.62	227	69.85	44	13.54	173	53.23	325
Warrick	54	49.09	45	40.91	11	10.00	9	8.18	110
Washington	669	67.17	55	5.52	272	27.31	397	39.86	996
Wayne	501	37.17	306	22.70	541	40.13	40	2.97	1,348
TOTAL	7,447	46.94	5,325	33.56	3,093	19.50	2,122	13.38	15,865

=== Results by congressional district ===
The following table calculates the result in each of the state's three congressional districts based on the county returns as tabulated above. District boundaries are from the Laws of Indiana for 1824.

1824 United States presidential election in Indiana by congressional district
District	Jackson	Clay	Adams	Representative
1st	40.79%	48.47%	10.74%	William Prince (Note: Died prior to the election.) (18th Congress)
1st	40.79%	48.47%	10.74%	Jacob Call (Note: Won the special election for the unexpired term of William Prince, November 8, 1824.) (18th Congress)
1st	40.79%	48.47%	10.74%	Ratliff Boon (19th Congress)
2nd	51.51%	28.13%	20.36%	Jonathan Jennings
3rd	47.41%	27.27%	25.32%	John Test

=== Maps ===
Jackson electors by county

Clay electors by county

Adams electors by county

Congressional district results

Jackson electors by district

Clay electors by district

Adams electors by district

== See also ==
- United States presidential elections in Indiana

== Bibliography ==
=== Primary sources ===
- Indiana (1824). The Revised Laws of Indiana [...]. Corydon.

=== Secondary sources ===
- Bennett, Zachary Morgan (2013). One River, One Nation: The Ohio River in an American Borderland, 1800–1850 (Master of Arts thesis). Oxford, OH: Miami University.
- Carmony, Donald F. (1998). Indiana, 1816–1850: The Pioneer Era. Indianapolis: Indiana Historical Bureau.
- Finkelman, Paul (March 2015). "Almost a Free State: The Indiana Constitution of 1816 and the Problem of Slavery". Indiana Magazine of History. 111 (1): 64–95.
- Howard, Thomas W. (September 1967). "Indiana Newspapers and the Presidential Election of 1824". Indiana Magazine of History. 63 (3): 177–206. JSTOR 27789429.
- Lampi, Philip J. (n.d.). "Electoral College". A New Nation Votes. American Antiquarian Society.
- Lampi, Philip J. (January 11, 2012). "Indiana 1824 Electoral College". A New Nation Votes. American Antiquarian Society.
- Madison, James H. (1986). The Indiana Way: A State History. Bloomington: Indiana University Press.
- Ratcliffe, Donald J. (2015). The One-Party Presidential Contest: Adams, Jackson, and 1824's Five-Horse Race. Lawrence: University Press of Kansas.
- Ratcliffe, Donald J. (Spring 2014). "Popular Preferences in the Presidential Election of 1824". Journal of the Early Republic. 34 (1): 45–77. JSTOR 24486931.
- Riker, Dorothy; Thornbrough, Gayle, eds. (1960). Indiana Election Returns, 1816–1851. Indianapolis: Indiana Historical Bureau.
- Thornbrough, Gayle, ed. (1972). The Diary of Calvin Fletcher. Vol. 1. Indianapolis: Indiana Historical Society.
