= Government of Indiana =

State government of the United States

- Seal of the State of Indiana
- Part of: United States of America
- Constitution: Constitution of Indiana

Legislative branch
- Name: General Assembly
- Type: Bicameral
- Meeting place: Indiana Statehouse
- Upper house
- Name: Senate
- Presiding officer: Micah Beckwith, President
- Lower house
- Name: House of Representatives
- Presiding officer: Todd Huston, Speaker

Executive branch
- Head of state and government
- Title: Governor
- Currently: Mike Braun
- Appointer: Election
- Cabinet
- Leader: Governor
- Deputy leader: Lieutenant Governor
- Headquarters: Indiana Statehouse

Judicial branch
- Courts: Courts of Indiana
- Supreme Court of Indiana
- Chief judge: Loretta Rush
- Seat: Indianapolis

The government of Indiana is established and regulated by the Constitution of Indiana. The state-level government consists of three branches: the judicial branch, the legislative branch, and the executive branch. The three branches share power and jointly govern the state of Indiana. County and local governments are also constitutional bodies with limited authority to levy taxes, pass legislation, and create and maintain local public infrastructure.

The government of Indiana was first formed in December 1816 and replaced the government of the Indiana Territory. The early government came under criticism beginning as early as the 1820s for having many public offices filled by appointment and lack of delegation of authority to lower officials, requiring state level legislation for things like divorce approval. In 1851 a new constitution was adopted by the state, remedying many of these problems and opening many more office to public election. Significant government reforms were enacted again in 1971 when the state courts were reorganized and new powers were granted to the governor which had historically been a weak institution.

Elections to fill positions in Indiana's government are held on Election Day, with special elections being occasionally held to fill unexpected vacancies. State representatives serve two-year terms, while all other elected state, county, and municipal officials serve four-year terms. Terms are staggered so that elections are held nearly every year, not just in even-numbered years. Most of the positions in the government bureaucracy are filled through the state merit system or the state patronage system.

The government provides a wide range of services including law enforcement, infrastructure construction and maintenance, licensing and registration, tax collection, fire protection, business and utility regulation, utility services, and park and conservation maintenance efforts.

== Organization ==
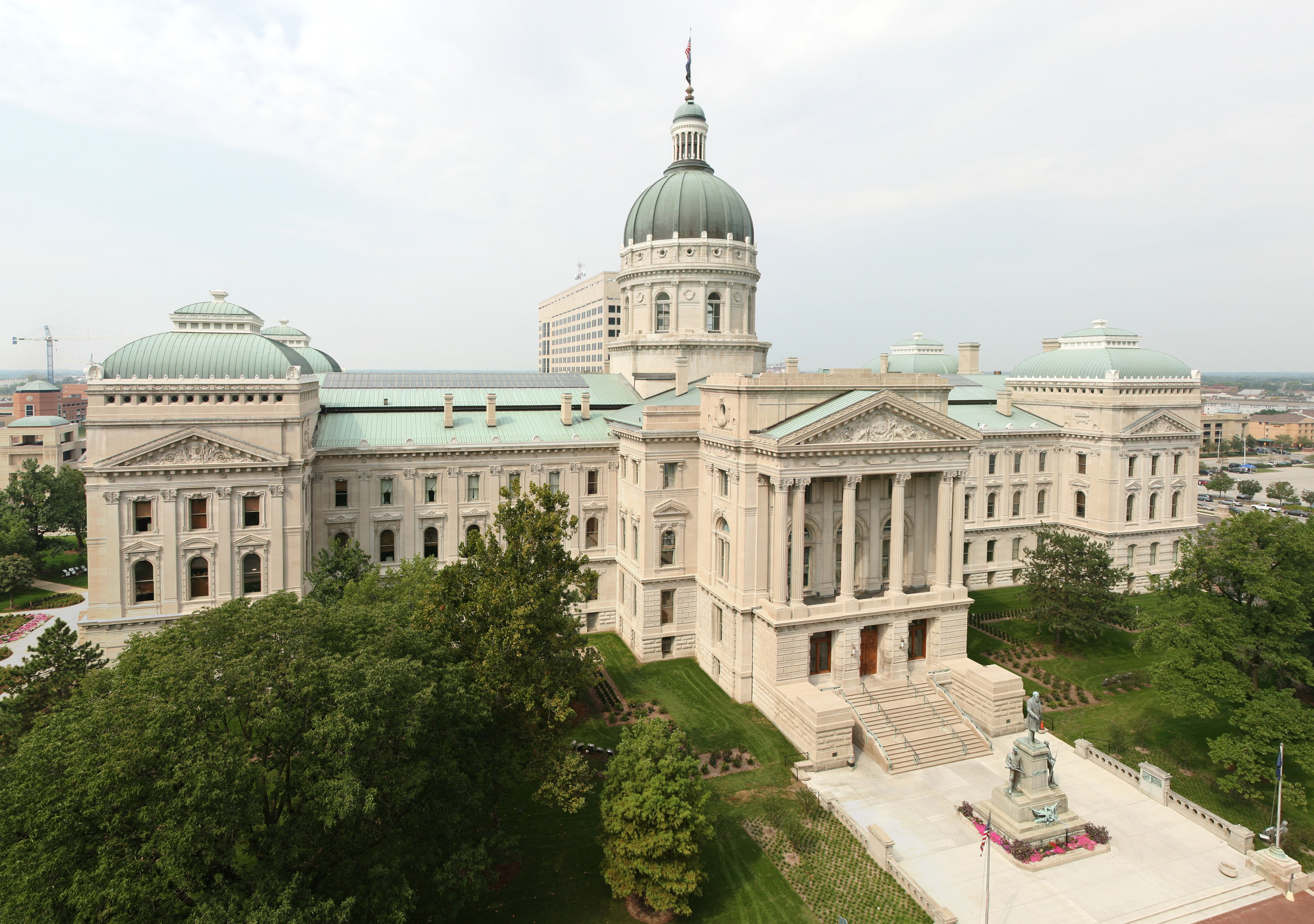
The Indiana Statehouse, the seat of government for all three branches of the State Government

The government of Indiana sits in the state capital of Indianapolis. Each of the three branches operates out of the Indiana Statehouse. The state maintains several office buildings that hold many of its bureaus and departments. Most of the state's bureaus are located in the Indiana Government Center, a building complex in downtown Indianapolis, located immediately west of the Statehouse.

=== Legislature ===
The Indiana General Assembly is the legislative branch of the state of Indiana. It is a bicameral legislature that consists of a lower house, the Indiana House of Representatives, and an upper house, the Indiana Senate. The General Assembly meets annually at the Indiana State House in Indianapolis.

Members of the General Assembly are elected from districts that are realigned every ten years. Representatives serve two-year terms; senators serve four-year terms. Both houses must pass a bill before it can be submitted to the governor and enacted into law.

=== Judiciary ===
The Indiana Supreme Court is the highest judicial body in Indiana. The court oversees the lower courts and commissions that jointly make up the judicial branch. The other courts include the Indiana Tax Court, the Indiana Court of Appeals, and circuit, superior, and city or town courts. Every county in the state has a circuit court, in which all matter of suits may be filed, and the larger cities (such as Indianapolis, Fort Wayne, South Bend, Evansville, and Terre Haute) have courts of concurrent jurisdiction that act as superior or municipal courts. The courts are assisted by several commissions that are also part of the judicial branch, including the Judicial Nominating Commission.

=== Executive ===
The governor of Indiana is the chief executive officer of the government of Indiana. Elected to a four-year term, the governor is responsible for overseeing the day-to-day management of the functions of the state government. The governor is assisted by other officials elected to the executive branch including the lieutenant governor and the attorney general. The governor is Mike Braun (R) since 2025, the lieutenant overnor is Micah Beckwith (R) since 2025, the attorney general is Todd Rokita (R) since 2021, the secretary of state is Diego Morales (R) since 2023, the treasurer is Daniel Elliott (R) since 2023, and the auditor is Elise Nieshalla (R) since 2023.

== Checks and balances ==
The Constitution of Indiana has several checks and balances built into its clauses to prevent any one branch of the government from becoming dominant. The governor has the power to veto any bill passed by the General Assembly. The General Assembly has the power to override a veto with a simple majority. The courts have the authority to declare laws unconstitutional and repeal them, while the General Assembly has the power to initiate an amendment to the constitution to override the decision of the courts. Indiana judges are appointed by a commission made up of representatives of the governor and the courts. The courts' jurisdictions can be regulated by the General Assembly.

== Administrative divisions ==
=== County government ===
Indiana has 92 counties.

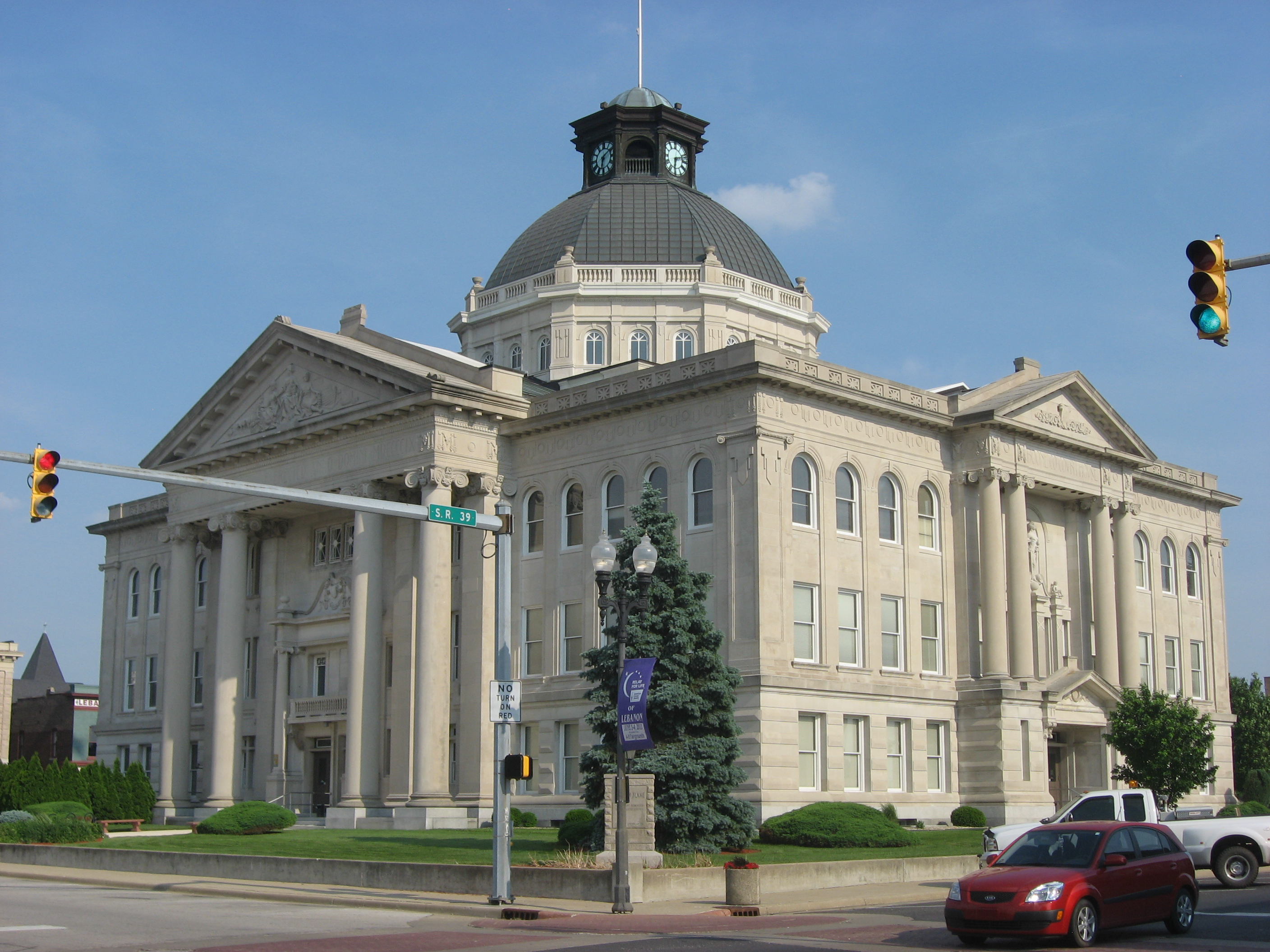
Boone County Courthouse

County council: A county council of seven or nine members controls all spending and revenue of the county government. Each county sets their own rules of whether or not a council position is At-Large or divided by districts. The council members serve four-year terms. They are responsible for setting salaries, the annual budget, and special spending. The council also has limited authority to impose local taxes, usually in the form of an income tax that is subject to state-level approval, excise taxes, or service taxes, like those on dining or lodging.

Board of commissioners: The executive body consists of three commissioners. The commissioners are elected county-wide, and serve four-year terms, which are usually staggered. One of the commissioners, typically the most senior, serves as president. The commissioners are responsible for carrying out the acts legislated by the council, and for managing the day-to-day functions of the county government.

Boards and commissions: Counties also utilize boards and commissions to oversee different aspects of the county. These boards are usually filled by direct election from the public, appointment by the Board of Commissioners, or a combination of both methods. Boards and commissions typically oversee management of water facilities, public roads, and new projects, among other tasks. For example, each school district has a board, whose members are chosen through public election. County school boards are responsible for funding and management of the public school system within their district. The majority of school funding comes from property taxes. The tax rate is subject to state level approval and is capped by law.

Courts: Each county has its own circuit court, formed pursuant to the Indiana state constitution. Some counties have additional courts. The circuit and superior courts are courts of general jurisdiction. Several counties, including Marion County, also have dedicated small claims courts, in addition to city courts and town courts with statutorily defined jurisdiction.

County officials: The county has several other elected offices; including a sheriff, coroner, auditor, treasurer, recorder, surveyor, and circuit court clerk. Each of these elected officers serves a term of four years and oversees a different part of the county government. Members elected to county government positions are required to declare party affiliations and to be residents of the county.

=== Town government ===
Many small communities in Indiana are incorporated as towns. A town includes a three, five, or seven-member town council serving primarily the legislative function of government. For practical reasons, the town council may share in some of the executive functions. However, under statute, the role of the executive officer belongs to the president of the town council. The president of the town council is an elected member of the town council, selected by their fellow town councillors to lead the council. The council may also appoint a non-partisan town manager to oversee the day-to-day operations of the municipal government. The council is responsible for setting the town's budget and tax rates, and hiring all town employees. Unlike some states, Indiana town council members must declare a political party affiliation when they file to run for office. Indiana towns also elect clerk/treasurers, who manage town finances. As elected officials, clerk/treasurers operate independently of the town council, but within the council-approved budget.

=== City government ===
Most larger communities are incorporated as cities. A city can be either a third- or second-class city (the first-class designation is reserved for Indianapolis). Classification of cities is according to the Indiana Code, differentiated primarily by population. Large cities are first class, medium cities are second class, and small cities are third class. An Indiana city has a mayor-council form of government, but a third-class city may appoint a city manager. The mayor, elected to a four-year term, serves as the executive. Most mayors in Indiana are elected in partisan elections. The legislative branch consists of a five, seven, or nine-member city council. Council members serve four-year terms, and may be elected by geographic districts or at-large. Most cities in Indiana use districts.

=== Township government ===
The state's 92 counties are divided into 1,008 townships.

A township trustee administers the civil government of the township. The trustee is elected by the residents of the township to a term of four years. The trustee is responsible for providing fire protection and ambulance service to unincorporated areas, providing for poor relief and burial of the indigent, maintaining cemeteries and burial grounds, resolving fencing disputes between neighbors, investigating claims of livestock killed by dogs, controlling weeds, managing the township budget and financial records, and preparing an annual financial report. Other public matters in which a trustee may sometimes be involved include zoning, parks, libraries, schools, shelters and community centers.

The trustee is assisted by a three-member Township Board whose members are elected to four-year terms. Duties of the board include adopting the annual budget, serving as a board of finance and approving township contracts. In January of each year, the trustee presents to the board an annual report showing the receipts, expenditures, investments and debts of the township. The approved report is then published in local papers for public inspection.

State law requires the township trustee to perform the following duties:

1. Keeping a written record of official proceedings.
2. Managing all township property interests.
3. Keeping township records open for public inspection.
4. Attending all meetings of the township legislative body.
5. Receiving and paying out township funds.
6. Examining and settling all accounts and demands chargeable against the township.
7. Administering township assistance under IC 12-20 and IC 12-30-4.
8. Performing the duties of Fence Viewer under IC 32–26.
9. Providing and maintaining cemeteries under IC 23–14.
10. Providing fire protection under IC 36–8, except in a township that is located in a county having a consolidated city that has consolidated the township's fire department under IC 36-3-1-6.1.
11. Filing an annual personnel report under IC 5-11-13.
12. Providing and maintain township parks and community centers under IC 36–10.
13. Destroying detrimental plants, noxious weeds, and rank vegetation under IC 15-16-8.
14. Providing insulin to the poor under IC 12-20-16.
15. Performing other duties prescribed by statute.

Township governments have long been criticized for being outdated, inefficient, and unnecessary. About 790 townships have fewer than 5,000 people and about 250 have fewer than 1,000 people. A 2007 blue-ribbon commission chaired by former governor Joe Kernan and chief justice Randall T. Shepard recommended transferring all township responsibilities to a strengthened county government. Only the role of property tax assessor was ultimately shifted to counties. After decades of discussion about township reform, the state legislature passed a bill in 2026 that requires certain townships that provide limited services, failed to file financial reports, or failed to fill elected trustee and board positions to merge with neighboring townships or overlapping municipalities. The bill's author estimated that 325 townships would face mergers.

== Politics ==
Indiana has long been considered to be a Republican stronghold and is rated R+11 on the Cook Partisan Voting Index. The current governor of Indiana is Republican Mike Braun, and Republicans hold supermajorities in both chambers of the Indiana General Assembly. It has only supported a Democrat for president four times since 1912- in the elections of 1932, 1936, 1964, and 2008. Historically, the state was a swing state, voting for the national winner all but four times from 1816 to 1912, with the exceptions of 1824, 1836, 1848, and 1876.

Nonetheless, half of Indiana's governors in the 20th century were Democrats. Indiana has also elected several Democrats to the Senate in recent years. Certain cities, too, tend to favor Democrats; Gary, Indiana has had a Democratic mayor for the last 77 years. As while only five Democratic presidential nominees have carried Indiana since 1900, 11 Democrats were elected governor during that time. Before Mitch Daniels became governor in 2005, Democrats had held the office for 16 consecutive years. Since then, however, the office has been held consistently by Republicans. Democrats also generally held control of the Indiana House of Representatives during the 1990s and 2000s as well.

Historically, Republicans have been strongest in the eastern and southern portions of the state, as well as the suburbs of the state's major cities. Democrats have been strongest in the northwestern and central parts of the state along with the major cities. However, outside of Indianapolis, the Chicago suburbs, and Bloomington; the state's Democrats tend to be somewhat more conservative than their counterparts in the rest of the country, especially on social issues.

Indiana's delegation to the United States House of Representatives is not completely Republican either. Instead, it has generally served as a bellwether for the political movement of the nation. For instance, Democrats held the majority of seats until the 1994 Republican Revolution, when Republicans took a majority. This continued until 2006, when three Republican congressmen were defeated in Indiana; (Chris Chocola, John Hostettler and Mike Sodrel), giving the Democrats a majority of the delegation again.

== See also ==
- Politics of Indiana
- Governor of Indiana
- Indiana General Assembly
- Indiana Supreme Court
- Constitution of Indiana
- Political party strength in Indiana
