= List of Indiana General Assemblies =

List of Indiana state legislatures

The legislature of the U.S. state of Indiana has convened many times since statehood became effective on December 11, 1816.

In the early 19th century, house members were elected annually; senators were elected for three-year terms.

== Legislatures ==
Number	Start date	End date	Last election
Indiana Constitution of 1816
1st Indiana General Assembly	November 4, 1816	January 3, 1817	
2nd Indiana General Assembly	1817		
3rd Indiana General Assembly	1818		
4th Indiana General Assembly	1819		
5th Indiana General Assembly	1820		
6th Indiana General Assembly	1821		
7th Indiana General Assembly	1822		
8th Indiana General Assembly	1823		
9th Indiana General Assembly	1825		
10th Indiana General Assembly	1825		
11th Indiana General Assembly	1826		
12th Indiana General Assembly	1827		
13th Indiana General Assembly	1828		
14th Indiana General Assembly	1829		
15th Indiana General Assembly	1830		
16th Indiana General Assembly	1831		
17th Indiana General Assembly	1832		
18th Indiana General Assembly	1833		
19th Indiana General Assembly	1834		
20th Indiana General Assembly	1835		
21st Indiana General Assembly	1836		
22nd Indiana General Assembly	1837		
23rd Indiana General Assembly	1838		
24th Indiana General Assembly	1839		
25th Indiana General Assembly	1840		
26th Indiana General Assembly	1841		
27th Indiana General Assembly	1842		
28th Indiana General Assembly	1843		
29th Indiana General Assembly	1844		
30th Indiana General Assembly	1845		
31st Indiana General Assembly	1846		
32nd Indiana General Assembly	1847		
33rd Indiana General Assembly	1848		
34th Indiana General Assembly	1849		
35th Indiana General Assembly	1850		
36th Indiana General Assembly	1851		
Indiana Constitution of 1851
37th Indiana General Assembly	1853		October 1852
38th Indiana General Assembly	1855		
39th Indiana General Assembly	1857		
40th Indiana General Assembly	1858		
41st Indiana General Assembly	1861		
42nd Indiana General Assembly	1861		
43rd Indiana General Assembly	1863		
44th Indiana General Assembly	1865		
45th Indiana General Assembly	1867		
46th Indiana General Assembly	1869		
47th Indiana General Assembly	1871		
48th Indiana General Assembly	1872		
49th Indiana General Assembly	1875		
50th Indiana General Assembly	1877		
51st Indiana General Assembly	1879		
52nd Indiana General Assembly	1881		
53rd Indiana General Assembly	1883		
54th Indiana General Assembly	1885		
55th Indiana General Assembly	1887		
56th Indiana General Assembly	1889		
57th Indiana General Assembly	1891		
58th Indiana General Assembly	1893		
59th Indiana General Assembly	1895		
60th Indiana General Assembly	1897		
61st Indiana General Assembly	January 5, 1899		
62nd Indiana General Assembly	1901		
63rd Indiana General Assembly	1903		
64th Indiana General Assembly	1905		
65th Indiana General Assembly	1907		
66th Indiana General Assembly	1909		
67th Indiana General Assembly	1911		
68th Indiana General Assembly	1913		
69th Indiana General Assembly	1915		
70th Indiana General Assembly	1917		
71st Indiana General Assembly	1919		
72nd Indiana General Assembly	1921		
73rd Indiana General Assembly	1923		
74th Indiana General Assembly	1925		
75th Indiana General Assembly	1927		
76th Indiana General Assembly	1929		
77th Indiana General Assembly	1931		
78th Indiana General Assembly	1933		
79th Indiana General Assembly	1935		
80th Indiana General Assembly	1937		
81st Indiana General Assembly	1939		
82nd Indiana General Assembly	1941		
83rd Indiana General Assembly	1942		
84th Indiana General Assembly	1944		
85th Indiana General Assembly	1947		
86th Indiana General Assembly	1949		
87th Indiana General Assembly	1951		
88th Indiana General Assembly	1953		
89th Indiana General Assembly	1955		
90th Indiana General Assembly	1957		
91st Indiana General Assembly	1959		
92nd Indiana General Assembly	1961		
93rd Indiana General Assembly	1963		
94th Indiana General Assembly	1965		
95th Indiana General Assembly	1967		
96th Indiana General Assembly	1969		
97th Indiana General Assembly	1971		
98th Indiana General Assembly	1973		
99th Indiana General Assembly	1975		
100th Indiana General Assembly	1977		
101st Indiana General Assembly	1979		
102nd Indiana General Assembly	1981		
103rd Indiana General Assembly	1983		
104th Indiana General Assembly	1985		
105th Indiana General Assembly	1987		
106th Indiana General Assembly	1989		
107th Indiana General Assembly	1991		
108th Indiana General Assembly	1993		
109th Indiana General Assembly	1995		
110th Indiana General Assembly	1997		
111th Indiana General Assembly	1999	2000	
112th Indiana General Assembly	2001		
113th Indiana General Assembly	2003		November 2002
114th Indiana General Assembly	2005		November 2004
115th Indiana General Assembly	2007		November 7, 2006
116th Indiana General Assembly	2009	March 12, 2010	November 4, 2008
117th Indiana General Assembly	2011	March 14, 2012	November 2, 2010
118th Indiana General Assembly	2013	March 14, 2014	November 6, 2012
119th Indiana General Assembly	2015	March 10, 2016	November 4, 2014
120th Indiana General Assembly	January 3, 2017		November 8, 2016
121st Indiana General Assembly	January 3, 2019		November 6, 2018: Senate
122nd Indiana General Assembly	2021	March 8, 2022	November 3, 2020: House, Senate
123rd Indiana General Assembly	January 9, 2023	March 8, 2024	November 8, 2022: House, Senate
124th Indiana General Assembly	2025		November 5, 2024: House, Senate

== See also ==
- List of speakers of the Indiana House of Representatives
- List of governors of Indiana
- Politics of Indiana
- Elections in Indiana
- Indiana State Capitol
- Historical outline of Indiana
- Lists of United States state legislative sessions
