= Elihu Stout =

American journalist

Elihu Stout (1782–1860) was the founder of Indiana's first newspaper, the Indiana Gazette. He was born in Newark, New Jersey. He came to Indiana in 1804. Stout wrote for the Western Sun. He was said to have first set up his press in a log cabin on First Street in Vincennes, Indiana. He was said to be a friend of Andrew Jackson.

== For Researchers ==
There are several documents pertaining to Elihu Stout in the Indiana Memory collaborative collection of primary sources.

== Legacy ==
In 1966, Elihu Stout was inducted into the Indiana Journalism Hall of Fame.
