= Jacob Call =

American politician

Member of the U.S. House of Representatives from Indiana's 1st district
- In office December 23, 1824 – March 3, 1825

Personal details
- Born: Kentucky
- Died: April 20, 1826 Frankfort, Kentucky
- Party: Jackson Republican
- Occupation: Attorney, politician

Jacob Call (died April 20, 1826) was an American lawyer who briefly served as a U.S. representative from Indiana from 1824 to 1825.

== Biography ==
Born in Kentucky, Call was graduated from an academy in Kentucky where he studied law.

=== Early career ===
He was admitted to the bar and practiced in Vincennes and Princeton, Indiana. He served as judge of the Knox County Circuit Court, 1817, 1818, and from 1822 to 1824.

=== Free slaves case ===
In 1820, Call represented the defendant in the case of Polly v. Lasselle, losing the case which led to all slaves in the state of Indiana being freed.

=== Congress ===
Call was elected as a Jackson Republican to the Eighteenth Congress to fill the vacancy caused by the death of United States Representative William Prince. He served from December 23, 1824, to March 3, 1825.

=== Death ===
He died in Frankfort, Kentucky, on April 20, 1826.

U.S. House of Representatives
Preceded by William Prince	Member of the U.S. House of Representatives from Indiana's 1st congressional district December 23, 1824 - March 3, 1825	Succeeded by Ratliff Boon
