= 2004 Indiana elections =

Indiana elections, 2004
- 2004

The Indiana general election was held on November 2, 2004. Primary elections took place on May 4, 2004.

== Federal elections ==
=== President ===
United States presidential election in Indiana, 2004
Party	Candidate	Votes	%	±%
Republican	George W. Bush (Incumbent)	1,479,438	59.94%	
Democratic	John Kerry	969,011	39.26%	
Libertarian	Michael Badnarik	18,058	0.73%	
Write In	Ralph Nader	1,328	0.1%	
Write In	David Cobb	102	0.0%	
Write In	John Joseph Kennedy	37	0.0%	
Write In	Walt Brown	22	0.0%	
Write In	Lawson Mitchell Bone	6	0.0%	
Majority		510,427	20.68%	
Turnout		2,468,002	58%	

=== Senate ===
Incumbent Democratic Senator Evan Bayh easily defeated Republican nominee Marvin Scott, a sociology professor at Butler University.

United States Senate election in Indiana, 2004
Party	Candidate	Votes	%
Democratic	Evan Bayh (incumbent)	1,496,976	61.7%
Republican	Marvin Scott	903,913	37.2%
Libertarian	Albert Barger	27,344	1.1%
Total votes		2,428,233	100.0%
Democratic hold			

=== House ===
United States House of Representatives elections in Indiana, 2004
Party	Votes	Percentage	Seats	+/–
Republican	1,381,699	57.18%	7	+1
Democratic	999,082	41.35%	2	-1
Libertarian	35,470	1.47%	0	-
Totals	2,416,251	100.00%	9	-

== State elections ==
=== Governor ===
Incumbent Democratic governor Joe Kernan lost in an upset against Republican nominee Mitch Daniels, former Director of the Office of Management and Budget under George W. Bush. It was the first time that the Republicans had held the office in 16 years.

Indiana gubernatorial election, 2004
Party	Candidate	Votes	%	±%
Republican	Mitch Daniels	1,302,912	53.21%	+11.54%
Democratic	Joe Kernan (incumbent)	1,113,900	45.49%	−11.06%
Libertarian	Kenn Gividen	31,664	1.29%	−0.48%
Write-ins		22	0.00%	
Majority		189,012	7.72%	−7.16%
Turnout		2,448,498	57%	
Republican gain from Democratic		Swing		

Results by county Carter: 40–50%; 50–60%; 60–70%; 70–80%; Hogsett: 40–50%; 50–60%

=== Attorney general ===
Incumbent Republican attorney general Steve Carter defeated Democratic nominee Joe Hogsett, former Indiana secretary of state and former chair of the Indiana Democratic Party.

2004 Indiana Attorney General election results
Party	Candidate	Votes	%	±%
Republican	Steve Carter	1,389,640	58.18%	+6.90%
Democratic	Joe Hogsett	953,500	39.92%	−6.64%
Libertarian	Aaron T. Milewski	45,212	1.89%	−0.27%
Total votes		2,388,352	100.00%	
Republican hold				
