= Vincennes Sun-Commercial =

Newspaper published in Vincennes

- Where the spirit of the lord is, there is liberty
- Masthead
- Type: Daily newspaper
- Format: Broadsheet
- Owner: Paxton Media Group
- Founder: Elihu Stout
- Publisher: Gayle Robbins
- Editor: Gayle Robbins
- Founded: 1804
- Headquarters: Vincennes, IN
- Website: www.suncommercial.com

The Vincennes Sun-Commercial is a newspaper in the city of Vincennes, Indiana, United States. It is currently a member of the Hoosier State Press Association. The newspaper was originally created by Elihu Stout in 1804, and is the first newspaper in the state of Indiana. In 2004 the Vincennes Sun-Commercial was recognized by the Indiana General Assembly House of Representatives on the occasion of the 200th anniversary of its founding.

== History ==
In the year 1804 then governor William Henry Harrison of the Indiana territory was in search of a printer to publish the territorial and federal laws of the new territory of Indiana. Elihu Stout, then 22 years old, traveled from New Jersey and convinced Harrison that he was able to publish the newspaper. The name of the newspaper was the Indiana Gazette, which was a 4-page paper that contained mostly legal notices and advertisements, and sold for about $5 for a year's subscription. In 1806 just 2 years after the start of the newspaper, the shop was destroyed by fire. A year later Stout restarted circulation, and renamed the newspaper The Western Sun.

In 1845 Elihu Stout sold the newspaper to John R. Jones, and it was renamed Jones' Vincennes Sentinel, the Vincennes Patriot, and in 1853, the Courant and Patriot. The newspaper was subsequently changed to back to the Western Sun when George E. Green purchased the business in 1856. Throughout the years the newspaper went through many name changes, until the Western Sun was discontinued due to the creation of the Vincennes Sun newspaper. Eventually the Vincennes Sun was merged with a competing newspaper named the Vincennes Commercial to create what is now called the Vincennes Sun-Commercial.

In 1966 Elihu Stout was inducted into Indiana Journalism Hall of Fame.

== Current ==
Today the newspaper is owned by Paxton Media Group of Paducah, Kentucky. The current publisher and editor is Gayle R. Robbins, who is a distant relative of Elihu Stout, the original publisher and editor of the newspaper.
