= Williamson Dunn =

American politician

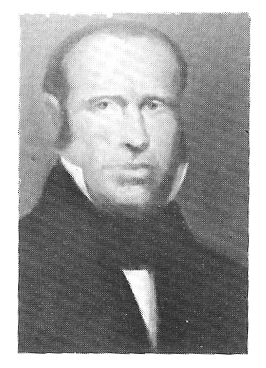

Third Speaker of the Indiana House of Representatives
- In office December 7, 1818 – January 22, 1820
- Preceded by: Amos Lane
- Succeeded by: William Graham
- Constituency: Jefferson County

Personal details
- Born: December 25, 1781 Mercer County, Kentucky
- Died: November 11, 1854 (aged 72) Hanover, Indiana, U.S.
- Party: Independent, Whig
- Spouse(s): Miriam Wilson Dunn (1806-1827); Mary Fleming Dunn (1829-1854)

Williamson Dunn (December 25, 1781 – November 11, 1854) was an American judge and politician in the early history of Indiana. He served as the third Speaker of the Indiana House of Representatives. Dunn is credited with having founded the town of Hanover, Indiana, as well as having contributed funds towards the founding of Hanover College.

Dunn was born near Danville, Kentucky. He was the son of Samuel Dunn, a Scots-Irish Presbyterian immigrant who originally settled in Rockingham County, Virginia, and served in Lord Dunmore's War and the Revolutionary War.

In 1806, Williamson Dunn married Miriam Wilson in Garrard County, Kentucky. In 1809, the Dunns moved to Hanover, Indiana Territory with two children and three slaves. Dunn had inherited these slaves from his father, but due to his personal opposition to slavery, he brought them to Indiana to free them. Dunn would live most of the rest of his life in Hanover.

In 1811, Governor of Indiana Territory William Henry Harrison appointed Dunn as a Justice of the Peace and as Judge of the Court of Common Pleas of Jefferson County. In 1812, during the War of 1812, U.S. President James Madison commissioned Dunn as the captain of a company of mounted rangers. Dunn's company served in Indiana during the war, raiding and capturing Native American towns on the White, Wabash, and Mississinewa Rivers, and also fought at Fort Harrison to relieve regulars under Zachary Taylor.

After the war, Dunn became a farmer and Elder of a Presbyterian church in Madison. In 1814, Governor Thomas Posey appointed Dunn as Associate Judge of the Jefferson County Circuit Court. He left the bench in 1816 upon being re-elected to the Indiana House of Representatives. He was re-elected to the House several times and served as Speaker of the House from 1818 to 1820. In 1820, President James Monroe appointed Dunn Register of the Land Office in Terre Haute. In 1823, the office was moved to Crawfordsville. While serving as Register, Dunn lived in Crawfordsville until he left the position in 1829, returning to Hanover. In 1832, Dunn ran for a seat in the Indiana Senate, but was defeated by David Hillis (who served under Dunn during the War of 1812), partially because Dunn's views on temperance were unpopular. In 1837, Hillis resigned his seat in the Senate to become Lieutenant Governor of Indiana, and Dunn was chosen to fill his vacant seat. In 1843, Jefferson County Whigs nominated Dunn as their candidate for another state senate race. Dunn won this race, defeating Democrat Jesse D. Bright and fellow Whig Shadrach Wilber. In 1846, Dunn was elected Probate Judge of Jefferson County. He was re-elected to this position and served until the office was abolished.

Dunn donated land upon which was built two prominent Indiana colleges, Hanover College and Wabash College. The sons and grandsons of Dunn served in the Mexican–American War and in the American Civil War. His son, William McKee Dunn, served in the U.S. House of Representatives and as Judge Advocate General of the United States Army.
