= Benjamin Ferguson (Indiana politician) =

Indiana politician

Member of the Indiana House of Representatives
- In office November 4, 1816 – December 7, 1818
- Preceded by: Position Established
- Succeeded by: Samuel Conner
- Constituency: Clark County
- In office December 5, 1831 – December 2, 1833
- Preceded by: John Zenor
- Succeeded by: Jacob Angle
- Constituency: Clark County
- In office December 5, 1836 – December 3, 1838
- Preceded by: Shepherd Whitman
- Succeeded by: George H. Proffit
- Constituency: Clark County

Personal details
- Born: January 31, 1791 Culpeper County, Virginia
- Died: December 24, 1839
- Spouse: Sarah Delphine Ferguson
- Children: 5
- Occupation: Politician; Attorney

Benjamin Ferguson was an Indiana politician and attorney who served six non-consecutive terms in the Indiana House of Representatives in the period from 1816 and 1838.

== Biography ==
Benjamin Ferguson was born in Culpeper County, Virginia on January 31, 1791. Little is known about his life in Virginia, but as an adult he moved to Clark County, Indiana and shortly thereafter purchased a homestead. He married Sarah Ferguson (née Hay) in April 1816 and likely built their shared home the same year, now known as the Benjamin Ferguson House. Later that year, he was elected for the first time to the Indiana House of Representatives and served the first of what would eventually be six non-consecutive terms from 1816 to 1818, 1831–1833, and 1836–1838.

Ferguson died on December 24, 1839.
