= William Prince (politician) =

American politician (1772–1824)

Member of the U.S. House of Representatives from Indiana's 1st district
- In office March 4, 1823 – September 8, 1824
- Preceded by: District created
- Succeeded by: Jacob Call

Member of the Indiana House of Representatives from the ? district
- In office 1821–1822

Member of the Indiana Senate
- In office 1816–1816

Personal details
- Born: 1772 Ireland
- Died: September 8, 1824 (aged 51–52) Indiana, U.S.
- Party: Democratic-Republican

Military service
- Branch/service: U.S. Army
- Years of service: 1811
- Rank: Captain
- Battles/wars: Battle of Tippecanoe

William Prince (1772 – September 8, 1824) was a U.S. representative from Indiana.

Born in Ireland in 1772, Prince immigrated to the United States in 1796 and settled in Indiana. He studied law. He served as Commissioner for Gibson County, Indiana, and drew the winning lot to become the county seat's namesake in 1814. Prince served in the Indiana Territorial Council. He then served as territorial auditor. He served in the State senate in 1816. Prince also served as state circuit judge. He served as delegate to the State constitutional convention in 1816. He served as captain in the Battle of Tippecanoe. He served as member of the State house of representatives in 1821 and 1822. He was elected as a Democratic-Republican to the Eighteenth Congress and served from March 4, 1823, until his death near Princeton, Indiana, September 8, 1824. He was interred in the Old Cemetery, near Princeton.

Princeton, Indiana is named for him.

== See also ==
- List of members of the United States Congress who died in office (1790–1899)

U.S. House of Representatives
Preceded by District created	Member of the U.S. House of Representatives from Indiana's 1st congressional district March 4, 1823 - September 8, 1824	Succeeded by Jacob Call
