= Thomas Carr Sr. (Indiana politician) =

Indiana politician

Member of the Indiana House of Representatives from Clark County
- In office November 4, 1816 – December 7, 1818
- Preceded by: Office Established
- Succeeded by: Joseph Bartholomew

Personal details
- Born: Thomas Carr; June 23, 1755 Maryland
- Died: October 26, 1822 Charlestown, Indiana, US
- Spouse: Hannah Coombs Carr
- Children: Thomas Carr Jr.
- Relatives: Andrew Jackson Carr
- Occupation: Farmer; Soldier; Politician

Thomas Carr Sr. was an Indiana politician, soldier, and founding father of Indiana.

== Biography ==
Thomas Carr Sr. was born on June 23, 1755, in the Maryland Colony. He served in the Continental Army during the American Revolution and later in the United States Army during the Indian Wars. In 1806, he moved to Clark County, Indiana and became an active member in Indiana state politics.

In 1816, Carr served as a member of the Indiana Constitutional Convention and later that year as a member of the Indiana House of Representatives from Clark County. He was served for two terms, with the second ending on December 7, 1818. His son Thomas Carr Jr. and grandson Andrew Jackson Carr would later go on to serve in the Indiana House of Representatives as well.

Carr died on October 26, 1822, at the age of 67.
