= Erasmus Powell =

Indiana politician

Member of the Indiana House of Representatives
- In office November 4, 1816 – December 1, 1817
- Preceded by: Position Established
- Succeeded by: Samuel Conner
- Constituency: Dearborn County
- In office December 29, 1817 – December 6, 1819
- Preceded by: Walter Wilson
- Succeeded by: Allen Crisler

Member of the Indiana House of Representatives
- In office November 27, 1820 – December 2, 1822
- Preceded by: Joseph Warner
- Succeeded by: William Goforth Armstrong
- Constituency: Dearborn and Ripley County

Member of the Indiana House of Representatives
- In office December 5, 1836 – December 4, 1837
- Preceded by: Shepherd Whitman
- Succeeded by: George H. Proffit
- Constituency: Shelby County
- In office December 3, 1838 – December 2, 1839
- Preceded by: Ward W. Williams
- Succeeded by: John Flint

Personal details
- Born: December 25, 1788
- Died: February 28, 1843
- Party: Whig Party
- Spouse(s): Elizabeth (née Bonham) Powell; Polly (née Allen) Powell
- Children: 15
- Occupation: Politician

Erasmus Powell was an Indiana politician who served seven non-consecutive terms in the Indiana House of Representatives between 1816 and 1838.

== Biography ==
Ereasmus Powell was born on December 25, 1788, in Pennsylvania. Little is known about his early life, but as an adult he moved to Shelby County, Indiana and married Elizabeth (née Bonham) Powell in August 1807. The couple had four children together before Elizabeth's death in 1815. He remarried later that year to Polly (née Allen) Powell, and over the course of their marriage the couple had eleven children together.

In November 1916, Powell was elected for the first time to the Indiana House of Representatives in its inaugural session. He would go on to serve a total of seven terms, not all consecutive, representing at various times Dearborn, Ripley, and Shelby counties.

Powell died on February 25, 1843.
