= Amos Lane =

American politician (1778–1849)

Speaker of the Indiana House of Representatives
- In office 1839–1840

Member of the U.S. House of Representatives from Indiana's 4th district
- In office March 4, 1833 – March 3, 1837
- Preceded by: District established
- Succeeded by: George H. Dunn

Indiana House of Representatives
- In office 1816–1822

Personal details
- Born: March 1, 1778 Aurora, New York, U.S.
- Died: September 2, 1849 (aged 71) Lawrenceburg, Indiana, U.S.
- Party: Jacksonian
- Occupation: Attorney

Amos Lane (March 1, 1778 – September 2, 1849) was an American lawyer and politician who served two terms as a U.S. representative from Indiana from 1833 to 1837. His youngest son, James Henry Lane, was a controversial figure during the Bleeding Kansas struggles prompted by the Kansas-Nebraska Act of 1854, as well as the commander of the Kansas Brigade effecting the emancipation of slaves in Missouri during the American Civil War.

== Early life and education ==
Amos Lane was descended from Scotch-Irish American colonialists who had originally settled in the Pennsylvanians, some of whom emigrated to New York. Amos Lane was born in that state on March 1, 1779. There he labored on his father's farm in his boyhood, and was apprenticed at the age of 14 to a millwright, serving four years.

Lane studied law for two years (1803–1805) and was admitted to the bar in Ogdensburg, New York. He soon married a widow, Mrs. Mary Howes, daughter of Revolutionary War veteran John Foote. Mary, of Puritan stock, who had received as superb an education available to an American white woman of her day. The Foote side of the family included a Connecticut governor and a U.S. Senator.

The couple left New York in 1807 and ultimately settled in Lawrenceburg, Indiana, Dearborn County on the Ohio River. Amos and Mary had seven children, six of whom reached maturity, comprising three sons and three daughters. The sons had promising or notable careers. John Foote Lane (1810–1936) was a West Point graduate and studied law with William Wirt. He organized and led a regiment of Creek and Cherokee Indians, and died fighting in the Seminole Wars. George W. Lane was a successful merchant, railroad director, and newspaper publisher.

Lane's youngest son, James Henry Lane played key political and military roles in establishing Kansas Territory as a free state and advancing Abraham Lincoln’s emancipation policies freeing slaves in Missouri during the American Civil War.

== Political career ==
Lane, a staunch supporter of Democratic-Republican President Thomas Jefferson, was denied admission to the Dearborn bar by a county administrator and judge who were partisan Federalists. Lane took his family to the state of Kentucky, and after several moves, settled briefly in Burlington, Kentucky in Boone County, where he was granted a license to practice law in 1814. Shortly thereafter, the political situation shifted in Lawrenceburg and there he embarked on a successful practice as a criminal lawyer .

Assigned as prosecuting attorney for Dearborn county in 1815, his political and legal career advanced, and he was elected to Indiana's lower house of congress in 1816, where he was frequently selected as a committee chairman. In 1817, he was selected as the speaker of the Indiana house of representatives. Lane was elected as a Jacksonian to the Twenty-third and Twenty-fourth Congresses (March 4, 1833 – March 3, 1837). He was an unsuccessful candidate for reelection in 1836 to the Twenty-fifth Congress.

Initially in favor of internal improvements during his early legislative tenure, he supported John Quincy Adams and Henry Clay in the 1824 United States presidential election, but switched his allegiance to Andrew Jackson and the Democratic Party after 1828. As such, he supported the dismantling of the Second Bank of the United States, while emerging as a leading proponent of Democratic Party policy in southeastern Indiana. Lane would remain “an influential man in the Democratic party for more than a quarter of a century” according to historian Wendell Holmes Stephenson.

Judge O. F. Roberts, of Aurora, Indiana ranked Amos Lane's oratorical skills second only to contemporaries Thomas Corwin and Henry Clay:

He was full six feet tall, of erect and commanding stature, and possessed a voice of remarkable force and power…his language was ready and fluid, and being master of invective in a marked degree, woe the man who incurred his displeasure.

Roberts added: “He could express more sarcasm and bitterness by his manner of speaking than any man I ever heard before an audience.”

== Later life ==
He resumed the practice of law. He was again a member of the Indiana House of Representatives in 1839 and served as speaker.

Amos Lane died in Lawrenceburg, Indiana, September 2, 1849. He was interred in the Lawrenceburg Cemetery. He was reinterred in Greendale Cemetery.

== Sources ==
- Stephenson, Wendell Holmes. 1930. The Political Career of James H. Lane. Volume 3. Kansas Historical Society, Topeka, Kansas. Doctoral dissertation, William O. Lynch, doctoral publication 13-1054.

U.S. House of Representatives
Preceded by District created	Member of the U.S. House of Representatives from Indiana's 4th congressional district 1833-1837	Succeeded by George H. Dunn
