= Christopher Harrison (politician) =

American politician

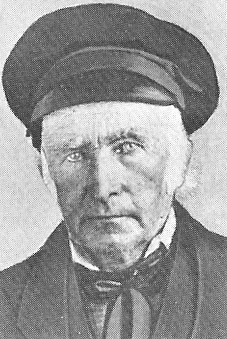

1st Lieutenant Governor of Indiana
- In office November 7, 1816 – December 17, 1818
- Governor: Jonathan Jennings
- Preceded by: Position established
- Succeeded by: Ratliff Boon

Personal details
- Born: c. 1780 Cambridge, Maryland
- Died: 1868 (aged 87–88) Talbot County, Maryland
- Party: Democratic-Republican
- Education: St. John's College

Christopher Harrison (1780–1868) was the first lieutenant governor of Indiana, serving alongside Governor Jonathan Jennings. Harrison briefly acted as governor while Jennings was engaged in negotiations with the native tribes in northern Indiana. He later resigned from office following a dispute with Jennings. Harrison became a Quaker in his later life and freed all the slaves he inherited from his family. He lived a long life for his era, and died at age 88. There is no known relationship between Harrison, and an early territorial governor of Indiana and president of the United States, William Henry Harrison.

== Early life ==
Christopher Harrison was born in Cambridge, Maryland sometime around 1780, the son of Colonel Robert Harrison and Milcah Gale who were important and wealthy land owners. He attended St. John's College in Annapolis, Maryland. After his graduation Harrison worked as a clerk for William Patterson, the president of the Bank of Baltimore and became a tutor for Patterson's daughter, Elizabeth. Hoosier tradition holds that Harrison courted Elizabeth and she at one point promised to marry him. However the match was opposed by her father who forced her to break off the engagement. Harrison secretly continued to carry on a love affair with Elizabeth for some time. In 1803, Elizabeth was introduced to Jérôme Bonaparte who was visiting Baltimore with the French Ambassador. Elizabeth eventually married Jérôme Bonaparte by whom she had a child. After a brief marriage Jerome abandoned Elizabeth at the request of his brother Napoleon Bonaparte, the Emperor of the French. Harrison considered his reputation tarnished from this affair and he left Maryland and moved to Indiana around 1808. He settled near Hanover, Indiana where he lived for five years as a hermit in his cabin with only a dog for company.

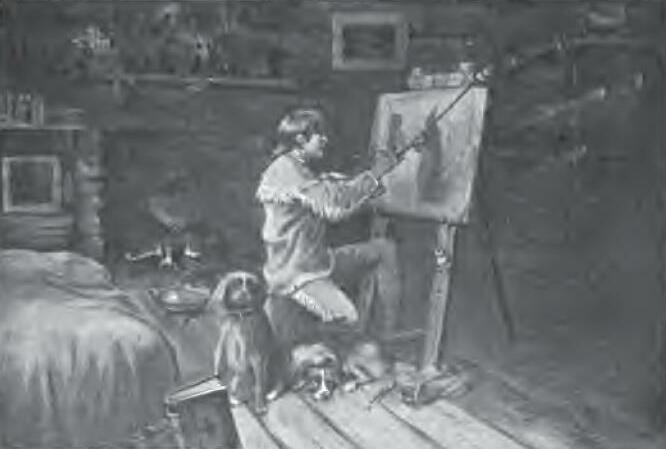
Christopher Harrison painting in his cabin while still living as hermit near Hanover, Indiana, depicted in the book Stories of Indiana, by Maurice Thompson

As settlers begin to move into the territory, Harrison began to emerge from his hermitage. He was one of the founding investors of 1814 to establish the Farmers and Mechanics Bank, located in Madison, one of the first two banks in Indiana Territory. He sold his cabin in 1815 to George Logan and moved to Salem, Indiana where he opened a business in partnership with Jonathan Lyons selling dry goods. He served a one-year term as Judge of Washington County on the circuit court of the Indiana Territory.

== Political career ==
In 1816, Jonathan Jennings was elected as Governor of Indiana, and he had convinced Harrison to run as his lieutenant governor. Harrison won the election defeating John Vawter and becoming Lieutenant Governor of Indiana. In 1817, Harrison became one of the founding members of the Grand Lodge of Indiana. In 1818, Jennings left the capitol to conduct negotiations on behalf of the federal government with the native tribes in northern Indiana. While he was gone, Harrison was left as acting governor.

Harrison became involved in a scandal when Jennings returned by refusing to vacate the governorship, claiming Jennings' actions had violated the state constitution and that Jennings was no longer eligible to be governor. The constitution forbade members of the state government to hold any position in the federal government at the same time. Harrison seized the state seal and set up his own governor's office from where he attempted to run the state. After a brief period of wrangling in the state legislature, the impeachment proceedings against Jennings failed and Harrison was forced to vacate the governors position and it was returned to Jennings. Harrison became very angry with the outcome and promptly resigned his position as governor in a brief letter stating: "As the officers of the executive department of government and the General Assembly have refused to recognize and acknowledge that authority which according to my understanding is constitutionally attached to the office the name itself in my estimation is not worth retaining."

The legislature accepted his resignation and passed a resolution stating: "That the House of Representatives view the conduct and deportment of Lieutenant Governor Christopher Harrison as both dignified and correct during the late investigation of the differences existing in the executive department of this State."

Harrison ran against Jennings in the 1819 campaign for governor, but was soundly defeated 9,168–2,088.

Jennings was conciliatory towards Harrison, and in 1821 Harrison was appointed as a member of the committee who platted Indianapolis for the new state capitol. Harrison was the only member of the commission who arrived on time to the location that was sixty miles into the wilderness. The other commissioners were long delayed in reaching the site, and Harrison, being a practical man, decided he formed a majority of the present commissioners and voted to begin laying out the town without them. He choose Alexander Ralston, who had been an assistant to Pierre Charles L’Enfant, to survey the site.

In 1824 Harrison was again part of a commission that studied the possibility of building a canal around the Falls of the Ohio near Clarksville, Indiana. The commission ended after creating a report and a canal was built on the Kentucky side of the Ohio River using federal funds before Indiana could begin construction.

== Later life ==
After his short public career Harrison returned to Salem. There Harrison lived a relatively reclusive life. His home was known in the community for his many flowers, and his friendliness to the local children. Harrison was also an artist and he created many works of art including several portraits of several early Hoosiers. Some of his portraits are on display in the Indiana State Library and in the Indiana State Museum.

Sometime after his father's death in 1802, Harrison sold his land in Salem on January 10, 1834, and returned to Maryland where he inherited his family's plantation which he maintained with his sister, Elizabeth Harrison Skinner, for several years. Upon taking ownership Harrison freed all of his family's slaves. Harrison joined a Quaker church during the 1840s. Harrison died at age 88 in 1868 in Talbot County, Maryland. Harrison never married.

== See also ==
- History of Indiana

Political offices
Preceded by office established	Lieutenant Governor of Indiana; 1816 – 1818	Succeeded by Ratliff Boon
