= Seal of Indiana =

Official government emblem of the U.S. state of Indiana

Seal of the State of Indiana
- Armiger: State of Indiana
- Adopted: 1816 (standardized 1963)
- Designer: William Henry Harrison

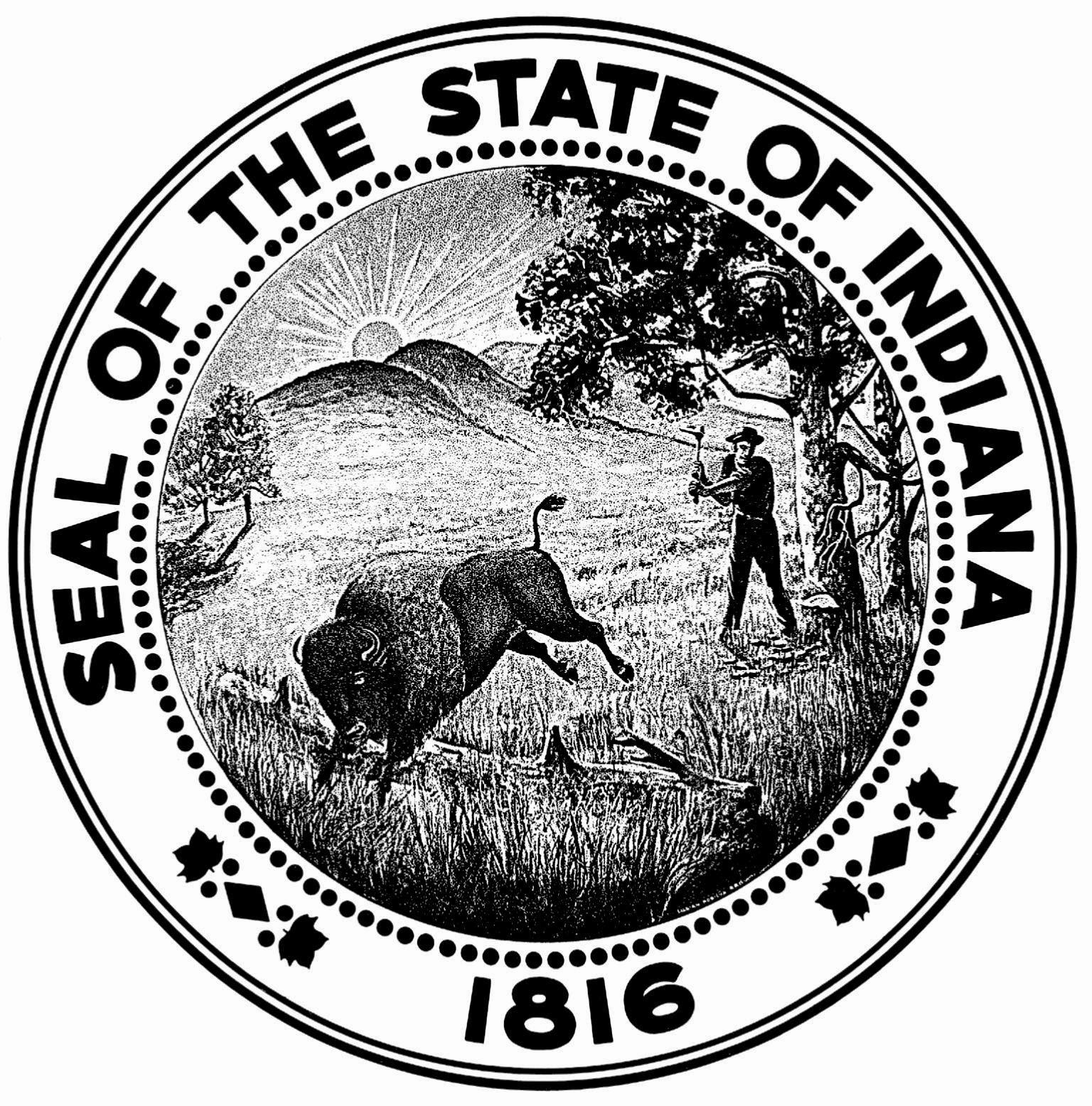
Black and white illustration of the state seal.

The seal of Indiana is used by the governor of Indiana to certify official documents of the U.S. state of Indiana. The seal has gone through several revisions since the region was a part of the Northwest Territory. It is likely that the original seal, which is similar to the current one, was created by William Henry Harrison during his administration of the Indiana Territory. The current design of the seal was standardized by the Indiana General Assembly in 1963.

== Usage ==
The state seal is maintained by the Governor of Indiana. It is used to certify the authenticity of official state documents. The seal is placed on departmental reports, bills the Governor signs into law, and official communications from the Governor to other high-ranking office holders. The seal is also used on all commissions granted by the state as proof of the commission's authority.

The first Indiana state flag utilizes the state seal in its design. An American Civil War era 13th Indiana Infantry Regiment battle flag also utilizes the state seal in its design.

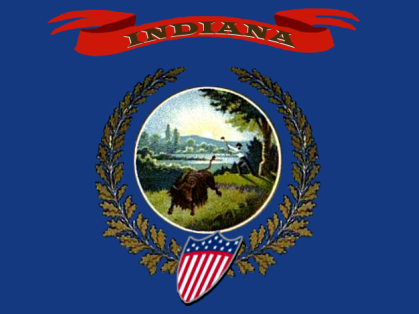
First flag of Indiana (1885–1917)

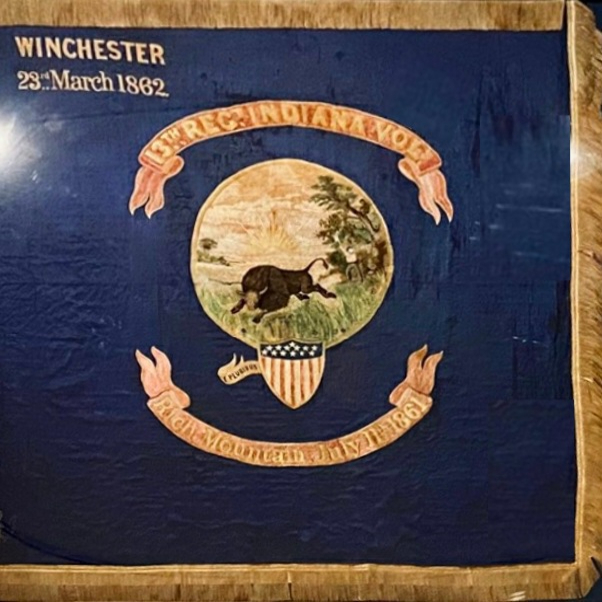
13th Indiana Infantry Regiment battle flag

== History ==
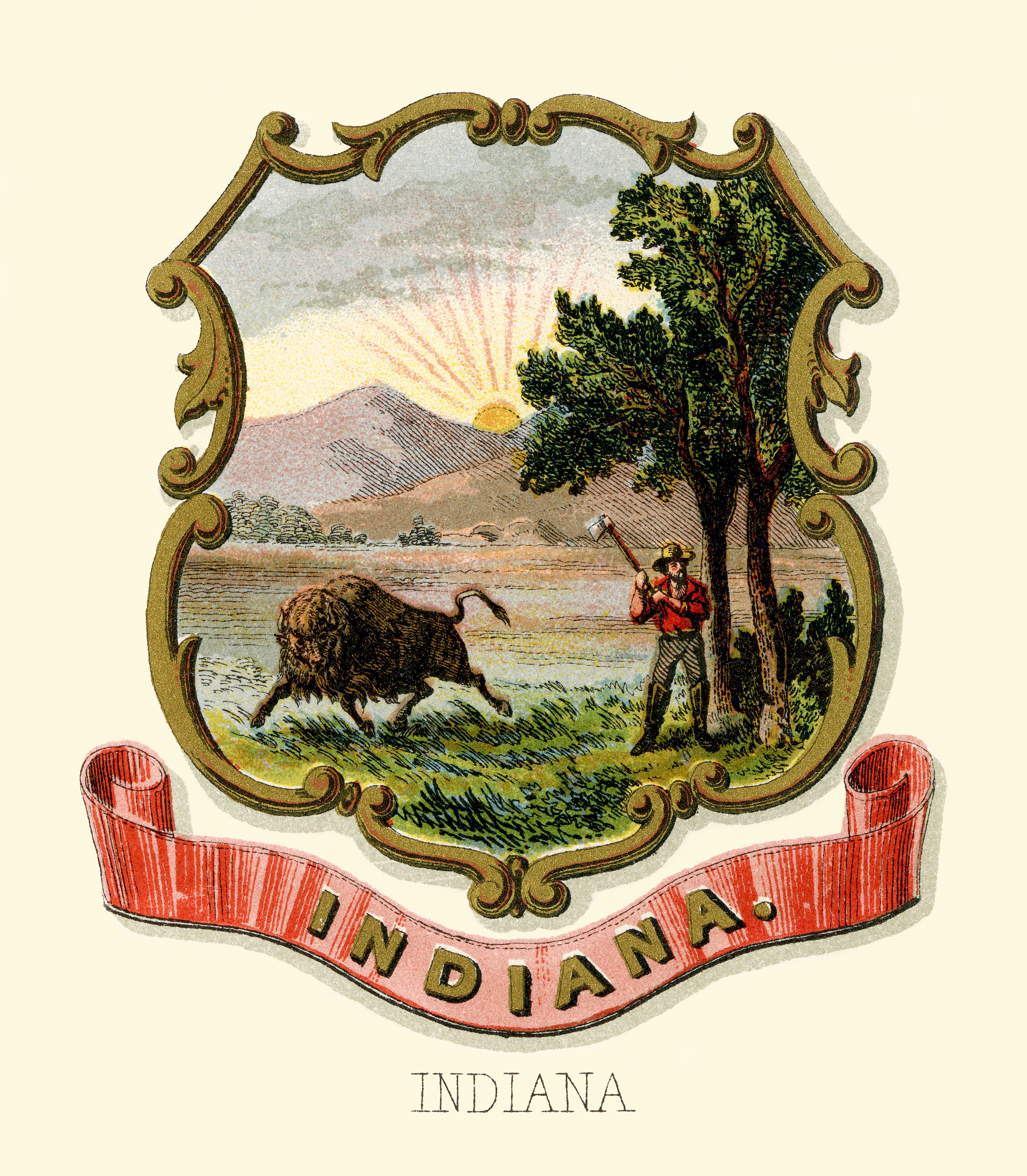
Indiana state historical coat of arms (illustrated, 1876)

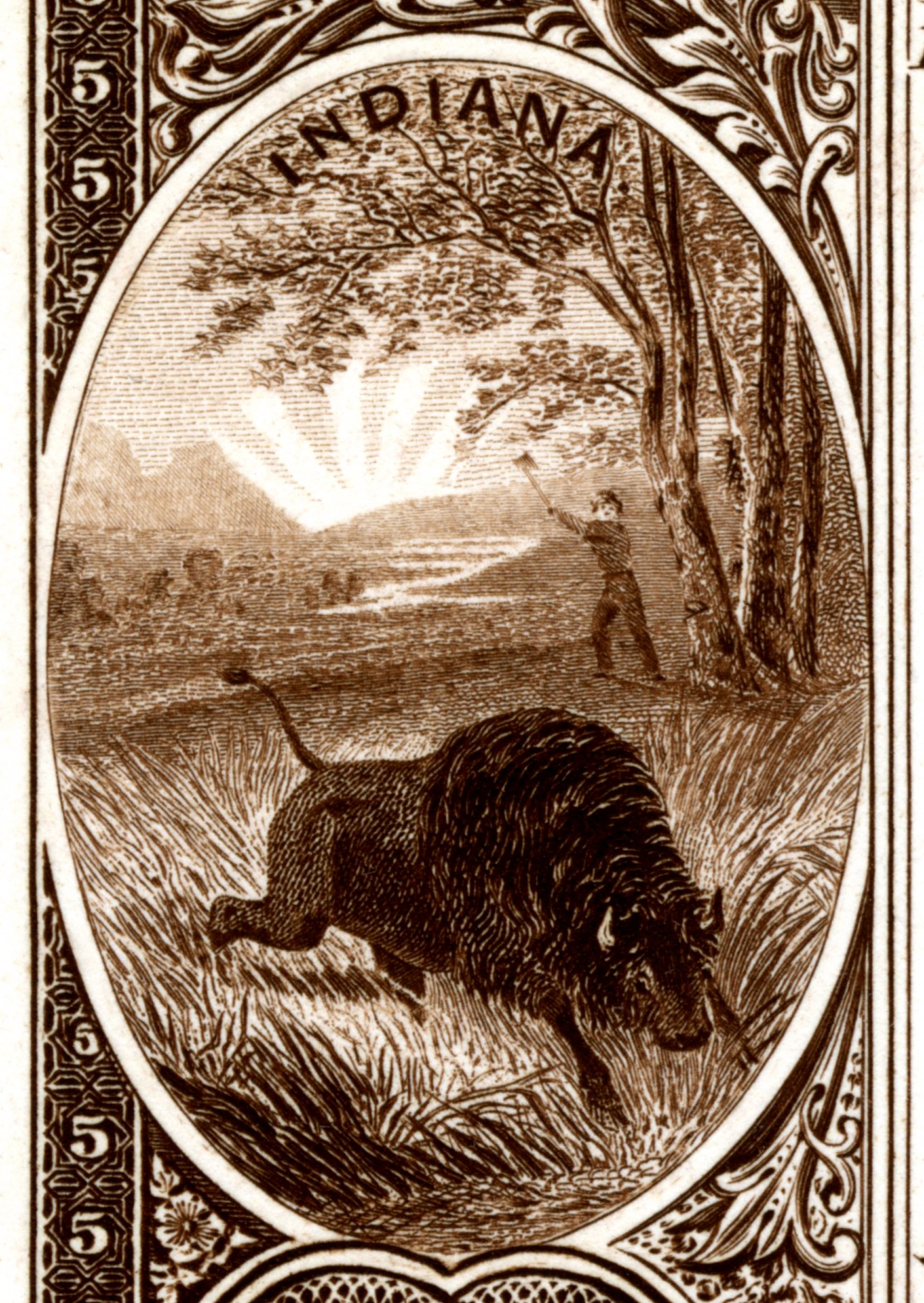
Indiana state seal depicted on the reverse of Series 1882BB National Bank Notes.

The United States Congress passed legislation on May 8, 1792, that directed the U.S. Secretary of State to "provide proper seals for the several and respective public offices in the said Territories". Indiana was part of the Northwest Territory at that time and a seal was created by the United States Department of State to be used on official papers of the territory. The original seal was maintained by Governor Arthur St. Clair and the first recorded use was in a proclamation made on July 26, 1788.

On May 10, 1800, the Indiana Territory was created by an act of Congress, but no provision for an official seal was included in the measure. The earliest recorded use of Indiana Territory's seal was on court documents that were signed by Governor William Henry Harrison in January 1801. The seal he used was an adaptation of the original seal created for the Northwest Territory. Although its origin is uncertain, it is likely that it was Harrison who made the alterations.

The constitution of 1816 contained a clause that stated the governor should maintain a state seal and use it in official communication. The design of the seal was first proposed during the first session of the Indiana General Assembly in 1816. On November 22, 1816, representative Davis Floyd of Harrison County proposed the adoption of a seal with a design he referred to as "A forest and a woodman felling a tree, a buffalo leaving the forest and fleeing through the plain to a distant forest, and sun in the west with the word Indiana." The bill was put through a joint conference of both houses of the General Assembly and funds where voted to purchase a printer to create the seal.

In 1819, the state seal was part of a state crisis. Lieutenant Governor Christopher Harrison became acting-governor when Governor Jonathan Jennings was away conducting negotiations with northern Indiana's native tribes. When Jennings returned, Harrison refused to step down as governor, claiming that Jennings' actions had invalidated his governorship. Harrison seized the state seal and set up his own governor's office. After several weeks of debate in the state legislature, Harrison was forced to return the seal to Jennings and vacate the office of the governor.

During 1895, Robert S. Hatcher, the reading clerk of the Indiana Senate, was directed to ascertain the legal status of the design of the state seal. After a thorough review, Hatcher found that the laws that authorized the seal did not explicitly state what its design should be. He recommended that a bill be passed to standardize the seal. Senator McCord submitted legislation for that purpose, but no action was taken on it.

On January 28, 1905, an article ran in the Indianapolis News containing information on the origin of the seal, some of it dubious. The article received much attention and started an informal inquiry into the history of the seal, and namely to discover if the sun in the seal was rising or setting. Jacob Piatt Dunn, the preeminent Indiana historian of the time, consulted several history and arrived at the conclusion that the sun was rising. Dunn cited the fact the state was young, and the mountains were to the east of the state, not the west—clearly indicating the sun was rising.

The current design of the seal was standardized by the Indiana General Assembly in 1963. During the meeting of the General Assembly, Representative Taylor I. Morris introduced legislation to standardize the design of the state seal. His bill described a seal that depicts a woodsman chopping a sycamore tree, while an American bison runs in the foreground and the sun sets in the background. The leaves of the state tree, the tulip, were to be the border design. The bill passed the assembly that session and became law.

In 2004, the 1963 statute came under criticism because it states the sun in the state seal is setting rather than rising. A thorough investigation by the Indiana Historical Bureau into the history of the seal led to the discovery that original seal was created with the intention that the sun should, in fact, be depicted as rising. In both 2004 and 2005 legislation was introduced to change the wording of the statute, but as of 2008 no action had been taken to correct the error.

== Current statute ==
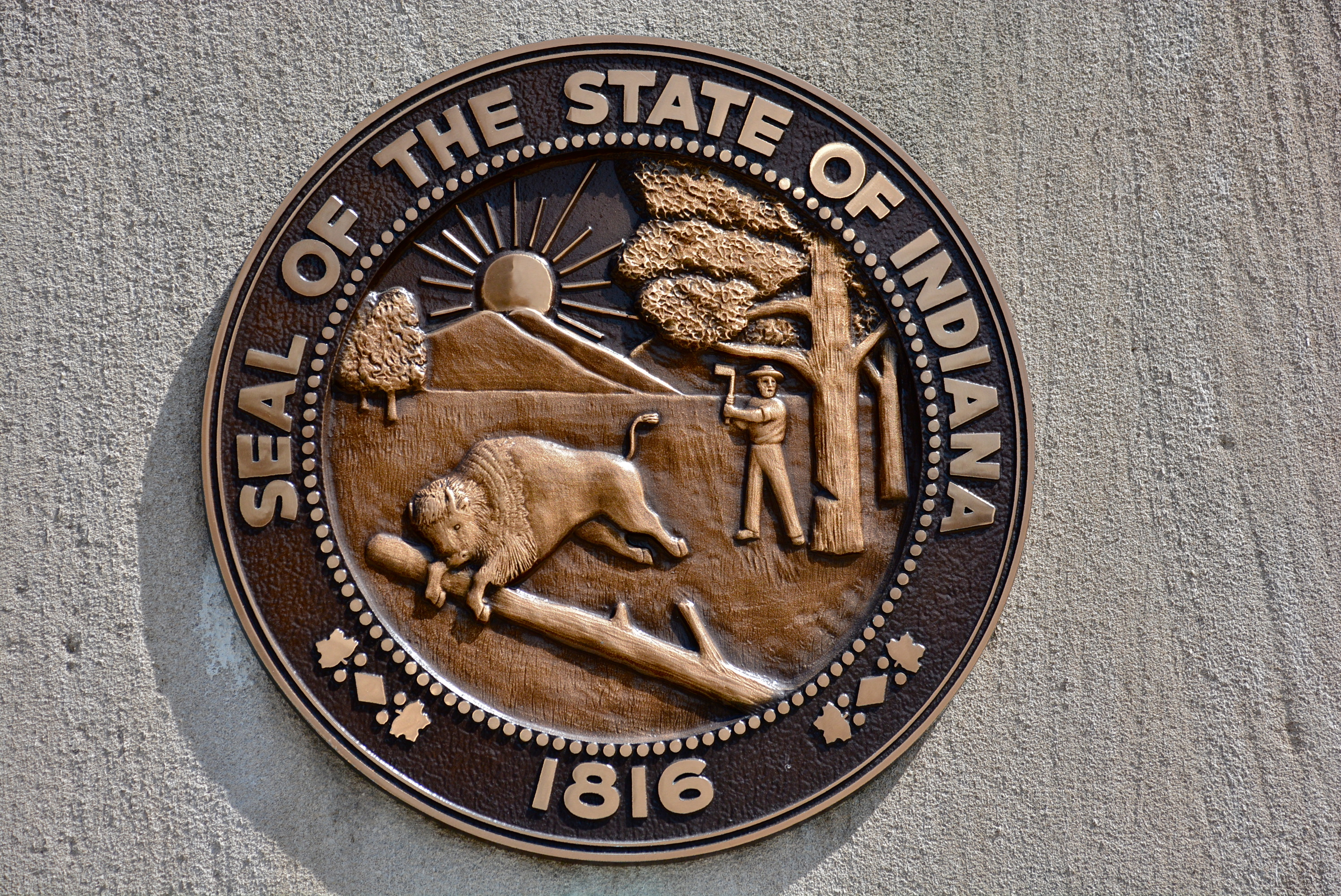
The state seal on the exterior of the Indiana Statehouse.

The law created to standardize the state seal has been in effect since 1963. The statute states:

Indiana State Code: IC 1-2-4-1

The official seal for the state of Indiana shall be described as follows: A perfect circle, two and five eighths (2 5/8) inches in diameter, inclosed by a plain line. Another circle within the first, two and three eighths (2 3/8) inches in diameter inclosed by a beaded line, leaving a margin of one quarter (1/4) of an inch. In the top half of this margin are the words "Seal of the State of Indiana".

At the bottom center, 1816, flanked on either side by a diamond, with two (2) dots and a leaf of the tulip tree (liriodendron tulipifera), at both ends of the diamond. The inner circle has two (2) trees in the left background, three (3) hills in the center background with nearly a full sun setting behind and between the first and second hill from the left.

There are fourteen (14) rays from the sun, starting with two (2) short ones on the left, the third being longer and then alternating, short and long. There are two (2) sycamore trees on the right, the larger one being nearer the center and having a notch cut nearly half way through, from the left side, a short distance above the ground. The woodsman is wearing a hat and holding his ax nearly perpendicular on his right. The ax blade is turned away from him and is even with his hat.

The buffalo is in the foreground, facing to the left of front. His tail is up, front feet on the ground with back feet in the air, as he jumps over a log.

The ground has shoots of blue grass, in the area of the buffalo and woodsman.

== Iconography ==
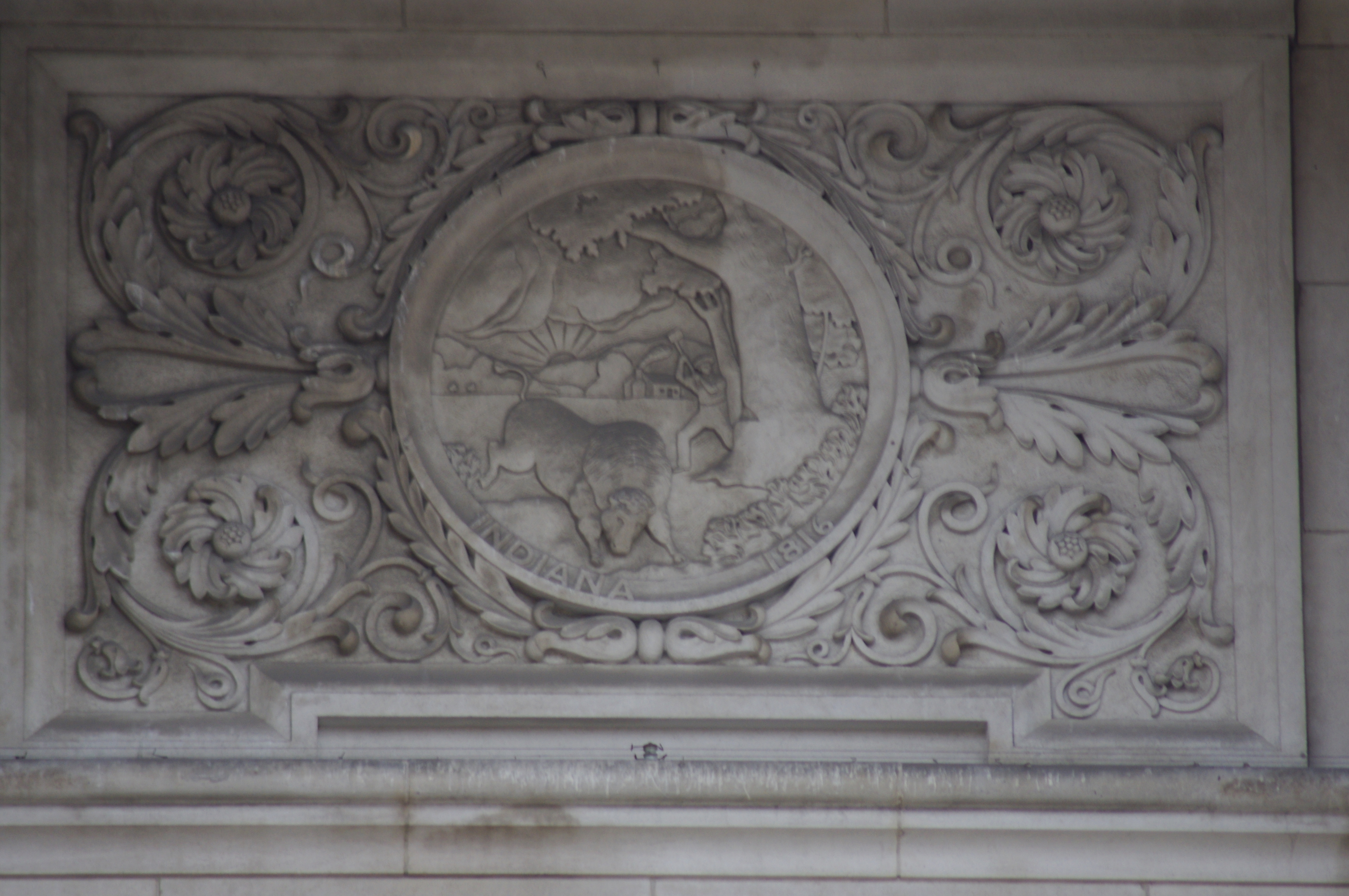
The state seal engraved on the Saints Peter & Paul Cathedral in Indianapolis.

The sun rising in the picture represents that Indiana has a bright future ahead and is just beginning. The mountains it rises over are a representation of the Allegheny Mountains showing that Indiana is in the west. The woodman represents civilization subduing the wilderness that was Indiana. The buffalo represents the wilderness fleeing westward away from the advancing civilization.

== Historical depictions of the seal ==
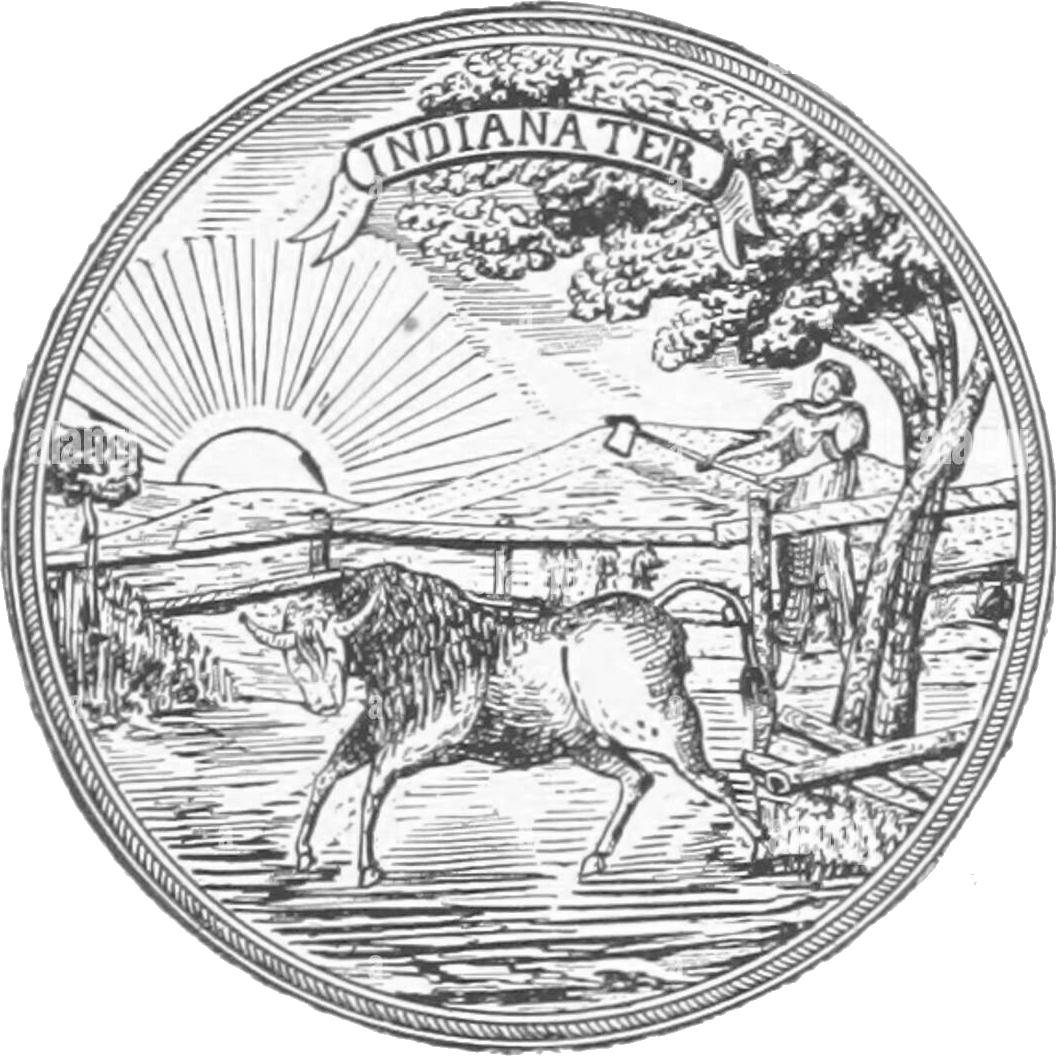
1801–1816

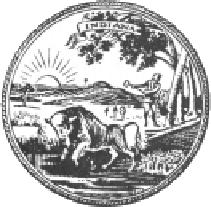
1816

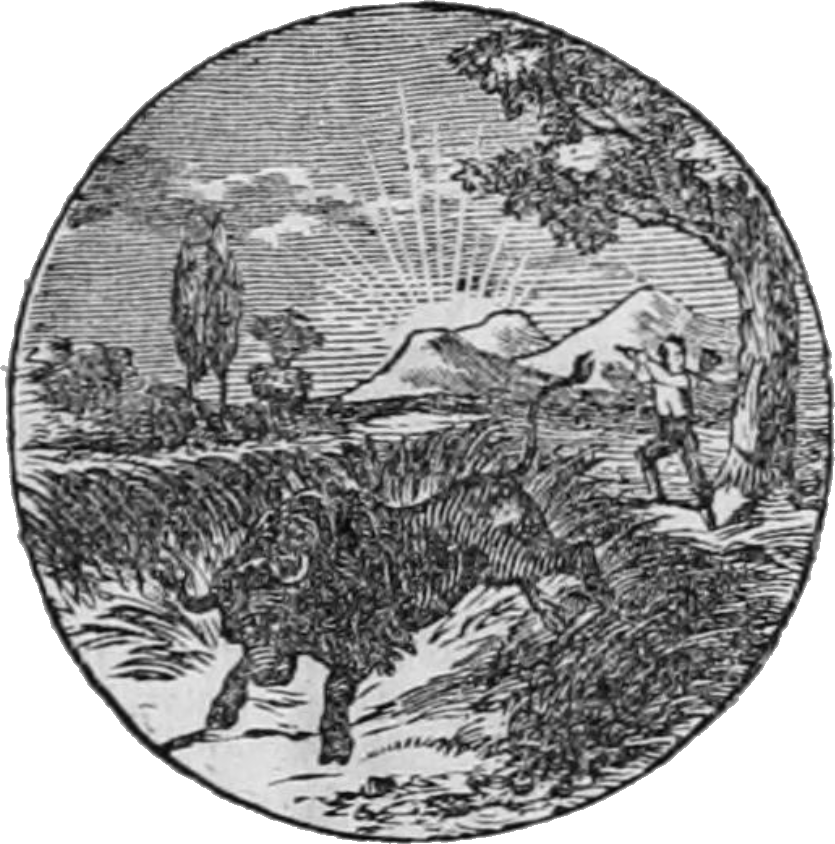
1855

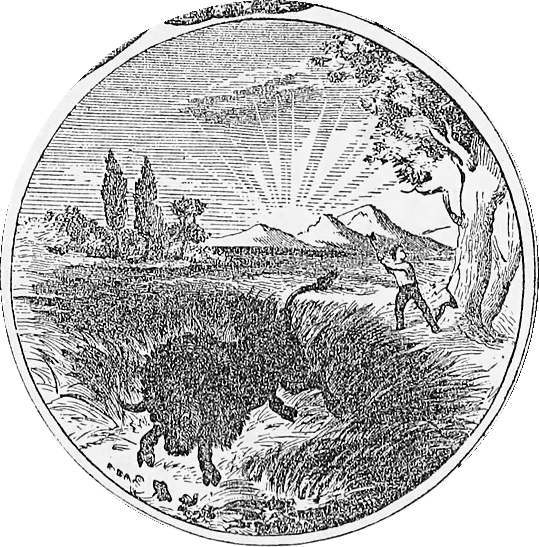
1856

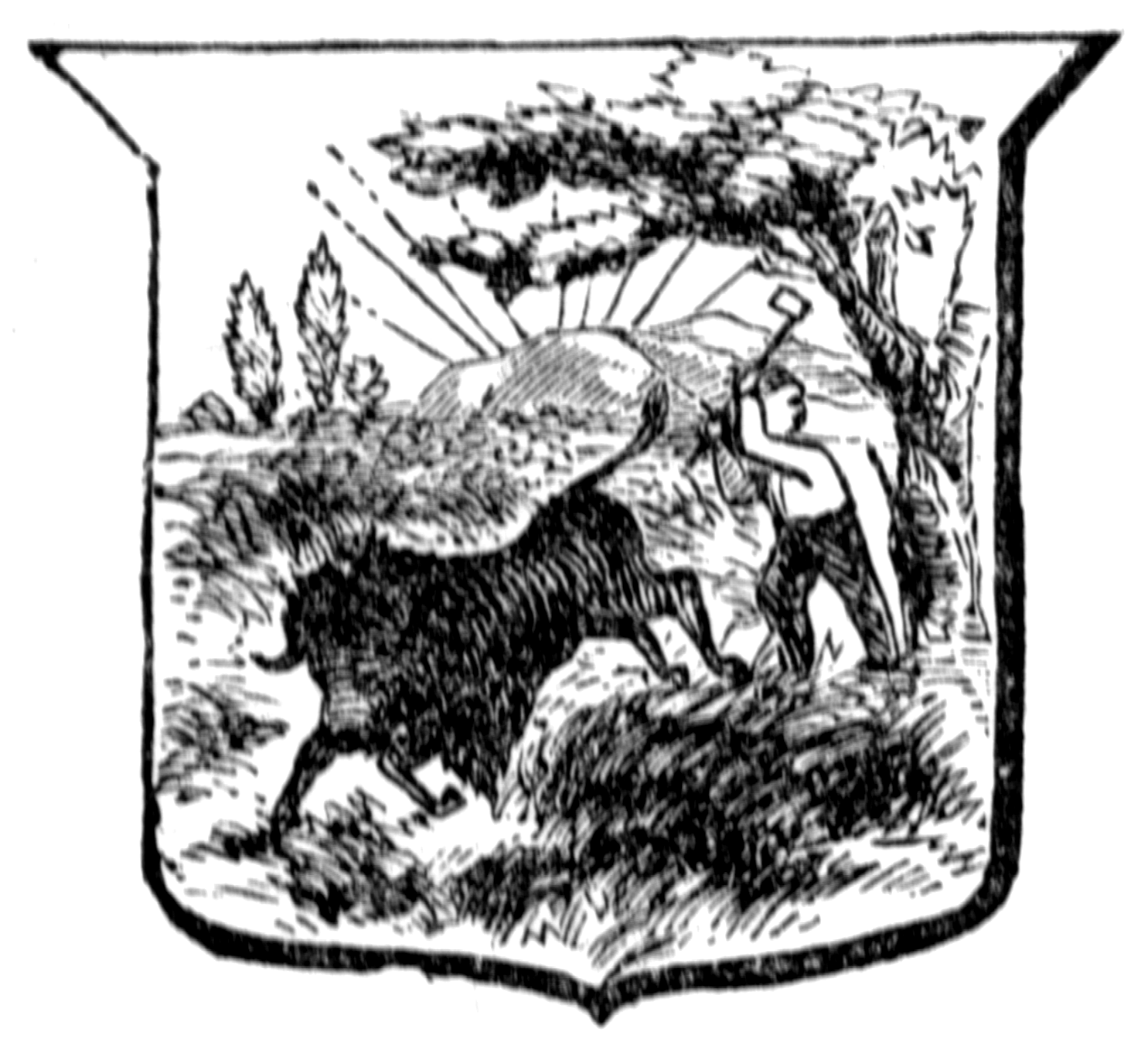
1861

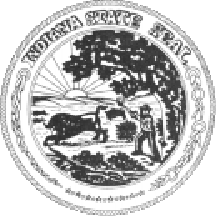
1863

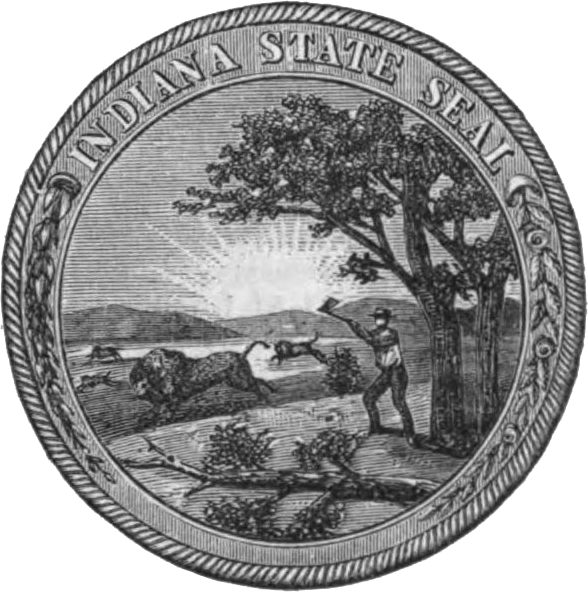
1879

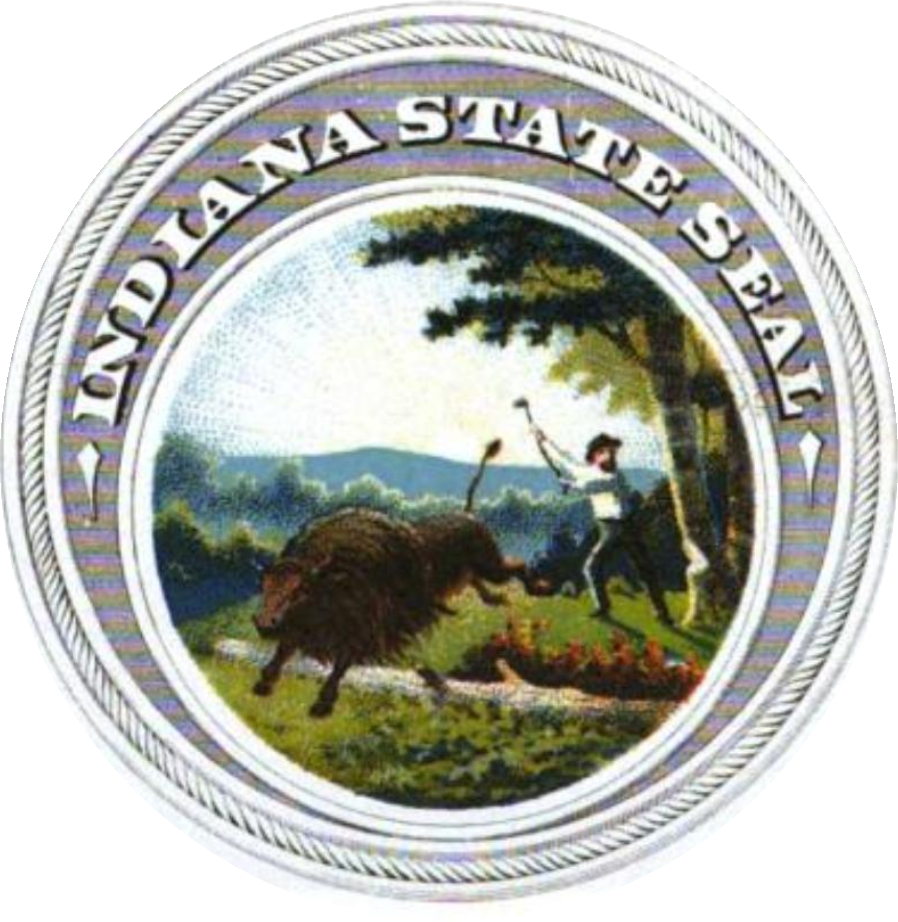
1899

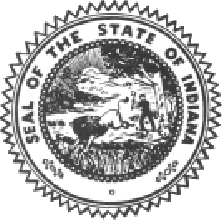
1950

== Governmental seals of Indiana ==
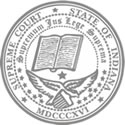
Seal of the Supreme Court of Indiana

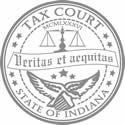
Seal of the Tax Court of Indiana

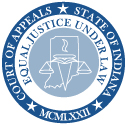
Seal of the Court of Appeals of Indiana

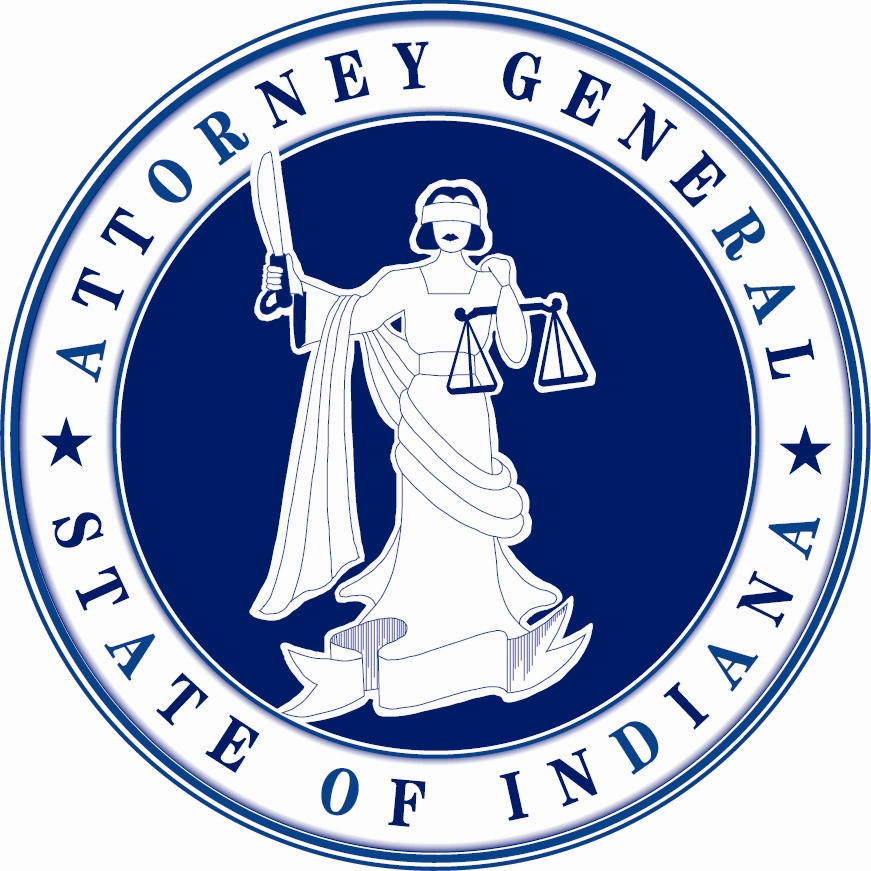
Seal of the Attorney General of Indiana

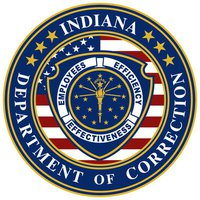
Seal of the Indiana Department of Corrections

Seal of the Indiana Department of Transportation

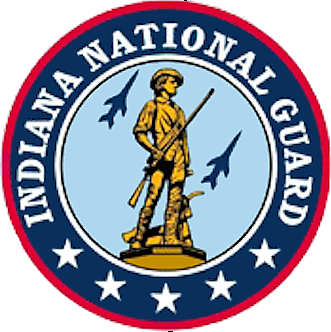
Seal of the Indiana National Guard

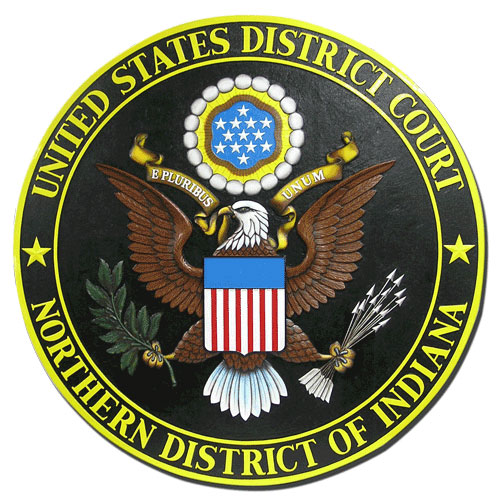
Seal of the Northern District of Indiana

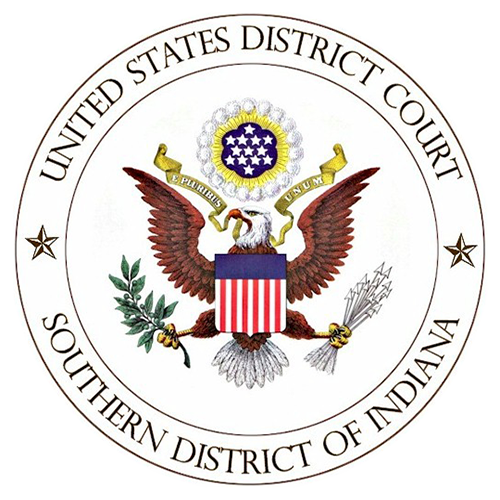
Seal of the Southern District of Indiana

== See also ==
- Flag of Indiana
- List of U.S. state, district, and territorial insignia
