= Politics of Indiana =

Indiana is one of fifty U.S. states. The state is considered a stronghold for the Republican Party who currently control its governorship and legislative branches with supermajorities. The state has supported the Republican candidate in every presidential election since 2012 and previously from 1968 to 2004. Although it narrowly voted Democrat in 2008, it has not been competitive since and is now rated R+11 on the Cook Partisan Voting Index. Indiana was once a swing state in the 19th century and early 20th century, voting for the national winner from 1852 to 1912, with the exception of 1876.

Indiana has elected several Democrats to the U.S. Senate in recent years, with Joe Donnelly serving as a senator until 2019. Certain cities, too, tend to favor Democrats; Gary, Indiana has had a Democratic mayor for the last 77 years. While only five Democratic presidential nominees have carried Indiana since 1900, 11 Democrats were elected governor during that time. Democrats also generally held control of the Indiana House of Representatives during the 1990s and 2000s as well.

== Federal elections ==
=== Presidential elections ===
United States presidential election results for Indiana
| Year | Republican / Whig | | Democratic | | Third party(ies) | |
| Year | No. | % | No. | % | No. | % |
|---|---|---|---|---|---|---|
| 1824 | 3,095 | 19.65% | 7,343 | 46.61% | 5,315 | 33.74% |
| 1828 | 17,052 | 43.38% | 22,257 | 56.62% | 0 | 0.00% |
| 1832 | 15,472 | 32.90% | 31,551 | 67.10% | 0 | 0.00% |
| 1836 | 41,281 | 55.97% | 32,478 | 44.03% | 0 | 0.00% |
| 1840 | 65,302 | 55.86% | 51,604 | 44.14% | 0 | 0.00% |
| 1844 | 67,867 | 48.42% | 70,181 | 50.07% | 2,106 | 1.50% |
| 1848 | 69,907 | 45.77% | 74,745 | 48.93% | 8,100 | 5.30% |
| 1852 | 80,901 | 44.17% | 95,340 | 52.05% | 6,929 | 3.78% |
| 1856 | 94,375 | 40.09% | 118,670 | 50.41% | 22,386 | 9.51% |
| 1860 | 139,033 | 51.09% | 115,509 | 42.44% | 17,601 | 6.47% |
| 1864 | 150,422 | 53.60% | 130,233 | 46.40% | 0 | 0.00% |
| 1868 | 176,552 | 51.39% | 166,980 | 48.61% | 0 | 0.00% |
| 1872 | 186,147 | 53.00% | 163,632 | 46.59% | 1,417 | 0.40% |
| 1876 | 208,011 | 47.39% | 213,526 | 48.65% | 17,374 | 3.96% |
| 1880 | 232,164 | 49.33% | 225,522 | 47.91% | 12,986 | 2.76% |
| 1884 | 238,489 | 48.15% | 245,005 | 49.46% | 11,838 | 2.39% |
| 1888 | 263,361 | 49.05% | 261,013 | 48.61% | 12,575 | 2.34% |
| 1892 | 255,615 | 46.17% | 262,740 | 47.46% | 35,258 | 6.37% |
| 1896 | 323,754 | 50.82% | 305,573 | 47.96% | 7,792 | 1.22% |
| 1900 | 336,063 | 50.60% | 309,584 | 46.62% | 18,447 | 2.78% |
| 1904 | 368,289 | 53.99% | 274,345 | 40.22% | 39,551 | 5.80% |
| 1908 | 348,993 | 48.40% | 338,262 | 46.91% | 33,871 | 4.70% |
| 1912 | 151,267 | 23.11% | 281,890 | 43.07% | 221,317 | 33.82% |
| 1916 | 341,005 | 47.44% | 334,063 | 46.47% | 43,780 | 6.09% |
| 1920 | 696,370 | 55.14% | 511,364 | 40.49% | 55,230 | 4.37% |
| 1924 | 703,042 | 55.25% | 492,245 | 38.69% | 77,103 | 6.06% |
| 1928 | 848,290 | 59.68% | 562,691 | 39.59% | 10,333 | 0.73% |
| 1932 | 677,184 | 42.94% | 862,054 | 54.67% | 37,689 | 2.39% |
| 1936 | 691,570 | 41.89% | 934,974 | 56.63% | 24,353 | 1.48% |
| 1940 | 899,466 | 50.45% | 874,063 | 49.03% | 9,218 | 0.52% |
| 1944 | 875,891 | 52.38% | 781,403 | 46.73% | 14,797 | 0.88% |
| 1948 | 821,079 | 49.58% | 807,833 | 48.78% | 27,302 | 1.65% |
| 1952 | 1,136,259 | 58.11% | 801,530 | 40.99% | 17,536 | 0.90% |
| 1956 | 1,182,811 | 59.90% | 783,908 | 39.70% | 7,888 | 0.40% |
| 1960 | 1,175,120 | 55.03% | 952,358 | 44.60% | 7,882 | 0.37% |
| 1964 | 911,118 | 43.56% | 1,170,848 | 55.98% | 9,640 | 0.46% |
| 1968 | 1,067,885 | 50.29% | 806,659 | 37.99% | 249,053 | 11.73% |
| 1972 | 1,405,154 | 66.11% | 708,568 | 33.34% | 11,807 | 0.56% |
| 1976 | 1,183,958 | 53.32% | 1,014,714 | 45.70% | 21,690 | 0.98% |
| 1980 | 1,255,656 | 56.01% | 844,197 | 37.65% | 142,180 | 6.34% |
| 1984 | 1,377,230 | 61.67% | 841,481 | 37.68% | 14,358 | 0.64% |
| 1988 | 1,297,763 | 59.84% | 860,643 | 39.69% | 10,215 | 0.47% |
| 1992 | 989,375 | 42.91% | 848,420 | 36.79% | 468,076 | 20.30% |
| 1996 | 1,006,693 | 47.13% | 887,424 | 41.55% | 241,725 | 11.32% |
| 2000 | 1,245,836 | 56.65% | 901,980 | 41.01% | 51,486 | 2.34% |
| 2004 | 1,479,438 | 59.94% | 969,011 | 39.26% | 19,553 | 0.79% |
| 2008 | 1,345,648 | 48.81% | 1,374,039 | 49.84% | 36,971 | 1.34% |
| 2012 | 1,422,872 | 54.04% | 1,154,275 | 43.84% | 55,996 | 2.13% |
| 2016 | 1,557,286 | 56.42% | 1,033,126 | 37.43% | 169,963 | 6.16% |
| 2020 | 1,729,863 | 56.91% | 1,242,505 | 40.87% | 67,413 | 2.22% |
| 2024 | 1,720,347 | 58.43% | 1,163,603 | 39.52% | 60,386 | 2.05% |

Former governor and U.S. Senator Evan Bayh announced in 2006 his plans for a presidential exploratory committee. His father was a three-term senator who was turned out of office in the 1980 Reagan Revolution by conservative Republican (and future Vice President) Dan Quayle, a native of Huntington in the northeastern portion of the state. However, Quayle announced that he would not be seeking the Presidency on December 16, 2006.

In the 2008 presidential election, Barack Obama carried the state by 1.03%, which was the first time in 44 years that a Democrat won Indiana's electoral votes, and to date, the last.

=== Congress ===
Seven of the districts favor the Republican Party according to the CPVI rankings; there are currently seven Republicans serving as representatives and two Democrats. Historically, Republicans have been strongest in the eastern and central portions of the state, while Democrats have been strongest in the northwestern part of the state. Occasionally, certain counties in the southern part of the state will vote Democratic. Marion County, Indiana's most populated county, supported the Republican candidates from 1968 to 2000, before backing the Democrats in the 2004 and 2008 elections. Indiana's second most populated county, Lake County, is a strong supporter of the Democratic party that has not voted for a Republican since 1972.

The state's U.S. Senators are Sen. Todd Young (Republican) and Sen. Jim Banks (Republican). In 2006, then-senior Sen. Richard Lugar (Republican) won reelection to a sixth term with 87% of the vote against no major-party opposition. In 2010, Sen. Coats won reelection to a third non-consecutive term with 55% of the vote against Democratic Congressman Brad Ellsworth and Libertarian business owner and teacher Rebecca Sink-Burris.

Senator Lugar lost in the 2012 Republican primary to the state treasurer of Indiana, Richard Mourdock, who had been favored by the Tea Party movement. Joe Donnelly defeated Mourdock in the general election. He later lost re-election in 2018 to former state representative Mike Braun.

Indiana's delegation to the United States House of Representatives is not completely Republican either. Instead, it has generally served as a bellwether for the political movement of the nation. For instance, Democrats held the majority of seats until the 1994 Republican Revolution, when Republicans took a majority. This continued until 2006, when three Republican congressmen were defeated in Indiana; (Chris Chocola, John Hostettler and Mike Sodrel), giving the Democrats a majority of the delegation again.

Historically, Republicans have been strongest in the eastern and central portions of the state, as well as the suburbs of the state's major cities. Democrats have been strongest in the northwestern and southern parts of the state along with the major cities. However, outside of Indianapolis, the Chicago suburbs, and Bloomington, the state's Democrats tend to be somewhat more conservative than their counterparts in the rest of the country, especially on social issues.

== Federal representation ==
Indiana currently has 9 House districts. In the 118th Congress, two of Indiana's seats are held by Democrats and seven are held by Republicans:

- Indiana's 1st congressional district represented by Frank J. Mrvan (D)
- Indiana's 2nd congressional district represented by Rudy Yakym (R)
- Indiana's 3rd congressional district represented by Marlin Stutzman (R)
- Indiana's 4th congressional district represented by Jim Baird (R)
- Indiana's 5th congressional district represented by Victoria Spartz (R)
- Indiana's 6th congressional district represented by Jefferson Shreve (R)
- Indiana's 7th congressional district represented by Andre Carson (D)
- Indiana's 8th congressional district represented by Mark Messmer (R)
- Indiana's 9th congressional district represented by Erin Houchin (R)

Indiana's two United States senators are Republicans Todd Young and Jim Banks, serving since 2017 and 2025, respectively.

Indiana is part of the United States District Court for the Northern District of Indiana and the United States District Court for the Southern District of Indiana in the federal judiciary. The district's cases are appealed to the Chicago-based United States Court of Appeals for the Seventh Circuit.

== See also ==
- Governor of Indiana
- Indiana General Assembly
- Indiana Supreme Court
- Constitution of Indiana
- Political party strength in Indiana
