= Ratliff Boon =

American politician (1781–1844)

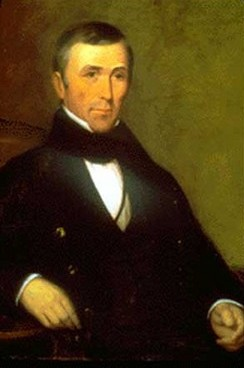
- Posthumous portrait by James Forbes (c.1870)

Member of the U.S. House of Representatives from Indiana's 1st district
- In office March 4, 1829 – March 3, 1839
- Preceded by: Thomas H. Blake
- Succeeded by: George H. Proffit
- In office March 4, 1825 – March 3, 1827
- Preceded by: Jacob Call
- Succeeded by: Thomas H. Blake

2nd Governor of Indiana
- In office September 12, 1822 – December 5, 1822
- Lieutenant: Vacant
- Preceded by: Jonathan Jennings
- Succeeded by: William Hendricks

2nd and 3rd Lieutenant Governor of Indiana
- In office December 5, 1822 – January 30, 1824
- Governor: William Hendricks
- Preceded by: Himself
- Succeeded by: John H. Thompson
- In office December 8, 1819 – September 12, 1822
- Governor: Jonathan Jennings
- Preceded by: Christopher Harrison
- Succeeded by: Himself

Indiana Senate
- In office December 5, 1818 – December 4, 1819

Indiana House of Representatives
- In office December 5, 1816 – December 4, 1818

Personal details
- Born: January 18, 1781 Franklin County, North Carolina
- Died: November 20, 1844 (aged 63) Louisiana, Missouri
- Party: Democratic-Republican; Democrat
- Spouse: Delilah Anderson Boon
- Children: Seven
- Occupation: Farmer; Politician

Military service
- Allegiance: United States of America
- Branch/service: Indiana Militia
- Years of service: 1811–1813
- Rank: Colonel
- Battles/wars: War of 1812

Ratliff Boon (January 18, 1781 – November 20, 1844) was an American politician who briefly served as the second Governor of Indiana — taking office following the resignation of Governor Jonathan Jennings, whom he served as lieutenant governor under, after his election to Congress, and subsequently serving again as lieutenant governor under Governor William Hendricks — and a six-term member of the United States House of Representatives. A prominent politician in the state, Boon was instrumental in the formation of the state Democratic Party, and he supported President Andrew Jackson's policies while in the House.

== Early life ==
=== Background and education ===
Ratliff Boon was born January 18, 1781, in Franklin County, North Carolina, the son of Jesse and Kessiah Boon. At a young age he moved with his parents to Warren County, Kentucky, where he attended a public grade school and later apprenticed as a gunsmith in Danville, Kentucky. In 1801 he was married to Delilah Anderson, together the couple had seven children. In 1809 he moved to what is now Boon Township of Warrick County, Indiana. Boonville, the county seat, was later named in his honor. At the outbreak of the War of 1812, Boon joined the Indiana Territorial militia and eventually rose to the rank of colonel.

== Public office ==
=== Legislator ===
Warrick County was organized in 1813 and Boon was appointed by Governor Thomas Posey to the position of County Treasurer. In 1816 he was elected to the first state legislature where he served two one-year terms. During his terms, his primary accomplishment was successfully promoting legislation to divide Warrick County into three separate counties. He was elected to the state senate in December 1818 but resigned after winning the election to become the second Lieutenant Governor in December 1819.

Christopher Harrison had resigned his position as lieutenant governor after a scandal, leaving no incumbent. Two other men briefly competed against Boon for the position, but he defeated them in the general election, 7,397 votes to his closest competitors 3,882. In 1820 the legislature passed laws to lower the wolf population. Wolves had been creating havoc on the frontier. They offered a premium reward for wolf pelts, Boon capitalized on the new law and earned more than seven-hundred dollars by killing wolves. His success led to the rapid repeal of the law which quickly became a drain on the state's limited resources.

=== Governor ===
In 1822 he was re-elected as lieutenant governor on a ticket with William Hendricks. When Governor Jonathan Jennings resigned to take a seat in Congress, Boon succeeded him and became the second governor of the state on September 12, 1822, and served until Hendricks's inauguration on December 5, 1822. Boon's only act of consequence during his short time as governor was to conduct a census of the area purchased by the Treaty of St. Mary's and make recommendations for the creation of counties in the region. His proposal was adopted by the General Assembly, which organized county governments and created three seats in the assembly to provide representation to the subjects of the census. Boon returned to the lieutenant governor's office and remained in that position until January 30, 1824, when he resigned after winning the election to the United States House of Representatives.

=== Congressman ===
Boon was elected as a Jacksonian and served in Congress from March 4, 1825, to March 3, 1827. He was unsuccessful in his re-election attempt in 1826, defeated by Thomas H. Blake who ran on an internal improvement platform which Boon's party was opposed to. During the term he sat out of office, he was instrumental in establishing the Democratic Party in Indiana. Up until that time, there were no formal political parties in the state, and all politicians loosely affiliated with the Democratic-Republican Party. He ran again for the office in 1828, and won. He served in Congress again from March 4, 1829, to March 3, 1839. While in congress he was chairman of the Committee on Public Lands from 1835 until 1839. He made an unsuccessful run for re-election in 1839, and was defeated by Oliver H. Smith.

The same year of his defeat, Boon moved to Louisiana, Missouri. In Missouri he quickly rose in prominence and became a fierce opponent of Thomas H. Benton and the pro-slavery faction of the state government. In 1844 he ran for Congress again, hoping to defeat the pro-slavery candidate, but he became ill and withdrew from the race. Boon remained sick and died shortly after hearing of his party's victory in the election. He died there on November 20, 1844. He is interred in Riverview Cemetery of Louisiana, his son, Baily Hart Boon, later erected a monument over his grave.

U.S. House of Representatives
Preceded by Jacob Call	Member of the U.S. House of Representatives from Indiana's 1st congressional district 1825–1827	Succeeded by Thomas H. Blake
Preceded by Thomas H. Blake	Member of the U.S. House of Representatives from Indiana's 1st congressional district 1829–1839	Succeeded by George H. Proffit
Political offices
Preceded by Jonathan Jennings	Governor of Indiana; September 12 – December 5, 1822	Succeeded by William Hendricks
Preceded by Christopher Harrison	Lieutenant Governor of Indiana; 1819 – 1822	Succeeded by John H. Thompson
