= Index of Indiana-related articles =

The location of the state of Indiana in the United States of America

The following is an alphabetical list of articles related to the U.S. state of Indiana.

== 0–9 ==
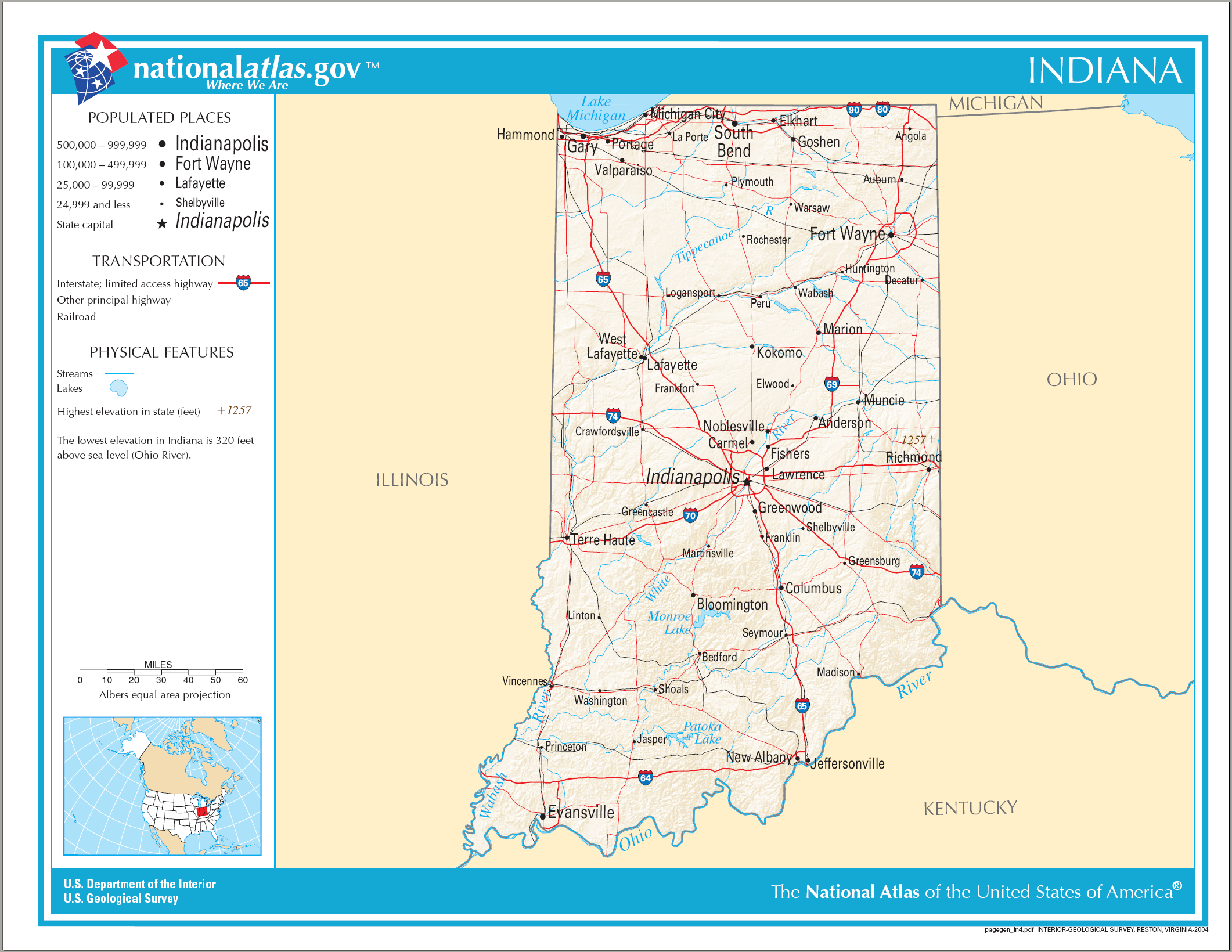
An enlargeable map of the state of Indiana

- .in.us – Internet second-level domain for the state of Indiana
- 19th state to join the United States of America

== A ==
- Adjacent states:
  - Commonwealth of Kentucky
  - State of Illinois
  - State of Michigan
  - State of Ohio
- Agriculture in Indiana
- Airports in Indiana
- Amusement parks in Indiana
- Arboreta in Indiana
  - commons:Category:Arboreta in Indiana
- Archaeology of Indiana
  - Category:Archaeological sites in Indiana
    - commons:Category:Archaeological sites in Indiana
- Architecture of Indiana
  - commons:Category:Buildings in Indiana
  - Art Deco architecture in Indiana
- Area codes in Indiana
- Art in Indiana
  - commons:Category:Art in Indiana
- Art museums and galleries in Indiana
  - commons:Category:Art museums and galleries in Indiana
- Artists from Indiana
  - commons:Category:Artists from Indiana
- Astronomical observatories in Indiana
  - commons:Category:Astronomical observatories in Indiana
- Attorney General of the State of Indiana

== B ==
- Battles fought in Indiana
- Birds of Indiana
- Botanical gardens in Indiana
  - commons:Category:Botanical gardens in Indiana
- Breweries of Indiana
  - Category:Beer brewing companies based in Indiana
- Bridges on the National Register of Historic Places in Indiana
- Buildings and structures in Indiana
  - commons:Category:Buildings and structures in Indiana

== C ==
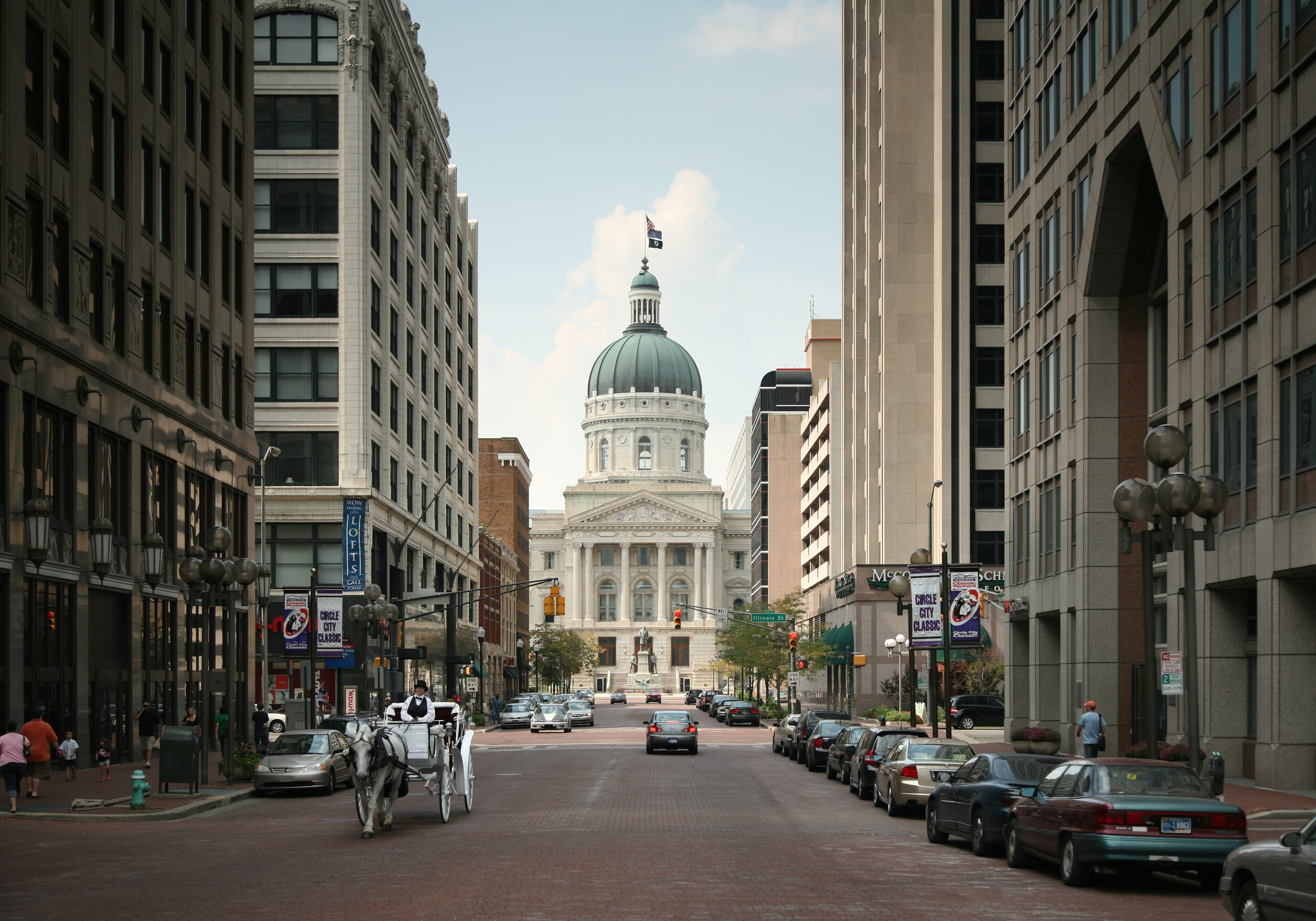
The Indiana Statehouse in Indianapolis

- Caitlin Clark effect
- Canyons and gorges of Indiana
  - commons:Category:Canyons and gorges of Indiana
- Capital of the State of Indiana
- Capital punishment in Indiana
- Capitol of the State of Indiana
  - commons:Category:Indiana State Capitol
- Casinos in Indiana
- Caves of Indiana
  - commons:Category:Caves of Indiana
- Census statistical areas of Indiana
- Chicago-Naperville-Joliet, IL-IN-WI Metropolitan Statistical Area
- Chicago-Naperville-Michigan City, IL-IN-WI Combined Statistical Area
- Cincinnati Arch
- Cities in Indiana
  - commons:Category:Cities in Indiana

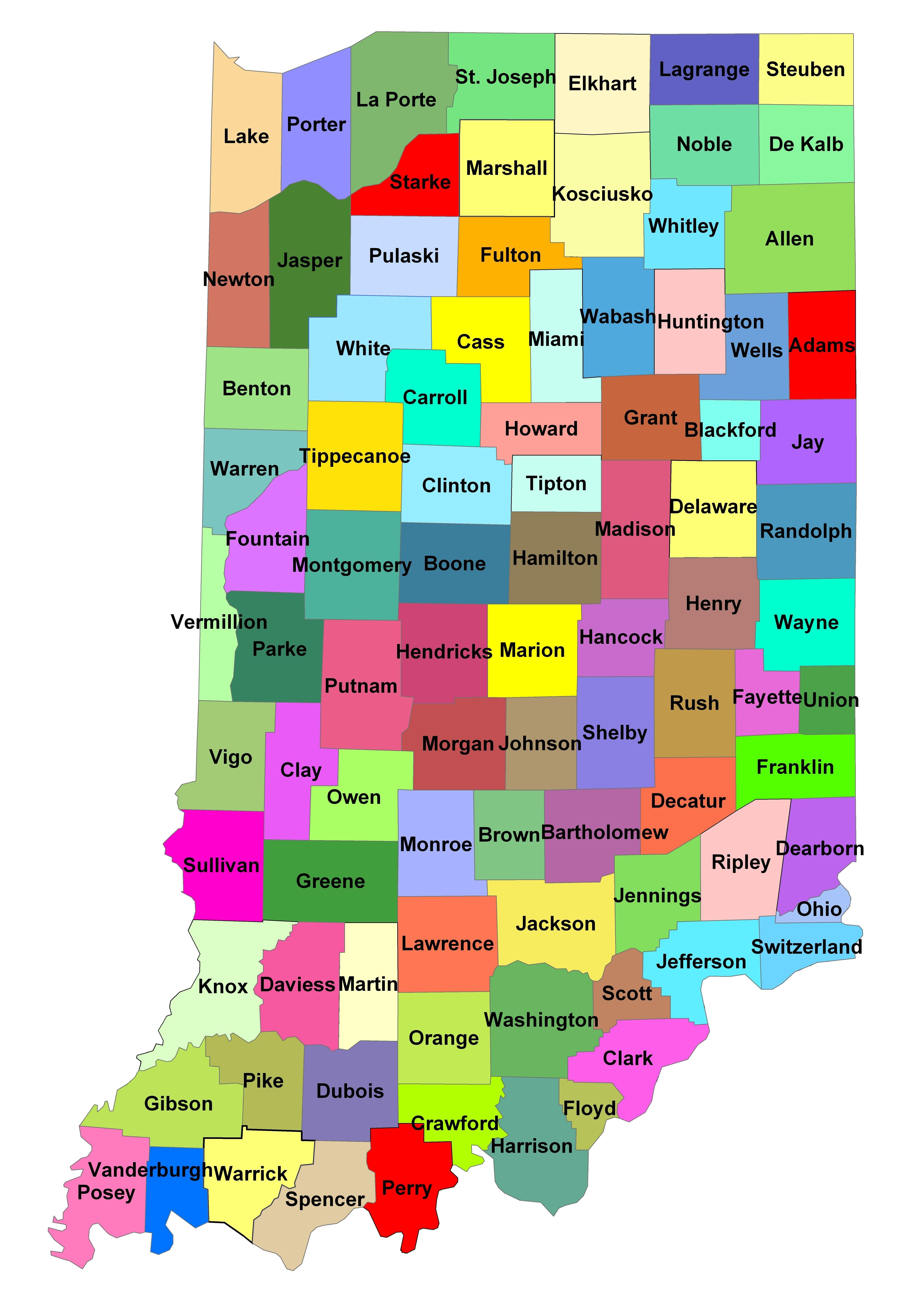
An enlargeable map of the 92 counties of the state of Indiana

- Climate of Indiana
- Climate change in Indiana
- Colleges and universities in Indiana
  - commons:Category:Universities and colleges in Indiana
- Communications in Indiana
  - commons:Category:Communications in Indiana
- Companies in Indiana
- Congressional districts of Indiana
- Constitution of the State of Indiana
- Convention centers in Indiana
  - commons:Category:Convention centers in Indiana
- Corydon, Indiana, territorial and state capital 1813–1825
- Counties of the state of Indiana
  - commons:Category:Counties in Indiana
- Courts of Indiana
- Crime in Indiana
- Crossroads of America - Indiana's motto
- Culture of Indiana
  - commons:Category:Indiana culture

== D ==
- Demographics of Indiana

== E ==
- Economy of Indiana
  - Category:Economy of Indiana
    - commons:Category:Economy of Indiana
- Education in Indiana
  - Category:Education in Indiana
    - commons:Category:Education in Indiana
  - Education segregation in Indiana
- Elections in Indiana
  - Category:Elections in Indiana
    - commons:Category:Elections in Indiana
- Electoral reform in Indiana
- Environment of Indiana
  - commons:Category:Environment of Indiana

== F ==
The flag of the state of Indiana

- Festivals in Indiana
  - commons:Category:Festivals in Indiana
- Flag of the state of Indiana
- Flyover state
- Former state highways in Indiana
- Forts in Indiana
  - Category:Forts in Indiana
    - commons:Category:Forts in Indiana

== G ==
The Great Seal of the State of Indiana

- Geography of Indiana
  - Category:Geography of Indiana
    - commons:Category:Geography of Indiana
- Geology of Indiana
  - Indiana limestone
  - commons:Category:Geology of Indiana
- Ghost towns in Indiana
  - Category:Ghost towns in Indiana
    - commons:Category:Ghost towns in Indiana
- Golf clubs and courses in Indiana
- Government of the state of Indiana website
  - Category:Government of Indiana
    - commons:Category:Government of Indiana
  - Category:Government buildings in Indiana
    - commons:Category:Government buildings in Indiana
- Governor of the State of Indiana
  - List of governors of Indiana
- Great Seal of the State of Indiana
- Gun laws in Indiana

== H ==
- Heritage railroads in Indiana
  - commons:Category:Heritage railroads in Indiana
- High schools of Indiana
- Higher education in Indiana
- Highway routes in Indiana
- Hiking trails in Indiana
  - commons:Category:Hiking trails in Indiana
- History of Indiana
  - Historical outline of Indiana
    - Category:History of Indiana
      - commons:Category:History of Indiana
- Hoosier
- Hospitals in Indiana
- House of Representatives of the State of Indiana

== I ==
- Images of Indiana
  - commons:Category:Indiana
- IN – United States Postal Service postal code for the state of Indiana
- Indian removals in Indiana
- Indiana website
  - Category:Indiana
    - commons:Category:Indiana
      - commons:Category:Maps of Indiana
- Indiana Air National Guard
- Indiana Code
- Indiana Court of Appeals
- Indiana Day
- Indiana Department of Administration
- Indiana Department of Correction
- Indiana Department of Education
- Indiana Department of Natural Resources
- Indiana Department of Transportation
- Indiana E-Learning Academy
- Indiana General Assembly
- Indiana Humanities
- Indiana Judicial Nominating Commission
- Indiana limestone - Indiana's state stone
- Indiana National Guard
- Indiana Office of Community & Rural Affairs
- Indiana Philosophical Association
- Indiana State Auditor
- Indiana State Fair
- Indiana State Museum
- Indiana State Police
- Indiana State Treasurer
- Indiana State University
  - List of Indiana State University people
- Indiana Statehouse
- Indiana Superintendent of Public Instruction
- Indiana Toll Road
- Indiana Township Trustee
- Indiana University
  - Indiana University Bloomington, flagship campus
    - Indiana Hoosiers, this campus' athletic program
    - List of Indiana University Bloomington people
  - Indiana University Indianapolis, primary urban campus
    - IU Indy Jaguars, this campus' athletic program
  - Indiana University Columbus (administered by IU Indianapolis)
  - Indiana University East
  - Indiana University Fort Wayne (administered by IU Indianapolis)
  - Indiana University Kokomo
  - Indiana University Northwest
  - Indiana University South Bend
  - Indiana University Southeast
- Indiana University Cinema
- Indiana wine
- Indianapolis, state capital since 1825
- Indianapolis 500 (officially Indianapolis 500-Mile Race)
- Interstate highway routes in Indiana
- Islands in Indiana

== K ==
- Kankakee Arch
- Kentland crater

== L ==
- Lakes of Indiana
  - Lake Michigan
  - commons:Category:Lakes of Indiana
- Landmarks in Indiana
  - commons:Category:Landmarks in Indiana
- Lieutenant Governor of the State of Indiana
- Limestone of Indiana
- Lists related to the state of Indiana:
  - List of airports in Indiana
  - List of battles fought in Indiana
  - List of birds of Indiana
  - List of breweries in Indiana
  - List of Carnegie libraries in Indiana
  - List of census-designated places in Indiana
  - List of census statistical areas in Indiana
  - List of cities in Indiana
  - List of colleges and universities in Indiana
  - List of United States congressional districts in Indiana
  - List of counties in Indiana
  - List of flora of Indiana
  - List of former state highways in Indiana
  - List of forts in Indiana
  - List of ghost towns in Indiana
  - List of governors of Indiana
  - List of high schools in Indiana
  - List of hospitals in Indiana
  - List of Indiana state symbols
  - List of individuals executed in Indiana
  - List of Interstate highway routes in Indiana
  - List of islands in Indiana
  - List of law enforcement agencies in Indiana
  - List of museums in Indiana
  - List of National Historic Landmarks in Indiana
  - List of National Natural Landmarks in Indiana
  - List of newspapers in Indiana
  - List of people from Indiana
  - List of power stations in Indiana
  - List of radio stations in Indiana
  - List of railroads in Indiana
  - List of Registered Historic Places in Indiana
  - List of rivers of Indiana
  - List of school districts in Indiana
  - List of state forests in Indiana
  - List of state lakes in Indiana
  - List of state parks in Indiana
  - List of state prisons in Indiana
  - List of state roads in Indiana
  - List of symbols of the state of Indiana
  - List of Superfund sites in Indiana
  - List of television stations in Indiana
  - List of towns in Indiana
  - List of Indiana's congressional delegations
  - List of United States congressional districts in Indiana
  - List of United States post offices in Indiana
  - List of United States representatives from Indiana
  - List of United States senators from Indiana
  - List of U.S. highway routes in Indiana
  - List of wineries in Indiana

== M ==
- Maps of Indiana
  - commons:Category:Maps of Indiana
- Mass media in Indiana
- Museums in Indiana
  - Category:Museums in Indiana
    - commons:Category:Museums in Indiana
- Music of Indiana
  - commons:Category:Music of Indiana
  - Category:Musical groups from Indiana
  - Category:Musicians from Indiana

== N ==
- National forests of Indiana
  - commons:Category:National Forests of Indiana
- National Register of Historic Places listings in Indiana. By county:

Adams | Allen | Bartholomew | Benton | Blackford | Boone | Brown | Carroll | Cass | Clark | Clay | Clinton | Crawford | Daviess | Dearborn | Decatur | DeKalb | Delaware | Dubois | Elkhart | Fayette | Floyd | Fountain | Franklin | Fulton | Gibson | Grant | Greene | Hamilton | Hancock | Harrison | Hendricks | Henry | Howard | Huntington | Jackson | Jasper | Jay | Jefferson | Jennings | Johnson | Knox | Kosciusko | LaGrange | Lake | LaPorte | Lawrence | Madison | Marion | Marshall | Martin | Martin | Monroe | Montgomery | Morgan | Newton | Noble | Ohio | Orange | Owen | Parke | Perry | Pike | Porter | Posey | Pulaski | Putnam | Randolph | Ripley | Rush | St. Joseph | Scott | Shelby | Spencer | Starke | Steuben | Sullivan | Switzerland | Tippecanoe | Tipton | Union | Vanderburgh | Vermillion | Vigo | Wabash | Warren | Warrick | Washington | Wayne | Wells | White | Whitley

  - Railroad property on the National Register of Historic Places in Indiana
- Natural arches of Indiana
  - commons:Category:Natural arches of Indiana
- Natural history of Indiana
  - commons:Category:Natural history of Indiana
- Nature centers in Indiana
  - commons:Category:Nature centers in Indiana
- Newspapers of Indiana
- Northern Indiana
- Northwest Territory, (1787–1800)-1803

== O ==
- Ohio River
- Outdoor sculptures in Indiana
  - commons:Category:Outdoor sculptures in Indiana

== P ==
- People from Indiana
  - Category:People from Indiana
    - commons:Category:People from Indiana
    - Category:Ethnic groups in Indiana
    - Category:People from Indiana by populated place
    - Category:People from Indiana by county
    - Category:People from Indiana by occupation
- Politics of Indiana
  - commons:Category:Politics of Indiana
  - Political party strength in Indiana
- Post office buildings in Indiana
  - commons: Category: Post offices in Indiana
- Protected areas of Indiana
  - commons:Category:Protected areas of Indiana
- Purdue University system
  - Purdue University, main campus in West Lafayette
    - Purdue Boilermakers, athletic program
  - Purdue University Fort Wayne
    - Purdue Fort Wayne Mastodons, athletic program
  - Purdue University in Indianapolis (extension of the West Lafayette campus)
  - Purdue University Northwest
    - Purdue Northwest Pride, athletic program

== R ==
- Radio stations in Indiana
- Railroad museums in Indiana
  - commons:Category:Railroad museums in Indiana
- Railroads in Indiana
- Recognition of same-sex unions in Indiana
- Registered historic places in Indiana
  - commons:Category:Registered Historic Places in Indiana
- Religion in Indiana
  - Category:Religion in Indiana
    - commons:Category:Religion in Indiana
- Rivers of Indiana
  - commons:Category:Rivers of Indiana
- Rock formations in Indiana
  - commons:Category:Rock formations in Indiana
- Roller coasters in Indiana
  - commons:Category:Roller coasters in Indiana

== S ==
- School districts of Indiana
- Scouting in Indiana
- Secretary of State of Indiana
- Senate of the State of Indiana
- Settlements in Indiana
  - Cities in Indiana
  - Towns in Indiana
  - Townships in Indiana
  - Census Designated Places in Indiana
    - Category:Populated places in Indiana
  - Other unincorporated communities in Indiana
  - List of ghost towns in Indiana
  - Ships named honor of Indiana
- Southern Indiana
- Southwestern Indiana
- Sports in Indiana
  - Indiana Sports Hall of Fame
  - Category:Sports in Indiana
    - commons:Category:Sports in Indiana
  - Category:Sports venues in Indiana
    - commons:Category:Sports venues in Indiana
- State of Indiana website
  - Constitution of the State of Indiana
  - Government of the State of Indiana
    - Category:Government of Indiana
      - commons:Category:Government of Indiana
  - Executive branch of the government of the State of Indiana
    - Governor of the State of Indiana
  - Legislative branch of the government of the State of Indiana
    - General Assembly of the State of Indiana
      - Senate of the State of Indiana
      - House of Representatives of the State of Indiana
        - Speaker of the Indiana House of Representatives
  - Judicial branch of the government of the State of Indiana
    - Supreme Court of the State of Indiana
- State parks of Indiana
  - commons:Category:State parks of Indiana
- State roads in Indiana
- State Police of Indiana
- State prisons of Indiana
- Structures in Indiana
  - commons:Category:Buildings and structures in Indiana
- Superfund sites in Indiana
- Supreme Court of the State of Indiana
- Symbols of the State of Indiana
  - Category:Symbols of Indiana
    - commons:Category:Symbols of Indiana

== T ==
- Telecommunications in Indiana
  - commons:Category:Communications in Indiana
- Telephone area codes in Indiana
- Television shows set in Indiana
- Television stations in Indiana
- Territory Northwest of the River Ohio, (1787–1800)-1803
- Territory of Indiana, 1800–1816
- Theatres in Indiana
  - commons:Category:Theatres in Indiana
- Tourism in Indiana website
  - commons:Category:Tourism in Indiana
- Towns in Indiana
  - List of sundown towns in the United States#Indiana
  - commons:Category:Cities in Indiana
- Transportation in Indiana
  - Category:Transportation in Indiana
    - commons:Category:Transport in Indiana

== U ==
- Underground Railroad in Indiana
- United States of America
  - States of the United States of America
  - United States census statistical areas of Indiana
  - Indiana's congressional delegations
  - United States congressional districts in Indiana
  - United States Court of Appeals for the Seventh Circuit
  - United States District Court for the Northern District of Indiana
  - United States District Court for the Southern District of Indiana
  - United States representatives from Indiana
  - United States senators from Indiana
- Universities and colleges in Indiana
  - commons:Category:Universities and colleges in Indiana
- U.S. highway routes in Indiana
- US-IN – ISO 3166-2:US region code for the State of Indiana

== V ==
- Vincennes, Indiana, first territorial capital 1800–1813

== W ==
- Water parks in Indiana
- Waterfalls of Indiana
  - commons:Category:Waterfalls of Indiana
- White River Park State Games
  Wikimedia
  - Wikimedia Commons:Category:Indiana
    - commons:Category:Maps of Indiana
  - Wikinews:Category:Indiana
    - Wikinews:Portal:Indiana
  - Wikipedia Category:Indiana
    - Wikipedia Portal:Indiana
    - Wikipedia:WikiProject Indiana
      - Category:WikiProject Indiana articles
      - Category:WikiProject Indiana participants
- Wind power in Indiana
- Wine in Indiana
- Wineries in Indiana
- Writers from Indiana by populated place
  - commons:Category:Writers from Indiana

== Z ==
- Zoos in Indiana
  - commons:Category:Zoos in Indiana

== See also ==
- Topic overview:
  - Indiana
  - Outline of Indiana
