= Outline of Indiana =

U.S. State

The flag of Indiana

The seal of Indiana

The location of the state of Indiana in the United States of America

The following outline is provided as an overview of and topical guide to the U.S. state of Indiana:

Indiana – a U.S. state, was admitted to the United States as the 19th state on December 11, 1816. It is located in the midwestern United States and Great Lakes Region of North America. With 6,483,802 residents, as of the 2010 U.S. Census, the state is ranked 15th in population and 16th in population density. Indiana is ranked 38th in land area and is the smallest state in the contiguous U.S. west of the Appalachian Mountains. Indiana's capital and largest city is Indianapolis, the second largest of any state capital and largest state capital east of the Mississippi River.

== General reference ==
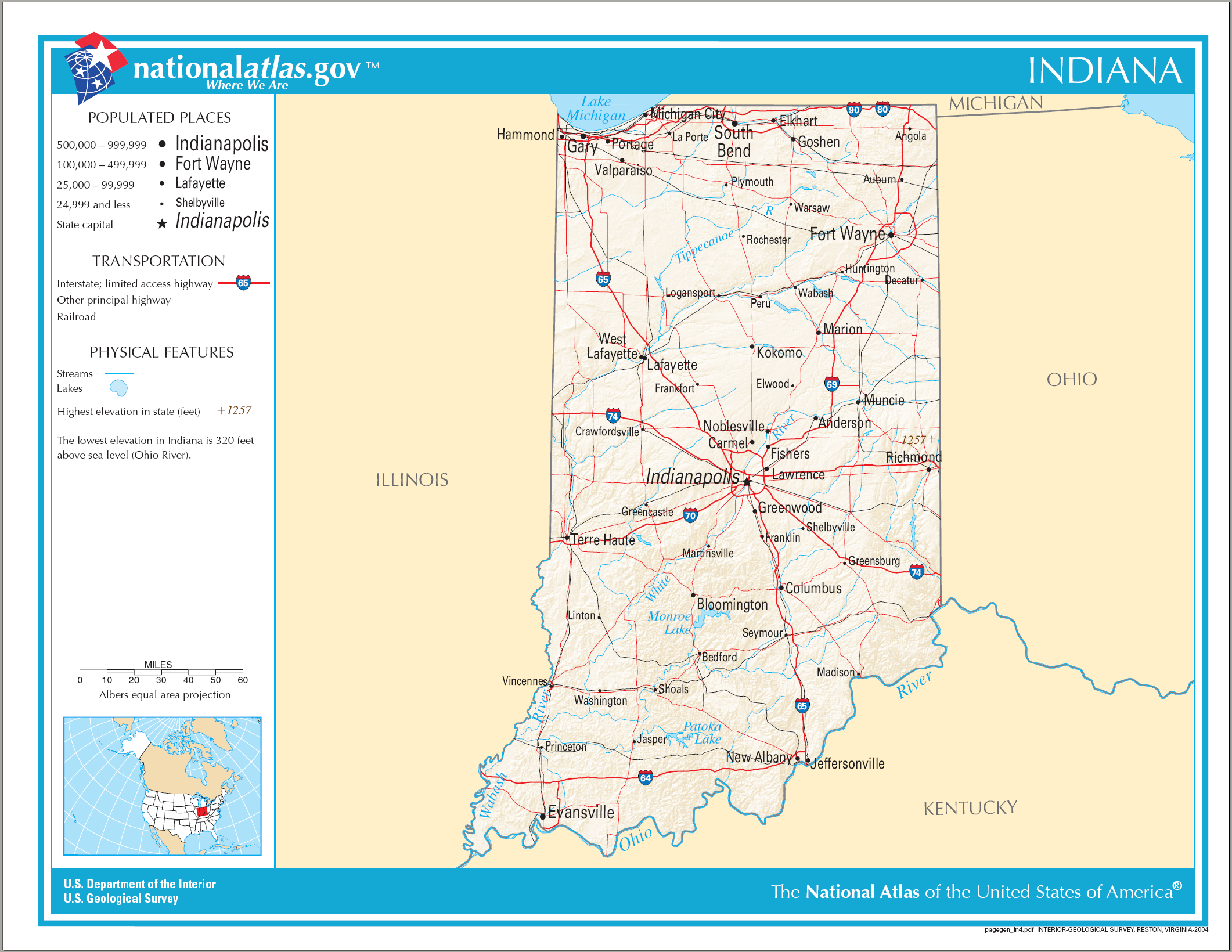
An enlargeable map of the state of Indiana

- Names
  - Common name: Indiana
    - Pronunciation: /ɪndiˈænə/
  - Official name: State of Indiana
  - Abbreviations and name codes
    - Postal symbol: IN
    - ISO 3166-2 code: US-IN
    - Internet second-level domain: .in.us
  - Nicknames
    - Crossroads of America (previously used on license plates)
    - Hoosier State
    - Hospitality State
- Adjectivals
  - Indiana
  - Hoosier
- Demonyms
  - Hoosier
  - Indianian (usage disparaged)
  - Indianan (usage disparaged)

== Geography of Indiana ==
Geography of Indiana

- Indiana is: a U.S. state, a federal state of the United States of America
- Location
  - Northern Hemisphere
  - Western Hemisphere
    - Americas
      - North America
        - Anglo America
        - Northern America
          - United States of America
            - Contiguous United States
              - Central United States
                - Corn Belt
                - Rust Belt
                - East North Central States
              - Midwestern United States
          - Great Lakes Region
- Population of Indiana: 6,483,802 (2010 U.S. Census)
- Area of Indiana (land and water): 36,418 square miles (94,320 km^{2})
- Atlas of Indiana

=== Places in Indiana ===
- Historic places in Indiana
  - National Historic Landmarks in Indiana
  - National Register of Historic Places listings in Indiana
    - Bridges on the National Register of Historic Places in Indiana
- National Natural Landmarks in Indiana
- Hoosier National Forest
- National parks in Indiana
- State parks in Indiana

=== Environment of Indiana ===
- Climate of Indiana
  - Climate change in Indiana
- Protected areas in Indiana
  - Hoosier National Forest
  - State forests of Indiana
- Superfund sites in Indiana
- Wildlife of Indiana
  - Fauna of Indiana
    - Birds of Indiana
  - Flora of Indiana
- Ecoregions of Indiana

==== Natural geographic features of Indiana ====
- Lakes of Indiana
- Rivers of Indiana
  - Ohio River
  - Wabash River
  - Kankakee River

==== Human-made geographical features of Indiana ====
- List of dams and reservoirs in Indiana

=== Regions of Indiana ===
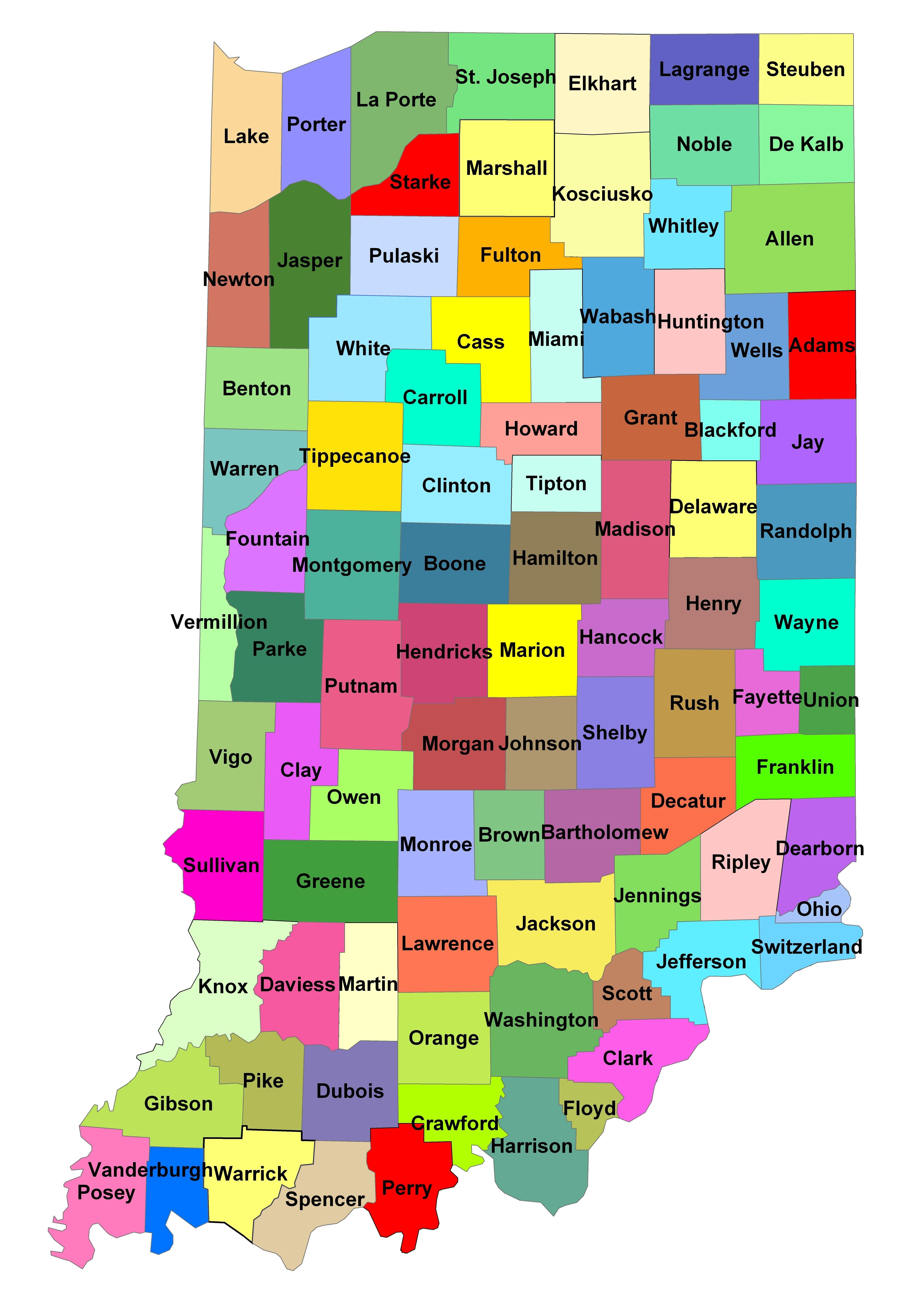
An enlargeable map of the 92 counties of the state of Indiana

- Central Indiana
- Northern Indiana
  - Northeastern Indiana
  - Northwest Indiana
- Southern Indiana
  - Southwestern Indiana

==== Administrative divisions of Indiana ====
- The 92 counties of the state of Indiana
  - Municipalities in Indiana
    - Cities in Indiana
      - State capital of Indiana: Indianapolis
      - City nicknames in Indiana
    - Towns in Indiana
  - Townships in Indiana
  - Census-designated places in Indiana

=== Demography of Indiana ===
Demographics of Indiana

== Government and politics of Indiana ==
Politics of Indiana

- Form of government: U.S. state government
- Indiana State Capitol

=== Federal government in Indiana ===
- Indiana's congressional delegations
  - List of United States senators from Indiana
  - List of United States representatives from Indiana
    - Indiana's congressional districts
- United States courts in Indiana
  - United States Court of Appeals for the Seventh Circuit
  - United States District Court for the Northern District of Indiana
  - United States District Court for the Southern District of Indiana

=== Elections and political parties in Indiana ===
- Elections in Indiana
  - Electoral reform in Indiana
- Political party strength in Indiana

=== Branches of the government of Indiana ===
Government of Indiana

==== Executive branch of the government of Indiana ====
- Governor of Indiana
  - Previous governors
  - Lieutenant Governor of Indiana
  - Secretary of State of Indiana
  - Indiana State Treasurer
  - Indiana Attorney General
  - Indiana State Auditor
  - Indiana Superintendent of Public Instruction
- State departments
  - Indiana Department of Administration
  - Indiana Department of Corrections
  - Indiana Department of Education
  - Indiana State Department of Health
  - Indiana Department of Natural Resources
  - Indiana State Police
  - Indiana Department of Transportation

==== Legislative branch of the government of Indiana ====
- Indiana General Assembly (bicameral)
  - Upper house: Indiana Senate
  - Lower house: Indiana House of Representatives
    - Speaker of the Indiana House of Representatives

==== Judicial branch of the government of Indiana ====
Courts of Indiana

- Indiana Judicial Nominating Commission
- Supreme Court of Indiana
  - Indiana Court of Appeals
    - Indiana Circuit Courts

=== Law and order in Indiana ===
Law of Indiana

- Indiana Code
- Cannabis in Indiana
- Capital punishment in Indiana
  - Individuals executed in Indiana
- Constitution of Indiana
- Crime in Indiana
- Gun laws in Indiana
- Indiana Day
- Law enforcement in Indiana
  - Law enforcement agencies in Indiana
    - Indiana State Police
- Same-sex marriage in Indiana

=== Military in Indiana ===
- Indiana National Guard
  - Indiana Adjutant General
  - Indiana Air National Guard
  - Indiana Army National Guard

=== Local government in Indiana ===
- County government
- City government
- Town government
  - Indiana Township Trustee

== History of Indiana ==
History of Indiana

=== By period ===
The location of the state of Indiana in the United States of America

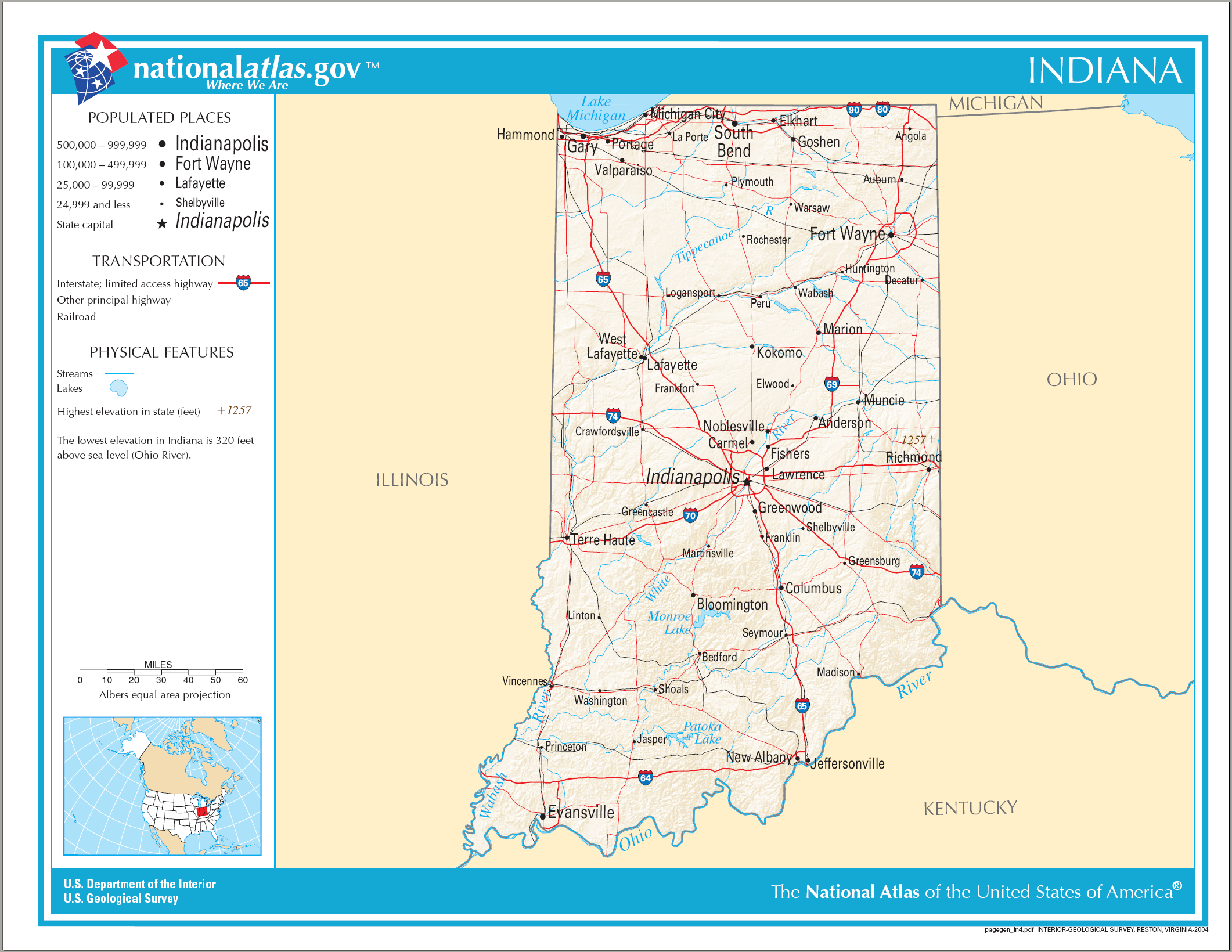
An enlargeable map of the state of Indiana

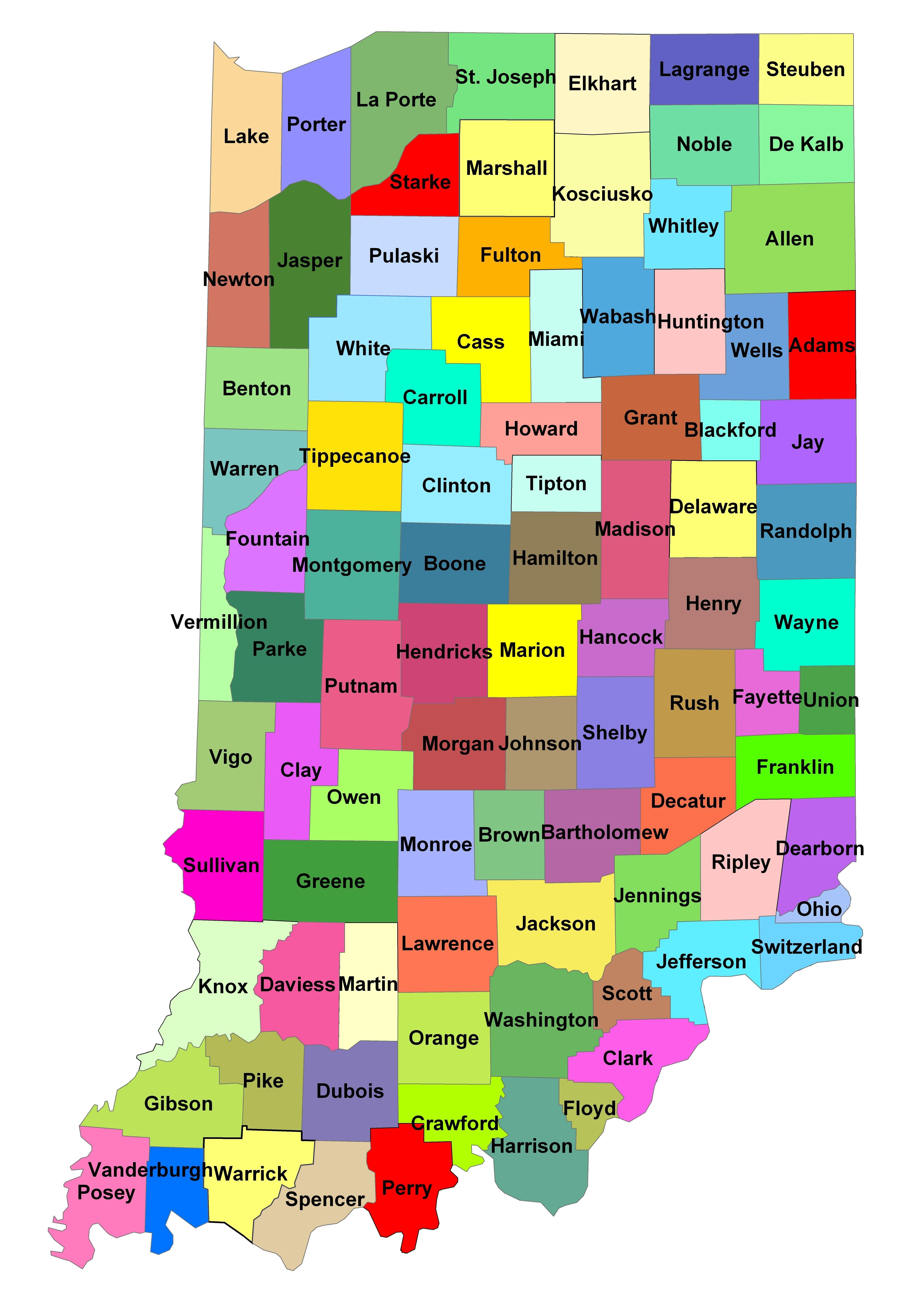
An enlargeable map of the 92 counties of the state of Indiana

- Indigenous peoples
  - Evidence of human activity date as early 8000 BC
  - Hopewell culture developed agriculture and begins Indiana's first permanent settlements. 200 BC – 400 AD
  - Mississippian culture supersedes the Hopewells, who disappeared for unknown reasons, 900
    - Mississippians build Angel Mounds, 1000
  - Beaver Wars begin between the Iroquois Confederacy and the Algonquian Confederacy depopulates much of Indiana. c. 1580 – 1701
    - French fur traders enter Indiana and establish Tassinong, the first European outpost in Indiana, 1673
  - Sieur de La Salle explores much of Indiana for the first time, claiming it for Louis XIV of France, 1679
    - Algonquian tribes (including Miami, Wea, Shawnee, Pottawatomie) return to Indiana. 1680–1700
  - Indiana is part of the French colony of Louisiane, 1699–1763
  - Vincennes is founded along the Buffalo Trace, 1732
- French and Indian War breaks out, British capture the French outposts in Indiana, 1760–1761
  - Pontiac's Rebellion spreads to Indiana, 1763.
    - The Treaty of Paris of 1763 grants Indiana to the United Kingdom
  - Indiana becomes part of the British (Francophone) Province of Quebec, 1763–1783
    - Indiana is part of protected native lands, and closed to settlement. 1769–1773
- American Revolutionary War, April 19, 1775 – September 3, 1783
  - United States Declaration of Independence, July 4, 1776
  - George Rogers Clark invades Indiana capturing key British holdings in the Illinois Campaign. 1778–1783
  - Treaty of Paris, September 3, 1783
  - Unorganized territory of the United States, 1783–1787
  - Virginia gives Indiana to the United States Government, 1784
  - Northwest Indian War, 1785–1795
    - Harmar campaign, 1790
- Northwest Territory, (1787–1800)–1803
  - Treaty of Greenville signed, opening part of Indiana for settlement for the first time by Americans, 1795
- Indiana Territory, 1800–1816
  - Treaty of Fort Wayne is signed, opening up much of southern Indiana to settlement, 1809
  - Administration of the District of Louisiana, 1804–1805
  - Slavery in Indiana becomes a major issue, 1805
  - Tecumseh's War, August 12, 1810 – October 5, 1813
    - Battle of Tippecanoe, November 7, 1811
  - War of 1812, June 18, 1812 – February 17, 1815
    - Siege of Fort Harrison, September 4–15, 1812
    - Siege of Fort Wayne, September 5–12, 1812
    - Battle of Wild Cat Creek, November 22, 1812
    - Battle of the Mississinewa, December 17–18, 1812
    - Treaty of Ghent, December 24, 1814
- State of Indiana becomes 19th state admitted to the United States of America on December 11, 1816
  - Treaty of St. Mary's is signed, opening most of central Indiana for settlement, 1819
  - Bank of Indiana created, 1832
  - Indiana verges on bankruptcy, almost all of the state's public works are liquidated by the creditors, 1841
    - Most of the native tribes are removed from Indiana, 1838–1846
  - Treaty of the Wabash signed, opening most of northern Indiana to settlement, 1840
  - William Henry Harrison becomes ninth President of the United States on March 4, 1841
  - Mexican–American War, April 25, 1846 – February 2, 1848
    - Indiana's population exceeds 1 million, 1850
    - Indiana adopted a new constitution, 1851
  - Abraham Lincoln becomes 16th President of the United States on March 4, 1861
  - American Civil War, April 12, 1861 – May 13, 1865
    - Indiana in the American Civil War
      - Morgan's Raid, June 11 – July 26, 1863
        - Battle of Corydon, July 9, 1863
    - Natural gas is discovered near Eaton, Indiana, 1876
  - Indiana Gas Boom begins, 1884
    - Natural gas supplies run low, ended the boom, 1905
  - Benjamin Harrison becomes 23rd President of the United States on March 4, 1889
  - Vietnam War, September 26, 1959 – April 30, 1975
    - Indiana adopts a series of constitutional amendments that alter the makeup of the government, 1970–1971

=== By region ===
- By city
  - History of Fort Wayne, Indiana
    - Forts of Fort Wayne, Indiana
  - History of Hartford City, Indiana
  - History of Indianapolis

=== By subject ===
- List of Indiana state legislatures
- History of slavery in Indiana
- History of sports in Indiana
  - History of sports in Fort Wayne, Indiana

=== More ===
- Category:History of Indiana
  - commons:Category:History of Indiana

== Culture of Indiana ==
Culture of Indiana

- Cuisine of Indiana
- Museums in Indiana
- Religion in Indiana
  - Episcopal Diocese of Indianapolis
- Scouting in Indiana
- State symbols of Indiana
  - Flag of the state of Indiana
  - Great Seal of the State of Indiana

=== The arts in Indiana ===
- Music of Indiana

=== Sports in Indiana ===
Sports in Indiana

== Economy and infrastructure of Indiana ==
Economy of Indiana

- Communications in Indiana
  - Newspapers in Indiana
  - Radio stations in Indiana
  - Television stations in Indiana
  - Telephone area codes in Indiana
- Energy in Indiana
  - List of power stations in Indiana
  - Wind power in Indiana
- Health care in Indiana
  - Hospitals in Indiana
- Transportation in Indiana
  - Airports in Indiana
  - Railroads in Indiana
  - Roads in Indiana
    - Interstate Highways in Indiana
      - List of U.S. Routes in Indiana
    - Indiana Toll Road
    - State roads in Indiana
      - Former state highways in Indiana
    - List of numbered roads in Indiana

== Education in Indiana ==
Education in Indiana

- Schools in Indiana
  - School districts in Indiana
    - High schools in Indiana
  - Colleges and universities in Indiana
    - Indiana University
    - Indiana State University
    - Purdue University

== See also ==
- Topic overview:
  - Indiana
  - Index of Indiana-related articles
