= Indiana University (disambiguation) =

Indiana University is a system of public universities in the U.S. state of Indiana.

Indiana University may refer to:

== Education in the US ==
=== Indiana ===
- Currently existing institutions:
  - Indiana University Bloomington, the flagship campus of Indiana University
  - Indiana University Indianapolis, the system's primary urban research and health sciences campus
  - Indiana University Columbus (administered by IU Indianapolis)
  - Indiana University East
  - Indiana University Fort Wayne (administered by IU Indianapolis)
  - Indiana University Kokomo
  - Indiana University Northwest
  - Indiana University South Bend
  - Indiana University Southeast
- Defunct institutions:
  - Indiana University–Purdue University Columbus
  - Indiana University–Purdue University Indianapolis
  - Indiana University–Purdue University Fort Wayne

=== Pennsylvania ===
- Indiana University of Pennsylvania, Indiana, Pennsylvania

== See also ==
- Indiana Hoosiers, the athletic program of Indiana University Bloomington
- Indiana State University, Terre Haute, Indiana, US
- Indiana University Health, a healthcare system located in the U.S. state of Indiana
- List of colleges and universities in Indiana
