= Indiana Academy (disambiguation) =

Indiana Academy may refer:

- Indiana Academy, a private Seventh-Day Adventist high school in Cicero, Indiana.
- Indiana Academy for Science, Mathematics, and Humanities, a public charter school located on the Ball State University campus.
- Indiana E-Learning Academy is a joint program of the Intelenet Commission and the Indiana Department of Education.
