= Southern Association of Colleges and Schools =

American niversity accreditation organization

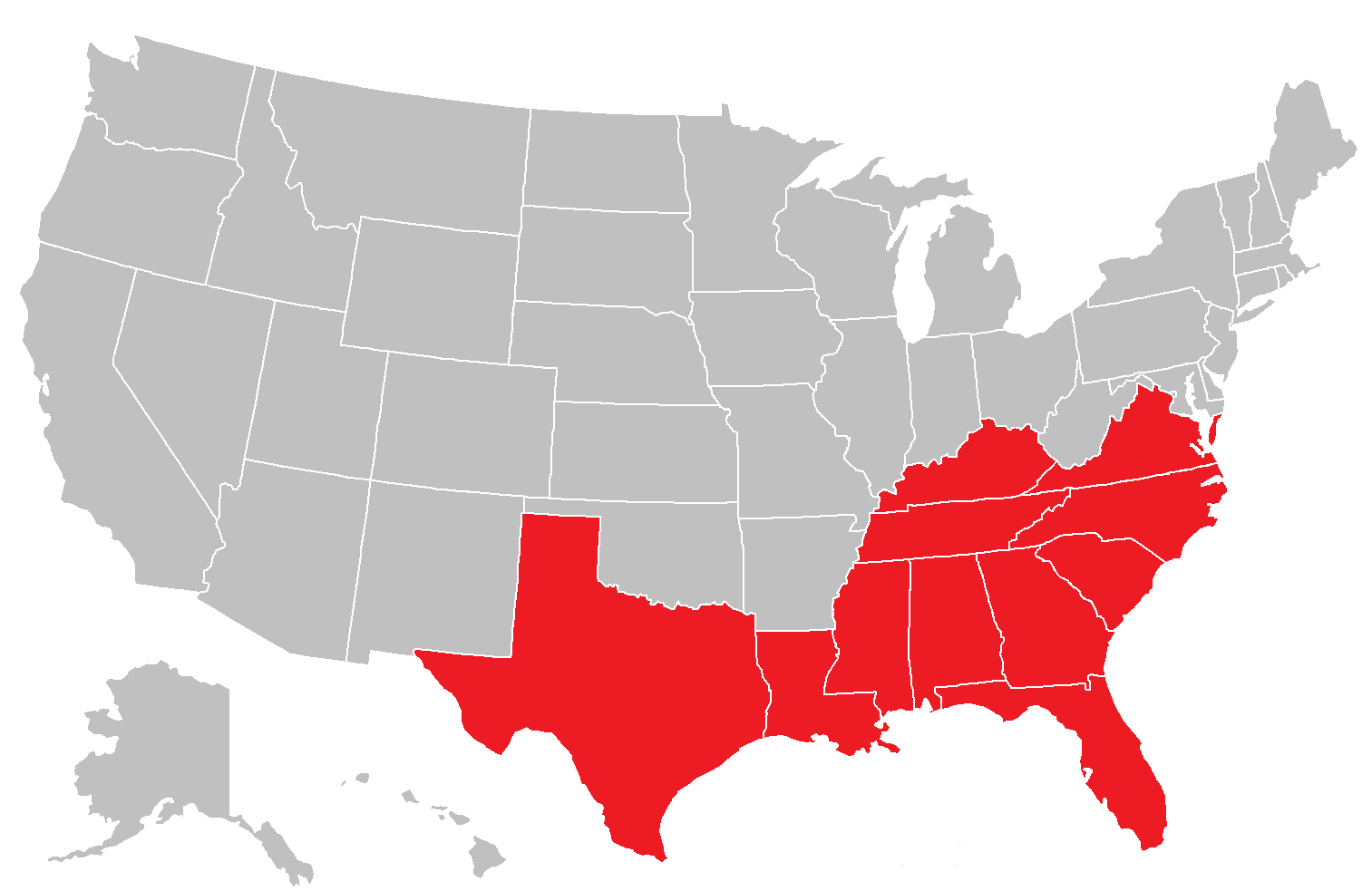
- SACS operational area
- Abbreviation: SACS
- Formation: 1895
- Type: Non-governmental organization
- Purpose: Educational accreditation
- Headquarters: North Druid Hills, Georgia, U.S.
- Region served: Alabama, Florida, Georgia, Kentucky, Louisiana, Mississippi, North Carolina, South Carolina, Tennessee, Texas, Virginia
- Chairman: John Pickelman
- President: Belle S. Wheelan
- Main organ: Board of Trustees
- Affiliations: Council for Higher Education Accreditation
- Website: sacs.org

The Southern Association of Colleges and Schools (SACS) is a regional educational accreditor recognized by the United States Department of Education and the Council for Higher Education Accreditation. As of 2022, the organization oversees approximately 750 public and private degree-granting educational institutions in the Southern United States. It is headquartered in North Druid Hills, Georgia, Atlanta metropolitan area.

SACS accredits educational institutions in the states of Alabama, Florida, Georgia, Kentucky, Louisiana, Mississippi, North Carolina, South Carolina, Tennessee, Texas, and Virginia, and educational institutions for U.S. students in Mexico, the Caribbean, Central and South America.

There are a number of affiliate organizations within the Southern Association of Colleges and Schools. One affiliate organization is the Southern Association of Community, Junior, and Technical Colleges.

== Commission on Colleges ==
The first SACS was founded in 1895 and is made up of Council on Accreditation and School Improvement and the Commission on Colleges, which existed since 1912. It also works with the Council for Higher Education Accreditation and the Association of Specialized and Professional Accreditors.

The SACS Commission on Colleges (SACSCOC) accredits universities and colleges in Alabama, Florida, Georgia, Kentucky, Louisiana, Mississippi, North Carolina, South Carolina, Tennessee, Texas, Virginia, and Latin America (Extraterritorial).

Every six months, the Southern Association of Colleges and Schools Commission on Colleges publishes an online report on its accreditation actions, including reaffirmations of accreditation and public sanctions of institutions of higher learning. The reports include specific public sanctions of schools and statements disclosing why those institutions have been placed on sanction.

The Commission on Colleges accredits both public and private institutions of higher education in the United States, including some community colleges as well as four-year institutions. As a regional accreditor, SACSCOC accreditation extends to all of the educational programs offered at the accredited institution.

Institutions in Latin America accredited by SACSCOC include the Mexican universities of Fundación Universidad de las Américas, Puebla; Universidad de las Americas, A.C.; Universidad de Monterrey; Tecnológico de Monterrey; Instituto Centroamericano de Administración de Empresas (INCAE or the Central American Institute of Business Administration) in Costa Rica and Nicaragua; and Keiser University Latin American Campus in Nicaragua. The SACSCOC has also accredited the American University in Dubai and the American University of Ras Al Khaimah.

SACS will change its name to The Commission on Colleges and Universities in September 2026.

== Council on Accreditation and School Improvement ==
SACS CASI accredits over 13,000 primary, middle, and secondary schools, and school systems located in the SACS region. In 2006, AdvancED was established with the unification of SACS CASI, NCA CASI, and NSSE. Today, SACS CASI acts as an accreditation division of AdvancED, now known as Cognia.

On December 9, 2018, the Southern Association of Colleges and Schools had excluded Bennett College from its membership due to failure of completion of the chapter 13, section 1 of the Principles of Accreditation. During the same year, they have suspended membership of the Loyola University New Orleans for the same reason and set up special committees to Johnson University and Prairie View A&M University for the full year. Due to this process, Memphis Theological Seminary was denied reaffirmation and was put on warning for a year, citing the lack of financial responsibilities and institutional planning.

The SACS had also put full year and half year warnings on the Denmark Technical and Roanoke–Chowan Community Colleges, citing lack of governing board characteristics, as well as financial federal and state responsibilities and conflict of interest, among others. The SACS also had denied faculty change to Ferrum College and a change from private to public to the Florida National University.

In 2018, a merger between College of Biblical Studies and Crossroads Bible College had been proposed and accepted with the common name of the institution will be College of Biblical Studies-Houston per Substantive Change Committee. During the same year, a merge between Keiser and Walford Universities was also called in. As of 2019, the institution is called Keiser University as was agreed upon by the Substantive Change Committee.

== See also ==
- List of recognized accreditation associations of higher learning
