= List of ships named after Indiana =

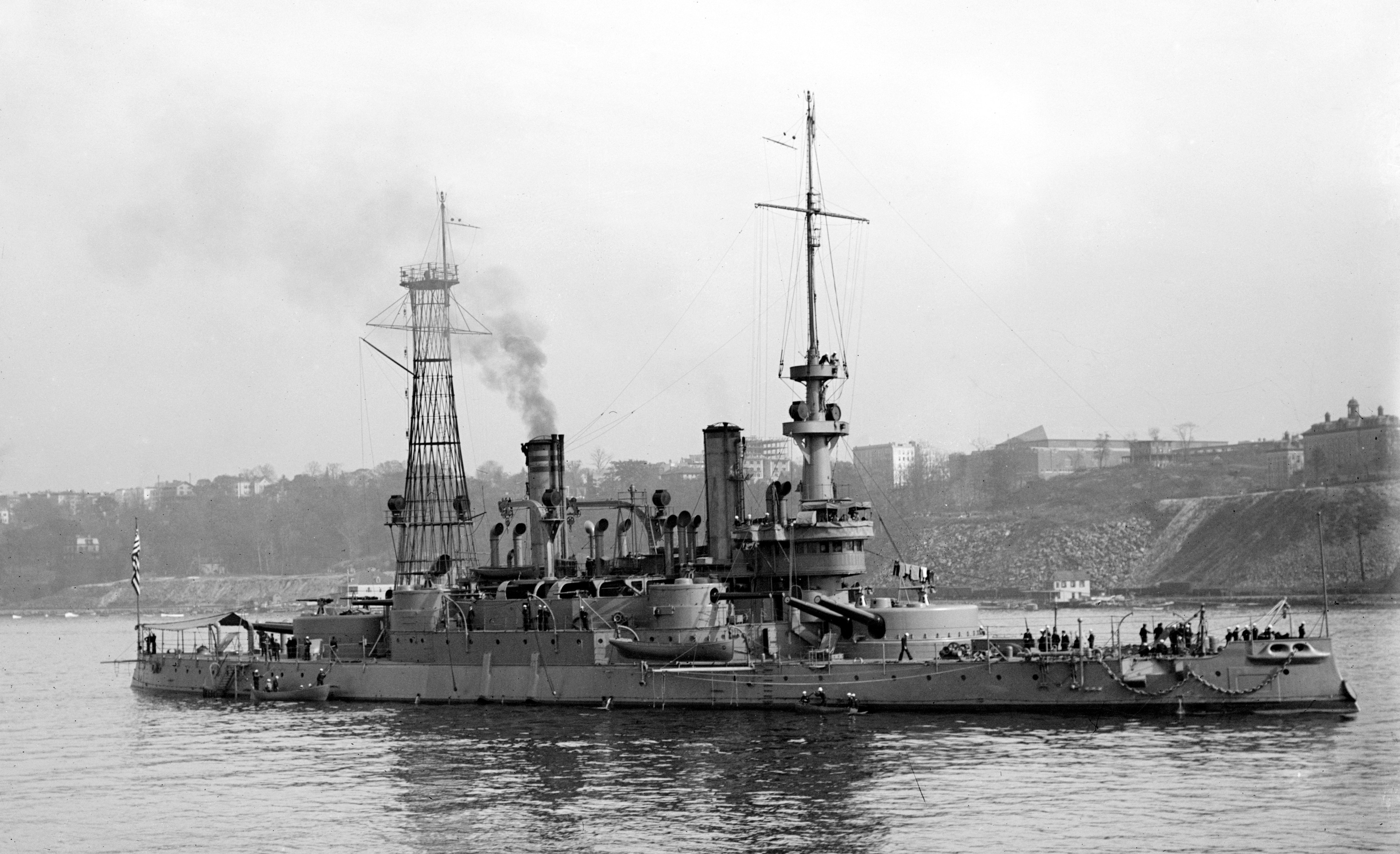
USS Indiana (BB-1) about 1910

This is a list of ships that are named after the US State of Indiana.

== Namesakes ==
Four ships of the United States Navy have been named USS Indiana in honor of the 19th state.

- USS Indiana (BB-1), was a battleship commissioned in 1895 that saw action in the Spanish–American War
- USS Indiana (BB-50), was a battleship under construction but canceled by the Washington Naval Treaty in 1924
- USS Indiana (BB-58), was a battleship commissioned in 1942 that saw action during World War II
- USS Indiana (SSN-789), is a Virginia-class submarine launched on 9 June 2017

Three ships have borne the name SS Indiana. They are:

- SS Indiana (1848) - a steamship built in 1848 by F.M. Keating.
- SS Indiana (1873) - a passenger steamship launched in 1873 by William Cramp & Sons for the American Line.
- SS Indiana (1905) - a passenger ship launched by Societa Esercizio Bacini in 1905 for Lloyd Italiano.
