= Climate change in Indiana =

Climate change in the US state of Indiana

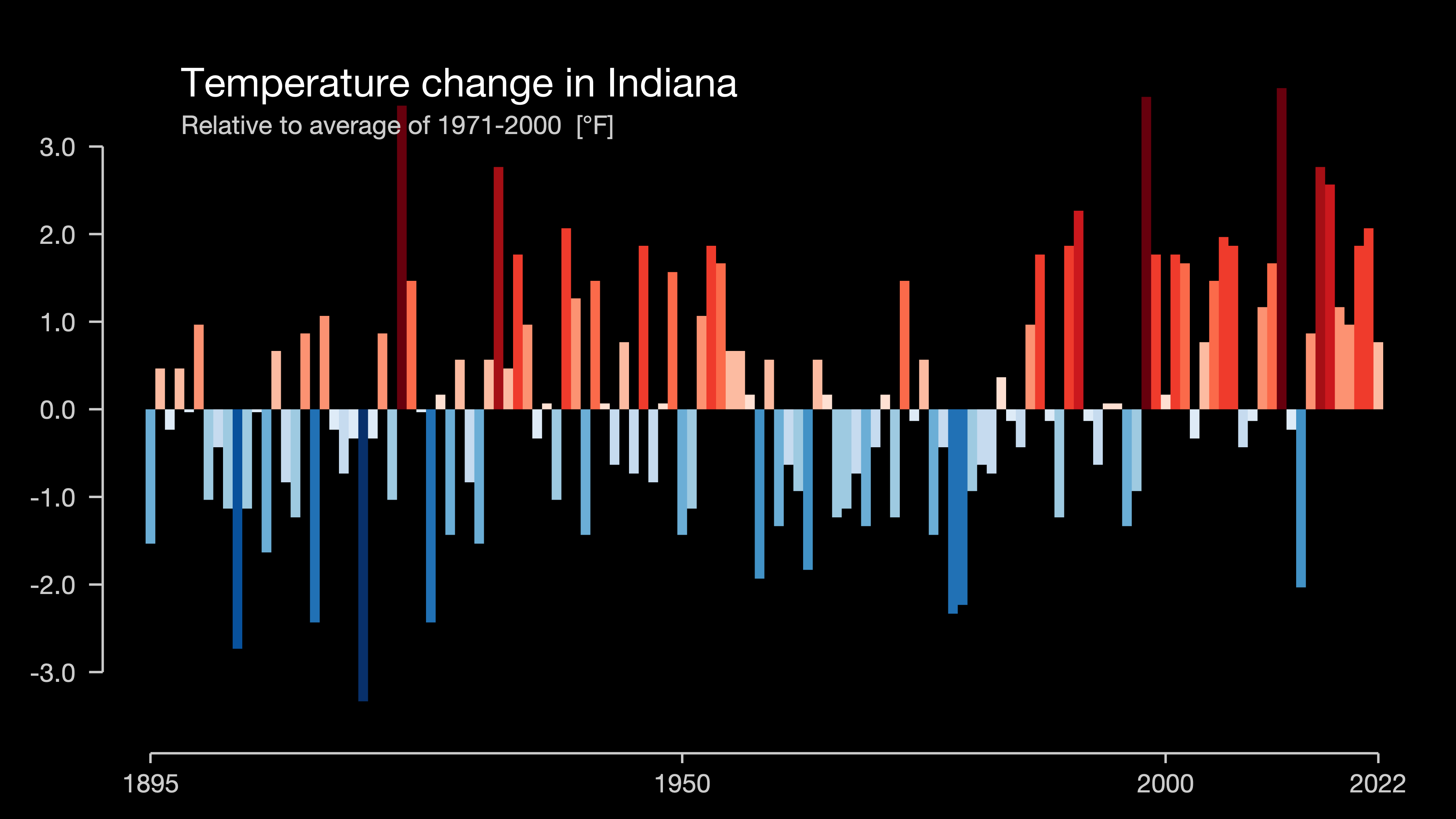
Visualization of average annual temperature anomaly in Indiana, 1895 to 2022.

Climate change in Indiana encompasses the effects of climate change, attributed to man-made increases in atmospheric carbon dioxide, in the U.S. state of Indiana. The annual mean temperature in Indiana has increased 1.2 °F (0.67 °C) since 1895. According to the United States Environmental Protection Agency (EPA) "Northern Indiana has warmed more than Southern Indiana".

== Effects of climate change in Indiana ==
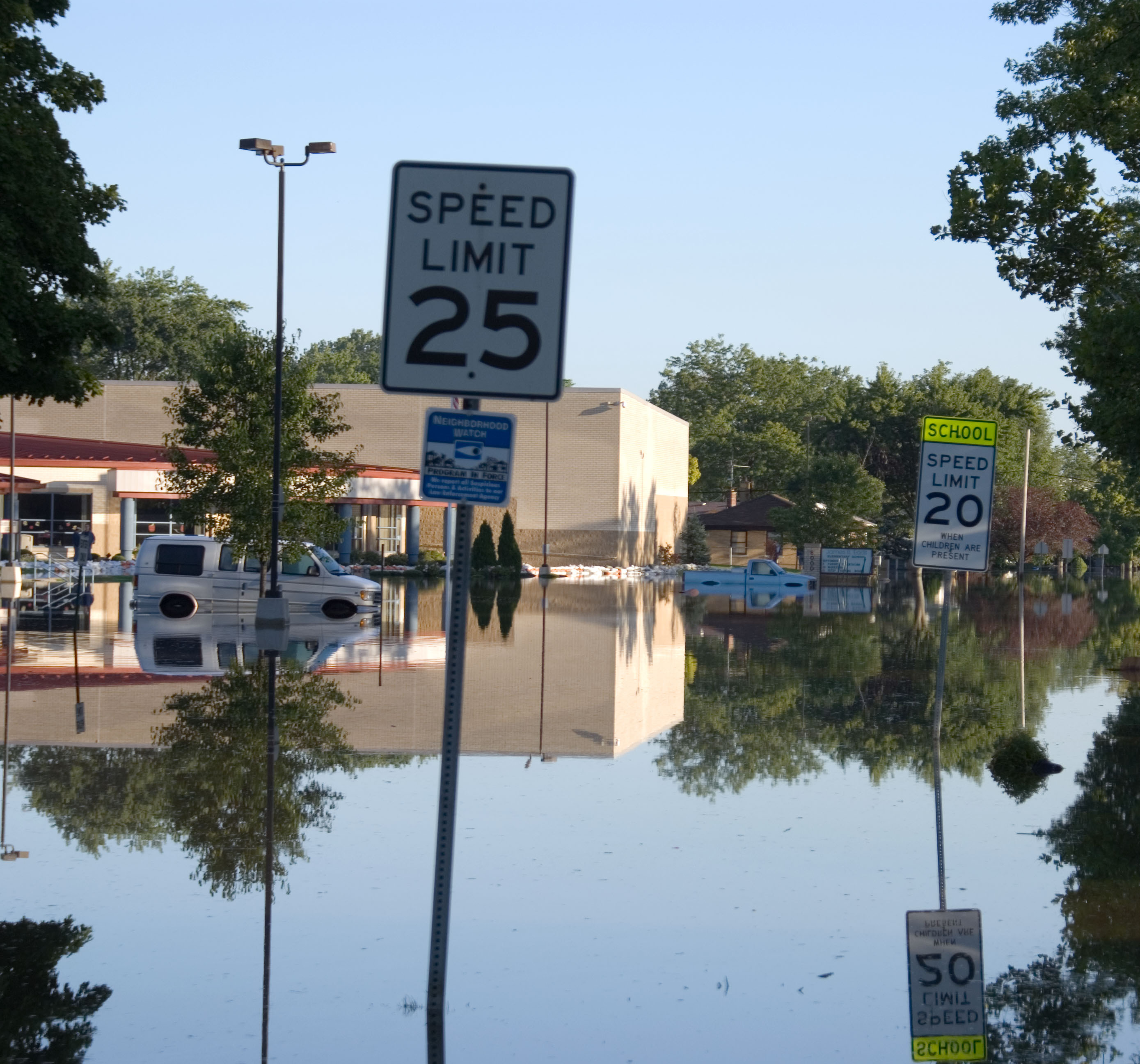
Flooded road, Munster

=== Temperature ===
Average temperatures in Indiana are expected to change and are projected to increase more than 5 °F (2.78 °C) by 2050. The number of extreme cold days is expected to decrease with the warming of the earth. Changes in temperature in Indiana have affected nighttime lows and the date of the first hard freeze.

=== Precipitation ===
According to the EPA "Changing the climate is likely to increase the frequency of floods in Indiana. Over the last half century, average annual precipitation in most of the Midwest has increased by 5 to 10 percent. But rainfall during the four wettest days of the year has increased about 35 percent, and the amount of water flowing in most streams during the worst flood of the year has increased by more than 20 percent. During the next century, spring rainfall and average precipitation are likely to increase, and severe rainstorms are likely to intensify. Each of these factors will tend to further increase the risk of flooding".

=== Ohio River ===
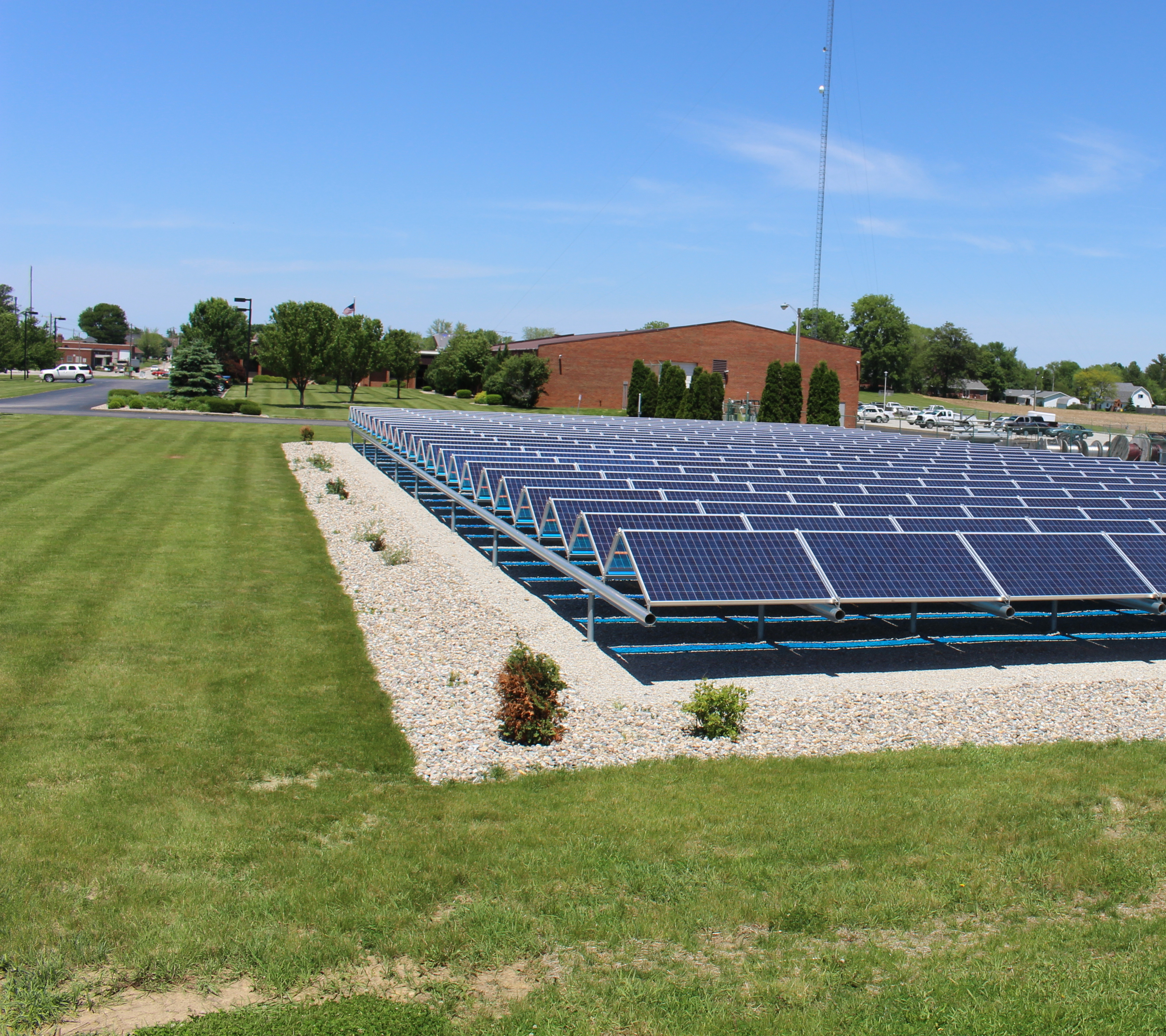
Community Solar Array, Linden

According to the EPA "Flooding occasionally threatens both navigation and riverfront communities, and greater river flows could increase these threats. In 2011, a combination of heavy rainfall and melting snow caused flooding along the Ohio and Wabash rivers in Southern Indiana and closed the lower Ohio River to navigation. Although springtime in Indiana is likely to be wetter, summer droughts are likely to be more severe. Higher evaporation and lower summer rainfall are likely to reduce river flows. The drought of 2005 caused portions of the lower Ohio River to be closed to commercial navigation, which delayed shipments of crops and other products to and from upstream states like Indiana. In 2012, a drought caused navigation restrictions on the lower Mississippi River, which cost the region more than $275 million".

=== Great Lakes ===
According to the EPA "The ice-free season along the Great Lakes is also becoming longer. Between 1994 and 2011, reduced ice cover lengthened the shipping season on the lakes by eight days. The Great Lakes are likely to warm another 3° to 7°F in the next 70 years, which will further extend the shipping season. In Lake Michigan, the changing climate is likely to harm water quality. Warmer water tends to cause more algal blooms, which can be unsightly, harm fish, and degrade water quality. Severe storms also increase the amount of pollutants that run off from land to water, so the risk of algal blooms will be greater if storms become more severe. Increasingly severe rainstorms could also cause sewers to overflow into the lake more often, threatening beach safety and drinking water supplies".

== Economic and social impacts ==
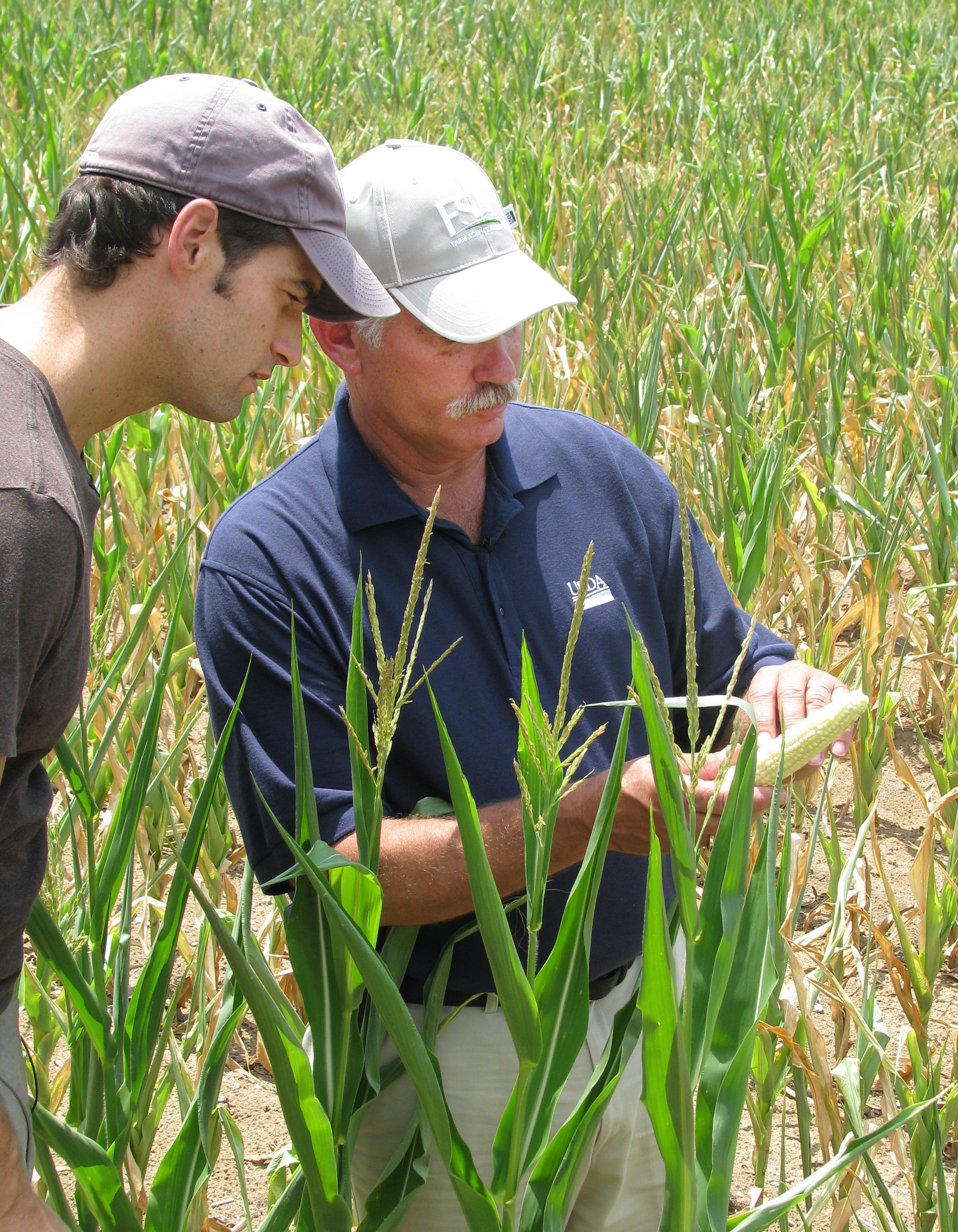
Cornfield in drought, Idaville, 2012

=== Agriculture ===
According to the EPA "Changing the climate will have both beneficial and harmful effects on farming. Longer frost-free growing seasons and higher concentrations of atmospheric carbon dioxide would increase yields for some crops during an average year. But increasingly hot summers are likely to reduce yields of corn and possibly soybeans. Seventy years from now, much of Indiana is likely to have 5 to 15 more days per year with temperatures above 95°F than it has today. More severe droughts or floods would also hurt crop yields".

=== Air pollution and human health ===
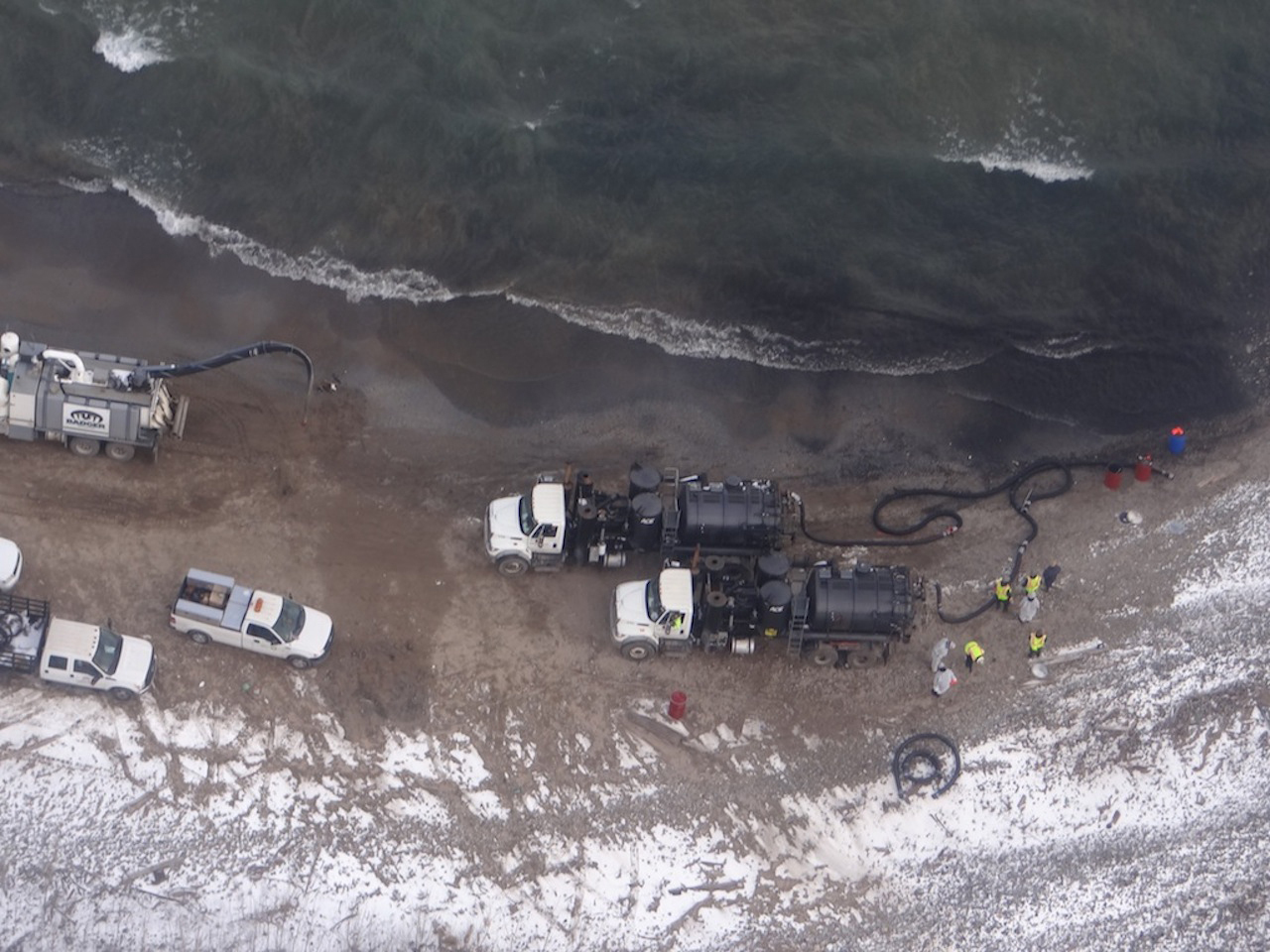
Crude oil spill, Lake Michigan, 2014

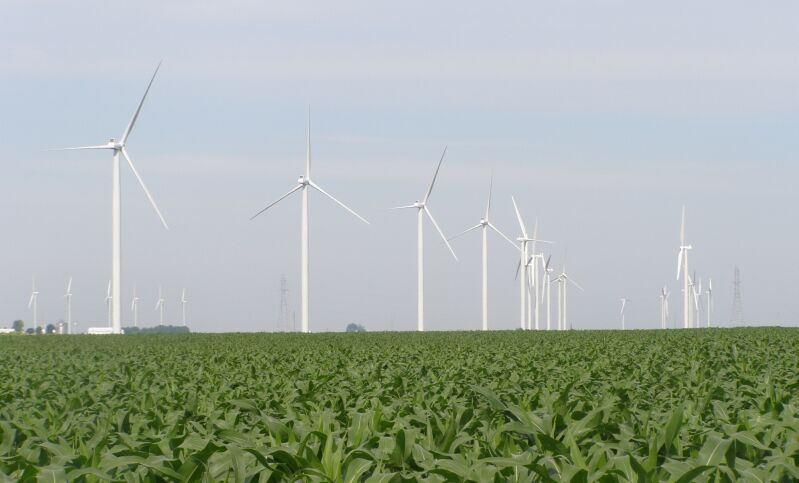
Wind farm, Benton County

According to the EPA "Rising temperatures can harm air quality and amplify existing threats to human health. Warmer weather can increase the production of ground-level ozone, a pollutant that causes lung and heart problems. Ozone also harms plants. In rural Indiana, ozone levels are high enough to significantly reduce yields of soybeans and winter wheat. EPA and the Indiana Department of Environmental Management have been working to reduce ozone concentrations".

According to the EPA "Midwestern cities like Indianapolis are vulnerable to heat waves, because many houses and apartments lack air conditioning, and urban areas are typically warmer than their rural surroundings. In recent decades, severe heat waves have killed hundreds of people across the Midwest. Heat stress is expected to increase as climate change brings hotter summer temperatures and more humidity. Certain people are especially vulnerable, including children, the elderly, the sick, and the poor".

== Responses ==
=== Climate organizations and resilience efforts ===
Earth Charter Indiana has worked to develop leadership in sustainability and climate action for almost 20 years. Its Youth Power Indiana initiative works with students in elementary through high school, and with mayors and municipal officials to develop sustainability and resiliency programs. Young people have advocated climate policy which has been adopted in seven cities: Carmel, Indianapolis, Lawrence, South Bend, Goshen, Bloomington and West Lafayette.

Publicly available data is available to communities and government via the Hoosier Resilience Index, an online database listing information such as "precipitation, flood plain and land use maps – for every community in the state of Indiana."

Carbon Neutral Indiana (CNI) is a non-profit organization that works with households, businesses, and academic institutions to measure, offset, and reduce their carbon footprint. Their goal is to spark a movement amongst Hoosiers to ensure Indiana becomes carbon neutral as soon as possible.

Indiana nonprofits remain uncertain if — or how — some climate grants will progress, under President Donald Trump's January 20, 2025, executive order freezing money from the 2022 Inflation Reduction Act, complicated by related lawsuits filed with various federal courts. Kaylee Dann, executive director of Greater Indiana Clean Cities—which helps administer grants to install electric vehicle chargers across the state—said, "A lot of these locations that are in the inner cities have a lot of traffic. So by putting in charging stations, you're encouraging more zero emission vehicles in those areas, which would lower the impact and that health burden on those communities." The U.S. Department of Transportation (DOT) will issue guidelines in spring 2025 regarding the program to install chargers on interstate highways. But Dann said US DOT already canceled a chargers-focused meeting in Indiana cities and towns — making it unlikely those projects will move forward. Those EV charger stations were to be installed in poorer areas of central and northern Indiana.

== See also ==
- List of U.S. states and territories by carbon dioxide emissions
- Plug-in electric vehicles in Indiana
