= Plug-in electric vehicles in Indiana =

As of April 2021, there were about 7,000 electric vehicles registered in Indiana.

== Government policy ==
As of February 2023, the state government does not offer any tax incentives for electric vehicle purchases. As of July 2023, the state government charges an annual registration fee of $214 for electric vehicles.

== Charging stations ==
As of 2021, there were 215 public AC level 2 charging stations and 19 DC charging stations in Indiana.

The Infrastructure Investment and Jobs Act, signed into law in November 2021, allocates nearly US$100 million to charging stations in Indiana.

In July 2021, the Indiana Department of Transportation and Purdue University began testing pavement that can charge electric vehicles while they are driving; this project is the first of its kind in the United States.

== Manufacturing ==
Indiana was historically a manufacturing hub for gasoline-powered cars, which has led many electric vehicle manufacturers to establish manufacturing hubs in the state.

== By region ==
=== Indianapolis ===
As of October 2021, there were about 400 public charging stations in the Indianapolis metropolitan area.

=== Terre Haute ===
As of March 2021, there were two public DC charging stations in Terre Haute.
