= Indiana Philosophical Association =

Organization founded in 1931

The Indiana Philosophical Association (IPA) is an organization founded in 1931 for the purpose of promoting philosophy in the state of Indiana, United States. The IPA is affiliated with the Central Division of the American Philosophical Association, and sponsors meetings semiannually at colleges and universities in Indiana.
