= List of wineries in Indiana =

Image of Catawba vines at Mallow Run Winery (2022)

The following wineries and vineyards operate wholly or principally in the U.S. state of Indiana. The article for Indiana wine provides an overview of the industry.

There are two American Viticultural Areas (AVA) in Indiana, the multi-state Ohio River Valley AVA, which expands across Kentucky and Ohio, and the Indiana Uplands AVA, located within south-central Indiana.

Indiana wineries produced 6,685,484 gallons in 2025 according to the US Alcohol and Tobacco Tax and Trade Bureau's Wine Annual State Report.

== Wineries ==
Name	Location	Established	Notes	Ref.
Acres Away Winery	Ashley, Indiana	2022	Formerly Hartland Winery (2016–2022)	
Anderson's Orchard and Winery	Valparaiso, Indiana			
At the Barn Winery & Vineyard	Lawrenceburg, Indiana	2013	housed in a refurbished barn (c. 1870); 2019 Best in Class, Foch, Indy International	
Brown County Winery	Nashville, Indiana	1985	2019 Best in Class, Catawba, Indy International	
Buck Creek Winery	Indianapolis, Indiana	2006		
Butler Winery	Bloomington, Indiana	1983	2019 Best in Class, Traminette, Indy International	
Carousel Winery	Mitchell, Indiana			
Chateau Thomas Winery	Plainfield, Indiana	1982		
Country Heritage Winery	LaOtto, Indiana	2011	2026 Indiana Winery of the Year	
Cultured Urban Winery	Anderson, Indiana	2021	family-owned and operated	
Easley Winery	Indianapolis, Indiana	1974		
Farm Hill Winery	Brookville, Indiana			
French Lick Winery	West Baden Springs, Indiana	1995		
Holtkamp Winery and Vineyard	Sunman, Indiana	2013		
Huber Orchard and Winery	Borden, Indiana		Cultivating grapes since 1843; 2019 Best in Class, Vignoles, Indy International	
Lanthier Winery	Madison, Indiana	1994		
Mallow Run Winery	Bargersville, Indiana	2005		
Oliver Winery	Bloomington, Indiana	1972	Largest winery in Indiana; 2019 Best in Class, Ice Wine-style, Indy International	
Owen Valley Winery	Spencer, Indiana	2011		
Peace Water Winery	Carmel, Indiana		2019 Best in Class, Chardonnay (oaked), Indy International	
Running Vines Winery	Chesterton, Indiana		2019 Best in Class, American Blend, Indy International	
Satek Winery	Fremont, Indiana	2001	vineyard started in 1992; 2019 Best in Class, Concord, Indy International	
Tonne Winery	Muncie, Indiana			
Two EE's Winery	Huntington, Indiana	2013	2025 Indiana Winery of the Year	
Urban Vines	Westfield, Indiana			
Vinland Reserve Winery	Fort Wayne, Indiana	2022		
Wildcat Creek Winery	Lafayette, Indiana	2008	2019 Best in Class, Cayuga White, Indy International	

=== Former Wineries ===
Name	Location	Established	Closed	Notes	Ref.
Banholzer Vineyards and Winecellars	New Carlisle, Indiana	1975	early 1990s?		
Golden Raintree Winery	Wadesville, Indiana	1975			
Possum Trot Vineyards	Unionville, Indiana	1978	1991		
Treaty Line Wine Cellars	Liberty, Indiana	1971	1975	Indiana's first production winery	

== See also ==
- American Wine
- List of breweries in Indiana
