= Education segregation in Indiana =

Racial demography

Indiana has some of the most segregated schools in the United States. Despite laws demanding school integration since 1949, a 2017 study by the UCLA Civil Rights Project and Indiana University found that Indiana still has significant segregation in its classrooms.

The average black student in Indiana is likely to attend a school where 68% of the students are non-white. The average white student is likely to attend a school where 81% of the students are white.

== History ==
Indiana became a state in 1816. In 1843 the Legislature stated that the public schools were only for white children between the ages of 5 and 21, and as a result, Quakers and communities of free Black people founded schools like Union Literary Institute for Black students to attend. In 1869, the legislature authorized separate but equal public schools for black children. In 1877, the legislature revised the law to allow black attendance at a white school if a black school was not nearby. Home rule for municipalities meant that application was uneven. Plessy v. Ferguson (1896) legitimized separate but equal as policy. During the 1920s, Indiana became a major base for the Ku Klux Klan, further pushing Black residents away from school districts that had a majority white population. While Indiana being a northern state had little in the way of formalized segregation, the Klan's strong presence in both local and state government and a strong increase in black residents following the first World War, led to public support for segregation in both housing and schooling across the state. Prominent examples of segregated high schools in Indiana in the early 20th Century were Crispus Attucks High School in Indianapolis (opened in 1927) and Theodore Roosevelt High School in Gary (accredited in 1930). In 1946, the Gary School Board issued a non-discriminatory policy. Because neighborhoods had different demographic characteristics, the schools there remained effectively segregated. In 1949, the state adopted language that was unambiguously in favor of integration. It was the last of the northern (non-Confederate) states to do so.

After Brown v. Board of Education, the state still needed a legal push. Bell v. School City of Gary (1963) was the first. Three years later came Copeland v. South Bend Community School Corporation (1967). Three years after that came Banks v. Muncie Community Schools (1970). National policy came the next year in Swann v. Charlotte-Mecklenburg Board of Education (1971), which relied on the Civil Rights Act of 1964.

In the 1970s, the federal answer was court-ordered busing. In Indianapolis, busing began in 1981. The bussing requirements in Indiana however were uneven, they did not require white children to be bussed out Black schools making Black children and parents face most of the consequences of the bussing program. Busing in Indianapolis ended in 2016.

In 2017, the IU School of Education's Center for Evaluation and Education Policy conducted a study with the Civil Rights Project at UCLA. This study revealed that Indiana schools are still deeply segregated due to school district boundaries that are largely determined by income level and race. An example of the connection between economic status and race is found in the case of free meals. Schools with more than half of students receiving free meals are more likely to be attended by non-white students.

== Demographics ==
In the 2010 United States census, 84.4% of Indiana residents reported being white, compared with 73.8% for the nation as a whole.

Indiana, while not having much in the way of slavery, and in-fact outlawing slavery in the state's first constitution with Article VIII, Section 1 expressly banning slavery or any introduction of slavery into the law of the state. The 1840 Census reported three enslaved people and 11,262 “free colored” persons out of a population of 685,866. By 1850, no enslaved people were reported. However, the state was unwelcoming to Black people. The 1851 state constitution said, "No Negro or mulatto shall come into or settle in the State, after the adoption of this Constitution.” In the early 20th century, mechanization of agriculture in the south stimulated immigration of black people to large cities like Indianapolis. Migration accelerated in World War II, slowing only in the 1970s. Simultaneously, white people began to move out of the downtown areas to suburbs, a phenomenon known as white flight.

Latinos were a small portion of Indiana's population prior to 1970. In any case the United States Census Bureau did not reliably track Latinos before the 1970 United States census. The 2000 Census described 3.5% of Indiana's population as Latino. In the next decade, the state's Latino population grew at twice the national rate. In 2010, the state was 6.0% Latino. They have settled more-or-less evenly distributed across the state.

== Studies ==
Since 1996, the relative segregation of classrooms across the United States has been studied by the Civil Rights Project at Harvard until 2007 and subsequently at the Graduate School of Education and Information Studies at UCLA. In 2017, the Project cooperated to with Indiana University to study the conditions in the state.

A 2012 UCLA study showed that Indiana had the sixth most segregated classrooms in America.

== School vouchers ==
Indiana has one of the largest school voucher programs in the United States. Critics contend that vouchers contribute to school segregation. Analysis of two recent studies on vouchers garner mixed support for contributing to segregation; however, both contend that black recipients who had been in a majority-black public school used school vouchers to attend a majority-black private school.
