= Indiana Day =

Indiana state holiday

- Also called: Indiana Statehood Day
- Observed by: Hoosiers (Indiana)
- Type: State holiday
- Significance: Anniversary of the admission of Indiana into the Union
- Date: December 11
- Next time: December 11, 2025
- Frequency: annual

Indiana Day is a legal holiday in the state of Indiana, United States, commemorating the state's 1816 admission to the Union. It was first instituted in 1925 by the Indiana General Assembly. The Indiana Code directs the governor to issue an annual proclamation to observe December 11 as the day statehood was granted to Indiana by the United States Congress and the state's admission to the Union. The law also requires state schools to hold appropriate events to commemorate the event and authorizes public celebrations to be held. Historically the day is commemorated in Indianapolis with speeches and events in the Indiana Statehouse. The day is not a paid holiday, and government employees work on the day. It is more commonly referred to as Indiana Statehood Day.

== See also ==
- List of U.S. states by date of admission to the Union
