= Indiana E-Learning Academy =

Formerly the Indiana Web Academy, the Indiana E-Learning Academy is a program of the Indiana Department of Education. The stated mission of the Indiana E-Learning Academy is to empower the students and educators in the state of Indiana to integrate technology and the Internet with education.

== Related Sites ==
- Indiana E-Learning Academy
- A practitioner's perspective in post learning via e-learning
- Post learning and educational materials in practice
