= Indiana's congressional districts =

In the U.S. House of Representatives

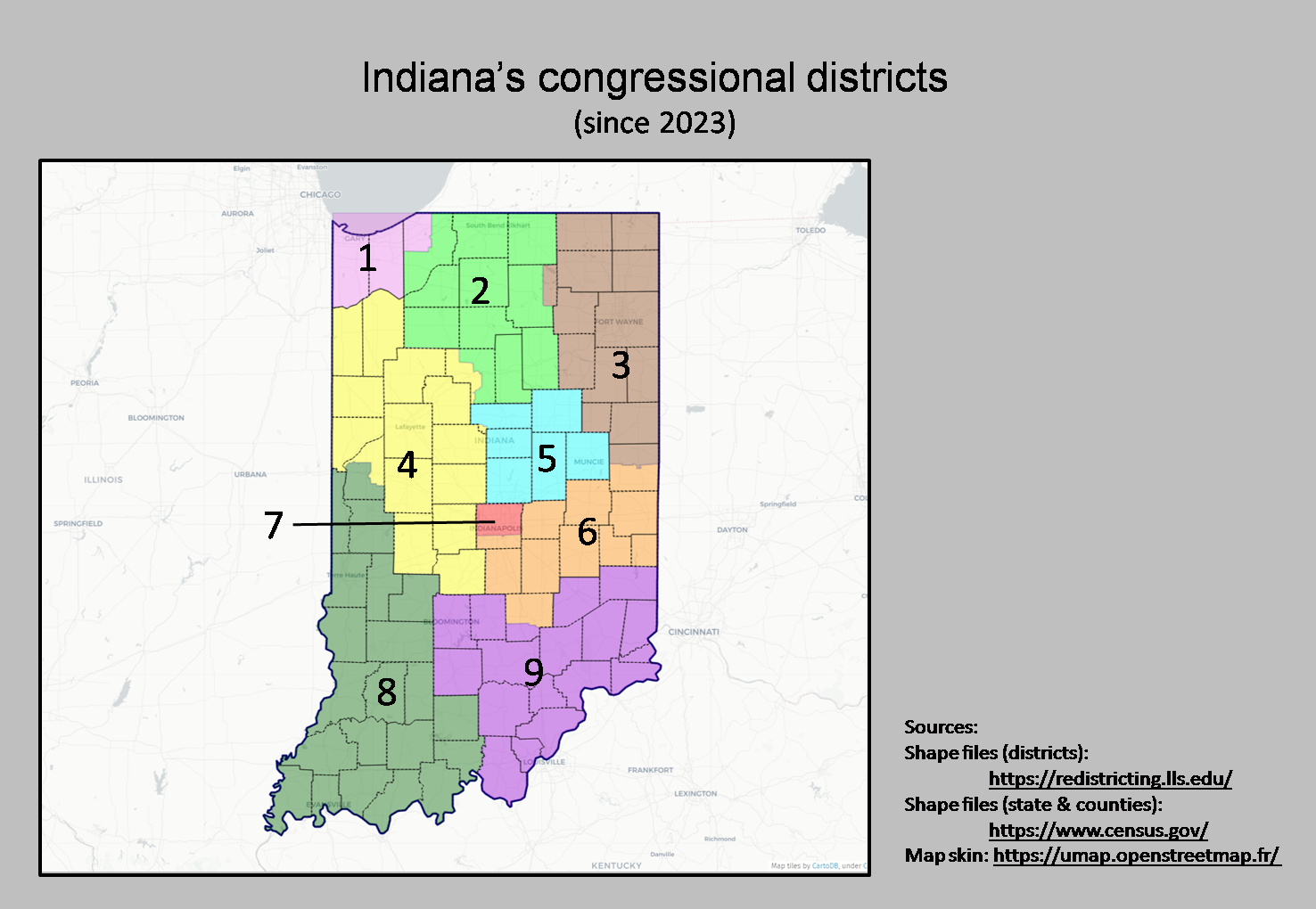
Indiana's congressional districts since 2023 Interactive map version

Indiana has nine congressional districts. They were last redrawn after the 2020 census and took effect in 2023, following the 2022 elections.

== Current districts and representatives ==
This is a list of United States representatives from Indiana, their terms in office, district boundaries, and the district political ratings according to the CPVI. The delegation in the 119th United States Congress has nine members: seven Republicans and two Democrats.

Current U.S. representatives from Indiana
District	Member (residence)	Party	Incumbent since	CPVI (2025)	District map
1st	Frank J. Mrvan (Highland)	Democratic	January 3, 2021	D+1	
2nd	Rudy Yakym (Granger)	Republican	November 14, 2022	R+13	
3rd	Marlin Stutzman (Howe)	Republican	January 3, 2025	R+16	
4th	Jim Baird (Greencastle)	Republican	January 3, 2019	R+15	
5th	Victoria Spartz (Noblesville)	Republican	January 3, 2021	R+8	
6th	Jefferson Shreve (Indianapolis)	Republican	January 3, 2025	R+16	
7th	André Carson (Indianapolis)	Democratic	March 11, 2008	D+21	
8th	Mark Messmer (Jasper)	Republican	January 3, 2025	R+18	
9th	Erin Houchin (Salem)	Republican	January 3, 2023	R+15	

== Historical and present district boundaries ==
Table of United States congressional district boundary maps in the State of Indiana, presented chronologically. All redistricting events that took place in Indiana between 1973 and 2013 are shown.

Year	Statewide map	Indianapolis highlight
1973–1982		
1983–1992		
1993–2002		
2003–2013		
2013–2023		

== Obsolete districts ==
- Indiana Territory's at-large congressional district, obsolete since statehood
- Indiana's 10th congressional district, obsolete since the 2000 census
- Indiana's 11th congressional district, obsolete since the 1980 census
- Indiana's 12th congressional district, obsolete since the 1940 census
- Indiana's 13th congressional district, obsolete since the 1930 census
- Indiana's at-large congressional district (1816–1823; 1873–1875)

== See also ==
- List of United States congressional districts
