= Indiana Department of Administration =

State government agency in Indiana

Agency overview
- Jurisdiction: Indiana
- Agency executive: Brandon Clifton, Commissioner of the Department of Administration
- Parent agency: State of Indiana
- Website: https://www.in.gov/idoa/

The Indiana Department of Administration, or IDOA, is a department level agency of the government of Indiana. The department is managed by the Commissioner of the Department of Administration, who is appointed by the governor of Indiana. The agency oversees many of the administrative areas of the state's bureaus and departments, including procurement, travel, maintenance of public buildings, and surplus. The State Personnel Division was removed from the department and made an independent agency in 2005. The current Commissioner of the Department of Administration is Brandon Clifton.

In 2008 the commissioner was Carrie Henderson, and the agency had approximately 280 employees.

== See also ==
- Government of Indiana
