= Indiana Judicial Nominating Commission =

The Indiana Judicial Nominating Commission, which also serves as the Indiana Judicial Qualifications Commission, is a panel consisting of the chief justice of the Indiana Supreme Court and six other members chosen by those admitted to practice law in Indiana and by the governor of Indiana to select judges to serve on the Indiana Court of Appeals and the Indiana Supreme Court. The commission is part of the judicial branch of the state government and reports directly to the state Supreme Court.

== Duties ==
The commission is responsible for creating a list of three candidates to fill vacant positions on the state judiciary. The commission follows a set of guidelines in the state constitution to determine eligibility for the positions, and to ensure that they only nominate the best qualified candidates that are available. The Governor then chooses a candidate from the list to fill the vacant position. The commission has the authority to choose who, among the sitting supreme court associate justices, will serve as Chief Justice of the Indiana Supreme Court, and, whenever a lower state court has requested that a senior judge be appointed to it, to certify to the Supreme Court whether a person seeking appointment as the senior judge has met the requirements for appointment, as established by the Supreme Court. The commission is also responsible for determining the qualifications of candidates who apply for state judgeship.

The commission is responsible for addressing complaints about the courts and investigating problems within the courts. The commission also audits the judges to ensure compliance with the Code of Judicial Conduct. Although the commission has no power to enforce its decisions, it does submit reports to the Supreme Court, which decides what portion of the commission's recommendations to follow.

The commission is a constitutional body established by article seven of the Constitution of Indiana. In addition to its constitutional authority, the Indiana General Assembly has granted the commission additional statutory authority in the Indiana Code.

== Members ==
The commission has a total of seven members. Further, it is chaired by the Chief Justice of the Indiana Supreme Court, unless the Chief Justice chooses a different justice to chair the commission instead. Three of the other members, who may not be lawyers, are citizens of Indiana appointed by the governor. The remaining three members must be among, and are elected by, those admitted to the practice of law in Indiana. The commission was established in 1970 by a constitutional amendment to replace the previous system of electing judges and justices.

== History ==
Under the original 1816 constitution of Indiana, judges were appointed by the Governor and confirmed by the Indiana Senate, and would serve terms of six years. The system came to be criticized when Governor James B. Ray refused to reappoint two members of the Supreme Court for political reasons. A similar situation occurred during the term of Governor James Whitcomb when he also refused to reappoint two members because he thought they were too slow to resolve cases. In 1851, Indiana adopted a new constitution and the positions on the courts were made publicly elected offices, but that method too quickly came under criticism as the position became even more politicized. The courts remained publicly elected until a series of amendments were passed in 1970 and 1971 that reorganized the state courts and established the Indiana Judicial Nominating Commission to replace the method of publicly electing judges. The new system was intended to make to judicial branch of the government more independent by giving it measure of control over selecting its own members, but limiting their power by making their choice subject, in part, to the approval of the governor.

== Sources ==
- Woollen, William Wesley (1975). Biographical and Historical Sketches of Early Indiana. Ayer Publishing. ISBN 0-405-06896-4.
