= Crossroads Bible College =

Private college in Indianapolis, Indiana, U.S.

Coordinates: 39.7797°N 86.0397°W

- Type: Private Undergraduate College
- Established: 1982
- Students: 214
- Location: Indianapolis, Indiana, U.S.
- Campus: Urban
- Website: www.crossroads.edu

Crossroads Bible College was a private undergraduate Bible college located in Indianapolis, Indiana, United States. It later merged with the College of Biblical Studies.

== History ==
Early in 1980, James S. Wells met with Rev. Ken Davis and Rev. Clint Kaufield to discuss establishing a Bible college in Indianapolis. Baptist Bible College of Indianapolis opened in the Fall of 1980 as an evening school. The school incorporated in 1981. Despite a lack of accreditation, they started to offer bachelor's degrees in 1983. In February 1999 the school established legal accreditation through the Accrediting Association of Bible Colleges, now the Association for Biblical Higher Education.
