= List of colleges and universities in Indiana =

There are approximately 60 colleges and universities of various types, not counting branch campuses, in the U.S. state of Indiana. The Higher Learning Commission is the institutional accrediting agency that has historically accredited many colleges and universities in Indiana.

Additionally, Indiana is home to three public university systems: Indiana University, the Ivy Tech Community College of Indiana, and the Purdue University System.

This list does not include non-independent branch campuses such as Purdue University in Indianapolis or Vincennes University's Jasper campus. Independent regional campuses, such as Indiana University Kokomo, are included.

Indiana has several universities that meet the definition of a flagship institution, with the most commonly cited being Indiana University Bloomington and Purdue University. The Indiana state code designates the Indiana University System as the university of the state.

== Institutions ==
School	Location (Note: School location is based on the Carnegie Classification of Institutions of Higher Education.)	Control (Note: School control is based on the Carnegie Classification of Institutions of Higher Education.) (and religious affiliation, if applicable)	Type (Note: School types are based on the Carnegie Classification of Institutions of Higher Education.)	Enrollment (Fall 2024)	Founded
American College of Education	Indianapolis	Private for-profit	Special-focus institution	14,263	2005
Anabaptist Mennonite Biblical Seminary	Elkhart	Private not-for-profit (Mennonite Church USA)	Special-focus institution	145	1958
Anderson University	Anderson	Private not-for-profit (Church of God)	Master's university	1,228	1917
Ball State University	Muncie	Public	Research university	21,089	1918
Bethany Theological Seminary	Richmond	Private not-for-profit (Church of the Brethren)	Special-focus institution	61	1905
Bethel University	Mishawaka	Private not-for-profit (Missionary Church)	Master's university	1,167	1947
Bishop Simon Bruté College Seminary	Indianapolis	Private not-for-profit (Catholic Church)	Special-focus institution		2004
Butler University	Indianapolis	Private not-for-profit (nonsectarian)	Master's university	5,746	1855
Calumet College of St. Joseph	Whiting	Private not-for-profit (Catholic Church, Missionaries of the Precious Blood)	Master's university	658	1951
Chamberlain University Indiana	Indianapolis	Private for-profit	Special-focus institution	144	1889
Christian Theological Seminary	Indianapolis	Private not-for-profit (Christian Church (Disciples of Christ))	Special-focus institution	151	1924
College of Biblical Studies	Indianapolis Fort Wayne	Private not-for-profit (Non-denominational evangelical)	Special-focus institution		
College of Court Reporting	Hobart	Private for-profit	Associate's college	182	1984
Concordia Theological Seminary	Fort Wayne	Private not-for-profit (Lutheran Church – Missouri Synod)	Special-focus institution	279	1846
DePauw University	Greencastle	Private not-for-profit (United Methodist Church)	Baccalaureate college	1,917	1837
Earlham College	Richmond	Private not-for-profit (Quakers)	Baccalaureate college	753	1847
Fortis College	Indianapolis	Private for-profit	Special-focus institution	322	2008
Franklin College	Franklin	Private not-for-profit (American Baptist Churches USA)	Baccalaureate college	985	1834
Goshen College	Goshen	Private not-for-profit (Mennonite Church USA)	Baccalaureate college	847	1894
Grace College & Seminary	Winona Lake	Private not-for-profit (Charis Fellowship)	Master's university	2,304	1937/1948
Hanover College	Hanover	Private not-for-profit (Presbyterian Church (USA))	Baccalaureate college	1,243	1827
Holy Cross College	Notre Dame	Private not-for-profit (Catholic Church, Congregation of Holy Cross)	Baccalaureate college	661	1966
Huntington University	Huntington	Private not-for-profit (Church of the United Brethren in Christ)	Master's university	1,776	1897
Indiana Bible College	Indianapolis	Private not-for-profit (United Pentecostal Church International)	Special-focus institution		1981
Indiana Institute of Technology	Fort Wayne	Private not-for-profit (secular)	Master's university	2,770	1930
Indiana State University	Terre Haute	Public	Doctoral/professional university	7,895	1865
Indiana University Bloomington	Bloomington	Public	Research university	48,424	1820
Indiana University Columbus (Note: Indiana University–Purdue University Indianapolis split into two institutions on July 1, 2024. The programs in engineering, technology, and computer science became Purdue University in Indianapolis, a fully integrated extension of Purdue University's main campus in West Lafayette. All other programs at the former IUPUI, including the athletics program, became Indiana University Indianapolis. On the same day, Indiana University–Purdue University Columbus became Indiana University Columbus.)	Columbus	Public	Unclassified		2024
Indiana University East	Richmond	Public	Master's university	3,203	1971
Indiana University Fort Wayne (Note: IPFW split into two separate institutions on July 1, 2018. The school's academic programs in health sciences was taken over by Indiana University under the identity of Indiana University Fort Wayne. All other academic programs were assumed by the Purdue University system as Purdue University Fort Wayne. The IPFW athletic program transferred to Purdue Fort Wayne.)	Fort Wayne	Public	Unclassified		2018
Indiana University Indianapolis	Indianapolis	Public	Research university	22,534	2024
Indiana University Kokomo	Kokomo	Public	Master's university	2,921	1945
Indiana University Northwest	Gary	Public	Master's university	3,041	1963
Indiana University South Bend	South Bend	Public	Master's university	4,631	1916
Indiana University Southeast	New Albany	Public	Master's university	3,736	1941
Indiana Wesleyan University	Marion	Private not-for-profit (Wesleyan Church)	Master's university	16,535	1920
International Business College–Indianapolis	Indianapolis	Private for-profit	Associate's college	123	1889
Ivy Tech Community College of Indiana	Statewide (45 locations)	Public	Associate's college	110,710	1963
Lincoln Tech	Indianapolis	Private for-profit	Associate's college	1,052	1946
Manchester University	North Manchester	Private not-for-profit (Church of the Brethren)	Master's university	1,276	1860
Marian University	Indianapolis	Private not-for-profit (Catholic Church, Third Order of Saint Francis)	Doctoral/professional university	3,716	1851
Mid-America College of Funeral Service	Jeffersonville	Private for-profit	Special-focus institution	279	
Oakland City University	Oakland City	Private not-for-profit (General Association of General Baptists)	Doctoral/professional university	640	1885
Purdue University	West Lafayette	Public (land-grant)	Research university	58,658	1869
Purdue University Fort Wayne	Fort Wayne	Public	Master's university	7,206	2018
Purdue University Global	Statewide (online)	Public benefit corporation	Online Doctoral/professional university	45,588	2018
Purdue University Northwest	Hammond; Westville	Public	Master's university	9,051	1946
Rose-Hulman Institute of Technology	Terre Haute	Private not-for-profit (secular)	Special-focus institution	2,334	1874
Saint Mary's College	Notre Dame	Private not-for-profit (Catholic Church, Sisters of the Holy Cross)	Baccalaureate college	1,601	1844
Saint Mary-of-the-Woods College	Saint Mary-Of-The-Woods	Private not-for-profit (Catholic Church, Sisters of Providence of Saint Mary-of-the-Woods)	Master's university	1,159	1840
Saint Meinrad Seminary and School of Theology	Saint Meinrad	Private not-for-profit (Catholic Church, Order of Saint Benedict)	Special-focus institution	183	1857
Salem University–Indianapolis	Indianapolis	Private for-profit	Master's university		1888
South College–Indianapolis	Indianapolis	Private for-profit	Doctoral/professional university		1882
Taylor University	Upland	Private not-for-profit (interdenominational evangelical)	Baccalaureate college	2,548	1846
Trine University	Angola	Private not-for-profit (secular)	Baccalaureate college	14,514	1884
Union Bible College and Academy	Westfield	Private not-for-profit (interdenominational Christian)	Special-focus institution	218	1861
University of Evansville	Evansville	Private not-for-profit (United Methodist Church)	Master's university	2,114	1854
University of Indianapolis	Indianapolis	Private not-for-profit (United Methodist Church)	Doctoral/professional university	5,000	1902
University of Notre Dame	Notre Dame	Private not-for-profit (Catholic Church, Congregation of Holy Cross)	Research university	13,042	1842
University of Saint Francis	Fort Wayne	Private not-for-profit (Catholic Church, Sisters of St. Francis of Perpetual Adoration)	Master's university	1,763	1890
University of Southern Indiana	Evansville	Public	Master's university	9,488	1965
Valparaiso University	Valparaiso	Private not-for-profit (pan-Lutheran)	Doctoral/professional university	2,579	1859
Vincennes University	Vincennes	Public	Baccalaureate/associate's college	19,795	1801
Veritas Baptist College	Greendale	Private not-for-profit (evangelical Baptist)	Special-focus institution	211	1994
Wabash College	Crawfordsville	Private not-for-profit (nonsectarian)	Baccalaureate college	866	1832

Key
Abbreviation	Accrediting agency
AACSB	Association to Advance Collegiate Schools of Business
AAMFT	American Association for Marriage and Family Therapy
AANA	American Association of Nurse Anesthetists
ABA	American Bar Association
ABET	Accreditation Board for Engineering and Technology
ABFSE	American Board of Funeral Service Education
AND	Academy of Nutrition and Dietetics
AOA	American Osteopathic Association
AVMA	American Veterinary Medical Association
ACICS	Accrediting Council for Independent Colleges and Schools
ACPE	Accreditation Council for Pharmacy Education
AALE	American Academy for Liberal Education
ADA	American Dental Association
AOTA	American Occupational Therapy Association
AOA	American Optometric Association
APTA	American Physical Therapy Association
APA	American Psychological Association
ASHA	American Speech–Language–Hearing Association
AARTS	Association of Advanced Rabbinical and Talmudic Schools
ABHE	Association for Biblical Higher Education
ATSCA	Association of Theological Schools in the United States and Canada
CAHME	Commission on the Accreditation of Healthcare Management Education
CCNE	Commission on Collegiate Nursing Education
CELPA	Commission on English Language Program Accreditation
CMTA	Commission on Massage Therapy Accreditation
CEPH	Council on Education for Public Health
DEAC	Distance Education Accreditation Commission
IACBE	International Assembly for Collegiate Business Education
JRCERT	Joint Review Committee on Education Programs in Radiologic Technology
LCME	Liaison Committee on Medical Education
MEAC	Midwifery Education Accreditation Council
NASAD	National Association of Schools of Art and Design
NASD	National Association of Schools of Dance
NASM	National Association of Schools of Music
NAST	National Association of Schools of Theatre
HLC	Higher Learning Commission
NCATE	National Council for Accreditation of Teacher Education
NLNAC	National League for Nursing

== Former institutions ==
- Ancilla College
- Crossroads Bible College
- Harrison College
- Indiana University–Purdue University Columbus
- Indiana University–Purdue University Fort Wayne
- Indiana University–Purdue University Indianapolis
- International Business College
- ITT Technical Institute
- Martin University
- MedTech College
- Purdue University Calumet (Note: Purdue Calumet and Purdue North Central merged to form Purdue Northwest.)
- Purdue University North Central
- Saint Joseph's College
- University of Indianapolis (1896)

== See also ==
- List of college athletic programs in Indiana
- Higher education in the United States
- Lists of American institutions of higher education
- List of recognized higher education accreditation organizations
