= List of Superfund sites in Indiana =

This is a list of Superfund sites in Indiana designated under the Comprehensive Environmental Response, Compensation, and Liability Act (CERCLA) environmental law. The CERCLA federal law of 1980 authorized the United States Environmental Protection Agency (EPA) to create a list of polluted locations requiring a long-term response to clean up hazardous material contaminations. These locations are known as Superfund sites, and are placed on the National Priorities List (NPL). The NPL guides the EPA in "determining which sites warrant further investigation" for environmental remediation. As of June 29, 2022, there have been 53 total Superfund sites on the National Priorities List in Indiana. No additional sites are currently proposed for entry on the list. Thirteen sites have been cleaned up and removed from the list.

== Superfund sites ==
Deleted from National Priorities List

| CERCLIS ID | Name | County | Reason | Site Score | Proposed | Listed | Construction completed | Partially remediated | Remediation Completed |
|---|---|---|---|---|---|---|---|---|---|
| IND016360265 | American Chemical Service, Inc. | Lake | Aquifers beneath the site are contaminated with volatile organic compounds (VOCs) such as benzene, toluene, xylene, and vinyl chloride, and with semi-volatile organic compounds (SVOCs) such as creosote. | 34.98 | Sep 8, 1983 | Sep 27, 1984 | Sep 27, 2004 | – | – |
| IND980904379 | Beck's Lake | St. Joseph | Lead in soil exceeding 400 parts per million. | 50.00 | May 24, 2013 | Dec 12, 2013 | – | – | – |
| IND006418651 | Bennett Stone Quarry | Monroe | This location had been used for dumping of electrical parts, including a large number of PCB-contaminated capacitors by Westinghouse Electric. | 32.55 | Sep 8, 1983 | Sep 21, 1984 | Sep 25, 2000 | – | Sep 14, 2021 |
| INN000510915 | Broadway Street Corridor Groundwater Contamination | Madison | Concentrations of chlorinated volatile organic compounds at or above the Safe Water Drinking Act's Maximum Contaminant Levels found in three municipal wells used for drinking water in Anderson. | 50.00 | Jan 18, 2018 | Sep 13, 2018 | – | – | – |
| IND005480462 | Cam-Or Inc. | LaPorte | Westville site stored and re-refined automotive and industrial oil blends, which contaminated soil and groundwater with hazardous chemicals. | 58.91 | Sep 25, 1997 | Mar 6, 1998 | – | – | – |
| IND016395899 | Carter Lee Lumber Co. | Marion | Soil contaminated with heavy metals including arsenic, cadmium, chromium, copper, cyanide and various volatile organic compounds. | 35.40 | Jun 24, 1988 | Mar 31, 1989 | Sep 29, 1995 | – | Jul 9, 1996 |
| INN000510272 | Cliff Drive Groundwater Contamination | Cass | TCE detected in Logansport wellfield with no source identified, but meets Safe Drinking Water Act standards. | 50.00 | Sep 13, 2018 | May 19, 2019 | – | – | – |
| IND980607626 | Columbus Old Municipal Landfill #1 | Bartholomew | Unpermitted landfill contained solvents, acids, bases, paints and heavy metals leading to soil and groundwater contamination. | 45.34 | Sep 18, 1985 | Jun 10, 1986 | Sep 15, 1994 | – | Jan 24, 2014 |
| IND000715490 | Conrail Rail Yard (Elkhart) | Elkhart | A variety of chlorinated compounds, including TCE and carbon tetrachloride escaped into the local aquifer as a result of accidents and other releases at this site. Groundwater contamination formed two distinct plumes migrating to the St. Joseph River. | 42.24 | Jun 24, 1988 | Aug 30, 1990 | Jul 12, 2004 | – | – |
| IND001213503 | Continental Steel Corp. (Kokomo) | Howard | Chromium, cadmium, arsenic, lead, and iron constituents known to be in the impoundment, in on-site ground water. PCB, Vinyl Chloride, Benzofluoranthene. | 31.85 | Jun 24, 1988 | Mar 31, 1989 | Aug 10, 2011 | – | – |
| IND980607881 | Douglass Road/Uniroyal, Inc. Landfill | St. Joseph | Unlined landfill in Mishawaka at Douglas and Grape Roads included solvents, fly ash, paper, wood stock, rubber and plastic wrap leading to soil and groundwater contamination. | 36.61 | Jun 10, 1986 | Mar 31, 1989 | Sep 19, 2000 | – | – |
| INN000509938 | Elm Street Ground Water Contamination | Vigo | Volatile organic compounds, or VOCS, contaminated several wells in Terre Haute. | 50.00 | Sep 27, 2006 | Mar 7, 2007 | – | – | – |
| IND084259951 | Envirochem Corp. | Boone | North of Zionsville, site contains resins, paint sludges, waste oils and flammable solvents stored in drums and storage tanks. Soil and groundwater were contaminated. | 46.44 | Dec 30, 1982 | Sep 8, 1983 | Sep 3, 2009 | – | – |
| IND074315896 | Fisher-Calo | LaPorte | Former military ordnance plant in Kingsbury contaminated soil and groundwater with PCBs and volatile organic compounds. | 52.05 | Dec 30, 1982 | Sep 8, 1983 | Aug 9, 1998 | – | – |
| IND980679542 | Fort Wayne Reduction Dump | Allen | Landfill site in the floodplain of the Maumee River contaminated soil with volatile organic compounds, heavy metals, PCBs, and polycyclic aromatic compounds. | 42.47 | Oct 15, 1984 | Jun 10, 1986 | Sep 27, 1995 | – | – |
| INN000510959 | Franklin Street Groundwater Contamination | Owen | PCE detected in finished water samples collected from a local water treatment plant in Spencer. | 50.00 | Jan 18, 2018 | May 17, 2018 | – | – | – |
| IND980999635 | Galen Myers Dump/Drum Salvage | St. Joseph | Osceola site's drum reclamation led to soil and groundwater contamination, with many leaky and deteriorating drums noted in 1984. | 42.24 | Jun 24, 1988 | Mar 31, 1989 | Sep 30, 1998 | – | – |
| INN000508642 | Garden City Ground Water Plume | Bartholomew | 3.4 acres of contaminated water in Garden City contains TCE, many homes and businesses require filtered water for drinking. | 50.00 | May 24, 2013 | Dec 12, 2013 | Sep 23, 2021 | – | – |
| INN077005916 | Gary Development Landfill | Lake | Hazardous waste disposal site missing multiple environmental safety requirements, accepted unauthorized hazardous waste. | 30.00 | Mar 10, 2011 | Sep 16, 2011 | – | – | – |
| IND980500292 | Himco Dump | Elkhart | This location was used as a dump for a variety of materials between 1960 and 1976. It was operated by Himco Waste Away. | 42.31 | Jun 24, 1988 | Feb 21, 1990 | Jul 19, 2012 | – | – |
| INT190010876 | International Minerals & Chemicals Corp. (Terre Haute East Plant) | Vigo | Site made, packaged and stored BCH-tech, contaminated soil and groundwater. | 57.80 | Oct 15, 1984 | Jun 10, 1986 | Jun 22, 1988 | – | Feb 11, 1991 |
| INN000508142 | Jacobsville Neighborhood Soil Contamination | Vanderburgh | Jacobsville neighborhood and 12 additional neighborhoods contain lead and arsenic contaminated soil. | 35.52 | Mar 8, 2004 | Jul 22, 2004 | – | – | – |
| INN000510399 | Keystone Corridor Ground Water Contamination | Marion | Groundwater at the Fall Creek well field contains chlorinated solvents. | 50.00 | May 24, 2013 | Dec 12, 2013 | – | – | – |
| INN000510479 | Kokomo Contaminated Ground Water Plume | Howard | Vinyl Chloride and arsenic have been detected in several of the City of Kokomo's municipal water wells. | 50.00 | Sep 22, 2014 | Mar 26, 2015 | – | – | – |
| IND980500524 | Lake Sandy Jo (M&M Landfill) | Lake | Landfill on site contained various wastes including construction and demolition debris, garbage and industrial wastes, and alleged buried drums. | 38.21 | Dec 30, 1982 | Sep 8, 1983 | Sep 20, 1994 | Jul 26, 2021 | – |
| IND064703200 | Lakeland Disposal Service, Inc. | Kosciusko | Site near Claypool includes general refuse and hazardous wastes including cyanide and heavy metals. | 34.10 | Jun 24, 1988 | Mar 31, 1989 | Sep 26, 2002 | – | – |
| INN000510229 | Lane Street Ground Water Contamination | Elkhart | Site includes a plume of contaminated groundwater, including TCE and other chlorinated solvents. | 40.53 | Apr 9, 2009 | Sep 23, 2009 | – | – | – |
| IND980794341 | Lemon Lane Landfill | Monroe | Allegedly, wastes were incinerated on-site. No records were kept of the types or quantities of wastes received. Of primary concern are large quantities of exposed capacitors containing PCBs. | 29.31 | Dec 30, 1982 | Sep 8, 1983 | Sep 26, 2012 | – | Sep 14, 2021 |
| IND982073785 | Lusher Street Ground Water Contamination | Elkhart | 870 acre site contains contaminated groundwater, including volatile organic compounds. | 50.00 | Sep 19, 2007 | Mar 19, 2008 | – | – | – |
| IND980794358 | Main Street Well Field | Elkhart | The largest well field owned by Elkhart, containing 70% of the city's drinking water, groundwater is contaminated with volatile organic compounds such as TCE. | 42.49 | Dec 30, 1982 | Sep 8, 1983 | Sep 28, 1995 | – | – |
| IND980794366 | Marion (Bragg) Dump | Grant | RCA, Bragg Construction Company, and Waste Reduction Systems combined to release 1.1 million cubic yards of wastes, including hazardous solvents, plasticizers, lead, and cadmium. | 35.25 | Dec 30, 1982 | Sep 8, 1983 | Sep 30, 19977 | – | – |
| IND980615421 | MIDCO I | Lake | After 14,000 drums of hazardous wastes burned in a 1976 fire, thousands of drums of hazardous waste were left at the facility following its abandonment in 1979. Soil, sediment, surface water and groundwater were contaminated. | 46.44 | Dec 30, 1982 | Sep 8, 1983 | Mar 16, 2017 | – | – |
| IND980679559 | MIDCO II | Lake | An estimated 50,000-60,000 drums of hazardous wastes were destroyed in the 1976 fire, which stored waste solvents, neutralized acids and caustics, and dumped waste. Soil and groundwater were contaminated. | 30.16 | Oct 15, 1984 | Jun 10, 1986 | Sep 4, 2020 | – | – |
| IND980794549 | Neal's Dump (Spencer) | Owen | Former disposal site for industrial wastes produced by Westinghouse Electric, including electrical capacitors containing PCBs, capacitor parts, PCB-contaminated rags and sawdust, contaminating groundwater. | 36.55 | Oct 15, 1984 | Jun 10, 1986 | Mar 17, 1999 | – | Oct 4, 1999 |
| IND980614556 | Neal's Landfill (Bloomington) | Monroe | Capacitors and arrestors containing PCBs, as well as PCB-contaminated capacitor insulation material, rags, and filter clay, were disposed of at the landfill by Westinghouse Electric. | 42.93 | Dec 30, 1982 | Sep 8, 1983 | Jul 19, 2012 | – | Sep 14, 2021 |
| IND980794432 | Ninth Avenue Dump | Lake | 17-acre site contains soil and groundwater contaminated with hazardous chemicals. | 40.32 | Dec 30, 1982 | Sep 8, 1983 | Sep 25, 1995 | – | – |
| INN000510667 | North 5th Street Groundwater Contamination | Elkhart | Groundwater plume of chlorinated solvents contaminated four Goshen municipal wells for drinking water. | 50.00 | Sep 9, 2021 | Mar 16, 2022 | – | – | – |
| INSFN0507828 | North Shore Drive | Elkhart | 70-acre site along St. Joseph River contains volatile organic compounds. Five of 47 residences on site exceeded Safe Drinking Water Act Maximum Contaminant Levels. | 50.00 | May 12, 2014 | Sep 22, 2014 | – | – | – |
| IND050530872 | Northside Sanitary Landfill, Inc. | Boone | Site near Zionsville contains soil and groundwater contaminated with hazardous wastes. | 46.04 | Sep 8, 1983 | Sep 21, 1984 | Sep 3, 1996 | – | – |
| INN000508678 | Pike and Mulberry Streets PCE Plume | Morgan | 38-acre groundwater plume is contaminated with PCE and other chlorinated solvents, affecting one of Martinsville's municipal drinking water wells, serving 15,000 people. | 50.00 | Sep 18, 2012 | May 24, 2013 | – | – | – |
| IND980684583 | Poer Farm | Hancock | About 275 drums of waste solvents and paint resins were stored on site and began leaking after an abandoned bridge and barn painting project. | 37.38 | Sep 8, 1983 | Sep 21, 1984 | Aug 18, 1989 | – | Feb 11, 1991 |
| IND006377048 | Prestolite Battery Division | Knox | Prestolite Battery facility manufactured lead-acid batteries for the automotive industry, contaminated soil with lead and PCBs. Additionally contaminated groundwater, sediment and surface water with volatile organic compounds. | 40.63 | Jun 24, 1988 | Oct 4, 1989 | May 22, 1997 | – | – |
| IND000807107 | Reilly Tar & Chemical Corp. (Indianapolis Plant) | Marion | Site contaminated with hazardous chemicals from wood preserving operations. | 34.03 | Sep 8, 1983 | Sep 21, 1984 | Dec 16, 1999 | – | – |
| IND040313017 | Seymour Recycling Corp. | Jackson | About 98 storage tanks and 50,000 drums from a processing center for waste chemicals contaminated soil and groundwater. | – | Dec 30, 1982 | Sep 8, 1983 | Sep 8, 1993 | – | – |
| IND980607360 | Southside Sanitary Landfill | Marion | A still active solid waste disposal facility, an estimated four million cubic yards of hazardous waste, including coal tar, asbestos, iron oxide and clarifier sludges, and paint waste, were buried, leading to soil and groundwater contamination. | 41.94 | Jun 10, 1986 | Mar 31, 1989 | Sep 25, 1995 | – | Jul 3, 1997 |
| IND980997639 | Tippecanoe Sanitary Landfill, Inc. | Tippecanoe | Lafayette landfill, which includes a wetland, contains 3.4 million cubic yards of solid waste, including industrial sludge with elevated levels of PCBs. | 42.24 | Jun 24, 1988 | Aug 30, 1990 | Sep 27, 2001 | – | – |
| IND006038764 | Tri-State Plating | Bartholomew | Electroplating operations at the site in Columbus contaminated soil and groundwater with cyanide and heavy metals, including chromium. | 29.28 | Sep 18, 1985 | Jun 10, 1986 | Jun 10, 1992 | – | Jul 14, 1997 |
| IND047030226 | U.S. Smelter and Lead Refinery, Inc. | Lake | Listed in 2009 on the NPL as one of the most contaminated sites in the country, the site includes parts of the former USS Lead facility and commercial, municipal and residential areas in East Chicago. The site's primary concerns are lead and arsenic. | 58.31 | – | Apr 9, 2009 | – | – | – |
| IND980504005 | Waste, Inc., Landfill | LaPorte | Landfill operations contaminated soil, leachate or groundwater with hazardous chemicals. | 50.63 | Apr 10, 1985 | Jul 22, 1987 | Dec 18, 1997 | – | Oct 20, 2008 |
| IND048989479 | Wayne Waste Oil | Whitley | Wayne Waste Oil, a division of Wayne Reclamation and Recycling, Inc., deposited about one million gallons of oil-related wastes on site. Waste disposal operations contaminated soil and groundwater with hazardous chemicals. | 42.33 | Dec 30, 1982 | Sep 8, 1983 | Jun 30, 1995 | – | – |
| IND980794374 | Wedzeb Enterprises, Inc. | Boone | Used electrical equipment, including capacitors and transformers containing polychlorinated biphenyls, were stored at the Lebanon Wedzeb site. Water from a 1981 fire leaked into a sanitary sewer line. | 31.27 | Dec 30, 1982 | Sep 8, 1983 | Sep 26, 1990 | – | Sep 10, 1991 |
| IND980999791 | Whiteford Sales & Service Inc./Nationalese | St. Joseph | A truck washing and leasing company operated on site in South Bend. Detergents and solvents used by the operation were discharged to three dry wells on site, contaminating soil and groundwater with hazardous chemicals. | 51.87 | Jun 24, 1988 | Aug 30, 1990 | Sep 29, 1995 | – | Sep 6, 1996 |

== See also ==
- List of Superfund sites in the United States
- List of environmental issues
- List of waste types
- TOXMAP
