= Samuel Gookins =

American judge (1809–1880)

Samuel Barnes Gookins (May 30, 1809 in Rupert, Vermont – June 14, 1880 in Terre Haute, Indiana) was an American journalist, lawyer, politician, and judge of the Indiana Supreme Court.

== Early life ==
Gookins was the youngest of ten children. In 1812 his parents William and Rhoda Gookins moved with most of their children to Rodman, New York, near the eastern end of Lake Ontario. Gookins' father died two years later. In 1823 Gookins' mother took him and an older brother west to settle about two miles outside of Terre Haute, Indiana, where other members of the family had settled three years earlier.

In July 1825 Gookins' mother died, and he was sent to live first with the family of Captain Daniel Stringham (father of Admiral Silas Stringham) and later with several of his older siblings. In 1826 he was apprenticed to John Osborn, the editor of the Western Register newspaper in Terre Haute. After completing his apprenticeship in 1830, he moved to Vincennes and started a newspaper there with a partner. After a year he moved back to Terre Haute to become the editor of the Western Register, until the paper was purchased in June 1832 and replaced by the Wabash Courier.

== Career ==
Gookins was about to depart for Washington, DC to pursue his editorial career when he was talked into reading for the bar by his friend Amory Kinney (one of the lawyers who had pursued the 1820 Polly v. Lasselle anti-slavery case). Gookins was admitted to the Vigo County bar in 1834 and the Indiana Supreme Court bar in 1836, and practiced until 1850, when he was appointed to a brief term as a replacement for the local circuit court judge. In 1851 Gookins was elected to the legislature, which had the job of passing new laws in the wake of a new Indiana constitution. Gookins and other lawyers proposed that each party nominate two candidates for the four member supreme court, to maintain balance, but their views were ignored in the subsequent elections. Gookins himself was nominated for an Indiana Supreme Court position by the Whigs in 1852, but their slate was defeated. Gookins ran again in 1855 for a vacant seat on the court and won.

In December 1857 Gookins resigned from the court due to ill health and financial pressures; the salary of the justices was only $1200, which Gookins considered low. He then moved to Chicago and continued his legal career there until 1875, when he moved back to Terre Haute. Gookins and his partners argued many cases before the US Supreme Court.

Gookins wrote newspaper articles and contributed a small number of political satires to the literary magazines. In the last years of his life he wrote a history of Vigo County, published posthumously in 1880 as part of Henry Beckwith's History of Parke and Vigo Counties.

== Personal life ==
Gookins married Mary Caroline Osborn, daughter of his old master editor John Osborn, in 1834. They had four children, of which two survived to adulthood – artist James Farrington Gookins (1840–1904) and Lucy Gookins Duy (1838–1925).
