= James Scott (judge) =

American judge (1767–1855)

Justice of the Indiana Supreme Court
- In office December 28, 1816 – December 28, 1830
- Appointed by: Jonathan Jennings, William Hendricks
- Succeeded by: Stephen Stevens

James Scott (May 28, 1767 – March 2, 1855) was an American lawyer, judge, and politician from the state of Indiana. Scott served as one of the first Justices of the Indiana Supreme Court from December 28, 1816, to December 28, 1830. He was also an important figure in the early history of Indiana University.

== Biography ==
=== Early life and career ===
Born in Pennsylvania, the details of Scott's early life are not well recorded.

Scott left Pennsylvania and moved to Clark County, Indiana. Scott lived in Charlestown, where he helped found a Sunday school, held inside the local courthouse. In 1810, William Henry Harrison, Governor of the Indiana Territory, appointed Scott to be Clark County's prosecutor.

Scott was elected to the Indiana Territory's House of Representatives in 1813, where he served briefly as the Speaker of the House before resigning to become a chancery judge.

Scott was an unsuccessful candidate for United States senator in 1816.

In 1816, Scott became one of forty-three delegate to Indiana's constitutional convention to help draft the new state's constitution. The convention was held in Corydon. At the convention, Scott served as the chairman for a committee to draft the constitution's article on education. The committee would lay the groundwork for Indiana's public education system. He also chaired a committee on the constitution's judicial provisions.

=== Judicial service ===
Jonathan Jennings, Indiana's first state governor, appointed Scott to be a Justice on the newly created Indiana Supreme Court. Scott was present at the Supreme Court's first meeting in Corydon on May 5, 1817. Scott and his fellow Justices heard the case Polly v. Lasselle regarding slavery in Indiana. The case regarded the ownership of an enslaved woman, Polly, by General Hyacinth Laselle of Vincennes. The Supreme Court overturned a ruling by a Knox County court in favor of Laselles, demanding Polly be set free. Scott wrote the unanimous opinion of the court: "The framers of our constitution intended a total and entire prohibition of slavery in this State; and we can conceive of no form of words in which that intention could have been expressed more clearly". Scott was reappointed for a second term on the Supreme Court by Governor William Hendricks.

In 1827, while serving on the Supreme Court, the General Assembly made Scott president of a team of five observers to visit Indiana State Seminary in Bloomington and report back to legislature on the success of the school and its students. Scott requested the Assembly upgrade the Seminary into a college. His request was granted by the Assembly and Indiana State Seminary became Indiana College (now known as Indiana University Bloomington). In 1828, Scott was appointed to Indiana College's Board of Visitors, where he served as a liaison between the college and the Assembly. Scott would continue to be involved with the college after his tenure on the Supreme Court ended. Scott served on the college's Board of Trustees from 1841 to 1850. In 1844, Scott received an honorary LL.D. from the college.

Scott would serve on the Supreme Court until 1830, when he and his fellow Justice Jesse Holman were controversially replaced by Governor James B. Ray with Justices Stephen Stevens and John T. McKinney, both state senators at the time. Many in the General Assembly were outraged by Scott and Holman's abrupt replacement, but both Stevens and McKinney were eventually confirmed by the legislature to serve on the Supreme Court.

After leaving the Supreme Court, Scott returned to practice law in Charlestown. He also began to publish a local newspaper, the Comet. Following William Henry Harrison's victory in the 1840 presidential election, Scott was hired as a registrar at the federal land office in Jeffersonville. He was fired following James K. Polk's victory in the 1844 presidential election. Scott moved back to Charlestown and opened a girls' school.

=== Personal life and death ===
Scott was married but had no biological children. He and his wife adopted and raised a daughter.

Shortly before his death, he relocated to Carlisle, Indiana, where he died in 1855.

Political offices
Preceded by Newly established court	Justice of the Indiana Supreme Court; 1816–1830	Succeeded by Stephen Stevens
