= Amory Kinney =

American lawyer

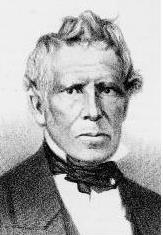
- Born: April 13, 1793 (Note: His birth date is also stated as April 13, 1791. His death record states he was born on April 13, 1792. His marriage record to Mary Hobart states he was born in 1792.); Bethel, Vermont, U.S.
- Died: November 20, 1859 (aged 68) (Note: His death record states his date of death was November 20, 1859 and a notice of his death was published on November 21, 1859. His date of death is also published as November 30, 1859.); Plainfield, Vermont, U.S.
- Education: Read law with Samuel Nelson
- Occupations: Attorney, legislator, judge
- Known for: Landmark freedom suit State v. Lasselle
- Spouses: Hannah Bishop (m. 1821; died 1831) Lucy Bishop (m. 1833, d. by 1852) Mary Hobart (m. 1852)

Amory Kinney (April 13, 1793 – November 20, 1859) was an American abolitionist and attorney who represented Polly Strong in the landmark State v. Lasselle case, tried in the Indiana Supreme Court, that freed Strong and set a precedent for other enslaved people in the state of Indiana. The following year, he represented Mary Bateman Clark, an indentured servant, and won her freed at the state Supreme Court. The cases foretold the end of bondservants in Indiana.

He served three terms as a member of the Indiana House of Representatives, during which he codified the Indiana statutes and advocated for free schools. He also drafted Terre Haute, Indiana's first ordinances when he sat on the town council. For a few years, he was the publisher of The Western Register in Terre Haute, where he served on the board of trustees for the Terre Haute Public School.

== Personal life and education ==
Amory Kinney, the son of Congregational minister Jonathan Kinney, was born April 13, 1793, in Bethel, Vermont. He left the state for Cortlandville, New York, in 1815, to study law under Samuel Nelson, who was later a U.S. Supreme Court Chief Justice.

Kinney married Hannah Bishop on January 6, 1821, in Knox County, Indiana. She was the daughter of Thomas L. Bishop, Esquire of Homer, New York. After living in Vincennes, they moved to Terre Haute, Indiana, in 1826. Hannah died on September 2, 1831. He then married Hannah's sister Lucy in 1833. He was married a third time to Mary Hobart in 1852. Mary was born in Vermont in 1813.

He helped found the First Congregational Church in 1835. Kinney went to Vermont to improve his health. He died in Plainfield, Vermont, on November 20, 1859, of a heart attack.

== Career ==
Kinney moved to Vincennes, Indiana. John W. Osborn, a friend and his brother-in-law, also moved to Vincennes and became the editor of the newspaper The Western Sun. Osborn married Hannah's sister, Ruby.

On February 12, 1819, Kinney was admitted to practice law in Indiana Circuit Courts. Osborn, also an attorney, was Kinney's law partner. They worked with Moses Tabbs and Col. George McDonald to represent Polly Strong in her court cases against her slaveholder. (Note: Col. George McDonald's son-in-law was Judge Isaac Blackford (second Chief Justice of the Indiana Supreme Court). Moses Tabbs' father-in-law was Charles Carroll, who was a signer of the Declaration of Independence.)

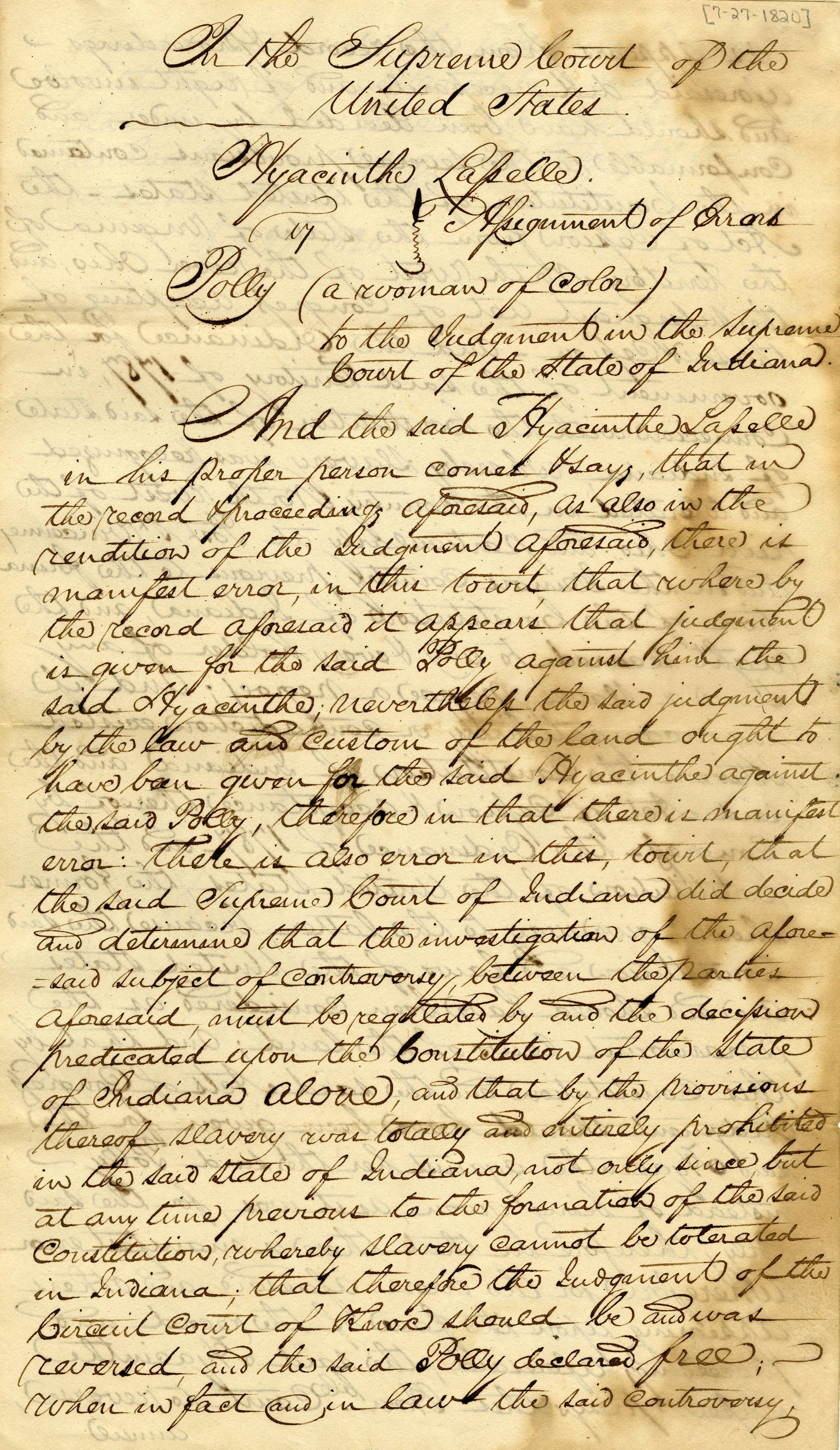
July 27th,1820 Assignment of errors to the U.S. Supreme Court

Since she was born after the Northwest Ordinance that prohibited slavery, and slavery was prohibited by the Constitution of Indiana of 1816, they felt that she should be free. The case was first tried in the Knox County Circuit Courts, which ruled that Strong should remain enslaved. In the State v. Lasselle case they appealed the decision with the Indiana Supreme Court. The court ruled on July 22, 1820, that the Indiana Constitution made it clear that "slavery can have no existence in the State of Indiana". She was freed and the case set a precedent for other enslaved people to argue for their freedom. After the verdict, Kinney suffered significant injuries after being attacked by a proslavery mob.

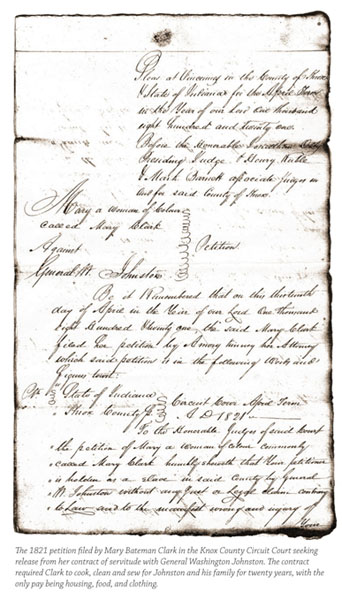
Mary, a woman of color, called Mary Clark v. General W. Johnston, 1821, Knox County, Indiana Circuit Court

In 1821, Kinney filed a suit, Mary Clark, a woman of color vs. General W. Johnston, to free an indentured servant, Mary Bateman Clark. As with Strong's case, Clark lost in the Circuit Court, but appealed the decision with the Indiana Supreme Court, where they won with the Supreme Court ruling on November 6, 1821. This was a landmark case for indentured servants and foretold the end of bondservants in Indiana.

He was admitted to the Terre Haute bar in 1824. Two years later, the Kinneys moved to Terre Haute, Indiana, following the Osborns who moved there a few years earlier. In 1827, Kinney was appointed justice of the peace. He published The Western Register from 1828 to 1830. Osborn founded the paper, sold it to Kinney, who sold it back to the journalist.

In 1830, Kinney was elected to the Indiana House of Representatives, serving Vigo County, Indiana, along with George W. Cutter. Kinney led a group that codified Indiana statutes in 1830, resulting in the Indiana Revised Code of 1831. He served a third term as a legislator in 1846, where he backed establishment of free schools. (Note: Conduit states that he was elected as legislator in 1847–1848.) Kinney believed in graded schools for all children, with grades providing a measure of their progress. He was appointed presiding judge in 1831 by Governor Noah Noble, and he served as a circuit court judge from 1831 to 1838. Terre Haute was incorporated in 1838 and Kinney was a member of the town council for its first two years. During that time, he drafted the town's first ordinances.

Kinney started the law firm Kinney, Wright and Gookins with Samuel Barnes Gookins and Salmon Wright, which operated for seven years. George W. Cutter and other students read law with him. From 1852 to 1856, Kinney served as the first judge of the Vigo County Court of Common Pleas. He served on the board of trustees for the Terre Haute Public School beginning in January 1853.

His law partner Samuel Gookins said of him, "With a clear, comprehensive and scrutinizing apprehension of legal principles he combined a firm, conscientious, and discriminating sense of justice and right."
