= General Washington Johnston =

American politician

General W. Johnston

Member of the Indiana Territory Legislature from the Knox County, Indiana district

Member of the Indiana State Assembly from the Knox County, Indiana district 1821, 1822, 1826, 1829

Personal details
- Born: General Washington Johnston; November 10, 1776 Culpepper County, Virginia
- Died: October 26, 1833 (aged 56)
- Education: Read law in Louisville, Kentucky
- Occupation: Lawyer, legislator
- Known for: Early settler and attorney of Vincennes, Indiana; Founder of Vincennes Masonic Lodge #1; Defendant in Clark vs. G.W. Johnston

Military service
- Branch/service: United States Army
- Unit: William Henry Harrison
- Battles/wars: Battle of Tippecanoe

General Washington Johnston (November 10, 1776 – October 26, 1833) was born in Culpeper County, Virginia. General was his given name. At the age of 17, he was among the first people to permanently settle in the wildness area of the Northwest Territory (1787–1803), in what is now Vincennes, Indiana. He read law in Louisville, Kentucky. In February 1799, he became the first man in the territory admitted to the bar.

Among Johnston's firsts in Vincennes and the Indiana Territory, he is generally considered the founder of Vincennes Masonic Lodge #1, F.&A.M. in 1809 (originally Vincennes Lodge #15 under the jurisdiction of the Grand Lodge of Kentucky). Johnston served several terms as Worshipful Master of Vincennes Lodge and many terms in different Grand Lodge offices.

Johnston served in the Territorial Legislature during the 1807 and 1808 sessions, and he fought at the Battle of Tippecanoe in 1811.

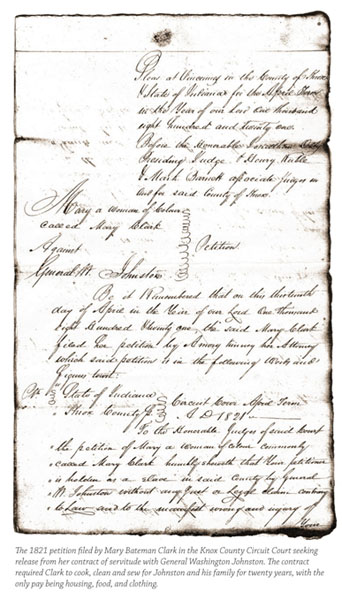
Mary, a woman of color, called Mary Clark v. General W. Johnston, 1821, Knox County, Indiana Circuit Court

He was the defendant in the landmark Indiana Supreme Court case of Mary Clark v. General W. Johnston. Johnston had purchased Mary Bateman Clark's indenture from Benjamin Harrison on October 24, 1816, the same year of the passage of the Constitution of Indiana, which prohibited slavery and indentured servitude. She was purchased for $350 and was to serve Johnston for 20 years. Johnston claimed that she voluntarily entered into the indenture arrangement. Clark sued for her freedom, and after losing in the Knox County Circuit Court, she appealed to the state Supreme Court, in Mary Clark v. G.W. Johnston. She was freed upon the justices's ruling that the constitution clearly stated that indentured servitude was prohibited in the state.

He served in the Indiana General Assembly in the years 1821, 1822, 1826, and 1829. During the 1822 session, he served as Speaker of the House. His most notable contribution might have occurred in 1808 when the Indiana Territory was considering allowing enslaved people to be brought into the state. The Legislature was evenly divided on the subject. Johnston, seeming to be pro-slavery, delivered a "forceful indictment against human slavery" that swayed the body and won the day.

He died at his home in 1833. A monument was established in the Greenlawn Cemetery in Vincennes by the Masons in 1923. It is a memorial to his service in Indiana.
