= History of slavery in Indiana =

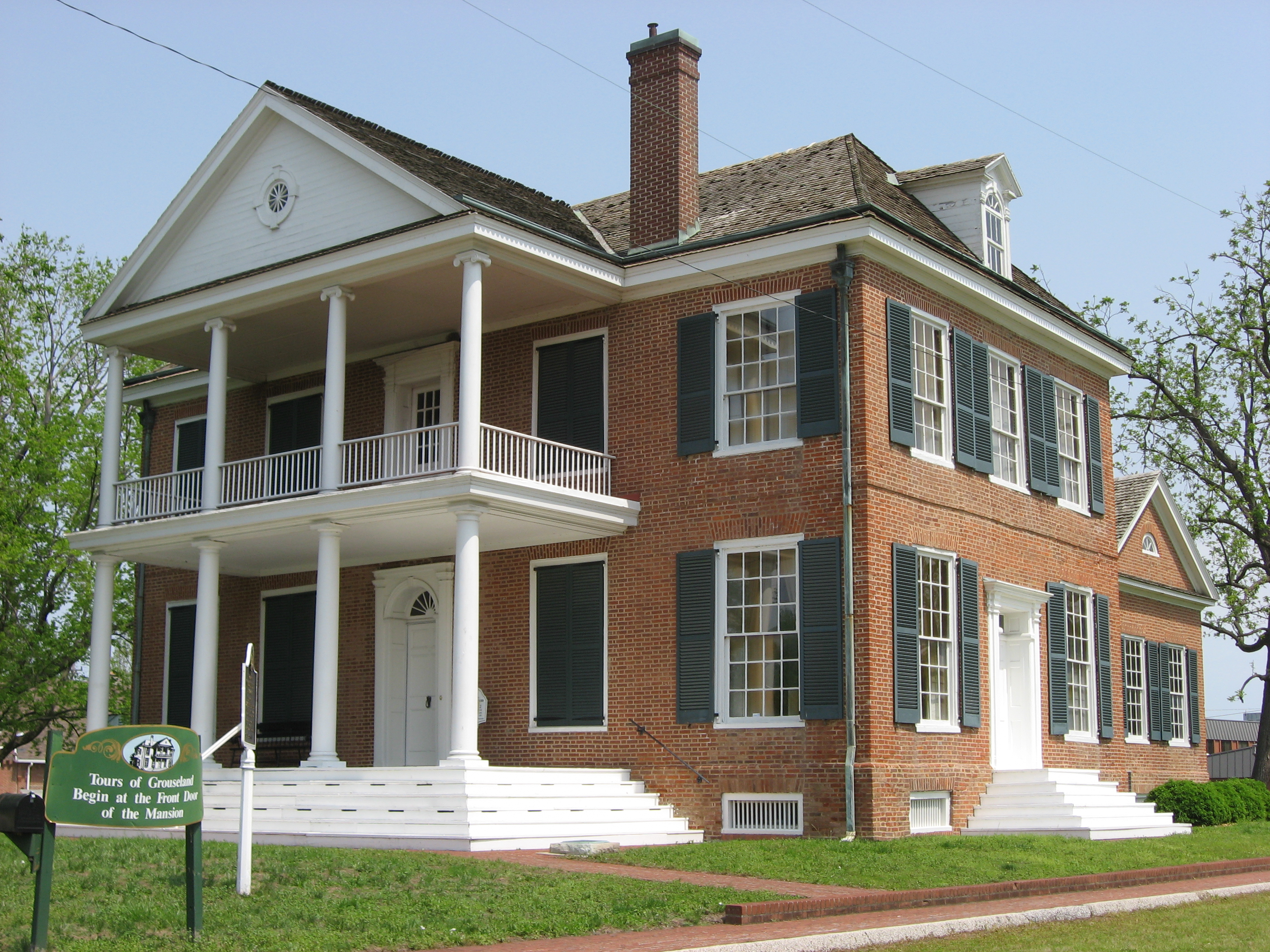
Grouseland, Territorial Governor's Mansion of William Henry Harrison in Vincennes, Indiana

Slavery in Indiana occurred between the time of French rule during the late seventeenth century and 1826, with a few traces of slavery afterward.

Opposition to slavery began to organize in Indiana around 1805, and in 1809 abolitionists took control of the territorial legislature and overturned many of the laws permitting retaining of slaves. By the time Indiana was granted statehood in 1816, the abolitionists were in firm control and slavery was banned in the constitution. In 1820, an Indiana Supreme Court ruling in Polly v. Lasselle freed Polly Strong and provided a precedent for other enslaved people. An additional Supreme Court ruling in 1821 freed indentured servant Mary Bateman Clark, helping to bring an end to indentured servitude.

With the end of slavery in the state, Indiana became a border state with the southern slave states. Hoosiers like Levi Coffin came to play an important role in the Underground Railroad that helped many slaves escape from the South. Indiana remained anti-slavery and in the American Civil War remained with the Union and contributed men to the war.

== Early existence ==
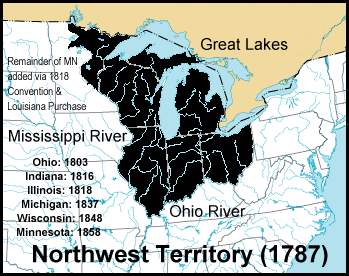
Northwest Territory (1787)

In 1783, at the end of the American Revolution, the territory that would become Indiana was annexed to the United States. Slavery was already a present institution: The French who had controlled the area only 20 years earlier, and their allies among the Native American population, had been practicing slavery in the region for at least one hundred and fifty years before the Americans took control. René-Robert Cavelier, Sieur de La Salle, first began explorations in Indiana in the late 1660s. He was accompanied by a Shawnee slave on several of his expeditions. In 1787, Congress organized the territory under the Northwest Ordinance, which prohibited slavery by stating "that there shall be neither slavery nor involuntary servitude in the said territory". It was later decided that anyone who purchased a slave outside of the territory could enter and reside there with their slaves. The Ordinance also allowed for preexisting French–Indian slave arrangements.

Many Virginian natives living in the territory interpreted the Ordinance as allowing them to have slaves. The Ordinance stated that the Virginians "shall have their possessions and titles confirmed to them, and be protected in the enjoyment of their rights and liberties." Many decided to keep slaves. Fear of French rebellion kept the courts from acting against slavery, as did the violent actions of those who would kidnap escaped slaves. A court ruling in the Michigan Territory in 1807 stated that preexisting slavery could still exist under the Northwest Ordinance, validating Hoosier slaveholding in the opinions of the slaveholders.

=== Southern influence ===
Many of the territory's early settlers came from the South. Southern immigrants who were anti-slavery settled in Ohio, where a strong anti-slavery movement was underway. The immigrants in favor of slavery generally moved to Indiana, where the government was friendly to slaveholders. When they relocated to the Indiana Territory, they brought what few slaves they owned with them. An 1810 census recorded 393 free blacks and 237 slaves in the Indiana Territory. Knox County, where the territorial capital of Indiana, Vincennes, was located, was the center of Indiana slavery. A young Army officer named Charles Larrabee, who was serving in Governor William Henry Harrison's army, summed the Vincennes populace as "chiefly from Kentucky and Virginia ... slavery is tolerated here."

Most of the initial immigration was attributed to the Revolutionary War and the War of 1812. After the Revolutionary War, George Rogers Clark and his soldiers, all Virginians, were given land grants in southern Indiana. Many settled in Indiana, bringing Southern habits and ideas with them. After the War of 1812, many veterans of the Western theater were granted land in central Indiana. These soldiers were mostly from Kentucky and the South. They also moved into Indiana, bringing more Southern influence to the state.

Southerners of all classes migrated to Indiana. William Henry Harrison, longtime Indiana Territory governor and future United States President, was from the long-established aristocratic class of the lowland and coastal South. His class supported slavery. From the non-slaveholding class of the Upland South were migrants such as Abraham Lincoln, whose family is representative of the migration to Indiana from Kentucky and Tennessee. Some of his social class, while not owning slaves, typically condoned the institution. Lincoln's father worked as a slave catcher and the family of Lincoln's wife, Mary Todd, owned slaves. But others immigrated to Indiana such as Levi Coffin, a North Carolina Quaker who was an outspoken abolitionist.

== Treatment of slaves ==
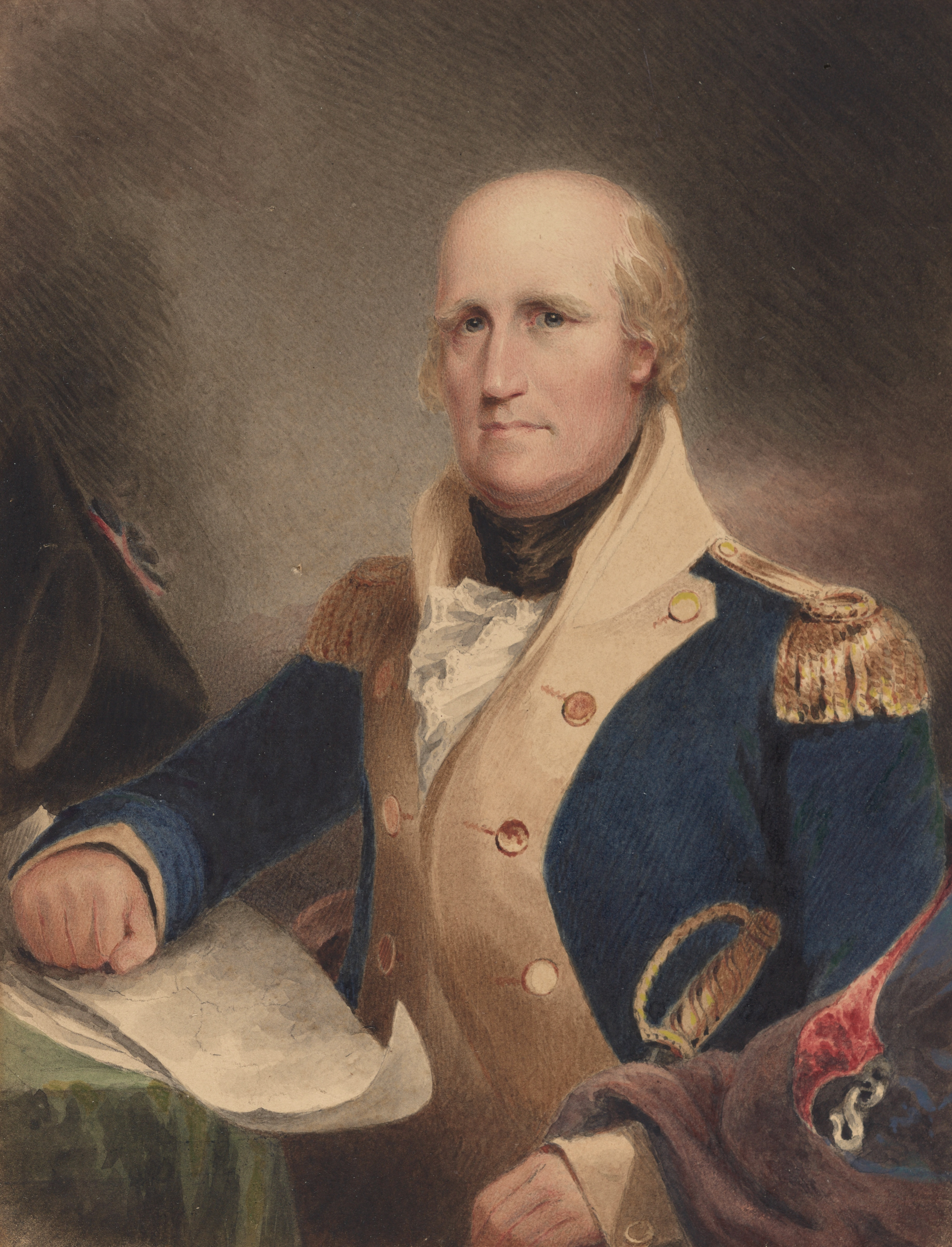
George Rogers Clark

The first recorded slaves in Indiana were owned by the French traders who entered the region and introduced the practice to the native tribes. Jesuit priests encouraged the tribes they lived among to adopt slavery as an alternative to executing their prisoners in war. According to some classical historians, the decline of cannibalism among the tribes was a direct result of the rise of slavery. Early slaves were often Native Americans who were sold to pay debts. The early slaves typically performed manual labor, helping the traders transport their goods and to build forts and trading posts. While part of new France, laws were enacted to give slaves some protection from their masters. Torture and mutilation of slaves was forbidden, and families were prevented from being forcibly broken up. Other laws allowed slaves to be seized by creditors as payment. Other laws required that if a master had children by a slave, the slave and her children were then to be freed. Their status under the French laws was similar to that of minors.

As the territory developed, their tasks changed; slaves also served as household servants and farm workers, as in the case of William Henry Harrison's slaves. George Rogers Clark's two slaves assisted him in running a gristmill in Clarksville. While the pro-slavery faction was in power, laws were passed permitting anyone to seize and return slaves who were more than ten miles from their home, and a one hundred dollar fine was placed on anyone who helped a slave escape. Some slaves, like "Aunt Fannie", who belonged to Dennis Pennington, refused to be set free. Pennington had freed all his slaves when he left Virginia, but Fannie did not want to be left behind and continued on as a free household servant for the rest of her life. She was buried in the Pennington family cemetery in Corydon, Indiana. Others were not so fortunate as in the case of another black woman who also lived in Corydon. When she tried to escape from her masters she was run down in the street, beaten, and carried back home. The men threatened death to anyone in the town, which was strongly anti-slavery, who interfered.

The slaves did not have a large impact on Indiana's economy as they never became a large percentage of the population and large scale plantation style farms, that were common in the southern states, never developed in Indiana. In 1820, the year all the state's slaves were freed, the census only counted 192 out of a population over 65,000. Many slaves had already been freed by that time and there over 1200 free blacks in the state during the same census.

== Indiana Territory ==
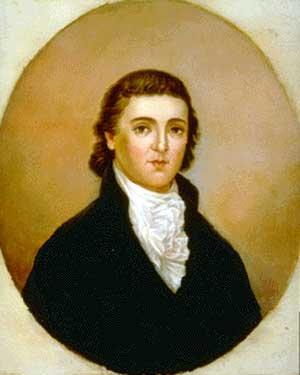
Thomas Posey

Slavery in the Indiana Territory was supported by Governors William Henry Harrison and his successor Thomas Posey, who both sought to legalize it in the territory. Both men were appointed by the President of the United States while the office was held by southern slaveholders. Although slavery was not legal under Article 6 of the Northwest Ordinance, Harrison recognized the existing customs of slavery and indenture in the territory, Both men's slavery positions were resisted by the territory's population. In a gesture to the residents who lived in the territory before the Northwest Ordinance, Harrison organized a public meeting in 1802 which called for a 10-year moratorium on the slavery ban. Harrison and Posey were strongly opposed by Jonathan Jennings, Dennis Pennington, and other prominent men who would eventually take over the territorial legislature.

Indiana courts never ruled on the Ordinance/slavery issue during the territorial period. When the issue of slavery was in the courts, it "was always treated as an existing institution and its legality went unchallenged." Early Hoosiers, including William Henry Harrison, wanted to have slavery legalized in the new territory. Harrison may have been motivated by the need to appease existing slaveowners, the need for labor in a developing territory, or the desire to attract immigrants from southern colonies. They sought passage of a new law to override the Northwest Ordinance's ban on slavery. Harrison succeeded in getting permission from Congress for the territory to decide for itself whether slavery should be legalized. Harrison and his party sought to gradually legalize slavery three times (1803, 1807, and 1809) but all three efforts ultimately failed. Harrison succeeded, however, in passing laws that established forms of indentured servitude.

Harrison was particularly interested in having slavery legalized. He maintained a plantation style home in Vincennes called Grouseland. Harrison was also in the process of constructing another plantation style farm called Harrison Valley near Corydon in 1807, the same year he was pushing for slavery to be legalized.

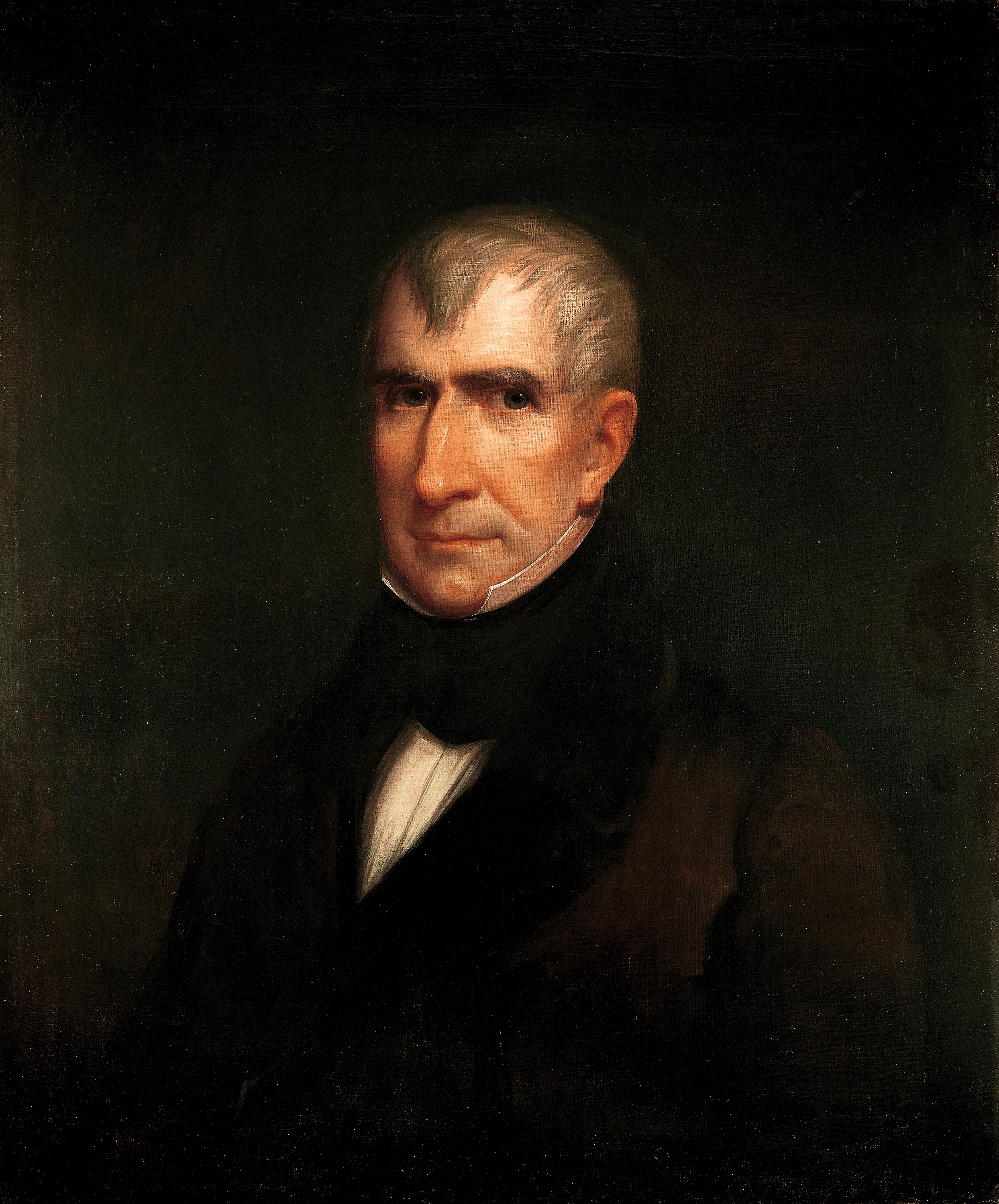
Governor, General and President William Henry Harrison

In 1803 Harrison asked Congress to suspend the anti-slavery clause of the Northwest Ordinance for ten years. Harrison claimed it was necessary to increase the territory's population more quickly and attract new settlers. Congress wanted the territory to become economically viable so that the federal government would no longer have to financially support it. In 1803 the entire territory's population numbered less than 5,000. That year the legislature—which was appointed by Harrison—passed legislation reintroducing indentured servitude.

In 1805 the Territory was granted representation in Congress. Pro-slavery Benjamin Parke was elected and supported Harrison's request to have Congress suspend the ban on slavery in the territory. Parke submitted legislation to outright legalize slavery, but no action was taken on it. The same year, Congress suspended Article Six of the Northwest Ordinance for ten years, and granted the territories covered by it the right to choose for themselves to legalize slavery. By the same act, Congress removed the legislative power from the General Court of the territory and created a Legislative Council that would was to be popularly elected. When the election was complete Davis Floyd was the only anti-slavery member elected; slavery had not yet become a major issue in the state. That year Harrison persuaded the legislature to begin the debate to legalize slavery. The bill was narrowly defeated because many of the slaveholders in the council wanted a concession from Harrison, namely to recommend creating the Illinois Territory, a concession which he refused to make.

=== Fight to end slavery ===
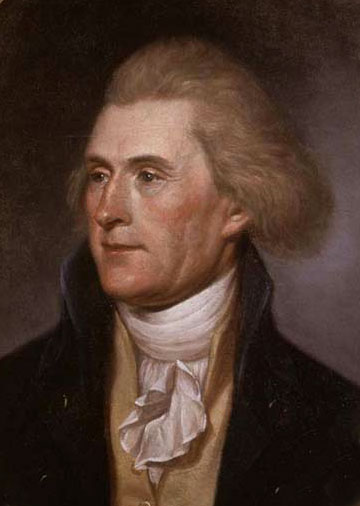
U.S. President Thomas Jefferson

Harrison's move to legalize slavery was not taken lightly by President Thomas Jefferson. Although Jefferson was himself a slaveholder, he was opposed to the spread of slavery. Jefferson had been working with James Lemen since at least 1784 and used him as an agent in the Northwest to organize an anti-slavery movement. Lemen succeeded in helping to establish an anti-slavery Baptist church that drew many members. Jefferson sent Lemen to the Indiana territory again in 1807 with the mission to seek out and organize the anti-slavery men of the state and encourage them to take action. Several prominent men had already been stirred by Harrison's moves to legalize slavery. Dennis Pennington, a former slave holder who had freed his slaves when he moved to Indiana, was chief among the anti-slavery men. Jonathan Jennings, who also attended the meeting, would quickly grow into the party's leader. Other prominent anti-slavery men included Richard Rue, John Paul, and General William Johnson, all veterans of the Revolution.

Later in 1807, at Lemen's urging, a mass meeting was held in Springville attended by many of the anti-slavery men within the state. The meeting was held largely in response to Harrison's attempt to legalize slavery and the fact that he almost succeeded, and likely would soon unless a large anti-slavery faction came to power. The meeting was chaired by John Beggs, with Davis Floyd acting as secretary. Dennis Pennington and others put forth speeches, and resolved to stop the attempt to legalize slavery. They declared their intentions to end the "despised institution". Their resolution stated:

... a great number of citizens, in various parts of the United States, are preparing, and many have actually emigrated to this Territory, to get free from a Government which does tolerate slavery ... And although it is contended by some, that, at this day, there is a great majority in favor of slavery, whilst the opposite opinion is held by others, the fact is certainly doubtful. But when we take into consideration the vast emigration into this Territory, and of citizens, too, decidedly opposed to the measure, we feel satisfied that, at all events, Congress will suspend any legislative act on this subject until we shall, by the constitution, be admitted into the Union, and have a right to adopt such a constitution, in this respect, as may comport with the wishes of a majority of the citizens. ... The toleration of slavery is either right or wrong; and if Congress should think, with us, that it is wrong, that it is inconsistent with the principles upon which our future constitution is to be formed, your memorialists will rest satisfied that, at least, this subject will not be by them taken up until the constitutional number of the citizens of this Territory shall assume that right.

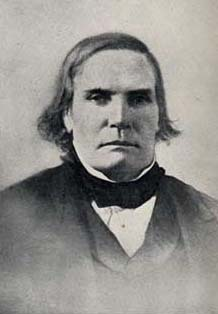
Jesse B. Thomas

When the petition was signed and circulated, it gained six hundred more signatures than the petition circulated to request the legalization of slavery. The same year, the abolitionists won their first victory over the Harrison faction. In the election for territorial delegate, Jesse B. Thomas, the anti-slavery factions candidate, defeated Harrison's candidate.

By 1809 the territory's population had climbed to over 20,000. Congress passed legislation that allowed the Indiana Territory to elect a bicameral legislature and made the Legislative Council the upper house It also ordered Harrison to dissolve the existing one and created the Illinois Territory. The effect of these actions, was to cut the pro-slavery faction remaining in the Indiana Territory in half. The election resulted in a sweeping victory for the anti-slavery party. The new assembly quickly passed legislation revoking the indentured servitude laws of 1803, and introduced legislation to prevent its reintroduction. They also passed laws aimed at preventing slave hunters from removing escaped slaves from the state.

The repeal of the laws was met with resentment and violence in Vincennes. An effigy of Jesse Bright was burnt in the street, and Rice Jones, an opponent of Harrison, was murdered.

=== Abolitionist victory ===
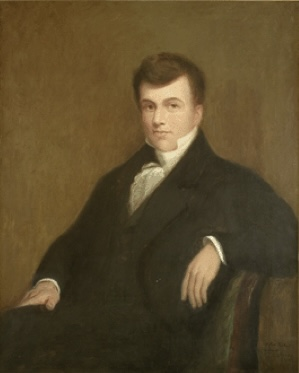
Governor and Congressman Jonathan Jennings

In 1809, Dennis Pennington, one of the most outspoken anti-slavery men and a friend of Henry Clay, was elected to the legislature as the representative from Harrison County, and became speaker of the assembly. His prominence allowed him to dominate the legislature. Before the constitutional convention in 1816, Pennington was quoted as saying "Let us be on our guard when our convention men are chosen that they be men opposed to slavery." At the constitutional convention, the anti-slavery party was able to take control, electing Jennings as the president of the convention. It was by their actions that slavery was banned by the first constitution.

When Indiana sought statehood in 1816, there was talk of its entering as a slave state among the dwindling group of slavery supporters as illustrated in the March 2, 1816 edition of the (Vincennes) Western Sun, where a "citizen of Gibson" stated, "the best interests of humanity required the admission of slavery into the state." The eastern half of the state saw much debate over the slavery issue. While the state constitution did outlaw slavery and indentures, much of the population that had immigrated from the South were commoners and not landed slaveholders. Of the 43 men who wrote the constitution, 34 were either born or had once lived in the South, and the constitution was a near copy of the Kentucky constitution, save for the anti-slavery clause.

During the first gubernatorial election, Jonathan Jennings's campaign motto was "No Slavery in Indiana". He easily defeated pro-slavery candidate Thomas Posey, and upon his victory he declared that Indiana was a "Free State". He also asked the legislature to pass laws that would stop the "unlawful attempts to seize and carry into bondage persons of color legally entitled to their freedom: and at the same time, as far as practical, to prevent those who rightfully owe service to the citizen of any other State of Territory, from seeking, within the limits of this State (Indiana), a refuge from the possession of their lawful masters." He stated that such laws would help secure the freedom of many. This request resulted in the creation of a Man Stealing Act aimed to prevent slave hunters from operating in the state.

In 1818 Dennis Pennington, then a state senator, had three Kentuckians indicted for violating the Man Stealing Act when they forcibly took a black woman from a home in Harrison County and removed her to Kentucky. Governor Jennings requested the Kentucky Governor send the men to Indiana for trials; after several years of correspondence the Kentucky governor refused on constitutional grounds. These events led Jennings to eventually have to reverse his position and request that the legislature pass laws to discourage runaway slaves from seeking refuge in Indiana. Jennings said it was needed to "maintain harmony between the states".

From 1810 to 1820, the number of free blacks in Indiana increased from 400 to 1200. The largest influx in occurred in 1814 when Paul and Susannah Mitchem immigrated to Indiana from Virginia with over 100 of their slaves. They subsequently emancipated all of their slaves later that year, most of whom formed a large part of the population of the first state capital in Corydon. In 1820 the State Supreme Court case of Polly v. Lasselle ordered all slaves, except those held before the 1787 Northwest Territory Ordinance, to be freed. The new ruling led to a sharp decline in the state's slave population. In 1820 the census recorded 190 slaves; by the 1830 census there were only three.

In 1823, when Ohio passed resolutions asking the Federal government for a national ban on slavery, at the urging of Governor William Hendricks, the Indiana General Assembly issued a resolution which was forwarded the Federal government stating:

Resolved, That it is expedient that such a system should be predicated upon the principle that the evil of slavery is a national one and that the people and the States of this Union ought mutually to participate in the duties and burdens of removing it Therefore,

Resolved, By the General Assembly of the State of Indiana that we do approve of and cordially concur in the aforesaid resolutions of the State of Ohio and that His Excellency the Governor be requested to communicate the same to the Executives of each of the several States in the Union and each of our Senators and Representatives in Congress requesting their cooperation in all national measures to effect the grand object therein embraced.

== Indiana state ==
=== Remnants of slavery ===
Year	Slaves	Free Blacks
1800	28	87
1810	237	393
1820	192	1,230
1830	3	3,629
1840	3	7,165
1850	0	11,262

Even with statehood, there was still slavery in Indiana. Despite slavery and indentures becoming illegal in 1816 due to the state constitution, the 1820 federal census listed 190 slaves in Indiana. Many Hoosier slaveholders felt that the 1816 constitution did not cover preexisting slavery; others just did not care if it was illegal. In eastern Indiana nearly all slaveholders immediately freed their slaves. But the majority of slaveholders in western counties, especially in Knox, decided to keep their slaves. The Vincennes newspaper Western Sun had numerous times advertised "indentured Negroes and other slaves", a sign of the approval of slavery in the area. "In Knox County, virtually all of the (slave) suits were denied by the County Court in 1817 and 1818." A black woman known as Polly was held slave by French trader Hyacinthe Lasselle of Vincennes. Polly sued in 1820 for her freedom, but was denied in the Knox County Court. She appealed to the Indiana Supreme Court, who ruled in her favor that she should be free. But even after this decision, there was slavery in Indiana. The federal census of 1830 still showed three slaves in Indiana: one each in Orange County, Decatur County, and Warrick County. A separate local census in Knox County in 1830 showed the presence of 32 slaves. Even in 1840 there were three slaves listed in the federal census as being in Indiana: a girl in Putnam County and a man and girl in Rush County.

=== Views upon slavery ===
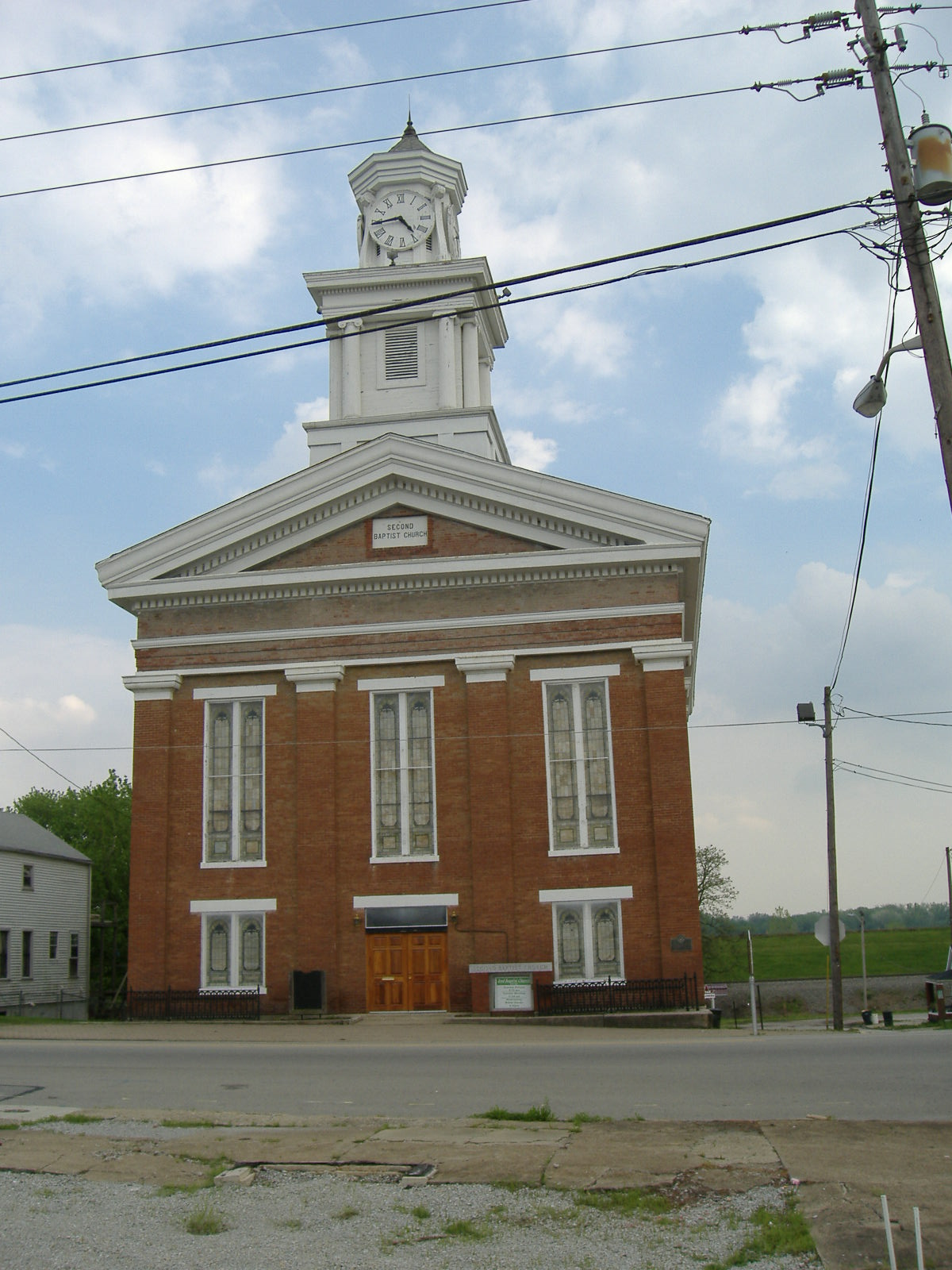
Town Clock Church in New Albany was used in the Underground Railroad.

A traveler from New York, Dr. Samuel Bernard Judah, described Vincennes in 1829 as having many blacks, making the observation of them being "generally poorly clad ... poor miserable race". Indiana Governor Noah Noble spoke with pride in December 1837 on how Indiana helped slaveholders recapture their escaped slaves. When Kentucky expressed displeasure at how some Hoosiers helped runaways, the Indiana legislature passed a resolution that stated acts by Northerners to interfere with the capture of runaways was "unpatriotic and injurious to the stability of the Union."

In 1851 Indiana adopted a new constitution, and among its new clauses was one that prohibited blacks from immigrating to Indiana. The prohibition was intended to be a punishment to the slavery states. Like several other northern states, Indiana lawmakers believed the majority of free blacks were uneducated and ill-equipped to care for themselves. They believed since the South put them in that condition, they should be responsible for the "burden" of caring for them. This view, that the South should clean up its own mess, remained dominant even after the Civil War, and the clause in Indiana's constitution was not repealed until the 20th century.

=== Abraham Lincoln ===
Abraham Lincoln lived in Indiana from 1816 until 1830, age 7 to 21. It was during his late teen years that Lincoln first traveled by flatboat to New Orleans; during the trip and in New Orleans proper, he first encountered slavery and began to form his opinions. Growing up in a climate where the state politics were run by men like Jennings and Pennington would have much influence on the development of Lincoln's views.

=== Underground Railroad ===
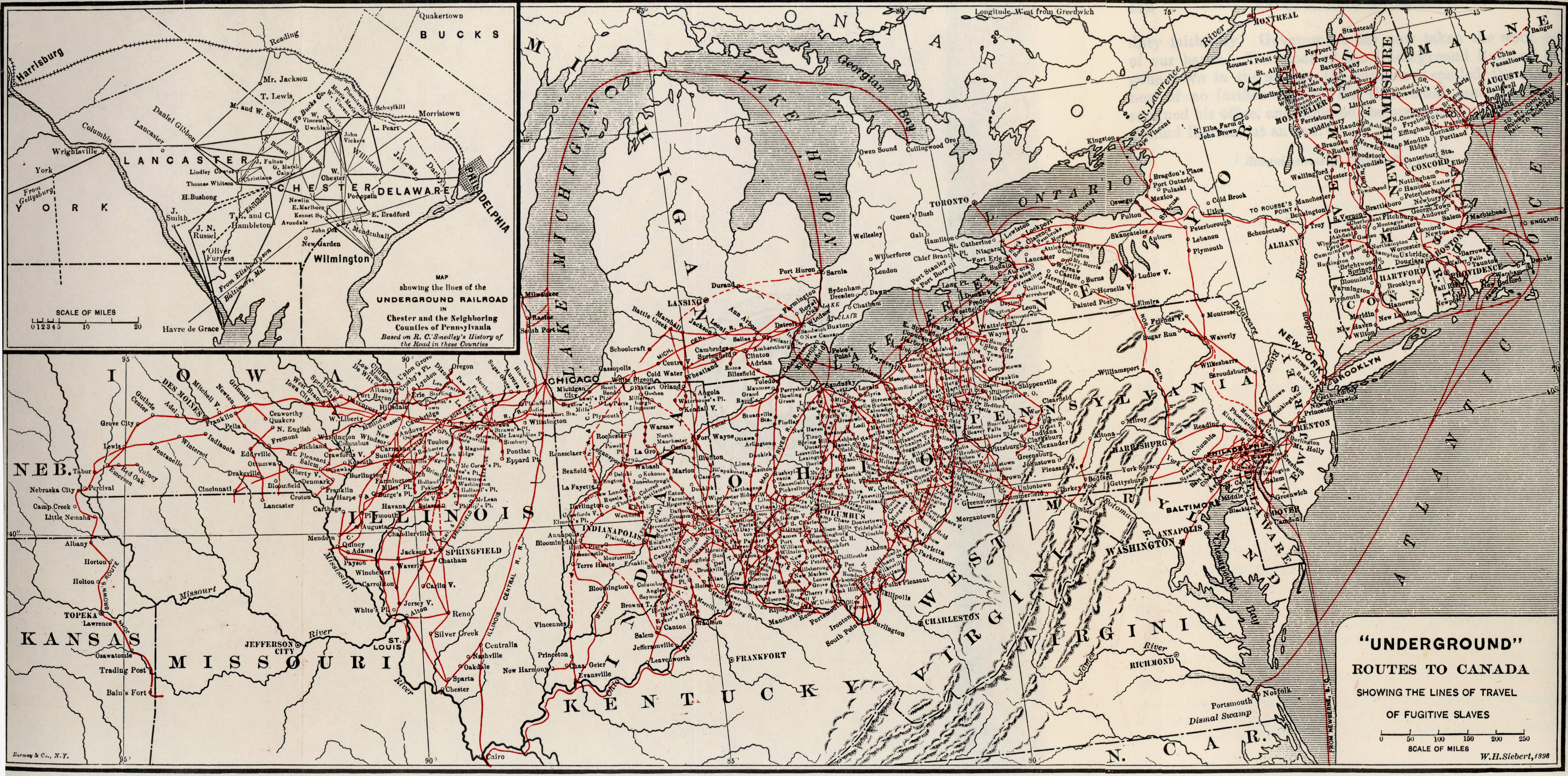
Map of the Underground Railroad from 1830 to 1865 including escape routes that went through Indiana

Many Indiana residents participated in the Underground Railroad. Two major arteries in the underground railroad traveled through Indiana. Tell City, Evansville, and Jeffersonville were gateways to the underground railroad. An important stopover was Westfield, where food and hiding places were provided to slaves trying to reach Canada. Other safe houses dotted Indiana, including one in Town Clock Church (pictured). Escaping slaves who entered Indiana would be ferried from safe house to safe house northward, usually into Michigan, where they could cross safely to Windsor, in Ontario, Canada.

In one of the more famous events of the underground railroad, Eliza Harris, a slave from Kentucky, crossed the Ohio River one winter's night when it froze over. She was aided in her escape by Levi Coffin of Fountain City, and eventually escaped to Ontario after being guided by Hoosiers from safe house to safe house through Indiana. Her story was the inspiration for the book Uncle Tom's Cabin. Coffin and his wife would help as many as two thousand slaves escape the South.

== See also ==
- History of Indiana
- Dennis Pennington
- Jonathan Jennings
- William Henry Harrison
