= Polly Strong =

Enslaved woman in the US Northwest Territory (c. 1796–unknown)

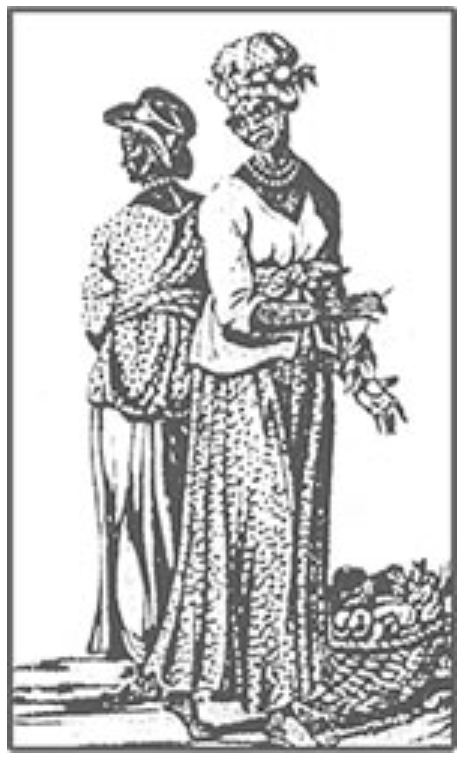
- Drawing of Polly Strong, who sued for her freedom in 1820, Indiana
- Born: ca. 1796; Northwest Territory
- Died: Unknown
- Known for: State v. Lasselle, Supreme Court of Indiana freedom suit case

Polly Strong (c. 1796–unknown) was an enslaved woman in the Northwest Territory, in present-day Indiana. She was born after the Northwest Ordinance prohibited slavery. Slavery was prohibited by the Constitution of Indiana in 1816. Two years later, Strong's mother Jenny and attorney Moses Tabbs asked for a writ of habeas corpus for Polly and her brother James in 1818. Judge Thomas H. Blake produced indentures, Polly for 12 more years and James for four more years of servitude. The case was dismissed in 1819.

In 1819, attorneys John W. Osborn and Amory Kinney, sought to test the legality of slave arrangements made prior to 1816. They sued for Strong's freedom at the Knox County Circuit Court in Polly v. Lasselle in 1820, but the court ruled that she was to remain enslaved. The case was appealed to the Indiana Supreme Court in State v. Lasselle. Based upon the 1816 Constitution of Indiana, the justices ruled that "slavery can have no existence" in Indiana. Strong was freed. Other enslaved people were not automatically freed, but there was a precedent that others could use in the courts. In 1821, the Mary Clark v. G.W. Johnston case was tried in the Indiana Supreme Court, which ruled that indentured servitude was no longer legal in Indiana. The number of enslaved people reduced over the next couple of decades. There were three slaves in the state in both the 1830 and 1840 censuses.

== Background ==
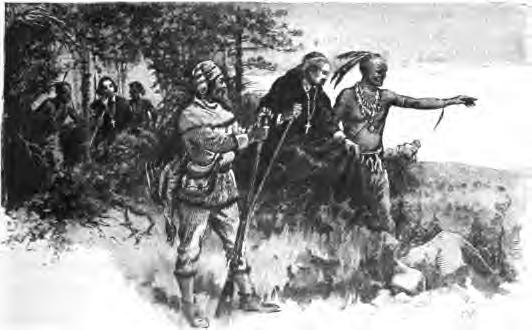
Native Americans guiding French Explorers through Indiana, Stories of Indiana, by Maurice Thompson

By 1746, African and Native American enslaved people were owned by Catholic priests and French traders, and the practice continued during the period when Great Britain controlled the area that is Indiana. The frontier north and west of the Ohio River became the Northwest Territory in 1787. Article VI of the Northwest Ordinance prohibited slavery and involuntary servitude. Many slaveholders took this to mean that the ordinance excluded people who already owned slaves. (Note: President of the Congress Arthur St. Clair (and later governor) told residents that the provision did not free enslaved people who lived in the territory before 1847. The first territorial judge, George Turner disagreed with St. Clair and issued an order granting freedom to slaves of Judge Henry Vanderburgh, Peter and Queen McNelly.)

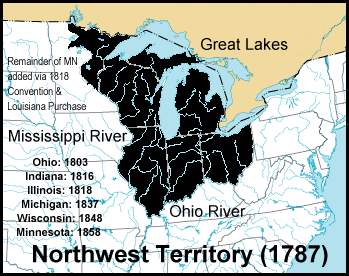
Map of the Northwest Territory as of 1787, with years of statehood

In 1800, the Indiana Territory was formed. Many slaveholders immigrated to the territory bringing their slaves with them. The territory passed legislation that allowed for the slaves to be indentured within the territory. This law allowed slaveholders to continue in their ownership of slaves that were purchased outside of the state, even if the slaves came to reside in Indiana.

Slavery and involuntary servitude were prohibited by the 1816 Indiana Constitution. This ban brought the previous laws that had permitted slavery into conflict, and the issues of whether preexisting slave arrangements were still legal was brought before the courts on several occasions. Each time the circuit courts had denied or approved the freedom of the slaves on an individual basis. Black people continued to remain enslaved or indentured servants after 1816. There were 190 slaves in Indiana in 1820, 118 of them in Knox County, Indiana.

In his article "Almost a Free State", historian Paul Finkelman enumerated three ways for enslaved people in Indiana to become free. They could run away, they could hire attorneys to file freedom suits in the court, or their owners could decide to give them their freedom.

== Early life ==
Around 1796, Polly Strong was born in the Northwest Territory to an enslaved woman, Jenny, who was owned by Antoine Lasselle who lived near Fort Wayne. Her father was someone with the surname of Strong. Prior to Strong's birth, Jenny, had been kidnapped by Native Americans. She was sold to Antoine Lasselle after the Treaty of Greenville (1795). Strong's brother, James, was born around 1800. They were separated when Strong was sold to Joseph Barron. James was later sold to someone with the surname of LaPlante. (Note: Jean LaPlant was a slaveholder at the time.) At around the age of ten, Strong was purchased by Hyacinthe Lasselle, an innkeeper and trader from Vincennes, in what was then Indiana Territory (1800–1816). Lasselle later purchased James.

Strong was baptized on April 11, 1819, with the name Marguerite at St. Francis Xavier Catholic Church in Vincennes. At the time, she was identified as a mixed-race woman. She may not have been treated well by Lasselle. Strong was described as pretty with a "bright disposition" and "pleasing manners".

Strong and her brother were threatened by Lasselle and imprisoned after the writ of habeas corpus was filed. She sought asylum and was taken in by Joseph Huffman, an African American barber, on January 9, 1820. A grand jury indicted Huffman for "harboring a servant girl" on February 10. Huffman paid for a $200 (equivalent to $4,607 in 2025) appeal bond for her release from Lasselle.

== The Lasselles ==
The Lasselles were among the oldest family of immigrants in the state and had been in the region since France had owned it in the 18th century. (Note: Hyacinthe Lasselle's father was Jacques Lasselle, a French-Canadian trader from Montreal. Jacques traded with Native Americans at Detroit, Kekionga, and Fort Wayne. Around 1765, Jacques married a Miami woman. He had four sons, including Hyacinthe (1777–1843), who also became traders. Antoine Lasselle was Lasselle's uncle.) Hyacinthe Lasselle settled in Vincennes in 1804, where he was appointed to legislative and civic positions. He operated an inn, a bar, and a distillery and fought during the War of 1812. Vincennes had been an early outpost for the French, who bought slaves to tend to their "creature comforts". Lasselle purchased his slaves from Native Americans, and when the state constitution was enacted, he made a show of freeing his slaves, but they were not really freed.

== Court cases ==
=== Writ of habeas corpus ===
Although slavery was prohibited by the Indiana Constitution of 1816, Strong remained enslaved. Moses Tabbs, an attorney who worked with her mother Jenny, asked the Knox County Circuit Court for a writ of habeas corpus for Jenny, Strong (22) and her brother James (15) on July 15, 1818. Lasselle was forced to court to show why Jenny's two children should remain enslaved. On August 4, 1818, Judge Thomas H. Blake met in his chambers with Laselle, Strong, and James. He produced indentures, Strong for 12 more years and James for four more years of servitude. Before a local justice of the peace, Strong and James acknowledged that their indentures to Lasselle were voluntary. During this time, Strong and James were threatened by Lasselle and imprisoned when the indentures were signed. The case of James and Polly vs. Laselle was dismissed without prejudice in May 1819. James no longer appeared in habeas corpus cases after that.

=== Polly v. Lasselle ===
In 1819, two abolitionists, John W. Osborn and Amory Kinney, sought the aid of a Vincennes law office to test the legality of slave arrangements made prior to 1816. The two were Canadians who had immigrated to Indiana after the War of 1812. They believed that the constitutional ban on slavery extended to all slaves, including those held before 1816. The lawyers at the office, Colonel George McDonald and Moses Tabbs, also members of the anti-slavery party, began to prepare a test case to bring before the courts. Strong had been purchased before the Northwest Territory had been established, and if she could be freed then a precedent would be set whereby all other slaves in the state could also be set free. Her case had been combined with a similarly situated enslaved man, Francis Jackson, who was owned by Francoise Tisdale.

On January 27, 1820, attorney Amory Kinney filed a freedom suit on her behalf with the Knox County Circuit Court. Lassalle's defense attorney was Judge Jacob Call, a future Congressman.

The circuit court in Vincennes ruled that Strong should remain a slave in part because Polly's mother was a slave before the Northwest Ordinance of 1787 was passed, so they found that her mother remained a slave. Slaveholders in slave states automatically owned any of their enslaved women's children under partus sequitur ventrem and the judges ruled that doctrine should apply to this case as well.

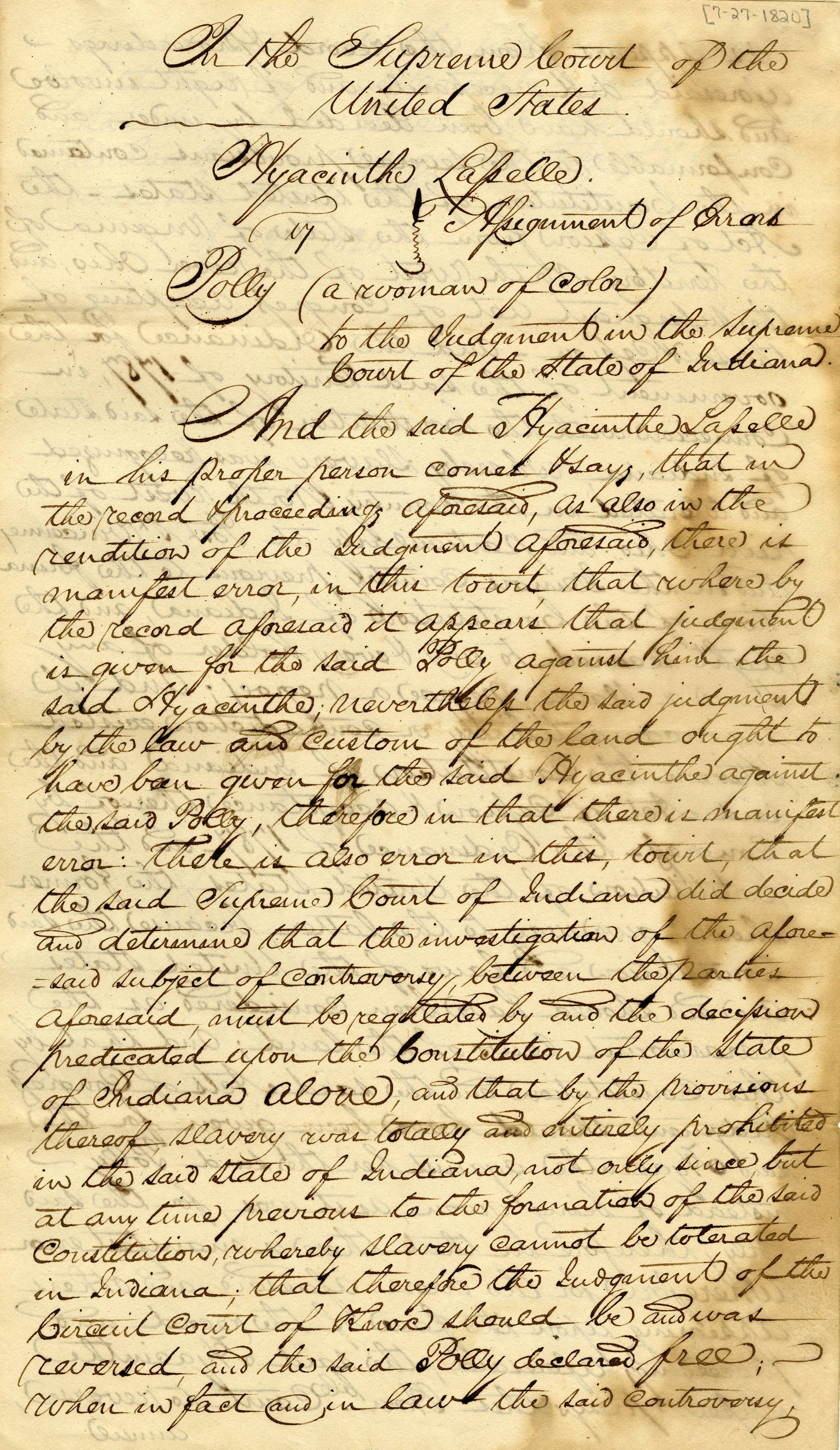
July 27th,1820 Assignment of errors to the U.S. Supreme Court

=== State v. Lasselle ===
The appeal was filed by Kinney to the Indiana Supreme Court in Corydon, Indiana on May 12, 1820. Representing Strong were Amory Kinney, Col. George McDonald, and Moses Tabbs. John W. Osborn, Kinney's law partner, was also involved in the case. In June 1820, the case was appealed to the Indiana Supreme Court. Chief Justice Isaac Blackford was the son-in-law of McDonald, one of the plaintiff's lawyers. The plaintiff's lawyers argued that the constitution superseded all other laws, including one written prior to the constitution's adoption, and that the Northwest Ordinance ceased to apply to Indiana after statehood. The defense argued that the Northwest Ordinance, a federal law, superseded the state constitution and that it could have been repealed only by the federal government but was not repealed, it was still in effect regardless of Indiana's status in the Union.

The ruling was made on July 22, 1820, based upon the Indiana Constitution, 11th article, section 7,

There shall be neither slavery nor involuntary servitude in this state, otherwise than for the punishment of crimes, whereof the party shall have been duly convicted. Nor shall any indenture of any negro or mulatto hereafter made, and executed out of the bounds of this state be of any validity within the state."

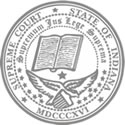
Seal of the Indiana Supreme Court

Justice James Scott wrote, "It is evident that by these provisions, the framers of our constitution intended a total and entire prohibition of slavery in this State; and we can conceive of no form of words in which that intention could have been more clearly expressed." Strong was declared a free woman.

Lasselle filed an appeal with the Supreme Court of the United States on July 27, 1820. The court refused to hear the case, upholding the decision made by the Indiana Supreme Court.

=== Decision repercussions ===
The decision was a major victory for the abolitionists in the state who had organized to ban slavery only seventeen years earlier. Strong was free, but the decision did not free other enslaved people. However, it made the Indiana Constitution the authority for decisions regarding slavery and involuntary servitude in Indiana courts.

There was some anger among the slaveholding community and violence was threatened against Osborn and Kinney, but no action was taken against them. The case also led to the impeachment of the Clark County Justice of the Peace for aiding slaveholders who refused to free their slaves. Many slaveholders, not wanting to lose their valuable slaves, left the state before their slaves could be taken from them.

The 1820 US census revealed that there were 190 slaves in Indiana and 1,200 free blacks. The number of slaves dropped off dramatically and there were only three slaves in the state in both the 1830 and 1840 censuses.

In 1821, Kinney filed a suit to free an indentured servant, Mary Bateman Clark. As with Strong's case, Clark lost in the Circuit Court, but appealed the decision with the Indiana Supreme Court, where they won. This was a landmark case for indentured servants and foretold the end of bondservants in Indiana.

== Later life ==
On March 2, 1822, Joseph Huffman sued Strong to collect money that he lent her. Strong was arrested, and bail was set and paid six days later. Strong denied the charges, but the jury found in favor of Huffman and awarded him $35 in damages.

One report is that Strong moved to St. Louis, Missouri and later traveled to Indiana where she visited members of the Lasselle family. In a June 17, 1825 letter to Lasselle, her brother James promised to deliver Strong's bureau when requested. This is the last known direct reference to Strong. In the 1830 U.S. Federal Census, there is a woman of her age in residence with Lasselle. In 1833, Lasselle moved to Logansport, Indiana, where he died in 1843.

== Legacy ==
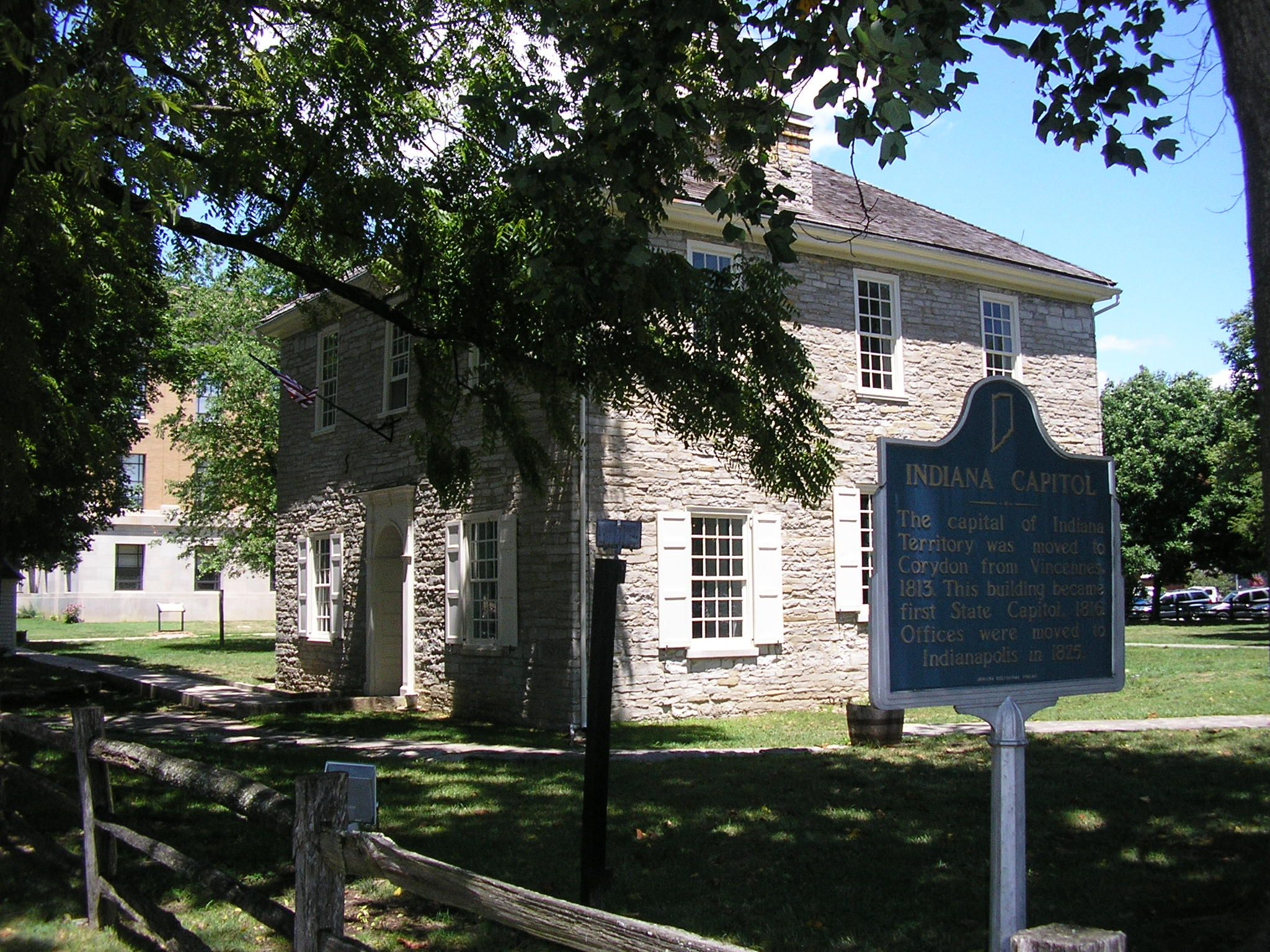
First State Capitol building in downtown Corydon, Indiana

A historical marker commemorating Polly Strong is located in front of the Harrison County Courthouse and the First State Capitol building in Corydon, Indiana.

== See also ==
- History of slavery in Indiana
- Indiana Supreme Court
- American slave court cases

== Bibliography ==
- Dunn, Jacob Piatt (1919). Indiana and Indianans. American Historical Society.'
