= James F. Gookins =

U.S. artist and soldier (1840–1904)

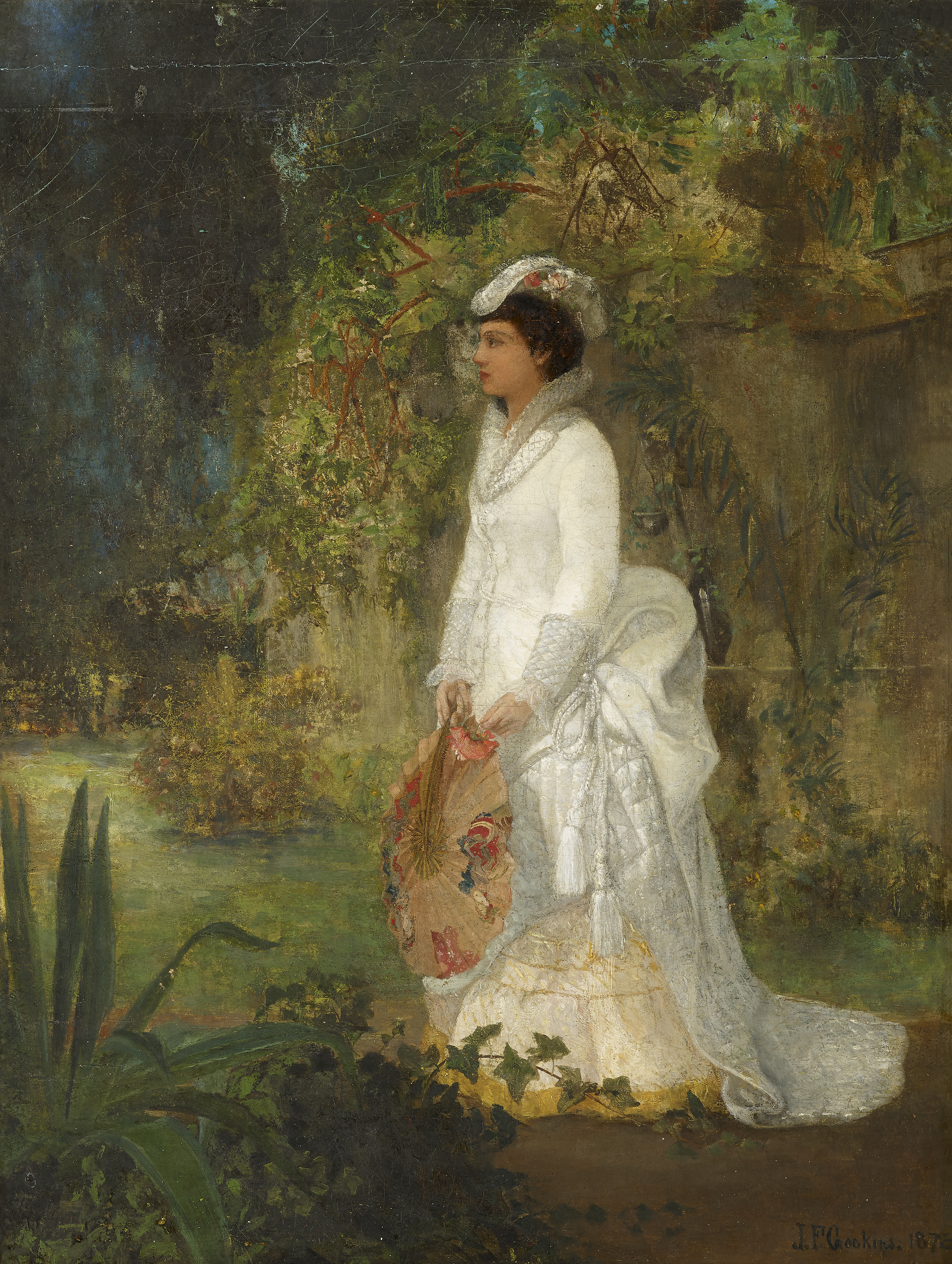
James Farrington Gookins, Portrait of the Artist's Wife, Indianapolis Museum of Art

James Farrington Gookins (December 30, 1840 – May 23, 1904) was an American artist. He was born in Terre Haute, Indiana, where his father, Samuel Gookins, was a lawyer and judge. He attended Wabash College but his education was interrupted by the outbreak of the American Civil War. He joined the 11th Indiana Volunteers under Lew Wallace. During his war service he produced several sketches that were published in Harper's Weekly.

After the war he moved to Chicago to pursue art, moved to Europe for a time to study, and then returned to the United States and opened an art school in Indianapolis. Later in life he was involved in organizing the Indiana Soldiers and Sailors' Monument, "designed the lakefront plans for the 1893 Colombian Exposition," and worked as a civil engineer. He died of a "stroke of apoplexy" in New York City.
