= Mary Bateman Clark =

American woman who resisted slavery (1795–1840)

- Born: c. 1795; Kentucky
- Died: 1840
- Resting place: Greenlawn Cemetery, Vicennes, Indiana
- Known for: Indiana Supreme Court case of 1821 that freed her and set the precedent for other indentured servants
- Spouse: Samuel Clark
- Children: 12 children

Mary Bateman Clark (1795–1840) was an American woman, born into slavery, who was taken to Indiana Territory. She was forced to become an indentured servant, even though the Northwest Ordinance prohibited slavery. She was sold in 1816, the same year that the Constitution of Indiana prohibited slavery and indentured servitude. In 1821, attorney Amory Kinney represented her as she fought for her freedom in the courts. After losing the case in the Circuit Court, she appealed to the Indiana Supreme Court in the case of Mary Clark v. G.W. Johnston. She won her freedom with the precedent-setting decision against indentured servitude in Indiana. The documentary, Mary Bateman Clark: A Woman of Colour and Courage, tells the story of her life and fight for freedom.

== Background ==
Beginning in the 16th century, the present-day state of Indiana was part of New France (1534–1763), under which slavery was legal. Slavery was practiced by the French, Native Americans, and their allies. For instance, René-Robert Cavelier, Sieur de La Salle traveled through the area with a Shawnee slave. Native American and Black enslaved people were bought and sold in slave markets in New Orleans and Canada. (Note: In the early 1800s, Knox County was wilderness (Northwest Territory (1797) and then Indiana Territory (1809)). Many of the French and English Americans who lived there before the 19th century had lived in and then abandoned their simple homes. Travel was conducted along dirt paths. After the Revolutionary War, former soldiers settled in the county.)

Those who were pro-slavery tried to perform an end run around the Indiana constitution by putting in place indentured servitude under which slaves, in theory, appeared to be able earn their freedom. However, the terms often placed on indentured servants were so excessive, many never actually never were able to achieve freedom.

— Rebecca R. Bibbs, It took two Supreme Court cases to end slavery in Indiana

Even though the Northwest Ordinance of 1787 banned slavery, most of the African Americans were enslaved, some were indentured servants. Many of the slaveholders were influential men like civic and religious leaders, businessmen, and lawyers, who sanctioned going around the law to keep their bondservants. Slaveholders created a "loophole", that the provision did not apply to African Americans who were already enslaved in the state. In 1816, the Constitution of Indiana made forced labor illegal, stating that "there shall be neither slavery nor involuntary servitude in this state."

Polly Strong, an enslaved woman, was the plaintiff in a case that argued that she should be free. After losing in the Harrison County Circuit Court, she won the case at the Indiana Supreme Court on July 22, 1820, and she was freed.

== Early life ==
External image
- Rendering of Mary Bateman Clark

Mary Bateman Clark was born into slavery in 1795. (Note: Johnson states that she was born in 1801.) She was a teenager living in Kentucky in 1814, when she was sold to Benjamin J. Harrison, who took her north January of the following year to Vincennes in Indiana Territory. (Note: Harrison was related to the first governor of Indiana Territory, William Henry Harrison, who later became the president of the United States.) Harrison forced Clark to sign an agreement, that she could not read, that required her to remain his servant for 30 years. Blacks were threatened that if they did not sign indenture contracts, they would be returned to slavery in the South.

Even though the Constitution of Indiana of 1816 prohibited slavery and servitude, Harrison sold Clark to General Washington Johnston, his wealthy uncle and member of the Indiana General Assembly. He was a recent widower. On October 24, 1816, she was purchased for $350 (equivalent to $6,640 in 2025) and had an indenture contract of 20 years. (Note: Don L. Williams stated that she was purchased for $300.)

== Court cases ==
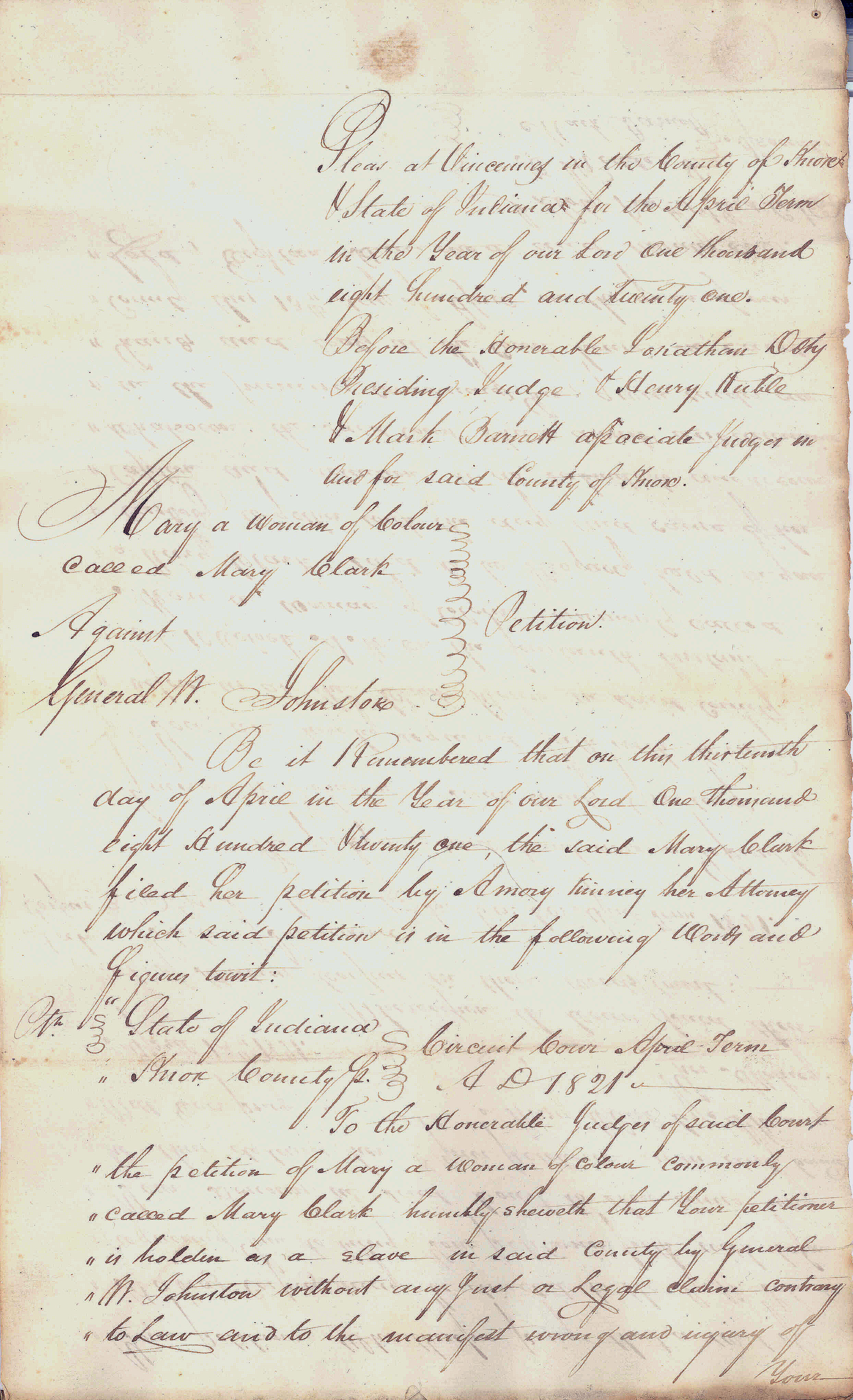
Petition for Clark's freedom filed in Knox Circuit Court, Vincennes, Indiana

Mary, a woman of color, called Mary Clark v. General W. Johnston, 1821, Knox County, Indiana Circuit Court]]

In 1821, Attorney Amory Kinney, who one year earlier represented Polly Strong, filed the freedom suit Mary Clark v. General W. Johnston to terminate Clark's indenture. As with Strong's case, Clark lost in the Circuit Court. The court had ruled that she voluntarily entered into indentured contract, and had to finish out the 20-year term. Clark was ordered to pay Johnston's court costs.

Clark's attorney appealed the decision with the Indiana Supreme Court in the case of Mary Clark v. G.W. Johnston. She won her freedom on November 6, 1821, when the court ruled that servitude violated the state's 1816 Constitution. This was a landmark contract law case for indentured servants and foretold the end of forced labor in Indiana. At some point, Samuel was also freed.

After the Indiana Supreme Court verdicts, Kinney was attacked by mobs, and after a few years moved to Terre Haute, Indiana.

== Personal life ==
Mary Bateman married Samuel Clark on July 12, 1817, becoming Mary Bateman Clark. Samuel Clark had also come from Kentucky as an enslaved person. (Note: In 1890, William H. Stewart wrote a romantic version of Mary and Samuel's arrival in Indiana. Stewart said that Samuel Clark came to Vincennes first and went back to Kentucky to bring Mary to the area.) He was William Henry Harrison's horse handler at the Battle of Tippecanoe. He may have been owned by Luke Decker of Knox County. The Clarks had twelve children together. The seven known children were born between 1820 and 1837: Mary Eliza Brewer, George, William G. W., Frances, John S., Lovina Mariah Reynolds, and Maria Rollins. The family lived in Vincennes. Bateman Clark was a co-founder of the Bethel AME Church of Vincennes. She died in 1840 of dysentery after drinking poisoned water and was buried in the Greenlawn Cemetery in Vincennes. Samuel death was reported on October 27, 1869.

== Legacy ==
External image
- Mary Clark historical marker, Knox County Courthouse

- Outside the Knox County Court House in Vincennes, Indiana, a historical marker commemorates Clark and her landmark Supreme Court case. It was installed on June 27, 2009. Although Vincennes was the first black community in the state, the marker is the only state memorial in the town.
- Ethel McCane and Eunice Trotter, Clark's three times great-granddaughters perform reenactments of the case in Indiana.
- The documentary, Mary Bateman Clark: A Woman of Colour and Courage, tells the story of her life and fight for freedom. Produced by the Agency for Instructional Technology, it was televised on local PBS affiliates during Black History Month.
