= James Lemen =

James Lemen Sr. (November 10, 1760 – January 8, 1823) was an American church founder and an influential leader of the anti-slavery movement in Indiana Territory in the early nineteenth century.

== Biography ==
Born near Harper's Ferry, Virginia (now in West Virginia) or in Lexington, Virginia, in colonial times. He served a two-year enlistment in the American Revolutionary War. He graduated from Washington and Lee University in 1776. He married Catherine Ogle, from the family whose name is perpetuated in that of Ogle County, Illinois.

Lemen was a leader of the anti-slavery movement in Indiana Territory, and influenced the Illinois' first "Free State" Constitution, which was framed in 1818 and preserved in 1824.

He and his family moved to Illinois in the spring of 1786 by way the Ohio River. He founded the town of New Design the same year (near present-day Waterloo in Monroe County). He was one of the founders of the first Baptist church in Illinois.

He died in New Design, Illinois on January 8, 1823, at the age of 62.

In an alleged letter to Lemen's son, dated March 2, 1857, Abraham Lincoln praises Lemen senior's anti-slavery work. Lemen, as Jefferson's agent in Illinois, founded the anti-slavery churches, which in Lincoln's view, "set in motion the forces which finally made Illinois a free state." In Appendix II of "The Collected Works of Abraham Lincoln" this letter is listed as a forgery. It is unclear why such a letter would be forged, as Lemen was an established and influential leader in the anti-slavery movement.

== Disputed account ==
Historians dispute as unsubstantiated the claim of a "Jefferson-Lemen Secret Anti-Slavery Compact." During his life, Thomas Jefferson was known for being very diligent about keeping a copy of all of his written correspondence that he sent to others and also, "A careful examination of Jefferson's account book for the time period covering 2 May 1784, when Jefferson and Lemen supposedly met, through 31 December 1785 reveals no corresponding transaction.....'" whereby it is claimed that Thomas Jefferson secretly asked Lemen to move to Illinois (then Indiana Territory), and to take up the anti-slavery cause there.

=== Descendants ===
Lemen's son Rev. James Lemen Jr. (1787–1870) was a nationally known preacher and politician. Lemen graduated from Columbia University in 1806. He served as a Representative for Illinois for over 20 years and was offered the position of a Senator from the Governor of Illinois, but he declined the offer.

His great-great-grandson William Rainey Harper was the founder and first president of the University of Chicago. His great-granddaughter Mary Reed was married to Illinois Representative and Speaker of the House Joseph Gurney Cannon.

== See also ==
- History of slavery in Indiana
- Historial Marker for James Lemen
