= First Congregational Church (Terre Haute, Indiana) =

Historic church in Indiana, United States

- U.S. National Register of Historic Places
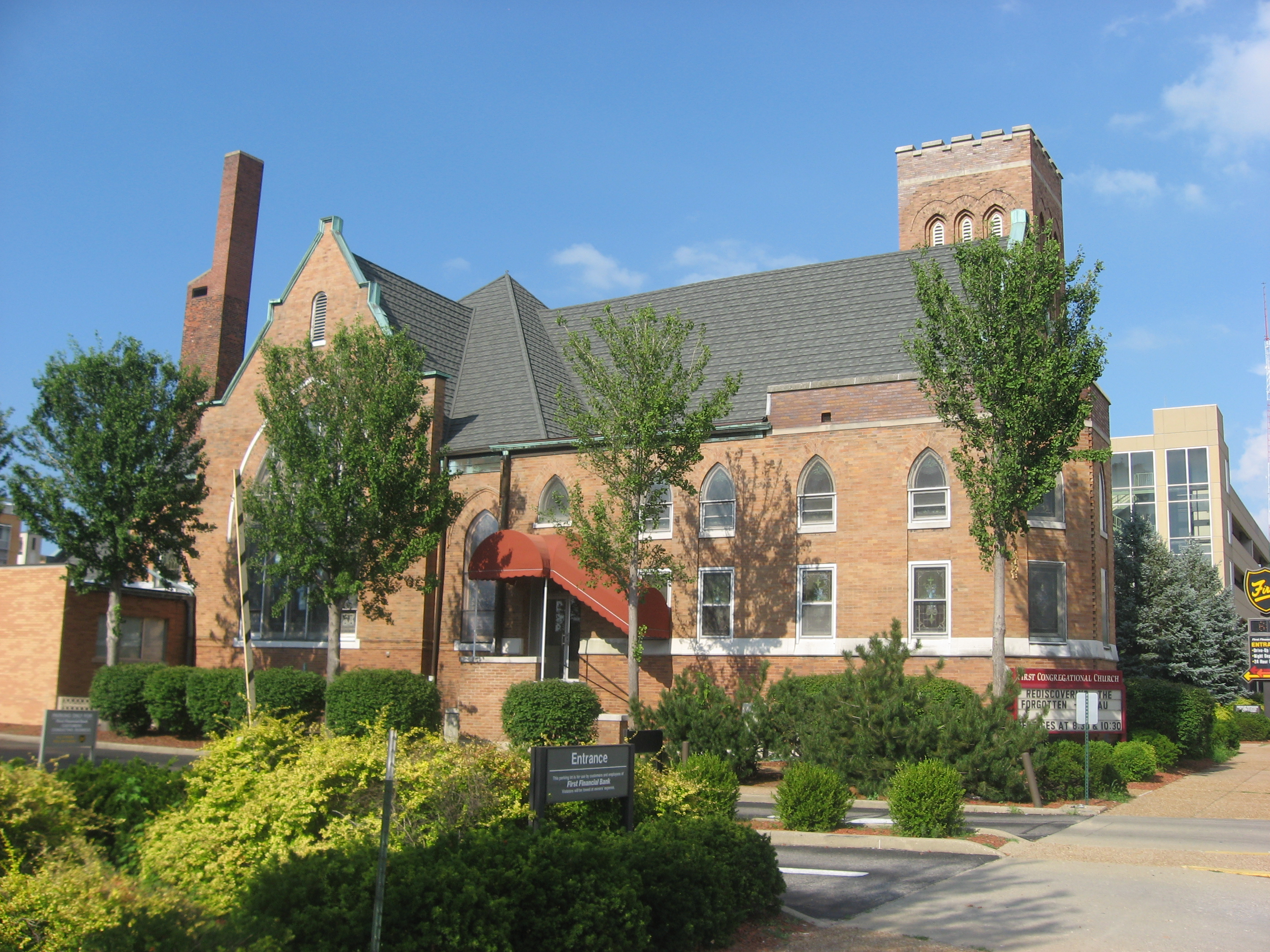
- First Congregational Church in summer

- Location within Vigo County, Indiana Location within Indiana Location within the United States
- Location: 630 Ohio St., Terre Haute, Indiana
- Coordinates: 39°27′57″N 87°24′33″W
- Area: less than one acre
- Built: 1902-1903
- Architect: Turnbull & Jones
- Architectural style: Gothic Revival
- MPS: Downtown Terre Haute MRA
- NRHP reference No.: 83000157
- Added to NRHP: June 30, 1983

First Congregational Church is an historic Congregational church located at 630 Ohio Street in Terre Haute, Indiana. It was built in 1902-1903 and is the second building to house the congregation founded in December 1834. It is a neo-Gothic-style church constructed of buff-colored brick with limestone trim and opalescent glass windows.

FCC was added to the National Register of Historic Places in 1983.

== Organization ==
FCC is a member of the National Association of Congregational Christian Churches (NACCC) and the Midwest Association of Congregational Christian Churches.
