= Constitution of Indiana =

American state constitution

The 1816 (superseded) and 1851 Constitutions of the State of Indiana, located in the Indiana Statehouse Rotunda.

The Constitution of Indiana is the highest body of state law in the U.S. state of Indiana. It establishes the structure and function of the state and is based on the principles of federalism and Jacksonian democracy. Indiana's constitution is subordinate only to the U.S. Constitution and federal law. Prior to the enactment of Indiana's first state constitution and achievement of statehood in 1816, the Indiana Territory was governed by territorial law. The state's first constitution was created in 1816, after the U.S. Congress had agreed to grant statehood to the former Indiana Territory. The present-day document, which went into effect on November 1, 1851, is the state's second constitution. It supersedes Indiana's 1816 constitution and has had numerous amendments since its initial adoption.

Indiana's constitution is composed of a preamble, articles, and amendments. Among other provisions, it specifies a republican form of government (pursuant to Article IV, Section 4, of the U.S. Constitution) consisting of three branches: executive (including administration), legislative, and judicial. The state constitution also includes a bill of rights, grants suffrage and regulates elections, provides for a state militia, state educational institutions, and sets limits on government indebtedness. The Indiana General Assembly may amend the constitution, subject to ratification by vote of the people, as specified in Article 16 of Indiana's 1851 constitution.

== Constitution of 1816 ==
=== Authorization ===
In 1811 the Indiana Territory's House of Representatives adopted a memorial to the U.S. Congress asking permission for its citizens "to form a government and constitution and be admitted to the Union", but the War of 1812 delayed the process until 1815. Some members of the territory's general assembly, as well as Thomas Posey, governor of the Indiana Territory, objected to statehood at that time. They believed that the territory's limited size and scattered population would make a state government too costly to operate. However, after a census authorized in 1814 proved that its population had reached 63,897, exceeding the minimum population requirement of 60,000 as outlined in the Northwest Ordinance of 1787, efforts to pass a request to consider statehood for Indiana were renewed.

On December 11, 1815, the territory's House of Representatives voted seven to five in favor of the memorial to Congress stating its qualification to become a state. The request was presented in the U.S. House of Representatives on December 28, 1815, and introduced in the U.S. Senate on January 2, 1816. A House committee chaired by Jonathan Jennings, Indiana's territorial representative, reported out a bill for an Enabling Act, which provided for the election of delegates to a convention to consider statehood for Indiana. The bill passed in the U.S. House on March 30, 1816, and in the U.S. Senate on April 13. President James Madison signed the Enabling Act into law on April 19, 1816. If a majority of the delegates to Indiana's constitutional convention agreed, the delegates would proceed to create a state constitution.

As outlined in the Enabling Act, election of delegates to Indiana's first constitutional convention took place on May 13, 1816. The convention at Corydon, the territorial capital in Harrison County, began on Monday, June 10, 1816. The convention's elected delegation of forty-three men were apportioned among the thirteen counties that were "in existence prior the 1815 General Assembly" and based on each county's population.

=== Political climate/issues ===
In the early nineteenth century some of the Indiana Territory's citizens opposed statehood. The major concerns were the loss of financial support from the federal government if it became a state and the fear of a tax increase to pay for the new state government. The minority group preferred to wait until later, when the population was even larger and the state's economy and political structure was more firmly established. The majority of the territory's citizens viewed statehood as an opportunity for more self-government and wanted to proceed. The territory's pro-statehood faction preferred to elect their own state officials instead of having the federal government appoint individuals on their behalf, formulate state laws, discontinue the appointed territorial governor's absolute veto power, and allow its citizens to have greater participation in national politics, including voting powers in Congress.

At the time the delegates were gathering at Corydon in June 1816, slavery had become a major and divisive issue in the territory. The indenture law of 1805 had been repealed, but slavery continued to exist within Indiana. Two major factions emerged. An anti-slavery/pro-democracy group was led by Jonathan Jennings and his supporters. Former territorial governor and future U.S. president William Henry Harrison's allies led the pro-slavery/less democratic group. Supporters of Indiana statehood (the pro-Jennings faction) favored democracy, election of state officials, and voting representation in Congress. Harrison's allies supported slavery within the territory and maintaining Indiana's territorial status with a federally appointed governor. The anti-slavery faction preparing for statehood hoped to institute a constitutional ban on slavery.

=== Constitutional Convention ===
On June 10, 1816, the first day of the convention, forty-two delegates convened at Corydon to discuss statehood for Indiana. The convention's forty-third delegate, Benjamin Parke, did not arrive until June 14. Thirty-four of the elected delegates agreed on the issue of statehood. On June 11, the delegation passed a resolution (34 to 8) to proceed with task of writing the state's first constitution and forming a state government.

Jonathan Jennings, who presided over the convention and was later elected the first governor of Indiana, appointed the delegates to various committees; William Hendricks, although he was not an elected delegate, served as the convention's secretary and was later elected as the new state's first representative to Congress. In addition to Jennings, notable members of the delegation included Franklin County delegates James Noble (who became the first U.S. Senator from Indiana after it achieved statehood) and Robert Hanna (who became Indiana's second U.S. Senator after statehood); Harrison County delegates Dennis Pennington and Davis Floyd; and among others, William Henry Harrison's friends and political allies: Benjamin Parke, John Johnson, John Badollet, and William Polke (delegates from Knox County), David Robb of Gibson County, and James Dill of Dearborn County.

Most convention delegates had ties to the South; all but nine had lived below the Mason–Dixon line before their arrival in the Indiana Territory. The youngest delegate (Joseph Holman of Wayne County) was twenty-eight; the oldest was fifty-eight. Eleven delegates had served in the territorial legislature and more than half of the delegates had previous legal training. Daniel Grass, the sole delegate from Warrick County, was excused on June 19 for the remainder of the convention due to ill health.

The delegation's basic tasks included selection of presiding officers, adoption of a set of convention rules, meetings in committees and as a whole group to discuss proposed articles for the new constitution, and adoption of a final version of the document. Although the members of the delegation did not all agree, a majority group, mostly associated with the anti-territorial governor and anti-slavery faction, emerged in favor of statehood. The opposing consisted mostly of Harrison's friends and supporters of the territorial legislature who opposed statehood.

The summer heat often caused the delegation to move outdoors and work beneath the shade of a giant elm tree that would later be memorialized as the Constitution Elm. (A portion of the trunk is still preserved.) The delegates completed their work on the constitution in nineteen days, adjourning on June 29, 1816. The total cost of the convention was $3,076.21, which included compensating the delegates and their assistants for each day they attended the convention, as well as printing costs for the final version of the document and the acquisition of benches, tables, books, and stationery for the delegates.

=== Adoption ===
The delegates adopted the constitution with a simply majority vote (33 to 8). The new constitution became effective on June 29, 1816, the last day of the convention, when the delegates signed the document. It was not submitted to Indiana's voters for ratification.

=== Summary and features ===
Indiana's 1816 constitution, considered the most important document in the state's history, represented the more democratic views of the pro-statehood/anti-slavery faction. The document emerged from the constitutional convention as a statement of the "values and beliefs" of Indiana's pioneer era.

The state's first constitution is similar to that of the other state constitutions written around the same time. Because Ohio and Kentucky were the newest states closest to Indiana, the delegates to the Indiana constitutional convention referred to the constitutions of these two states, along with others such as Pennsylvania, New Hampshire, and Tennessee, for ideas and concepts as well as specific text. Content from the other state constitutions was chosen based on the Indiana delegates' preferences for their new state. Occasionally, original text was composed for specific articles or sections when the appropriate wording in other state constitutions was not sufficient. The delegates' selections resulted in Indiana's legislative branch being dominant over the executive and judicial branches of state government.

The Indiana delegates organized a republican form of government and created a state constitution that outlined a basic framework for governmental functions. Instead of providing specific details on individual issues, the constitution's broadly defined principles enabled the state government to function as a loosely bound unit. "The People" were explicitly noted as being the sovereigns of the state.

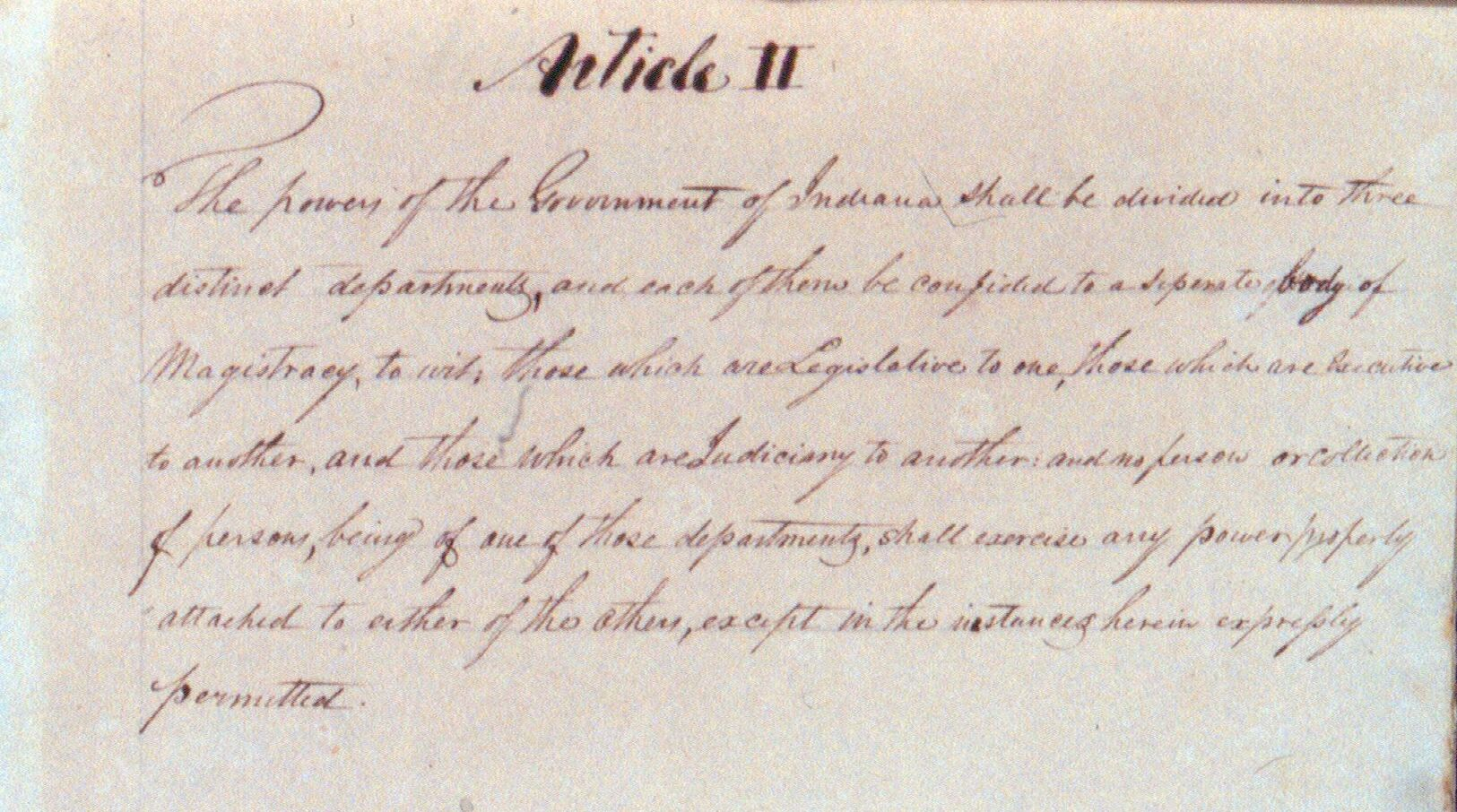
Article II of the 1816 Indiana Constitution

The preamble outlined Indiana's rights to join the Union "on equal footing with the original states" in accordance with the laws of the U.S. Constitution, the Northwest Ordinance of 1787, and the Enabling Act. Article I, which contained a bill of rights for Indiana's citizens, conferred many of the same rights as the U.S. Bill of Rights, including civil liberties and such basic freedoms as the freedom of speech, the right to bear arms, and freedom of religion, among others. Article II called for the separation of powers between the legislative, executive, and judicial branches of state government.

Articles III, IV, and V outlined the powers of the state's legislative, executive, and judicial branches of government. Its bicameral legislature divided powers between two chambers (the state's House of Representatives and its Senate), each one composed of elected members. The state legislature was set to meet annually. Elections would be held annually to elect representatives. State senators would serve three-year terms, with one-third of the senators being elected each year. The governor and lieutenant governor would be elected to serve a term of three years. Indiana's governor was limited to serving two consecutive terms. A simple majority vote in the legislature could override the governor's veto. Article IV also outlined the election of other state officials. The judicial branch, as outlined in Article V, included the state's Supreme Court, circuit courts, and other inferior courts. The constitution allowed the state legislature to create and adjust state courts and judicial districts and the governor was given the authority to appoint judges to serve seven-year terms with input and confirmations from the state senate.

Article VI granted voting rights to white males twenty-one years of age and older who were citizens of the United States had lived in Indiana for at least one year. Under Article VII all "able-bodied" white men between the ages of 18 and 45 were required to serve in the militia when called upon to do so. Non-whites (more specifically, blacks, mulattos, and Native Americans) were prohibited from serving in the militia. Conscientious objectors would be fined if they did not serve.

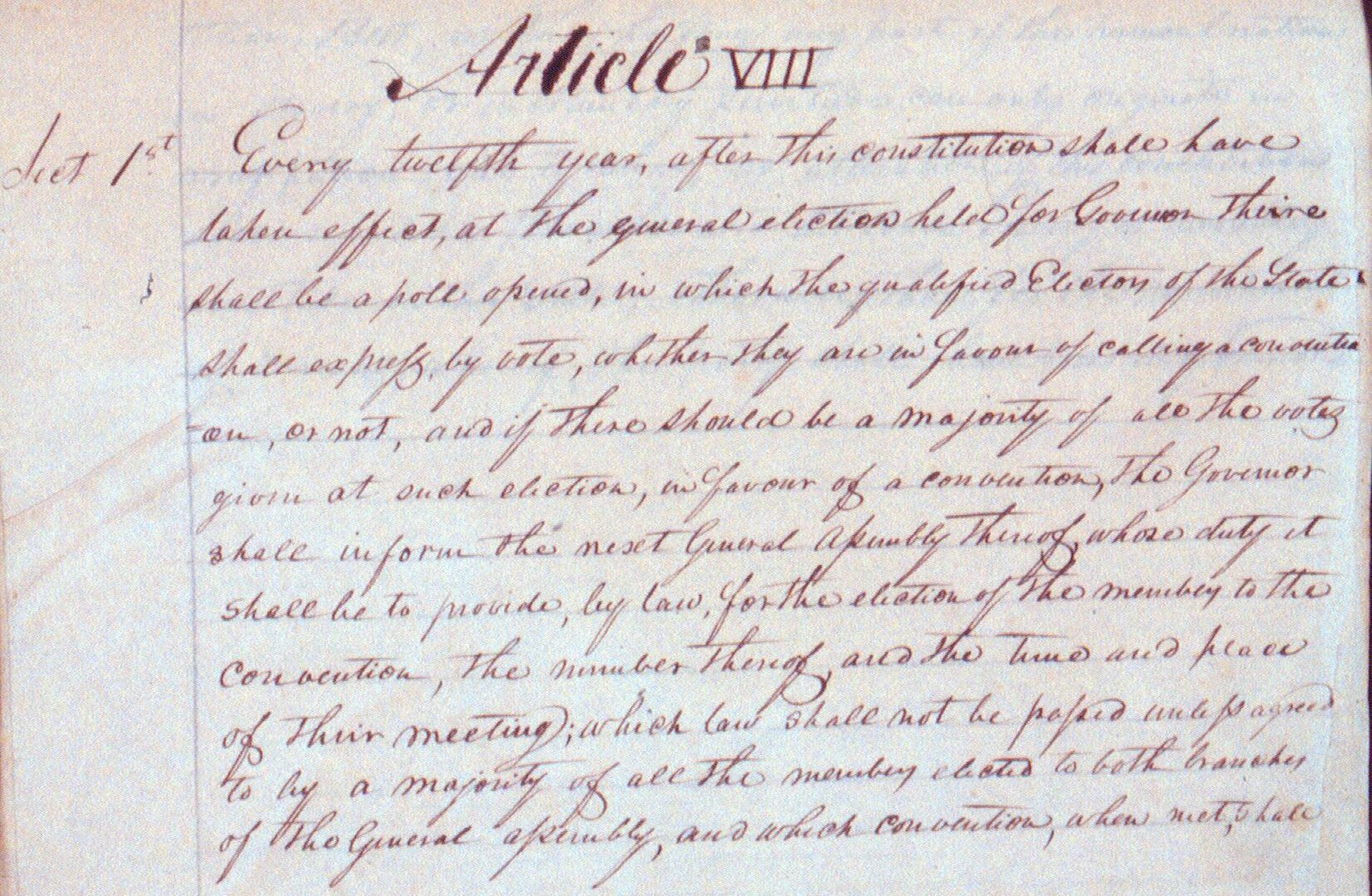
Article VIII, Section 1

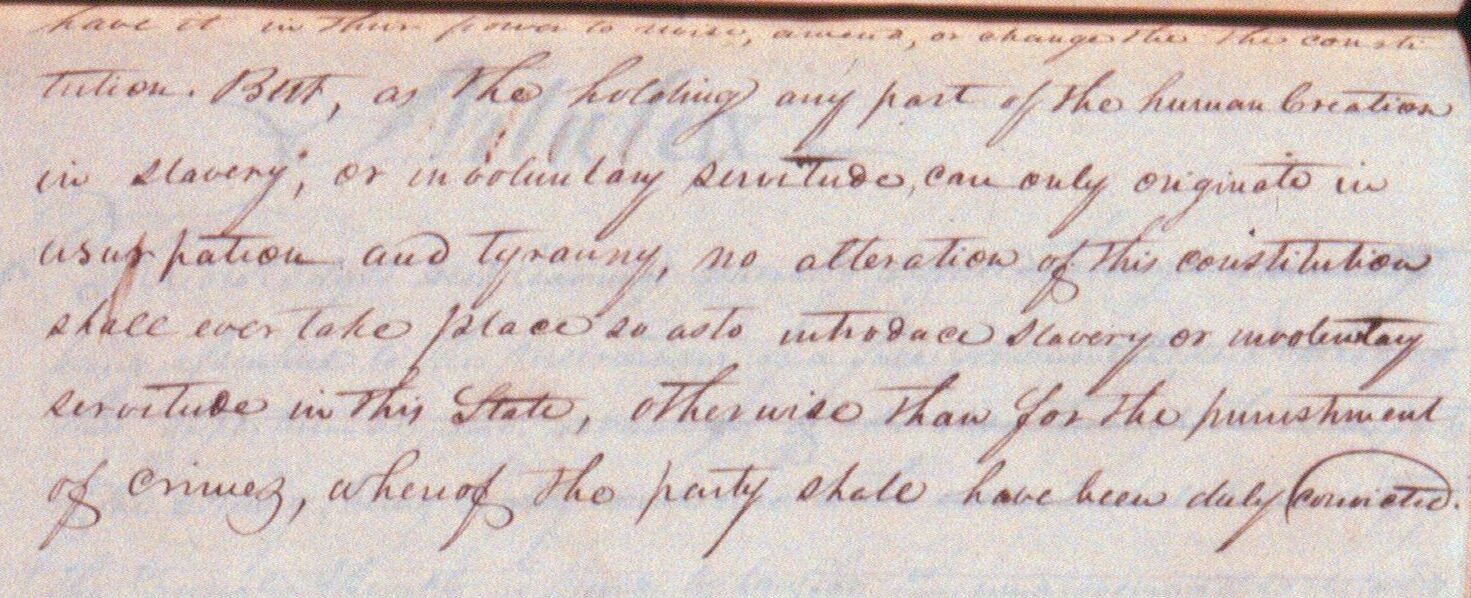
Article VIII, Section 1 (Continued)

The constitution's first mention of slavery appears in Article VIII, Section 1, which expressly prohibited alteration or amendment of the state constitution from ever permitting the introduction of slavery or involuntary servitude into the state. As one of the state constitution's most important provisions, this section allowed constitutional amendments for any reason other than the introduction of slavery or involuntary servitude. The anti-slavery clause in Article VIII stated: "But, as the holding any part of the human Creation in slavery, or involuntary servitude, can only originate in usurpation and tyranny, no alteration of this constitution shall ever take place so as to introduce slavery or involuntary servitude in this State, otherwise than for the punishment of crimes, whereof the party shall have been duly convicted." Indiana's 1851 constitution contains similar content, but clarified the legal status of slaves and indentured servants when they came into the state.

Article IX outlined plans for public education. Its central item, which was new to American constitutions, included a clause that established "As soon as circumstances will permit" a "general system of education, ascending in regular gradation, from township schools to a state university, wherein tuition shall be gratis and equally open to all." This was a significant alteration and expansion of the education clauses of the template constitutions used during the convention. Because the opening phrase did not provide a specific timetable for implementation, a state-supported system of public education was delayed until a new state constitution was adopted in 1851. Article IX also provided for a reform-based penal code, funding for libraries, and state institutions to care for the elderly and those in need.

Indiana's delegates wrote their own content for Article X, which outlined the state's banking provisions. Article XI outlined general provisions that named Corydon the seat of state government until 1825, established salaries for judges and state officials, and set the state's geographical boundaries. While Article VIII banned the future importation of slaves and indentured servants into Indiana, Article XI left open to interpretation the issue of whether it was acceptable to allow pre-existing slavery and involuntary servitude arrangements within the state. Article XII outlined the process for the transition from a territorial government to a state government. This included, among other tasks, the election of state officials and representation in the Indiana General Assembly and the U.S. Congress.

=== Transition to statehood ===
Elections of state officers were held under the laws of the Indiana Territory on August 5, 1816. Jonathan Jennings was elected governor, Christopher Harrison was elected lieutenant governor, and William Hendricks was elected to the U.S. House of Representatives. The Indiana General Assembly met for the first time under the new constitution and state government on November 4, 1816. Jennings and Harrison were inaugurated on November 7. The state legislature elected James Noble and Waller Taylor to the U.S. Senate on the following day. Hendricks was sworn into office and seated as a member of the U.S. House on December 2, 1816. President James Madison signed the congressional resolution admitting Indiana as the nineteenth state in the Union "on equal footing with the original states in all respects whatever" on December 11, 1816, which is considered the state's birthday. Noble and Taylor were sworn into office seated as members of the U.S. Senate on December 12, 1816. Jennings appointed three judges (Jesse Lynch Holman, John Johnson, and James Scott) to serve seven-year terms on the Indiana Supreme Court, effective December 28, 1816. The final step to achieve statehood for Indiana occurred on March 3, 1817, when a federal act was approved to extend federal laws to Indiana.

=== Criticisms and call for rewrite ===
The 1816 constitution was never amended, although some of its provisions were criticized after its adoption. Demands for changes to constitution were made as early as 1820, but referendums in 1823, 1828, 1840, and 1846 on holding a constitutional convention were unsuccessful. In addition, fifteen more efforts to convene a state constitutional convention were made between 1820 and 1847, but they also failed.

The most notable criticisms of the 1816 constitution were Corydon's identification as the seat of state government for the next nine years, inadequate provisions for amending the constitution, prohibition of salary increases for state government officials until 1819, term limits for judges, and a failure to provide for selection of a state attorney general or prosecuting attorney. Some critics felt that decisions regarding these issues were the responsibility of the elected representatives to the state legislature. Others who opposed statehood at the time viewed the new state constitution as "premature."

In the years following its adoption, rapid social change initiated the need to revise the state's constitution. Major concerns with the state's constitution related to the issue of slavery; limiting governmental powers and jurisdictions within the state; guaranteeing secrecy of ballots; continuing concerns over the amendment process for the constitution; reducing state legislation related to personal and local issues; granting more local power over school funding; suffrage for foreign-born residents; legislative terms and legislative sessions; the impeachment process for state officials; and governmental expenses and inefficiencies, among others. In addition, a financial crisis in the 1840s in Indiana due to overspending, a result of the Indiana Mammoth Internal Improvement Act, caused the state government to become insolvent. The state's financial situation and ongoing calls for constitutional changes to prevent another crisis increased interest in a constitutional mandate that prohibited the state from incurring debt. Another popular idea was holding biennial, as opposed to annual, legislative sessions as a cost-cutting measure.

Although there had been previous attempts to initiate another constitutional convention, the state legislature was finally successful in calling for Indiana's second constitutional convention until 1849. Its delegates convened at Indianapolis in 1850. The state constitution of 1816 was replaced with a new state constitution in 1851.

== Constitution of 1851 ==
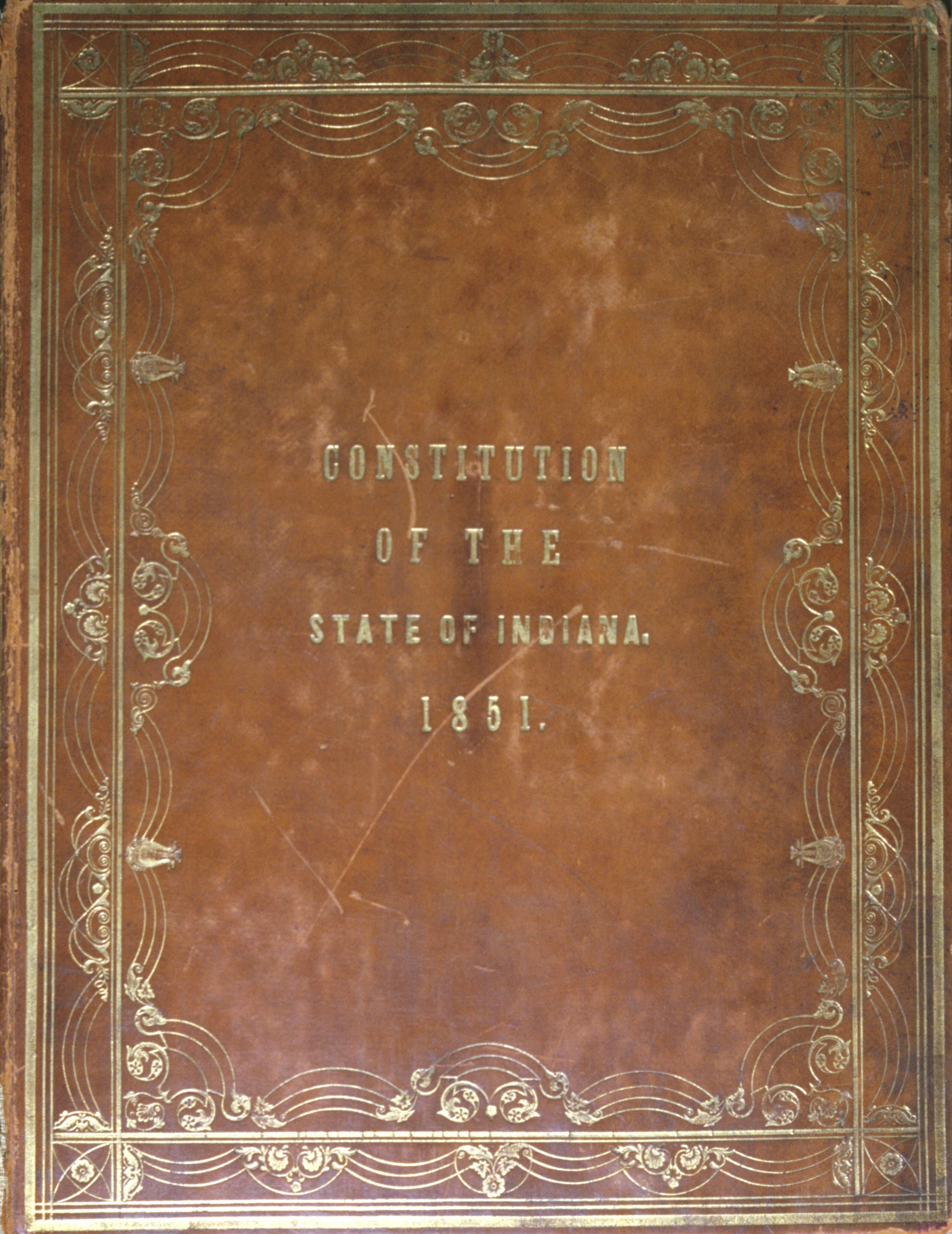
Cover of the Constitution of 1851

On January 15, 1849, the state legislature finally approved a referendum, after several previous unsuccessful attempts, to hold a constitutional convention in 1850, two years before the required twelve-year referendum mandated in the constitution of 1816, provided that a majority of voters favored the idea at the next regular election. In August 1849, a total of 81,500 voters favored and 57,418 opposed a constitutional convention. The clear majority caused the 1849–50 session of the Indiana General Assembly to pass legislation calling for the election in August 1850 of 150 delegates apportioned among the Indiana General Assembly's senatorial and representative districts and based on the number of voters within each district. The Whigs, the minority party in the state at that time, and some state officials, including Governor Paris C. Dunning, urged bipartisan representation at the convention. However, Indiana voters elected convention delegates along party lines. The result (95 Democrats and 55 Whigs) was roughly a two-thirds to one-third split between the two parties. A total of 74 delegates were born in southern states, 13 were native-born Hoosiers, and 57 were born in northern states other than Indiana. About 42 percent of the delegates were farmers and 25 percent were lawyers.

=== Constitutional Convention ===
The constitutional convention of 150 delegates convened in the Hall of Representatives at the Indiana Statehouse in Indianapolis on October 7, 1850. Charles H. Test called the meeting to order and George Whitfield Carr, the delegate from Lawrence County, was elected the convention's president. (Carr had been Speaker of the House in the two previous sessions of the Indiana General Assembly.) William Hayden English was elected to serve as the convention secretary, along with three assistant secretaries. Appointed officials included a sergeant-at-arms and a doorkeeper. Judge Isaac Blackford of the Indiana Supreme Court administered the oath of office. Convention delegates were appointed to twenty-two standing committees to review proposed items and considered 333 resolutions.

Prior to the convention, the state's political parties (Democrats and Whigs) adopted a set of proposals that they want to incorporate into the constitution. Whigs wanted offices in the executive, judicial, and legislative branches at all levels of government to be publicly elected offices; Article II expanded suffrage to all males over the age twenty-one, excluding blacks and foreign-born men; biannual sessions of the state legislature (as opposed to annual sessions); a ban on the state government from incurring public debt; minimum funding requirements for public schools; requiring the state legislature to only enact laws that had a statewide effect, ending private acts; and a reduction in the number of public officials, among other proposals. The Democrats adopted their own list of items after the Whigs, which included many of the same suggestions, and accused the Whigs of stealing their ideas.

Among the goals of the convention was to find ways to reduce the cost of state government and increase its efficiency. Topics of discussion included elections and appointment of local officials, sheriffs, commissioners, board members, judges, coroners, auditors, clerks, etc.; expansion of suffrage; biennial legislative sessions (as opposed to annual sessions); banning the state legislature from making local and special legislation; the impeachment process for local officials; property rights of married women; and public school reform, among other concerns. Notable Indiana statesmen who were members of the delegation and spoke at the convention included Thomas Hendricks, David Wallace, Schuyler Colfax, Horace P. Biddle, Robert Dale Owen, and Alvin P. Hovey, among others.

Delegates spent the first week of sessions organizing the convention. Because the House chamber in the statehouse was too small for the gathering, the state government rented the nearby Masonic Temple. The opening session in the Mason Temple convened on December 26, 1850. The convention, which cost $88,280.37 (~$2.64 million in 2024), included 127 days of sessions before adjourning on February 10, 1851. Prior to adjournment, the delegates mandated that the new constitution, if adopted by a majority of voters in the state, would go into effect on November 1, 1851. The revised state constitution included components of the 1816 state constitution and adopted proposals from the convention delegates, as well as ideas drawn from the constitutions of other states such as Illinois and Wisconsin, which were used as references. The final version of the constitution was based on Jacksonian democracy, which significantly expanded the democratic principles of individual rights, private enterprise, and legislative restrictions.

=== Adoption ===
Results by county of the 1851 exclusion referendum (Article 13) Yes: 90–100%; 80–90%; 70–80%; 60–70%; 50–60%; No: 60–70%; 50–60%

The constitution was submitted to the state's voters for their approval in the August 4, 1851, general election. Convention delegates mandated that voters consider Article 13 separately from the other sections of the constitution. Article 13 prohibited further immigration of African Americans into Indiana and encouraged their colonization outside the state. Voters could either approve or reject the remaining provisions of the new constitution as a whole. In the final tally, voters approved Article 13 with 113,828 votes in favor and 21,873 opposed, an 83.88 percent favorable approval rate. Only in Elkhart, LaGrange, Steuben, and Randolph counties did a majority of voters oppose the adoption of the article. Voters also approved the remaining sections of the constitution as a whole with 113,230 votes in favor and 27,638 opposed, an 80.38 percent favorable approval among voters. Ohio County was the only one where the majority of voters rejected the new constitution (315 voted in favor and 438 opposed).

On September 3, 1851, Governor Joseph A. Wright issued a proclamation certifying the favorable results for the new constitution, which went into effect on November 1, 1851. Elected officials in the state government were permitted to retain their seats until elections were held in October 1852, but had to take an oath to uphold the new constitution. Since its ratification, the state constitution of 1851 has been amended several times, but it remains the highest state law in Indiana.

=== Notable features and changes ===
The new constitution did not radically change the state's existing government. Although it expanded the bill of rights included in the 1816 document, the new constitution retained other features such as the basic frame of a limited self-government for the state. The 1851 version, which was longer and more detailed than the 1816 constitution, combined "Jacksonian Democracy with a vigorous emphasis on economic laissez faire," reflecting the state's financial crisis in the late 1830s and early 1840s. The new constitution also continued to support strong local control of government, confirming Indiana voters' general distrust of state government.

The constitution of 1851 placed several limitations on the Indiana General Assembly's activities. Biennial legislative sessions were limited to 61 consecutive days (40 consecutive days for special sessions). To prevent the state legislature from interfering in local affairs, the General Assembly was restricted to general legislation applicable to the entire state and limited local and special interest legislation. In addition, the state government was prohibited from going into debt. The new constitution gave the state legislature discretion on enacting banking laws in the state, but prohibited the state government "from becoming a stockholder in any bank or corporation, or loaning its credit to any individual or corporation." Because many Indiana voters objected to state-sponsored banks, the new constitution barred the charter of the Bank of Indiana from being extended with the state government as a stockholder and banned the creation of other state-funded banks.

Among the other important changes was the abandonment of the short ballot, where voters cast their ballots for a party's entire state of candidates instead of voting for individual offices. The Whig minority supported adoption of these changes, hoping to break the Democratic hold on power. Several other changes to the constitution related to election concerns. Terms for elected office included a two-year term for representatives and four-year terms for the governor and state senators. The constitution of 1851 also called for the popular election of more state government positions such as the secretary of state, state treasurer, state auditor, prosecuting attorney, and judges, as well as other county and local officials such as clerk, auditor, treasurer, sheriff, and coroner. In most cases, these officeholders were limited to two consecutive terms. In addition, the Supreme Court of Indiana was made an elective body. The number of Indiana Supreme Court judges was increased from three to five and their terms were extended to six years. The state's lower courts system was reorganized as well. For example, circuit court judges and local justices were made elective offices.

The constitution of 1851 extended voting rights to foreign-born men who had immigrated to Indiana. To vote in Indiana under the previous constitution, foreign-born men had to become naturalized U.S. citizens, which required a five-year residency requirement. Under the new constitution, aliens were granted suffrage if foreign-born men had reached the age of 21, stated their intention to become a naturalized citizen, and had lived in the United States for a year and in Indiana for at least six months.

The new constitution made a strong commitment to public school education, especially elementary schools (common schools), by mandating a "uniform system of common schools, equally open to all and free of tuition." The constitution also required the state government to adequately fund local elementary schools, while providing for boards of local residents to manage the funds and the schools. Constitutional changes also created a new elected office, the state superintendent of public instruction, and gave the state some authority in setting curriculum. During the convention, delegates also considered abolishing the "State University" and county seminaries. Although efforts to abolish the university were unsuccessful, Article 8, Section 2, of the new constitution authorized the sale of county seminaries with the proceeds to be used to help fund Indiana's public elementary schools. Article 8 did not specifically identify Indiana University or guarantee its financial support; however, the state legislature continued to provide funding to IU, despite some funding controversies in the early 1850s.

Because no divorce clause was included in the state constitution of 1816, the legislature assumed the authority to grant divorces, and continued to do so even after laws passed in 1818 granted the authority to circuit courts. Under the new constitution, the Indiana General Assembly was prohibited from making local and special laws. As a result, divorce proceedings, among other issues, were delegated to the courts and clerks.

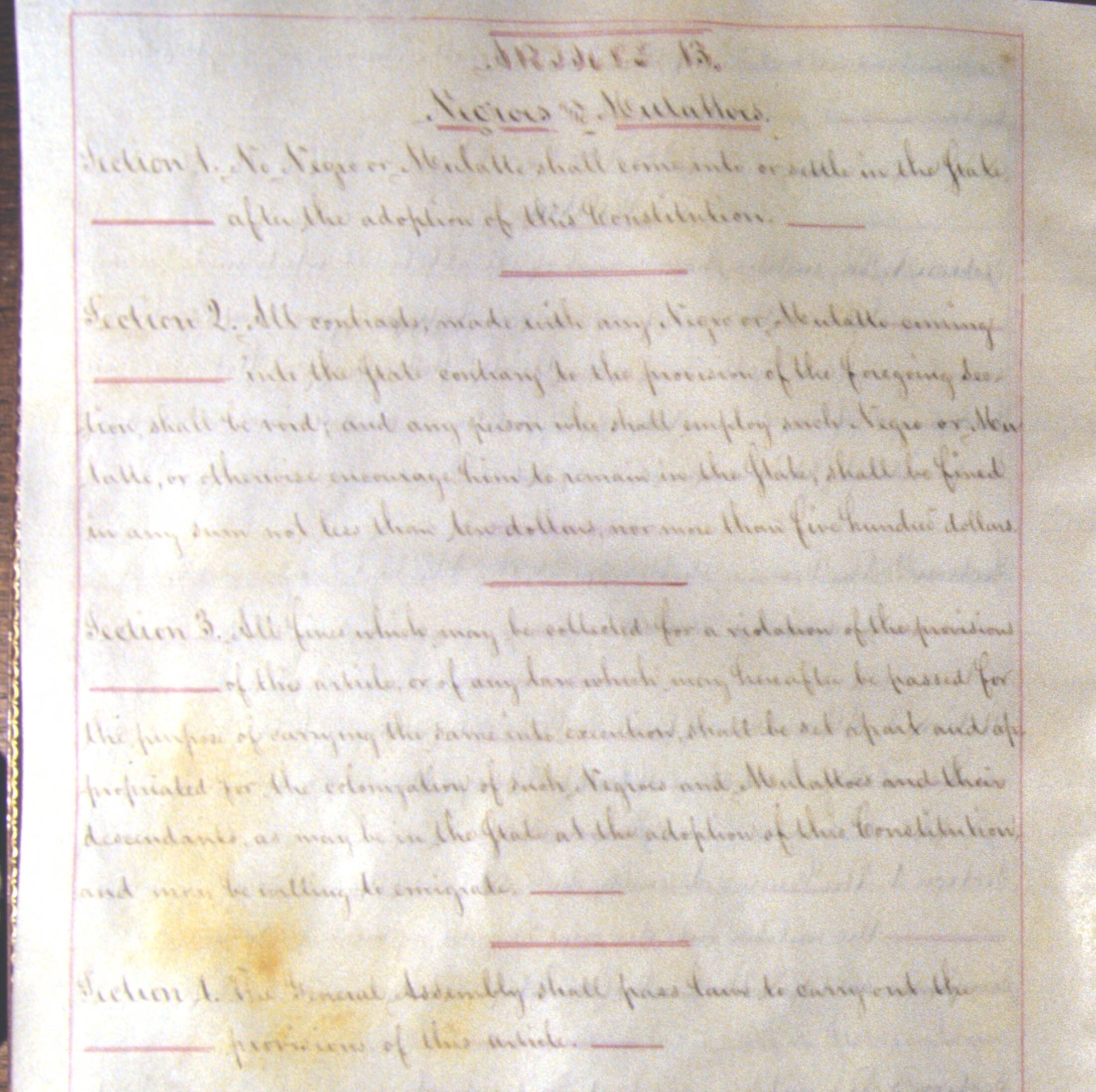
Article 13 of the 1851 Indiana Constitution

Despite the positive changes in state constitution, some articles continued racial and gender inequality by limiting full rights of state citizenship to white males. Fearing a negative impact on the state from a rising population of free people of color and emancipated slaves who had been expelled from slave states, convention delegates adopted Article 13, section 1, to ban further immigration of blacks and mulattos into Indiana. Revisions to the constitution also discouraged African Americans from settling permanently in the state. Some convention delegates openly advocated for the colonization of free people of color in Indiana to Liberia, which led to the adoption of Article 13, section 3. This particular section outlined a source of funding for those who chose to emigrate. Although the Indiana Supreme Court's ruling in Smith v. Moody (1866), struck down Article 13, making it invalid, it was removed by amendment in 1881.

Women's equal rights were also excluded from constitutional provisions. Convention delegate Robert Dale Owen introduced a proposal to include a clause in the new constitution granting married women the right to own private property and to jointly own property with her husband, but the effort failed. However, in the July 1853 legislative session, Owen secured passage of laws granting property rights to married women. The Indiana General Assembly passed additional legislation in 1879 and in 1881 to further protect widowed and married women's property rights.

=== Amendments ===
==== Article 2 (voting rights) ====
The early criticism of the constitution of 1851 was Indiana's lax election laws, which frequently led to election-day irregularities and accusations of voter fraud. Article 2, Section 2, outlined who was eligible to vote, but the constitution did not have specific provisions for voter regulations or include details to assure bipartisan election boards.

Among the constitutional amendments passed in 1881 was one that extended the state residency requirements from six months to one year and removed the word "white" from Section 2, which was already unenforceable due to the passage of the Fifteenth Amendment to the United States Constitution granting suffrage to African American men. The state legislature enacted a voters' rights law in 1917, but it was struck down by the Indiana Supreme Court in October of that year. Other amendments to Article 2, Section 2, occurred in 1921, 1976, and 1984. In September 1921, following the ratification of the Nineteenth Amendment, Indiana voters ratified a state constitution amendment to grant suffrage to women. The 1921 amendment also limited voting rights to U.S. citizens.

==== Article 10 (finances) ====
Indiana voters passed an amendment to institute a state income tax in 1932, resulting in the addition of Article 10, Section 8, to the state constitution.

==== Article 12 (military service) ====
Article 12, Section 1, allowed only white men to serve in the militia until voters passed an amendment in 1936 to remove this restriction. Article 12 was further amended in 1974 to revise sections 1 through 4 and repeal sections 5 and 6. Changes from the initial constitution included removal of term limits for militia officers and the requirement for conscientious objectors to pay a fee for their exemption from military service.

==== Article 13 revisions ====
Article 13 openly banned African Americans settlement in Indiana and imposed fines on anyone employing or helping them to settle in the state. The Indiana Supreme Court ruling in Smith v. Moody (1866) invalidated Article 13, which contained several restrictions against Black Americans, including prohibiting their immigration to the state after the adoption of the state constitution in 1851. State laws to enforce Article 13 were repealed in 1867. The exclusionary and colonization provisions in Article 13 were repealed by amendment and removed from Section 13 of the state constitution in 1881.

==== Reorganization state court system ====
Another problem was the organization of the courts. The Supreme Court became overloaded with cases and an appellate court was created at the turn of the century. During the 1970s a series of amendments were enacted to make the court constitutional and to reform the method of electing Supreme Court Justices. Justices were again made appointed positions, a list of candidates was created by the Indiana Judicial Nominating Commission, narrowed to three finalists and thus submitted to the governor who then chooses one. The Justice could then serve two years before being subjected to a retention election, if retained then the Justice could continue their term for up to ten years. All five of the justices must face a retention vote once every ten years on the ballot of that general election.

==== Extending legislative sessions ====
A constitution amendment passed in 1974 authorized the return to annual sessions of Indiana General Assembly; however, the governor was empowered to call special sessions of the state legislature if necessary. The long session, which occurred the year after an election, was left the same (61 days); however, the shorter legislative session in the following year was authorized to meet for a 30-day period. (The initial constitution of 1851 authorized biannual sessions of the General Assembly to meet for 61 consecutive days; special sessions were limited to 40 days.)

== Supreme Court constitutional decisions ==
=== Prohibition of slavery and indentured servitude ===
The unanimous Indiana Supreme Court decision in Lasselle v. State (1820) upheld Article 8 of the Indiana constitution of 1816, which prohibited slavery in the state, by ruling in favor of an enslaved woman who became known as Polly Strong and granting her freedom. In re Clark (1821), the state supreme court once again upheld Article 8 of the state's 1816 constitution, which also prohibited indentured servitude.

The Indiana Supreme Court rulings related to Article 13 (exclusion and colonization laws) of the constitution of 1851 were not as consistently in favor of this article as they were on Article 8 of the previous state constitution. In Barkshire v. State (1856), the state supreme court ruled in favor of Article 13, which banned further black immigration to Indiana. In this case, Arthur Barkshire was found guilty under Article 13 for bringing a black woman from Ohio into Indiana, where he married her. In Freeman v. Robinson (1855), another famous case from the 1850s, the state supreme court ruled in favor of Freeman, a free black man, by recognizing his "right to sue a federal marshal in a state court for assault and battery that occurred after his arrest, as well as extortion." In the Indiana Supreme Court case of Smith v. Moody (1866), Moody's defense argued that Smith was an African American who had immigrated to Indiana after 1851, a violation of Article 13 of the state constitution, and that the promissory note that Moody had given Smith was invalid under the Article 13. Ruling in Smith's favor, the state supreme court recognized Smith as a U.S. citizen and voided Article 13 of the state constitution on the grounds that it denied Smith his U.S. citizenship rights.

== Current Constitution ==
As of 2018, the Constitution of Indiana consists of a preamble and sixteen articles.

=== Preamble ===
The changes and the concerns in society can be noted by the comparison of the preambles in the original 1816 constitution, and the current constitution.

The preamble to the original 1816 constitution read:

"We the Representatives of the people of the Territory of Indiana, in Convention met, at Corydon, on monday the tenth day of June in the year of our Lord eighteen hundred and sixteen, and of the Independence of the United States, the fortieth, having the right of admission into the General Government, as a member of the union, consistent with the constitution of the United States, the ordinance of Congress of one thousand seven hundred and eighty seven, and the law of Congress, entitle "An act to enable the people of the Indiana Territory to form a Constitution and State Government, and for the admission of such state into the union, on an equal footing with the original States" in order to establish Justice, promote the welfare, and secure the blessings of liberty to ourselves and our posterity; do ordain and establish the following constitution or form of Government, and do mutually agree with each other to form ourselves into a free and Independent state, by the name of the State of Indiana."

The preamble of the current constitution reads:

"TO the END, that justice be established, public order maintained, and liberty perpetuated; WE, the PEOPLE of the STATE of INDIANA, grateful to ALMIGHTY GOD for the free exercise of the right to choose our own form of government, do ordain this CONSTITUTION."

=== Articles ===
Articles of the Constitution cover specific topics, as follows:

1. Article 1: Bill of Rights
2. Article 2: Suffrage and Election
3. Article 3: Distribution of Powers
4. Article 4: Legislative
5. Article 5: Executive
6. Article 6: Administrative
7. Article 7: Judicial
8. Article 8: Education
9. Article 9: State Institutions
10. Article 10: Finance
11. Article 11: Corporations
12. Article 12: Militia
13. Article 13: Indebtedness
14. Article 14: Boundaries
15. Article 15: Miscellaneous
16. Article 16: Amendments

=== Summary of provisions ===
- Article 1 (Bill of Rights) includes similar wording from the Declaration of Independence and the state's constitution of 1816 such as the people's "inalienable rights" such as "life, liberty, and the pursuit of happiness" and the people's right to govern themselves.
- Article 2 (Suffrage and Election) relates to election procedures, voter qualifications, eligibility of officeholders, and voting rights.
- Article 3 (Distribution of Powers) describing the three separate and distinct branches of state government is the shortest provision of the constitution and has one section consisting of one sentence: "Section 1. The powers of the Government are divided into three separate departments; the Legislative, the Executive including the Administrative, and the Judicial: and no person, charged with official duties under one of these departments, shall exercise any of the functions of another, except as in this Constitution expressly provided."
- Article 4 (Legislative) describes the authority and operations related to the Indiana General Assembly, as well as descriptions of the state's electoral districts and elections provisions, candidate eligibility, and term limits for members of the Indiana Senate and the Indiana House of Representatives.
- Article 5 (Executive) describes the authority, eligibility, election, succession, and term limits for the Governor of Indiana and the Lieutenant Governor of Indiana.
  - Section 1 states that the governor, who is elected for a four-year term, may not serve more than eight years in any twelve-year period.
  - Section 8 prohibits anyone holding a federal or state office from simultaneously holding the office of governor or lieutenant governor of Indiana.
- Article 6 (Administrative) provides for the election of various state- and county-level offices such as secretary, auditor, and treasurer; describes the authority, terms, and term limits for these officeholders; outlines the eligibility requirements for county and township offices; and provides for the election or appointment of county, township, and town offices.
- Article 7 (Judicial) describes the authority and operations of the state's court system, including the Indiana Supreme Court, Circuit Courts, and the lower courts; the allowable number of state supreme court judges; the organizational structure of the state's court system; court jurisdictions; court offices such as prosecuting attorneys and court clerks; and selection, eligibility; and term limits for judges and court officeholders.
  - Section 2 declares the Supreme Court of Indiana to be composed of one Chief Justice and not less than four or more than eight associate justices.
  - Section 15 provides that the four-year term limit for elective offices set forth in Article 15, Section 2, does not apply to judges and justices.
- Article 8 (Education) provides for the establishment and public funding of public schools that are free and enrollment is open to all, in addition to the election, duties, and term limits for the state's superintendent of public instruction.
- Article 9 (State Institutions) provides for the state to create and fund "education of the deaf, the mute, and the blind; and for the treatment of the insane" and "institutions for the correction and reformation of juvenile offenders," but county boards have the authority to "provide farms, as an asylum for those persons who, by reason of age, infirmity, or other misfortune, have claims upon the sympathies and aid of society."
- Article 10 (Finance) provides for state taxation and property assessment, as well as the approved uses and reporting requirements for the state's revenue.
  - Section 5 prohibits the state from incurring debt except in limited and specific situations such as wartime or for public defense.
- Article 11 (Corporations) describes the state's authority to invest of state funds and establish Indiana's banking laws and state-chartered financial institutions such as banks.
- Article 12 (Militia) provides for the organization, equipping, and training of a state militia, in addition to describing eligibility requirements for service.
  - Section 1 declares those eligible for service to be "all persons over the age of seventeen (17) years, except those persons who may be exempted by the laws of the United States or of this state."
- Article 13 (Indebtedness) limits indebtedness of municipal corporations to two percent of the property tax base except in the event of a war or certain other defined emergencies, if property owners in the affected area submit a petition request.
- Article 14 (Boundaries) sets the official boundaries for the state and various legal jurisdictions within these boundary lines and in relation to the adjacent states of Kentucky, Ohio, and Illinois.
- Article 15 (Miscellaneous) provides for the election, term limits, and eligibility of officeholders for offices not defined in other sections of the constitution; calls for the creation and use of a state seal; sets minimum limits on the size of Indiana counties; and prohibits the sale or lease of state-owned land on which the present-day Indiana Statehouse and adjacent state government buildings are built.
  - Section 2 limits the terms of offices created by the General Assembly that are not specified in other sections of the constitution to four years or less; however, appointed officeholders may serve unspecified term length "at the pleasure of the appointing authority".
  - Section 7 prohibits establishing any new or reducing any existing county to a size of less than 400 square miles (1,000 km^{2}).
  - Section 8 originally prohibited a lottery or sales of lottery tickets, but this entire section was repealed in November 1988.
- Article 16 (Amendments) outlines the process for amending the state constitution.

== See also ==
- Indiana Supreme Court
- Indiana Code
- State constitution (United States) for a list of links to state constitution articles
