= List of governors of Indiana =

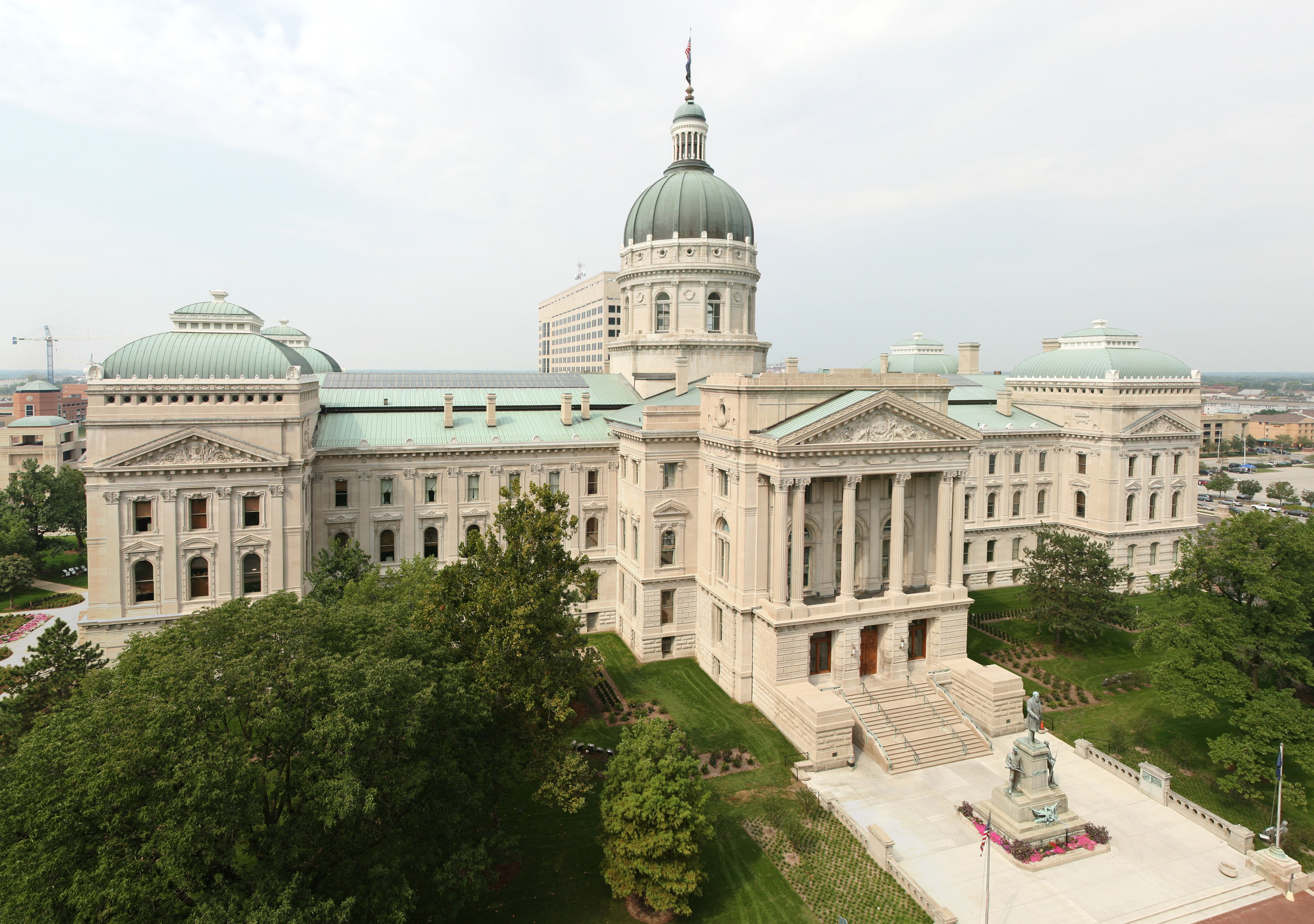
The Indiana Statehouse in Indianapolis, which houses the office of the governor

The governor of Indiana is the head of government of the U.S. state of Indiana. The governor is the head of the executive branch of Indiana's state government and is charged with enforcing state laws.

While a territory, Indiana had two governors appointed by the president of the United States. Since statehood in 1816, it has had 50 governors, serving 52 distinct terms; Isaac P. Gray and Henry F. Schricker are the only governors to have served non-consecutive terms. Four governors have served two four-year terms; territorial governor William Henry Harrison served for 11 years. The shortest-serving governor is Henry S. Lane, who served two days before resigning to become a U.S. senator. The current governor is Mike Braun, who took office on January 13, 2025.

== List of governors ==
=== Territory of Indiana ===
Indiana Territory was formed on July 4, 1800, from the Northwest Territory. Despite remaining a territory for nearly 16 years, it had only two governors appointed by the president of the United States before it became a state.

Governors of the Territory of Indiana
No.	Governor	Term in office (Note: The range given is from the date the governor was confirmed by the Senate, or appointed by the President during a Senate recess, to the date the governor left office.)	Appointed by
1	William Henry Harrison (Note: John Gibson served as acting governor during the absences of Governor William Henry Harrison.) (1773–1841)	May 13, 1800 (Note: Harrison was nominated on May 12, 1800, confirmed on May 13, and took office on July 4. He was reconfirmed by the Senate on February 8, 1803; recommissioned by the President for an interim term on May 5, 1806; reconfirmed by the Senate on December 17, 1806; and again on December 20, 1809.) – December 28, 1812 (4613 days; resigned) (Note: Harrison resigned; he had recently been commissioned a major general, and had been drawing pay from both jobs.)	John Adams
1	William Henry Harrison (1773–1841)	May 13, 1800 – December 28, 1812 (4613 days; resigned)	Thomas Jefferson
1	William Henry Harrison (1773–1841)	May 13, 1800 – December 28, 1812 (4613 days; resigned)	James Madison
2	Thomas Posey (1750–1818)	March 3, 1813 (Note: Posey was nominated on February 27, 1813, confirmed by the Senate on March 3, and took office on May 25.) – November 7, 1816 (1346 days; lost election)	James Madison

=== State of Indiana ===
Indiana was admitted to the Union on December 11, 1816.

The original 1816 Constitution of Indiana provided for the election of a governor and a lieutenant governor every three years, limited to six years out of any nine-year period. The second and current constitution of 1851 lengthened terms to four years and set the commencement of the governor's term on the second Monday in the January following the election. Governors were allowed to serve for four years in any eight-year period, but a 1972 amendment permitted governors to serve for eight years in any twelve-year period. Should the office of governor become vacant, the lieutenant governor becomes governor. If the office of lieutenant governor is vacant, the president pro tempore of the Indiana Senate becomes governor; this has happened once, when James B. Ray succeeded William Hendricks.

Governors of the State of Indiana
No. (Note: The official site labeled Mike Braun as the 52nd governor; based on this, repeat non-consecutive terms are numbered.)	Governor	Term in office	Party	Election	Lt. Governor (Note: Does not include acting lieutenant governors. Lieutenant governors represented the same party as their governor unless noted.)
1	Jonathan Jennings (1784–1834)	November 7, 1816 – September 12, 1822 (2136 days; resigned) (Note: Jennings resigned, having been elected to the United States House of Representatives.)	Democratic- Republican	1816	Christopher Harrison (resigned December 18, 1818) (Note: Jennings was appointed a United States commissioner to conclude a treaty with native tribes on April 15, 1818; after this time, Harrison was acting as governor. However, by accepting the post, Harrison believed Jennings had vacated the seat, and thus felt he had succeeded Jennings to the governorship. The state legislature declined to confirm this, and Harrison resigned on December 18, 1818.)
1	Jonathan Jennings (1784–1834)	November 7, 1816 – September 12, 1822 (2136 days; resigned)	Democratic- Republican	1816	Vacant
1	Jonathan Jennings (1784–1834)	November 7, 1816 – September 12, 1822 (2136 days; resigned)	Democratic- Republican	1819	Ratliff Boon
2	Ratliff Boon (1781–1844)	September 12, 1822 – December 4, 1822 (84 days; retired) (Note: Boon had already been reelected lieutenant governor when he succeeded Jennings.)	Democratic- Republican	Succeeded from lieutenant governor	Vacant
3	William Hendricks (1782–1850)	December 4, 1822 – February 12, 1825 (802 days; resigned) (Note: Hendricks resigned, having been elected to the United States Senate.)	Democratic- Republican	1822	Ratliff Boon (resigned January 30, 1824)
3	William Hendricks (1782–1850)	December 4, 1822 – February 12, 1825 (802 days; resigned)	Democratic- Republican	1822	Vacant
4	James B. Ray (1794–1848)	February 12, 1825 – December 7, 1831 (2490 days; term-limited) (Note: Under the 1816 constitution, governors were not capable of holding the office longer than six years in any term of nine years.)	Democratic- Republican (Note: Kallenbach labels Ray a Clay Republican, but Glashan and Sobel & Raimo label him a Democratic-Republican.)	Succeeded from president of the Senate (Note: As the office of lieutenant governor was vacant, president pro tempore of the Senate Ray succeeded Hendricks.)	Vacant
4	James B. Ray (1794–1848)	February 12, 1825 – December 7, 1831 (2490 days; term-limited)	Democratic- Republican	1825	John H. Thompson (Note: Represented the Jacksonian faction)
4	James B. Ray (1794–1848)	February 12, 1825 – December 7, 1831 (2490 days; term-limited)	Democratic- Republican	1828	Milton Stapp (Note: Represented no party)
5	Noah Noble (1794–1844)	December 7, 1831 – December 6, 1837 (2192 days; term-limited) (Note: Noble, being term-limited, had already lost election to the United States Senate when his term ended.)	National; Republican	1831	David Wallace
5	Noah Noble (1794–1844)	December 7, 1831 – December 6, 1837 (2192 days; term-limited)	Whig	1834	David Wallace
6	David Wallace (1799–1859)	December 6, 1837 – December 9, 1840 (1100 days; retired)	Whig	1837	David Hillis
7	Samuel Bigger (1802–1846)	December 9, 1840 – December 6, 1843 (1093 days; lost election)	Whig	1840	Samuel Hall
8	James Whitcomb (1795–1852)	December 6, 1843 – December 27, 1848 (1849 days; resigned) (Note: Whitcomb resigned, having been elected to the United States Senate.)	Democratic	1843	Jesse D. Bright (resigned December 8, 1845)
8	James Whitcomb (1795–1852)	December 6, 1843 – December 27, 1848 (1849 days; resigned)	Democratic	1843	Vacant
8	James Whitcomb (1795–1852)	December 6, 1843 – December 27, 1848 (1849 days; resigned)	Democratic	1846	Paris C. Dunning
9	Paris C. Dunning (1806–1884)	December 27, 1848 – December 5, 1849 (344 days; retired)	Democratic	Succeeded from lieutenant governor	Vacant
10	Joseph A. Wright (1810–1867)	December 5, 1849 – January 12, 1857 (2596 days; term-limited) (Note: Under the 1851 constitution, governors were ineligible to hold the office more than four years in any period of eight years.)	Democratic	1849	Jim Lane
10	Joseph A. Wright (1810–1867)	December 5, 1849 – January 12, 1857 (2596 days; term-limited)	Democratic	1852 (Note: First term under the 1851 constitution, which lengthened terms to four years.)	Ashbel P. Willard
11	Ashbel P. Willard (1820–1860)	January 12, 1857 – October 4, 1860 (1362 days; died in office)	Democratic	1856	Abram A. Hammond
12	Abram A. Hammond (1814–1874)	October 4, 1860 – January 14, 1861 (103 days; retired)	Democratic	Succeeded from lieutenant governor	Vacant
13	Henry S. Lane (1811–1881)	January 14, 1861 – January 16, 1861 (3 days; resigned) (Note: Lane resigned, having been elected to the United States Senate.)	Republican	1860	Oliver P. Morton
14	Oliver P. Morton (1823–1877)	January 16, 1861 – January 24, 1867 (2200 days; resigned) (Note: Morton resigned, having been elected to the United States Senate.)	Republican	Succeeded from lieutenant governor	Vacant
14	Oliver P. Morton (1823–1877)	January 16, 1861 – January 24, 1867 (2200 days; resigned)	Union	1864	Conrad Baker (Note: Baker acted as governor from October 1865 to March 1866 while Morton sought medical treatment.)
15	Conrad Baker (1817–1885)	January 24, 1867 – January 13, 1873 (2182 days; term-limited)	Union	Succeeded from lieutenant governor	Vacant
15	Conrad Baker (1817–1885)	January 24, 1867 – January 13, 1873 (2182 days; term-limited)	Republican	1868	William Cumback (resigned January 11, 1871)
15	Conrad Baker (1817–1885)	January 24, 1867 – January 13, 1873 (2182 days; term-limited)	Republican	1868	Vacant
16	Thomas A. Hendricks (1819–1885)	January 13, 1873 – January 8, 1877 (1457 days; term-limited) (Note: Hendricks, being term-limited, had already lost election for Vice President of the United States when his term ended.)	Democratic	1872	Leonidas Sexton (Note: Represented the Republican Party)
17	James D. Williams (1808–1880)	January 8, 1877 – November 20, 1880 (1413 days; died in office)	Democratic	1876	Isaac P. Gray
18	Isaac P. Gray (1828–1895)	November 20, 1880 – January 10, 1881 (52 days; retired) (Note: Gray had already lost the election for lieutenant governor when he succeeded Williams.)	Democratic	Succeeded from lieutenant governor	Vacant
19	Albert G. Porter (1824–1897)	January 10, 1881 – January 12, 1885 (1464 days; term-limited)	Republican	1880	Thomas Hanna
20	Isaac P. Gray (1828–1895)	January 12, 1885 – January 14, 1889 (1464 days; term-limited)	Democratic	1884	Mahlon Dickerson Manson (resigned July 1886)
20	Isaac P. Gray (1828–1895)	January 12, 1885 – January 14, 1889 (1464 days; term-limited)	Democratic	1884	Vacant
21	Alvin Peterson Hovey (1821–1891)	January 14, 1889 – November 23, 1891 (1044 days; died in office)	Republican	1888	Ira Joy Chase
22	Ira Joy Chase (1834–1895)	November 23, 1891 – January 9, 1893 (414 days; lost election)	Republican	Succeeded from lieutenant governor	Vacant
23	Claude Matthews (1845–1898)	January 9, 1893 – January 11, 1897 (1464 days; term-limited)	Democratic	1892	Mortimer Nye
24	James A. Mount (1843–1901)	January 11, 1897 – January 14, 1901 (1464 days; term-limited)	Republican	1896	William S. Haggard
25	Winfield T. Durbin (1847–1928)	January 14, 1901 – January 9, 1905 (1457 days; term-limited)	Republican	1900	Newton W. Gilbert
26	Frank Hanly (1863–1920)	January 9, 1905 – January 11, 1909 (1464 days; term-limited)	Republican	1904	Hugh Thomas Miller
27	Thomas R. Marshall (1854–1925)	January 11, 1909 – January 13, 1913 (1464 days; term-limited) (Note: Marshall, being term-limited, had already been elected Vice President of the United States when his term ended.)	Democratic	1908	Frank J. Hall
28	Samuel M. Ralston (1857–1925)	January 13, 1913 – January 8, 1917 (1457 days; term-limited)	Democratic	1912	William P. O'Neill
29	James P. Goodrich (1864–1940)	January 8, 1917 – January 10, 1921 (1464 days; term-limited)	Republican	1916	Edgar D. Bush
30	Warren T. McCray (1865–1938)	January 10, 1921 – April 30, 1924 (1207 days; resigned) (Note: McCray resigned following his conviction for mail fraud, and served three years in prison; he was pardoned by President Herbert Hoover in 1930.)	Republican	1920	Emmett Forest Branch
31	Emmett Forest Branch (1874–1932)	April 30, 1924 – January 12, 1925 (258 days; retired)	Republican	Succeeded from lieutenant governor	Vacant
32	Edward L. Jackson (1873–1954)	January 12, 1925 – January 14, 1929 (1464 days; term-limited)	Republican	1924	F. Harold Van Orman
33	Harry G. Leslie (1878–1937)	January 14, 1929 – January 9, 1933 (1457 days; term-limited)	Republican	1928	Edgar D. Bush
34	Paul V. McNutt (1891–1955)	January 9, 1933 – January 11, 1937 (1464 days; term-limited)	Democratic	1932	M. Clifford Townsend
35	M. Clifford Townsend (1884–1954)	January 11, 1937 – January 13, 1941 (1464 days; term-limited)	Democratic	1936	Henry F. Schricker
36	Henry F. Schricker (1883–1966)	January 13, 1941 – January 8, 1945 (1457 days; term-limited) (Note: Schricker, being term-limited, had already lost election to the United States Senate.)	Democratic	1940	Charles M. Dawson
37	Ralph F. Gates (1893–1978)	January 8, 1945 – January 10, 1949 (1464 days; term-limited)	Republican	1944	Richard T. James (resigned April 1, 1948)
37	Ralph F. Gates (1893–1978)	January 8, 1945 – January 10, 1949 (1464 days; term-limited)	Republican	1944	Vacant
37	Ralph F. Gates (1893–1978)	January 8, 1945 – January 10, 1949 (1464 days; term-limited)	Republican	1944	Rue J. Alexander (appointed April 14, 1948) (died January 2, 1949)
37	Ralph F. Gates (1893–1978)	January 8, 1945 – January 10, 1949 (1464 days; term-limited)	Republican	1944	Vacant
38	Henry F. Schricker (1883–1966)	January 10, 1949 – January 12, 1953 (1464 days; term-limited)	Democratic	1948	John A. Watkins
39	George N. Craig (1909–1992)	January 12, 1953 – January 14, 1957 (1464 days; term-limited)	Republican	1952	Harold W. Handley
40	Harold W. Handley (1909–1972)	January 14, 1957 – January 9, 1961 (1457 days; term-limited)	Republican	1956	Crawford F. Parker
41	Matthew E. Welsh (1912–1995)	January 9, 1961 – January 11, 1965 (1464 days; term-limited)	Democratic	1960	Richard O. Ristine
42	Roger D. Branigin (1902–1975)	January 11, 1965 – January 13, 1969 (1464 days; term-limited)	Democratic	1964	Robert L. Rock
43	Edgar Whitcomb (1917–2016)	January 13, 1969 – January 8, 1973 (1457 days; term-limited)	Republican	1968	Richard E. Folz
44	Otis Bowen (1918–2013)	January 8, 1973 – January 12, 1981 (2927 days; term-limited) (Note: Under a 1972 amendment to the constitution, governors are ineligible to hold the office more than eight years in any period of twelve years.)	Republican	1972	Robert D. Orr
44	Otis Bowen (1918–2013)	January 8, 1973 – January 12, 1981 (2927 days; term-limited)	Republican	1976	Robert D. Orr
45	Robert D. Orr (1917–2004)	January 12, 1981 – January 9, 1989 (2920 days; term-limited)	Republican	1980	John Mutz
45	Robert D. Orr (1917–2004)	January 12, 1981 – January 9, 1989 (2920 days; term-limited)	Republican	1984	John Mutz
46	Evan Bayh (b. 1955)	January 9, 1989 – January 13, 1997 (2927 days; term-limited)	Democratic	1988	Frank O'Bannon
46	Evan Bayh (b. 1955)	January 9, 1989 – January 13, 1997 (2927 days; term-limited)	Democratic	1992	Frank O'Bannon
47	Frank O'Bannon (1930–2003)	January 13, 1997 – September 13, 2003 (2435 days; died in office)	Democratic	1996	Joe Kernan
47	Frank O'Bannon (1930–2003)	January 13, 1997 – September 13, 2003 (2435 days; died in office)	Democratic	2000	Joe Kernan
48	Joe Kernan (1946–2020)	September 13, 2003 – January 10, 2005 (486 days; lost election)	Democratic	Succeeded from lieutenant governor	Vacant
48	Joe Kernan (1946–2020)	September 13, 2003 – January 10, 2005 (486 days; lost election)	Democratic	Succeeded from lieutenant governor	Kathy Davis (appointed October 20, 2003)
49	Mitch Daniels (b. 1949)	January 10, 2005 – January 14, 2013 (2927 days; term-limited)	Republican	2004	Becky Skillman
49	Mitch Daniels (b. 1949)	January 10, 2005 – January 14, 2013 (2927 days; term-limited)	Republican	2008	Becky Skillman
50	Mike Pence (b. 1959)	January 14, 2013 – January 9, 2017 (1457 days; withdrew) (Note: Pence won the Republican nomination, but withdrew on July 15, 2016, when Republican presidential nominee Donald Trump selected Pence as his vice presidential running mate. As Pence was barred by Indiana law from simultaneously running for both offices, he subsequently withdrew from the gubernatorial election.)	Republican	2012	Sue Ellspermann (resigned March 2, 2016)
50	Mike Pence (b. 1959)	January 14, 2013 – January 9, 2017 (1457 days; withdrew)	Republican	2012	Vacant
50	Mike Pence (b. 1959)	January 14, 2013 – January 9, 2017 (1457 days; withdrew)	Republican	2012	Eric Holcomb (appointed March 3, 2016)
51	Eric Holcomb (b. 1968)	January 9, 2017 – January 13, 2025 (2927 days; term-limited)	Republican	2016	Suzanne Crouch
51	Eric Holcomb (b. 1968)	January 9, 2017 – January 13, 2025 (2927 days; term-limited)	Republican	2020	Suzanne Crouch
52	Mike Braun (b. 1954)	January 13, 2025 – Incumbent (Note: Braun's term will expire on January 8, 2029.) (in office 679 days)	Republican	2024	Micah Beckwith

== See also ==
- Gubernatorial lines of succession in the United States § Indiana
- First Lady of Indiana
- Lieutenant Governor of Indiana
- List of Indiana General Assemblies

== Sources ==
- "Former Indiana Governors". National Governors Association.
- "Indiana Constitution". State Democracy Research Initiative. University of Wisconsin Law School.
- Dubin, Michael J. (2003). United States Gubernatorial Elections, 1776–1860: The Official Results by State and County. McFarland. ISBN 0-7864-1439-1 – via Internet Archive.
- Glashan, Roy R. (1979). American Governors and Gubernatorial Elections, 1775-1978. Meckler Books. ISBN 0-7201-1511-6 – via Internet Archive.
- Kallenbach, Joseph E.; Kallenbach, Jessamine S. (1977). American State Governors, 1776-1976. Oceana Publications. ISBN 978-0-379-00665-0 – via Internet Archive.
- McMullin, Thomas A.; Walker, David (1984). Biographical Directory of American Territorial Governors. Meckler Publishing. ISBN 0-930466-11-X – via Internet Archive.
- Mullaney, Marie Marmo (1994). Biographical Directory of the Governors of the United States, 1988–1994. Greenwood Publishing Group. ISBN 0-313-28312-5 – via Internet Archive.
- Sobel, Robert; Raimo, John (1978). Biographical Directory of the Governors of the United States, 1789-1978. Vol. 1. Meckler Books. ISBN 0-930466-01-2 – via Internet Archive.
- Thorpe, Francis Newton, ed. (1909). The Federal and State Constitutions, Colonial Charters, and Other Organic Laws of the States, Territories, and Colonies Now or Heretofore Forming the United States of America. Vol. 2. United States Government Publishing Office – via Internet Archive.
