= Indiana gubernatorial elections =

The Governor of Indiana is elected to a four-year term and responsible for overseeing the day-to-day management of the functions of many agencies of the Indiana state government.

== 1816–1850 ==
Under the original constitution of 1816, the state held gubernatorial elections every three years. The first election was held before statehood was approved, in August 1816. Until the constitution was replaced in 1851, elections were held in October, and winners took office in December.

1816 Indiana gubernatorial election
Party	Candidate	Votes	%
Democratic-Republican	Jonathan Jennings	5,211	57
Democratic-Republican	Thomas Posey (incumbent territorial governor)	3,934	43

1819 Indiana gubernatorial election
Party	Candidate	Votes	%
Democratic-Republican	Jonathan Jennings (incumbent)	11,256	84.9
Independent	Christopher Harrison	2,008	15.1
Independent	Samuel Carr	80	—

1822 Indiana gubernatorial election
Party	Candidate	Votes	%
Democratic-Republican	William Hendricks	18,340	100

1825 Indiana gubernatorial election
Party	Candidate	Votes	%
Independent	James B. Ray	13,140	55.8
Whig	Isaac Blackford	10,418	44.2

1828 Indiana gubernatorial election
Party	Candidate	Votes	%
Independent	James B. Ray (incumbent)	15,131	39.6
Whig	Israel T. Branby	12,251	31.8
Democratic	Harbin H. Moore	10,898	28.6

1831 Indiana gubernatorial election
Party	Candidate	Votes	%
Whig	Noah Noble	25,318	47.6
Democratic	James G. Reed	21,002	39.5
Independent	Milton Sapp	6,894	13

1834 Indiana gubernatorial election
Party	Candidate	Votes	%
Whig	Noah Noble (incumbent)	27,767	58.1
Democratic	James G. Reed	19,994	41.9

1837 Indiana gubernatorial election
Party	Candidate	Votes	%
Whig	David Wallace	45,240	55.6
Whig	John Dumont	36,197	44.4

1840 Indiana gubernatorial election
Party	Candidate	Votes	%
Whig	Samuel Bigger	62,932	53.7
Democratic	Tilghman Howard	54,274	46.3
Liberty	James Duncan	30	—

1843 Indiana gubernatorial election
Party	Candidate	Votes	%
Democratic	James Whitcomb	60,784	50.2
Whig	Samuel Bigger (incumbent)	58,721	48.5
Liberty	Elizur Demming	1,683	1.3

1846 Indiana gubernatorial election
Party	Candidate	Votes	%
Democratic	James Whitcomb (incumbent)	64,104	50.7
Whig	Joseph G. Marshall	60,138	47.5
Liberty	Stephen Stevens	2,301	1.8

1849 Indiana gubernatorial election
Party	Candidate	Votes	%
Democratic	Joseph A. Wright	76,996	52.3
Whig	John A. Matson	67,218	45.6
Free Soil	James H. Cravens	3,076	2.1

== 1851–1971 ==
In 1851, Indiana adopted its second and current constitution, which banned governors from serving consecutive terms and lengthened terms to four years. Elections since then have been held on Election Day in November during years divisible by four, concurrent with presidential elections.

1852 Indiana gubernatorial election
Party	Candidate	Votes	%
Democratic	Joseph A. Wright (incumbent)	95,576	55.4
Whig	Nicholas McCarty	73,641	42.7
Free Soil	James H. Cravens	3,308	1.9

1856 Indiana gubernatorial election
Party	Candidate	Votes	%
Democratic	Ashbel P. Willard	117,981	51.3
Republican	Oliver P. Morton	112,139	48.7

1860 Indiana gubernatorial election
Party	Candidate	Votes	%
Republican	Henry S. Lane	139,675	51.8
Democratic	Thomas Hendricks	129,968	48.2

1864 Indiana gubernatorial election
Party	Candidate	Votes	%
Republican	Oliver P. Morton (incumbent)	152,084	53.7
Democratic	Joseph E. McDonald	131,201	46.3

1868 Indiana gubernatorial election
Party	Candidate	Votes	%
Republican	Conrad Baker (incumbent)	171,575	50.1
Democratic	Thomas Hendricks	170,614	49.9

1872 Indiana gubernatorial election
Party	Candidate	Votes	%
Democratic	Thomas Hendricks	189,242	50.1
Republican	Thomas M. Browne	188,276	49.9

1876 Indiana gubernatorial election
Party	Candidate	Votes	%
Democratic	James D. Williams	213,219	49.1
Republican	Benjamin Harrison	208,080	47.9
Greenback	Anson Woolcott	??	

1880 Indiana gubernatorial election
Party	Candidate	Votes	%
Republican	Albert G. Porter	231,405	49.2
Democratic	Franklin Landers	224,452	47.7
Greenback	Richard Gregg	14,881	3.2

1884 Indiana gubernatorial election
Party	Candidate	Votes	%
Democratic	Isaac P. Gray	245,140	49.5
Republican	William H. Calkins	237,748	48.0
Greenback	Hiram Z. Leonard	8,338	1.7
Prohibition	Robert S. Dwiggins	3,868	0.8

1888 Indiana gubernatorial election
Party	Candidate	Votes	%
Republican	Alvin P. Hovey	281,752	49.0
Democratic	Courtland C. Matson	280,603	48.8
Prohibition	JS Hughes	9,920	2.2

1892 Indiana gubernatorial election
Party	Candidate	Votes	%
Democratic	Claude Matthews	233,881	47.5
Republican	Ira J. Chase (incumbent)	214,302	46.2
Populist	Leroy Templeton	22,401	3.5
Prohibition	Aaron Wirth	12,960	1.1

1896 Indiana gubernatorial election
Party	Candidate	Votes	%
Republican	James A. Mount	321,032	47.7
Democratic	Benjamin F. Shively	294,855	47.0
Populist	Thomas Wadsworth	8,525	1.4
Prohibition	Leonard M. Christ	2,996	0.5

1900 Indiana gubernatorial election
Party	Candidate	Votes	%
Republican	Winfield T. Durbin	331,531	50.5
Democratic	John W. Kern	306,272	46.7
Prohibition	Charles N. Eckhart	13,453	2.1
Populist	A.G. Burkhart	1,504	0.2

1904 Indiana gubernatorial election
Party	Candidate	Votes	%
Republican	Frank Hanly	359,362	53.5
Democratic	John Kern	274,998	41.0
Prohibition	McWhirter	22,690	3.4
Socialist	Hallenberger	10,991	1.6
Populist	Leroy Templeton	2,605	0.4

1908 Indiana gubernatorial election
Party	Candidate	Votes	%
Democratic	Thomas R. Marshall	348,439	49.5
Republican	James E. Watson	338,262	48.0
Prohibition	Samuel W. Haynes	15,926	2.3
Populist	F.J.S. Robinson	986	0.1

1912 Indiana gubernatorial election
Party	Candidate	Votes	%
Democratic	Samuel M. Ralston	275,357	48.1
Progressive	Albert J. Beveridge	166,124	28.6
Republican	Winfield T. Durbin	142,850	26.7
Prohibition	Leonard M. Christ	22,352	3.1

1916 Indiana gubernatorial election
Party	Candidate	Votes	%
Republican	James P. Goodrich	337,831	47.8
Democratic	John A. M. Adair	325,060	46.0
Prohibition	William Hickman	16,401	2.3
Progressive	Frank Hanly	7,067	1

1920 Indiana gubernatorial election
Party	Candidate	Votes	%
Republican	Warren T. McCray	683,253	54.6
Democratic	Carleton B. McCulloch	515,252	41.2

1924 Indiana gubernatorial election
Party	Candidate	Votes	%
Republican	Edward L. Jackson	654,784	52.9
Democratic	Carleton B. McCulloch	572,303	46.3
Prohibition		9,947	0.8

1928 Indiana gubernatorial election
Party	Candidate	Votes	%
Republican	Harry G. Leslie	728,203	51.3
Democratic	Frank Dailey	683,545	48.1
Prohibition		8,517	0.6

1932 Indiana gubernatorial election
Party	Candidate	Votes	%
Democratic	Paul V. McNutt	862,127	55.0
Republican	Raymond Springer	669,797	42.8

1936 Indiana gubernatorial election
Party	Candidate	Votes	%
Democratic	M. Clifford Townsend	908,494	55.4
Republican	Raymond Springer	727,526	44.3

1940 Indiana gubernatorial election
Party	Candidate	Votes	%
Democratic	Henry F. Schricker	889,620	49.9
Republican	Glenn R. Hillis	885,657	49.7

1944 Indiana gubernatorial election
Party	Candidate	Votes	%
Republican	Ralph F. Gates	849,346	51.0
Democratic	Samuel D. Jackson	802,765	48.2

1948 Indiana gubernatorial election
Party	Candidate	Votes	%
Democratic	Henry F. Schricker	884,995	53.6
Republican	Hobart Creighton	745,892	45.1

1952 Indiana gubernatorial election
Party	Candidate	Votes	%
Republican	George N. Craig	1,075,685	55.7
Democratic	John A. Watkins	841,984	43.6

1956 Indiana gubernatorial election
Party	Candidate	Votes	%
Republican	Harold W. Handley	1,086,868	55.6
Democratic	Ralph Tucker	859,393	44.0

1960 Indiana gubernatorial election
Party	Candidate	Votes	%
Democratic	Matthew E. Welsh	1,072,717	50.39
Republican	Crawford F. Parker	1,049,540	49.30
Prohibition	J. Ralston Miller	5,892	0.28
Socialist Labor	Herman Kronewitter	816	0.04

1964 Indiana gubernatorial election
Party	Candidate	Votes	%
Democratic	Roger D. Branigin	1,164,620	56.18
Republican	Richard O. Ristine	901,342	43.48
Prohibition	Chester G. Bohannon	5,771	0.28
Socialist Labor	Gordon A. Long	1,182	0.06

1968 Indiana gubernatorial election
Party	Candidate	Votes	%
Republican	Edgar Whitcomb	1,080,271	52.72
Democratic	Robert L. Rock	965,816	47.13
Prohibition	Melvin E. Hawk	2,985	0.15

== 1972–present ==
In 1972 a constitutional amendment allowing governors to serve two consecutive four-year terms was approved.

1972 Indiana gubernatorial election
Party	Candidate	Votes	%
Republican	Otis R. Bowen	1,203,903	56.77
Democratic	Matthew E. Welsh	900,489	42.46
American Independent	Berryman S. Hurley	8,525	0.40
Peace and Freedom	Finley N. Campbell	6,278	0.30
Socialist Labor	John Marion Morris	1,652	0.08

1976 Indiana gubernatorial election
Party	Candidate	Votes	%
Republican	Otis Bowen (incumbent)	1,236,555	56.85
Democratic	Larry A. Conrad	927,243	42.63
American	Daniel P. Talbot	9,850	0.45
U.S. Labor	Samuel L. Washington	1,676	0.08

1980 Indiana gubernatorial election
Party	Candidate	Votes	%
Republican	Robert D. Orr	1,257,383	57.72
Democratic	John Hillenbrand	913,116	41.92
American	Cletis Artist	7,904	0.36

1984 Indiana gubernatorial election
Party	Candidate	Votes	%
Republican	Robert D. Orr (Incumbent)	1,146,497	52.16
Democratic	Wayne Townsend	1,036,922	47.18
American	Rockland Snyder	7,455	0.34
Libertarian	James A. Ridenour	7,114	0.32

1988 Indiana gubernatorial election
Party	Candidate	Votes	%
Democratic	Evan Bayh	1,138,574	53.2
Republican	John Mutz	1,002,207	46.8

1992 Indiana gubernatorial election
Party	Candidate	Votes	%
Democratic	Evan Bayh (incumbent)	1,382,151	62.0
Republican	Linley Pearson	822,533	36.9
New Alliance	Mary Barton	24,378	1.1

1996 Indiana gubernatorial election
Party	Candidate	Votes	%
Democratic	Frank O'Bannon	1,087,128	51.52
Republican	Stephen Goldsmith	986,982	46.78
Libertarian	Steve Dillon	35,805	1.70

2000 Indiana gubernatorial election
Party	Candidate	Votes	%
Democratic	Frank O'Bannon (incumbent)	1,232,525	56.56
Republican	David M. McIntosh	908,285	41.68
Libertarian	Andrew Horning	38,458	1.76

2004 Indiana gubernatorial election
Party	Candidate	Votes	%
Republican	Mitch Daniels	1,302,912	53.2
Democratic	Joe Kernan (incumbent)	1,113,900	45.5
Libertarian	Kenn Gividen	31,664	1.3
Majority		189,012	
Turnout		2,448,476	57

2008 Indiana gubernatorial election
Party	Candidate	Votes	%
Republican	Mitch Daniels (incumbent)	1,563,885	57.8
Democratic	Jill Long Thompson	1,082,463	40.1
Libertarian	Andy Horning	57,376	2.1
Majority		481,422	
Turnout		2,703,751	62

2012 Indiana gubernatorial election
Party	Candidate	Votes	%
Republican	Mike Pence	1,275,424	49.49
Democratic	John R. Gregg	1,200,016	46.56
Libertarian	Rupert Boneham	101,868	3.95
Turnout		2,703,751	57.81

2016 Indiana gubernatorial election
Party	Candidate	Votes	%
Republican	Eric Holcomb	1,397,396	51.4
Democratic	John R. Gregg	1,235,503	45.4
Libertarian	Rex Bell	87,025	3.20
Turnout		2,807,676	58

2020 Indiana gubernatorial election
Party	Candidate	Votes	%
Republican	Eric Holcomb (incumbent)	1,706,727	56.5
Democratic	Woody Myers	968,094	32.1
Libertarian	Donald Rainwater	345,567	11.4
Turnout		3,068,625	65

2024 Indiana gubernatorial election
Party	Candidate	Votes	%
Republican	Mike Braun	1,566,081	54.38
Democratic	Jennifer McCormick	1,183,741	41.11
Libertarian	Donald Rainwater	129,781	4.52

== Bibliography ==
- Gugin, Linda C.; St. Clair, James E, eds. (2006). The Governors of Indiana. Indianapolis, Indiana: Indiana Historical Society Press. ISBN 0-87195-196-7.
