= 1831 Indiana gubernatorial election =

- August 1, 1831
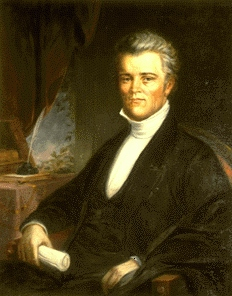

Nominee	Noah Noble	James G. Read	Milton Stapp
Popular vote	23,518	21,002	6,984
Percentage	45.61%	40.73%	13.54%
- County results Noble: 30–40% 40–50% 50–60% 60–70% 70–80% 80–90% >90% Read: 30–40% 40–50% 50–60% 60–70% 70–80% Stapp: 40–50% 50–60% Non-voting area
Governor before election
James B. Ray
Elected Governor
Noah Noble

The 1831 Indiana gubernatorial election took place on August 1, 1831, under the provisions of the Constitution of Indiana. It was the sixth gubernatorial election in the State of Indiana. Noah Noble, a former state representative from Franklin County serving since 1830 as one of the commissioners of the Michigan Road, defeated state Representative James G. Read and outgoing Lieutenant Governor Milton Stapp. The election took place concurrently with races for lieutenant governor and members of the Indiana General Assembly.

James B. Ray, the controversial incumbent governor, was term-limited and ineligible to run for a third consecutive mandate. Ray's popularity had declined precipitously following his narrow re-election in 1828. A contentious battle to shape the composition of the state supreme court left a permanent mark on his reputation, as Ray was accused of arranging judicial nominations to promote his candidacy for the United States Senate. Much of his term was consumed by efforts to establish a state system of roads and canals. The centerpiece of this system was the Michigan Road running from Madison to Logansport. Over Ray's objections, the legislature named Noble a commissioner on the project to oversee awarding contracts for completion of the road in sections. By the end of 1830 all 163 miles of the road had been let to contractors at a total cost of over $62,000, making significant progress towards the opening of the road.

Ray courted further controversy when he intervened in the case of four enslaved women of color brought into Indiana by their enslaver, William Sewell. Sewell was a Virginian traveling west when he was detained for several days in Indianapolis. Informed of their presence in a free state, the women left Sewell but were quickly retaken and brought before the circuit court on a writ of habeas corpus. Ray testified on the women's behalf, arguing that Sewell had forfeited all legal claim to his so-called property by traveling voluntarily to a free state. Judge Bethuel Morris concurred with Ray, ruling in favor of the women's freedom. Ray's testimony prompted severe rebuke from members of the state legislature. In 1831, the state adopted legislation to limit the migration of free people of color into Indiana, requiring that every African American resident post a $500 bond upon their arrival in the state and register with the local courts. Ray supported the legislation, wishing both to preserve Indiana's status as a free state and to forestall large-scale Black migration.

As early as 1830, Noble and Stapp were mentioned as likely candidates to succeed Ray. As both men were outspoken Anti-Jacksonians, Jacksonians in the state sought to nominate their own candidate, eventually settling on Read. As in the previous election, the intrusion of national parties in state politics was a contentious issue. Internal improvements were a major issue in the campaign, as was slavery. Noble was criticized for using his office as contract commissioner for the Michigan Road to promote his campaign and for facilitating an illegal slave sale eleven years earlier. He nevertheless defeated Read by a narrow margin of 2,500 votes, with Stapp finishing a distant third.

This was the last gubernatorial election before the introduction of formal party organizations in Indiana. While Read's candidacy originated with a gathering of Jacksonian lawmakers, both the candidates and affiliated newspapers denied the election was a partisan contest. Although Andrew Jackson had handily carried Indiana in the most recent presidential election and remained popular in the state, the outspokenly Anti-Jacksonian Noble defeated Read even despite a rival Anti-Jacksonian in the race. Historians Dorothy Riker and Gayle Thornbrough assign no party labels to the candidates.

== Candidates ==
=== Anti-Jacksonian candidacies ===
Before the end of 1830, Noble and Stapp were being openly spoken of as candidates for governor in the approaching election. Stapp had narrowly won the 1828 election for lieutenant governor, defeating Jacksonian Abel C. Pepper by 633 votes out of 35,157 cast. While Noble had previously been elected to the state House of Representatives from Franklin County, his most recent service was as contract commissioner for the Michigan Road. Both men announced their candidacies in the pages of the Indiana Journal, a partisan Anti-Jacksonian paper.

In early March 1831, James Scott, who for more than a decade had served as one of the original justices of the state supreme court, asked that his name be put forward as a candidate for governor. Scott had been at the center of a dispute between outgoing Governor Ray and the Indiana Senate over the composition of the court, with Ray resisting senators' calls to renominate Scott and fellow Justice Jesse Lynch Holman for a third consecutive seven-year term. Ray was accused of leveraging the appointments to promote his candidacy for the United States Senate, while Ray charged that the senate had acted improperly by attempting to dictate the actions of the executive. Scott ultimately was not nominated, and his term expired at the end of 1830.

=== Jacksonian candidacies ===
As early as January 1830, Indiana Jacksonians planned to bring forward their own candidate in opposition to Noble and Stapp. A gathering of Jacksonian lawmakers and public officials late in the year nominated John Tipton for governor and Read for lieutenant governor. Tipton was a prominent man and outspoken supporter of Jackson, a federal Indian agent, local politician, had served in the War of 1812, and represented Harrison, Crawford, and Floyd counties in the Indiana House of Representatives. In a letter dated December 18, state Representative Joseph Holman informed Tipton of the nominations, though no notice appeared in published accounts of the meeting. Tipton, however, apparently had little interest in the governorship, for he neither acknowledged nor announced his candidacy, possibly because he hoped to be elected to the United States Senate when the legislature met in 1831. In May, Jacksonians, apparently having given up on Tipton, began urging voters to support Read as the candidate for governor in the pages of the Indiana Democrat.

== Campaign ==
The role of national parties in the gubernatorial campaign was as controversial as it had been in 1828. The lack of party labels made it possible for candidates to deny accusations of partisanship even while campaigning for votes on a partisan basis among their own supporters. As his candidacy had originated with an 1830 gathering of Jacksonian officeholders, Read was denounced in the opposition press as a caucus candidate, by implication a careerist and a partisan. Noble was ridiculed for campaigning as an independent among Jacksonians and as a supporter of Henry Clay among Anti-Jacksonians. While Read publicly aligned himself with the Jackson administration, he stopped short of a direct appeal for partisanship, a boundary the Jackson state central committee did not observe.

As the election neared, Noble and Read quickly emerged as the major contenders, as Stapp and the other candidates fell behind. Both candidates were criticized for using their official positions to promote their candidacies: Noble was still serving as contract commissioner for the Michigan Road, while Read had been appointed receiver of the federal land office at Jeffersonville. Read came under scrutiny for allegedly using the United States Postal Service to distribute campaign materials at public expense, but denied personal involvement. Noble's surrogates relied on characterizations of Jacksonians as craven office-seekers, referring to the spoils system, of which Noble had been a victim.

=== Internal improvements ===
The American System and proposed state system of roads and canals were major issues in the campaign. Both candidates identified themselves as strongly in favor of internal improvements and a protective tariff. Read argued that projects of national importance should be funded federally, while "local" projects were the provenance of the states. Whereas Noble explicitly endorsed the existing federal tariff, Read carefully expressed support for a "moderate" tariff but avoided committing himself to the Tariff of Abominations, which many Jacksonians still opposed.

=== Slavery ===
Noble was a native Virginian and both his father and his father-in-law had owned slaves. When he migrated to Indiana, he brought with him an enslaved woman given to him by his father-in-law and held her at Brookville, Indiana for several days before returning her to slavery in Kentucky. In 1820 he sold the woman at his father-in-law's direction. In light of the circuit court's 1829 ruling in the Sewall case, viz. that an enslaved person intentionally brought into a free state by their enslaver becomes free the moment their feet touch free soil, antislavery critics charged that Noble had illegally sold a free woman back into bondage. Noble countered that he had never intended to keep the woman in Indiana, and had only stopped in Brookville for a couple of days before continuing on to Kentucky, whereas Sewall had entered Indiana with the intent of settling in the free states with his slaves.

The controversy exhibits the complexity of slavery as an issue in Indiana politics. Historian Matthew Salafia suggests the incident is evidence that candidates' "antislavery credentials" remained important in 1831, continuing from the territorial period. Accused of facilitating an illegal slave sale, Noble responded quickly to clarify his intent had not been to introduce slavery to Indiana in violation of the state's constitution. Yet Noble did not deny the sale itself, suggesting by implication the issue for voters was a desire to keep slavery (and African Americans) out of Indiana, and not a general concern for the welfare of Black people. In the August election, Noble was able to carry several traditionally antislavery eastern counties, including counties with large Quaker populations. Salafia argues this is evidence that Noble's popularity was ultimately unaffected by the controversy.

== Results ==
Noble defeated Read by a narrow margin of roughly 2,500 votes, less than Ray's plurality in the closely contested election of 1828. He performed strongest in eastern and central Indiana, while Read's strength lay in the southwestern counties along the Ohio River. Stapp finished a distant third, with 13% of the vote and three counties; Scott, who had withdrawn from the race prior to the election, received 61 votes, while Robert Hanna (who would shortly be appointed to the United States Senate, replacing Noble's late elder brother, James Noble) received one vote.

Despite the candidates' claims to nonpartisanship, the election indicated the strength of Indiana Anti-Jacksonians in downballot races, as opponents of Jackson succeeded in electing David Wallace to succeed Stapp as lieutenant governor and kept their majority in the state legislature. In general, Noble did better in counties that supported John Quincy Adams in 1828 but still received significant Jacksonian support, while Read did better in counties which had supported Jackson.

1831 Indiana gubernatorial election
Party	Candidate	Votes	%
Nonpartisan	Noah Noble	23,518	45.61%
Nonpartisan	James Gray Read	21,002	40.73%
Nonpartisan	Milton Stapp	6,984	13.54%
Nonpartisan	James Scott	61	0.12%
Nonpartisan	Robert Hanna	1	0.00%
Total votes		51,566	100.00%

=== Results by county ===
	Noah Noble		James G. Read		Milton Stapp		James Scott		Robert Hanna		County total
County	Votes	Percent	Votes	Percent	Votes	Percent	Votes	Percent	Votes	Percent	Votes
Allen	193	92.79	9	4.33	6	2.88	—		—		208
Bartholomew	407	43.81	211	22.71	311	33.48	—		—		929
Boone	58	33.33	100	57.47	16	9.20	—		—		174
Carroll	171	53.94	142	44.79	4	1.26	—		—		317
Cass	191	86.82	29	13.18	—		—		—		220
Clark	439	27.64	931	58.63	218	13.73	—		—		1,588
Clay	56	21.62	114	44.02	89	34.36	—		—		259
Clinton	150	76.14	38	19.29	9	4.57	—		—		197
Crawford	312	58.88	180	33.96	38	7.17	—		—		530
Daviess	298	36.21	503	61.12	22	2.67	—		—		823
Dearborn	675	34.74	1,000	51.47	268	13.79	—		—		1,943
Decatur	681	68.93	241	24.39	66	6.68	—		—		988
Delaware	92	30.16	71	23.28	142	46.56	—		—		305
Dubois	35	10.97	241	75.55	43	13.48	—		—		319
Elkhart	159	87.36	21	11.54	2	1.10	—		—		182
Fayette	637	44.42	690	48.12	107	7.46	—		—		1,434
Floyd	347	36.99	466	49.68	125	13.33	—		—		938
Fountain	578	46.02	622	49.52	56	4.46	—		—		1,256
Franklin	820	68.16	306	25.44	77	6.40	—		—		1,203
Gibson	399	48.01	425	51.14	7	0.84	—		—		831
Grant	102	93.58	7	6.42	—		—		—		109
Greene	194	29.31	432	65.26	28	4.23	8	1.21	—		662
Hamilton	232	77.33	33	11.00	35	11.67	—		—		300
Hancock	149	54.38	112	40.86	13	4.74	—		—		274
Harrison	762	62.36	192	15.71	268	21.93	—		—		1,222
Hendricks	26	6.63	311	79.34	55	14.03	—		—		392
Henry	803	73.33	275	25.11	17	1.55	—		—		1,095
Jackson	316	43.34	404	55.42	9	1.23	—		—		729
Jefferson	130	7.92	529	32.24	982	59.84	—		—		1,641
Jennings	200	28.65	218	31.23	280	40.11	—		—		698
Johnson	276	39.32	213	30.34	213	30.34	—		—		702
Knox	399	42.04	420	44.26	130	13.70	—		—		949
Lawrence	661	55.78	416	35.11	104	8.78	4	0.34	—		1,185
Madison	357	79.87	84	18.79	6	1.34	—		—		447
Marion	624	48.94	422	33.10	228	17.88	—		1	0.08	1,275
Martin	69	21.84	158	50.00	89	28.16	—		—		316
Monroe	260	24.51	769	72.48	32	3.02	—		—		1,061
Montgomery	280	28.43	391	39.70	309	31.37	5	0.51	—		985
Morgan	437	55.46	335	42.51	16	2.03	—		—		788
Orange	339	35.57	588	61.70	23	2.41	3	0.31	—		953
Owen	257	40.60	348	54.98	28	4.42	—		—		633
Parke	675	52.49	508	39.50	103	8.01	—		—		1,286
Perry	213	47.54	148	33.04	87	19.42	—		—		448
Pike	172	39.63	260	59.91	2	0.46	—		—		434
Posey	370	35.92	645	62.62	15	1.46	—		—		1,030
Putnam	629	47.33	498	37.47	198	14.90	4	0.30	—		1,329
Randolph	208	42.89	139	28.66	138	28.45	—		—		485
Ripley	514	59.08	215	24.71	141	16.21	—		—		870
Rush	800	58.39	396	28.91	174	12.70	—		—		1,370
St. Joseph	111	90.24	—		12	9.76	—		—		123
Scott	176	37.05	241	50.74	58	12.21	—		—		475
Shelby	534	55.63	374	38.96	52	5.42	—		—		960
Spencer	144	39.13	218	59.24	6	1.63	—		—		368
Sullivan	146	17.70	594	72.00	53	6.42	32	3.88	—		825
Switzerland	410	41.29	350	35.25	233	23.46	—		—		993
Tippecanoe	540	50.37	498	46.46	34	3.17	—		—		1,072
Union	460	42.83	372	34.64	242	22.53	—		—		1,074
Vanderburgh	167	39.67	224	53.21	30	7.13	—		—		421
Vermillion	528	57.14	340	36.80	56	6.06	—		—		924
Vigo	797	82.93	123	12.80	41	4.27	—		—		961
Warren	303	70.30	99	22.97	24	5.57	5	1.16	—		431
Warrick	150	30.06	325	65.13	24	4.81	—		—		499
Washington	704	45.19	804	51.60	50	3.21	—		—		1,558
Wayne	1,196	46.54	634	24.67	740	28.79	—		—		2,570
TOTAL	23,518	45.61	21,002	40.73	6,984	13.54	61	0.12	1	0.0	51,566

== Bibliography ==
- Carmony, Donald Francis (1998). Indiana 1816-1850: the Pioneer Era. Indianapolis: Indiana Historical Society. ISBN 0-87195-125-8.
- Foughty, Trevor (2019). "1831 Indiana General Election Results: Governor". Capitol & Washington.
- "Noah Noble". Indiana Historical Bureau.
- Riker, Dorothy; Thornbrough, Gayle (1960). Indiana Election Returns: 1816-1851. Indiana Historical Bureau.
- Salafia, Matthew (2013). Slavery's Borderland: Slavery and Bondage Along the Ohio River. Philadelphia: University of Pennsylvania. ISBN 978-0-8122-2408-5.
- "Tipton, John: 1786-1839". Biographical Directory of the United States Congress.
