= 1834 Indiana gubernatorial election =

- August 4, 1834
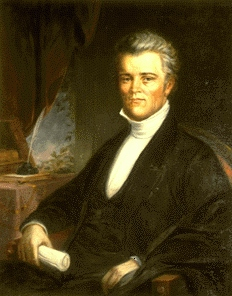

Nominee	Noah Noble	James G. Read
Party	Whig	Democratic
Popular vote	36,773	27,257
Percentage	57.43%	42.57%
- County results Noble: 50–60% 60–70% 70–80% 80–90% Read: 50–60% 60–70% 70–80% 80–90% No Vote/Data
Governor before election
Noah Noble
Nonpartisan
Elected Governor
Noah Noble
Whig

The 1834 Indiana gubernatorial election took place on August 4, 1834, under the provisions of the Constitution of Indiana. It was the seventh gubernatorial election in the State of Indiana. The incumbent Whig governor Noah Noble defeated Democratic former state representative James G. Read. The election took place concurrently with elections for lieutenant governor and members of the Indiana General Assembly. This was the first gubernatorial election in Indiana contested on a partisan basis.

Noble was elected in 1831, defeating Read and outgoing Lieutenant Governor Milton Stapp in a three-way race to succeed the retiring governor James B. Ray. In office, he aligned himself with the Anti-Jacksonian faction in state politics that in 1834 organized itself as the Whig Party. The Jacksonians, now calling themselves "Democratic Republicans" or "Democrats," nominated Read at a state convention in Indianapolis. Noble benefited from rapid population growth and economic expansion in the early 1830s that more than provided for the state's meagre expenses. He defeated Read by a convincing margin, carrying 51 of the state's 69 counties.

This was the first gubernatorial election of the Second Party System in Indiana. The preceding election of 1831, and all previous elections, had been contested on a nonpartisan basis. Both candidates campaigned personally and with gusto. Noble benefited from the support of Democrats who favored the candidacy of a Westerner such as Richard Mentor Johnson for president in 1836 as well as the united support of the Whigs. Whigs interpreted Noble's victory as foreshadowing the defeat of Martin Van Buren in the coming presidential election. (Indiana's electoral votes would in fact go to the Whig candidate, William Henry Harrison, who nevertheless lost the national election to Van Buren.)

== Nominations ==
=== Whig nomination ===
The Whig Party in Indiana grew out of the Anti-Jacksonian faction who prior to 1834 called themselves Adams or Clay men. They were sometimes called National Republicans as one faction of the Jeffersonian Republican Party that split during the contentious 1824 United States presidential election. The national Whig movement was a conglomerate of American System nationalists, Nullifiers or state rights men, and Anti-Masons opposed to the influence of secret societies that supposedly undermined republican egalitarianism. In Indiana, National Republicans were by far the largest element of the new party; the Anti-Masonic candidates had received almost no votes in the state in 1832 United States presidential election and the Nullifiers none at all.

Indiana Whigs did not hold a state convention ahead of the gubernatorial election. Noble was widely acknowledged as the favorite candidate of the Whigs but still saw benefit in maintaining the public appearance of nonpartisanship. His campaign was supported by the Whig partisan press alongside Lieutenant Governor David Wallace and the Whig legislative slate.

=== Democratic nomination ===
Delegates from forty counties met at Indianapolis on December 9, 1833, to nominate a candidate for governor. The call for a state convention of Hoosier Jacksonians had been issued by the editor of the Indiana Democrat, Alexander F. Morrison, who declared the "paramount interests" of the country demanded "concert of action" among loyal Jacksonians. Calling themselves the "Democratic Republican" convention, the gathering was the first of its kind in Indiana politics. (In earlier elections, candidates for governor had prevailed on friendly editors to place their names before the public without recourse to party conventions.) James G. Read was nominated on the second ballot with 50 out of 72 votes, defeating Jacob B. Lowe of Monroe County. Lowe then moved that the nomination be made unanimous in order to reflect the unity of Hoosier Democrats heading into the spring campaign.

Gubernatorial ballot
	1st	2nd
James G. Read	30	50
Jacob B. Lowe	20	19
Gamaliel Taylor	8	0
Jonathan McCarty	6	0
James P. Drake	5	0
John Wesley Davis	2	0
Scattering	3	3

== Campaign ==
While Noble wrote to Read in April to propose that neither candidate actively canvass votes, this agreement was largely ignored and soon forgotten. As both men were broadly in agreement on the major issues before the state, the campaign centered on issues of character. Whigs trumpeted Noble's nonpartisanship in awarding half of official appointments to members of the opposition party and savaged Read for having been nominated by a gathering of corrupt office-seekers and partisan apparatchiks. Democrats countered that Noble's first election had been secured by the influence of "political aristocrats" and party managers, contrasted with the more democratic mode of a state convention. Both parties accused the opposition of appealing for votes on a partisan basis and suggested that discerning voters would doubtless judge their candidate the more deserving choice.

== Results ==
Noble defeated Read by an overwhelming margin of more than 9,000 votes. He carried 51 counties to 18 for Read, the latter of whose support was concentrated in the southern and western part of the state. Democrats attributed Noble's victory to crossover voting stemming from the governor's personal popularity, while Whigs interpreted the results as a show of support for Whig policies.

1834 Indiana gubernatorial election
Party	Candidate	Votes	%	±%
Whig	Noah Noble (incumbent)	36,773	57.43%	+11.82
Democratic	James Gray Read	27,257	42.57%	+1.84
Independent	Christopher Harrison	1	0.00%	
Total votes		64,031	100.00%	

=== Results by county ===
	Noah Noble Whig		James G. Read Democratic		County total
County	Votes	Percent	Votes	Percent	Votes
Allen	246	68.72	112	31.28	358
Bartholomew	657	51.01	631	48.99	1,288
Boone	244	51.80	227	48.20	471
Carroll	272	44.16	344	55.84	616
Cass	449	89.44	53	10.56	502
Clark	672	41.66	941	58.34	1,613
Clay	60	15.27	333	84.73	393
Clinton	310	63.52	178	36.48	488
Crawford	300	60.24	198	39.76	498
Daviess	338	45.68	402	54.32	740
Dearborn	1,293	55.45	1,039	44.55	2,332
Decatur	869	72.72	326	27.28	1,195
Delaware	297	64.57	163	35.43	460
Dubois	82	24.77	249	75.23	331
Elkhart (Note: The official returns do not include the votes of one township, rejected by the county clerk, where the vote was 39 for Read and 24 for Noble.)	172	59.11	119	40.89	291
Fayette	945	62.21	574	37.79	1,519
Floyd	588	66.44	297	33.56	885
Fountain	655	44.41	820	55.59	1,475
Franklin	1,061	73.43	384	26.57	1,445
Gibson	502	50.40	494	49.60	996
Grant	111	73.51	40	26.49	151
Greene	342	43.29	448	56.71	790
Hamilton	366	68.16	171	31.84	537
Hancock	295	53.15	260	46.85	555
Harrison	665	47.84	725	52.16	1,390
Hendricks	552	57.32	411	42.68	963
Henry	984	72.04	382	27.96	1,366
Huntington	257	89.55	30	10.45	287
Jackson	383	39.90	577	60.10	960
Jefferson	1,021	59.71	689	40.29	1,710
Jennings	435	57.54	321	42.46	756
Johnson	511	57.54	440	42.45	951
Knox (Note: Christopher Harrison received one vote in Knox County.)	700	61.62	435	38.29	1,136
LaGrange	97	64.24	54	35.76	151
LaPorte	328	68.62	150	31.38	478
Lawrence	618	68.62	533	31.38	1,151
Madison	532	79.64	132 (Note: 24 ballots intended for Read misspelled the candidate's name as "James B. Read" or "James C. Read" and were counted separately.)	19.76	668
Marion	1,020	56.79	776	43.21	1,796
Martin	105	25.99	299	74.01	404
Miami	70	77.78	20	22.22	90
Monroe	548	44.88	673	55.12	1,221
Montgomery	859	64.83	466	35.17	1,325
Morgan	712	54.77	488	45.23	1,300
Orange	383	35.63	692	64.37	1,075
Owen	306	44.22	386	55.78	692
Parke	687	51.23	654	48.77	1,341
Perry	325	80.65	78	19.35	403
Pike	182	39.39	280	60.61	462
Posey	415	36.47	722	63.53	1,138
Putnam	854	53.31	748	46.69	1,602
Randolph	432	75.79	138	24.21	570
Ripley	741	75.61	239	24.39	980
Rush	1,219	63.39	704	36.61	1,923
St. Joseph	348	78.03	98	21.97	446
Scott	304	51.09	291	48.91	595
Shelby	872	63.93	492	36.07	1,364
Spencer	240	59.55	163	40.45	403
Sullivan	242	28.64	603	71.36	845
Switzerland	793	72.75	297	27.25	1,090
Tippecanoe	904	60.23	597	39.77	1,501
Union	709	55.91	559	44.09	1,268
Vanderburgh	243	54.12	206	45.88	449
Vermillion	563	55.30	455	44.70	1,018
Vigo	939	76.22	293	23.78	1,232
Warren	443	68.26	206	31.74	649
Warrick	173	38.79	273	61.21	446
Washington	658	38.43	1,053	61.57	1,712
Wayne	2,225	79.38	578	20.62	2,803
White	50	64.10	28	35.90	78
TOTAL	36,773	57.43	27,257	42.57	64,031

== Bibliography ==
- Carmony, Donald Francis (1998). Indiana 1816-1850: the Pioneer Era. Indianapolis: Indiana Historical Society. ISBN 0-87195-125-8.
- Foughty, Trevor (2019). "1834 Indiana General Election Results: Governor". Capitol & Washington.
- Foughty, Trevor (2015). "A Time When Party Affiliation Didn't Matter". Capitol & Washington.
- Holt, Michael F. (1979). The Rise and Fall of the American Whig Party: Jacksonian Politics and the Onset of the Civil War. Louisiana State University.
- Riker, Dorothy; Thornbrough, Gayle (1960). Indiana Election Returns: 1816-1851. Indiana Historical Bureau.
