= Thomas M. Browne =

American politician (1829–1891)

Thomas Browne
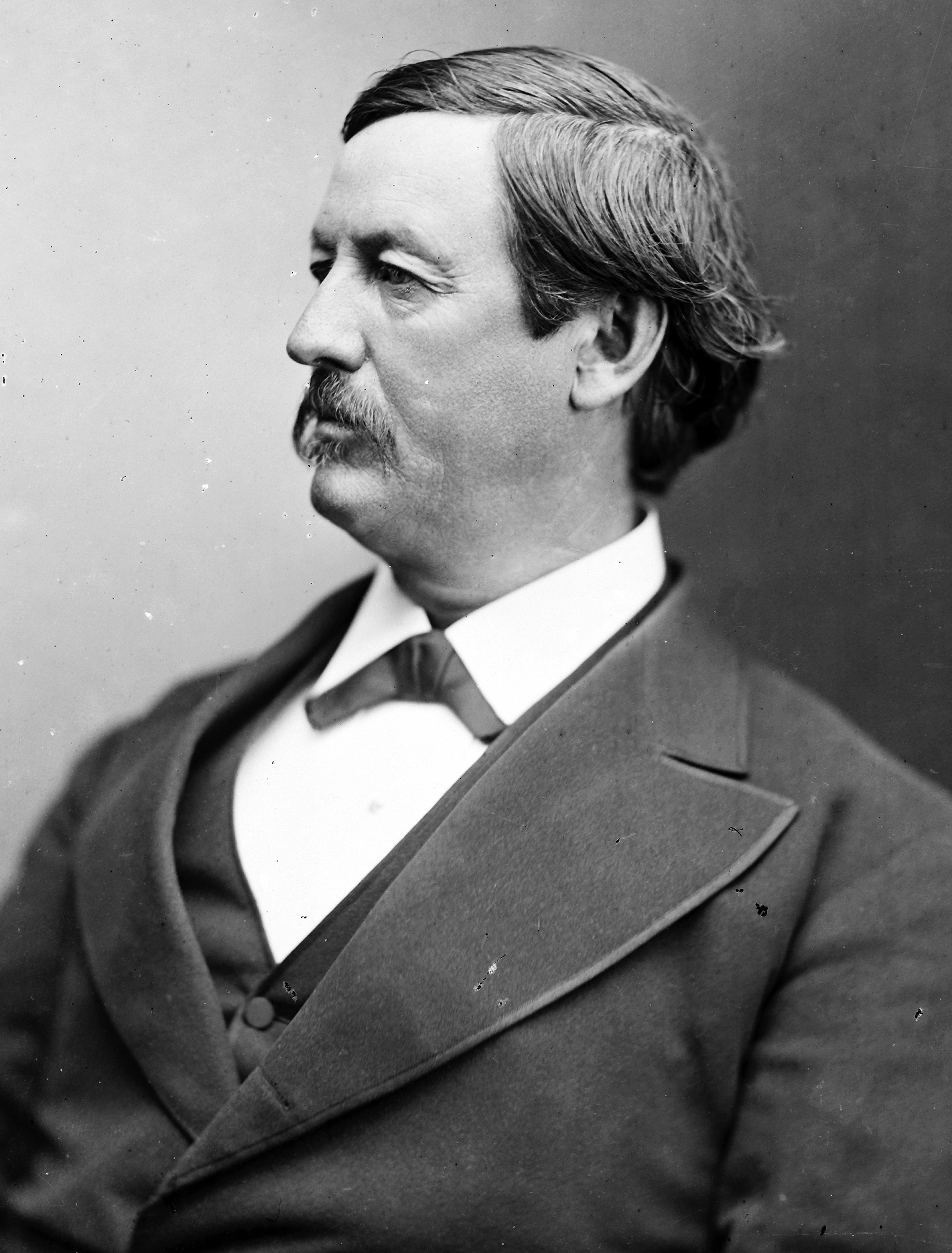

Member of the U.S. House of Representatives from Indiana
- In office March 4, 1877 – March 3, 1891
- Preceded by: William S. Holman (5th); William R. Myers (6th)
- Succeeded by: Courtland C. Matson (5th); Henry U. Johnson (6th)
- Constituency: 5th district (1877-81); 6th district (1881-91)

United States Attorney for the District of Indiana
- In office April 1869 – August 1, 1872
- Preceded by: Alfred Kilgore
- Succeeded by: Nelson Trusler

Member of the Indiana Senate
- In office 1863

Personal details
- Born: Thomas McLelland Browne; April 19, 1829 New Paris, Ohio, U.S.
- Died: July 17, 1891 (aged 62) Winchester, Indiana, U.S.
- Resting place: Fountain Park Cemetery
- Party: Republican

Military service
- Branch/service: Union Army
- Unit: 7th Indiana Cavalry Regiment
- Battles/wars: American Civil War

Thomas McLelland Browne (April 19, 1829 – July 17, 1891) was an American attorney, Civil War veteran and politician who served seven terms as a U.S. representative for Indiana's 5th and 6th congressional district in the late 19th century. He was a Republican.

== Early life and education ==
He was born in New Paris, Ohio. His mother died in 1843. Browne moved to Indiana in January 1844. He attended the common schools. He was apprenticed to a Ralph M. Pomeroy in Spartanburg. He moved to Winchester, Indiana, in 1848 to study law.

== Career ==
He studied law and was admitted to the bar in 1849 and commenced practice in Winchester. Browne was elected prosecuting attorney for the thirteenth judicial circuit in 1855 and was reelected in 1857 and 1859. He was named secretary of the Indiana Senate in 1861 and served as a member in 1863.

=== Civil War ===
Browne assisted in organizing the 7th Indiana Cavalry Regiment of the Union Army, and went to the field with that regiment as captain of Company B on August 28, 1863. He was commissioned lieutenant colonel on October 1, 1863. He was promoted to colonel on October 10, 1865, and subsequently brevetted a brigadier general to date from March 13, 1865. After the war, he mustered out of the Army on February 18, 1866.

=== Early political career ===
He was appointed United States Attorney for the District of Indiana in April 1869 and served until his resignation August 1, 1872. In 1872 he ran against Benjamin Harrison for the Republican nomination for governor of Indiana. He won the nomination but was defeated in the general election by the Democratic candidate, Thomas A. Hendricks. He served as a delegate to the 1876 Republican National Convention.

=== Congress ===
Browne was elected as a Republican to the House of Representatives, where he served from March 4, 1877, to March 3, 1891. He served as chairman of the Committee on Invalid Pensions (Forty-seventh Congress), Committee on Revision of the Laws (Fifty-first Congress). He was not a candidate for renomination in 1890.

== Death ==
Browne died in Winchester, Indiana, on July 17, 1891. He was interred in Fountain Park Cemetery.

Party political offices
Preceded by Conrad Baker	Republican nominee for Governor of Indiana; 1872	Succeeded by Benjamin Harrison
