= Stephen Stevens =

American judge (1793–1870)

Justice of the Indiana Supreme Court
- In office January 28, 1831 – May 30, 1836
- Appointed by: James B. Ray
- Preceded by: James Scott
- Succeeded by: Charles Dewey

Stephen C. Stevens (c. 1793 – November 7, 1870) was an American judge, lawyer, politician, and abolitionist who served in the Indiana House of Representatives, the Indiana Senate, and as a Justice on the Indiana Supreme Court.

== Biography ==
=== Early life and education ===
Born in Kentucky in about 1793, Stevens moved to Brookville, Indiana sometime before 1812.

In Brookville, Stevens worked a variety of jobs, including as a tavern keeper and merchant. While working as a shopkeeper, he was indicted for selling a tin pan to a Native American but the indictment was eventually quashed.

Stevens traveled to New Orleans on business in 1814, during the War of 1812. Stevens ended up joining American soldiers under General Andrew Jackson, serving in the now-famous Battle of New Orleans. During the battle Stevens was wounded in the head by a musket ball, an injury which would trouble him for the rest of his life.

=== Political career, judicial service, and later life ===
Stevens returned to Brookville after the war and began studying law, being admitted to the Indiana bar in 1817. Also in 1817, he represented Franklin County in the Indiana General Assembly. During this brief first stint in the General Assembly, the famously short-tempered Stevens began a legal squabble with James Noble (one of Indiana's U.S. Senators at the time) which ended with the Franklin County Circuit Court fining both men five-hundred dollars.

Stevens moved to Vevay, Indiana in 1817, where he helped to organize a local branch of the state bank. Stevens would serve as the branch's president until the bank failed, whereupon he returned to practicing law.

Stevens returned to the state legislature in 1823, when he represented Switzerland County in the Indiana House of Representatives. In 1824, Stevens became Speaker of Indiana House of Representatives before leaving the General Assembly again. He returned to represent Switzerland County in the House once more from 1826 to 1827. In 1828, he was elected to the Indiana Senate. He would serve as a senator until he was appointed to the Indiana Supreme Court by Governor James B. Ray.

Stevens served as a Justice of Indiana Supreme Court from 1831, succeeding the retiring Justice James Scott. In 1836, Stevens resigned from the court to open a law office in Madison, Indiana. He was succeeded by Justice Charles Dewey.

Stevens was a prominent abolitionist, opposing and criticizing slavery throughout his life. He represented African Americans in court several times. A resolution he drafted calling for the emancipation of slaves was later adopted by the New School Presbyterian Synod. Additionally, Stevens was the candidate of the abolitionist Liberty Party during the 1846 Indiana gubernatorial election.

=== Personal life and death ===
Stevens was a Freemason and helped to found a local Masonic temple in Brookville in 1817. However, Stevens gave up Freemasonry when public opinion in the United States turned against the Masons following the widely publicized disappearance of William Morgan.

Stevens would amass considerable wealth during his lucrative career as a collections attorney. However, he would lose all of his money following an unsuccessful investment in the burgeoning railroad industry in 1851 and 1852. After losing his fortune, Stevens began to suffer from insanity and became deeply delusional. He was admitted to the Indiana Hospital for the Insane in Indianapolis. After an old friend, John Test, visited Stevens in the hospital and reported to Governor Conrad Baker about the former justice's poor mental state, Baker and his associates raised money to have a suit tailored and gifted to Stevens to commemorate his long and successful career in law. Stevens was moved by the present and gave a speech thanking those who gifted it to him. Days later, on November 7, 1870, Stevens died at the hospital at age 77.

Political offices
Preceded by James Scott	Justice of the Indiana Supreme Court; 1831-1836	Succeeded by Charles Dewey
