= 1828 Indiana gubernatorial election =

- August 4, 1828
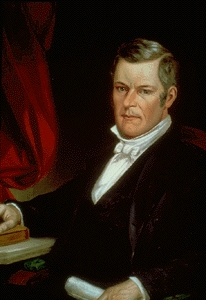

Nominee	James B. Ray	Israel T. Canby	Harbin H. Moore
Popular vote	15,131	12,251	10,898
Percentage	39.53%	32.00%	28.47%
- County results Ray: 30–40% 40–50% 50–60% 60–70% 70–80% 80–90% Canby: 30–40% 40–50% 50–60% 60–70% 70–80% Moore: 30–40% 40–50% 50–60% Tie Non-voting area
Governor before election
James B. Ray
Elected Governor
James B. Ray

The 1828 Indiana gubernatorial election took place on August 4, 1828, under the provisions of the Constitution of Indiana. It was the fifth gubernatorial election in the State of Indiana. James B. Ray, the incumbent governor, was re-elected, defeating Israel T. Canby, the former state senator representing Jefferson and Jennings counties, and Harbin H. Moore, the outgoing speaker of the Indiana House of Representatives, in a three-way race. The election took place concurrently with races for lieutenant governor and members of the Indiana General Assembly.

Ray won the 1825 Indiana gubernatorial election after succeeding to the governorship upon the resignation of William Hendricks, who had stepped down to accept a seat in the United States Senate. From the beginning, his tenure was controversial: opponents alleged Ray was yet shy of the minimum age of thirty years when he took the oath of office, and his ascension as such had been unconstitutional. (In fact, Ray turned thirty a few days after his inauguration, but continued to serve as governor regardless.) Following his re-election to a full term in August 1825, Ray attempted to steer a middle course between the emerging Jacksonian and Anti-Jacksonian factions in federal politics. His independent stance attracted criticisms from both camps, as did his acceptance of a federal commission in 1826 to negotiate the Treaty of Mississinewas, which appeared to violate the constitutional prohibition against governors serving in federal employ during their tenure in office. The General Assembly debated whether Ray had forfeited his office by accepting the commission, and separately, whether he had neglected his duties by absenting himself from the capital for long periods. Indiana State Treasurer Samuel Merrill attacked Ray publicly, alleging the governor to be "destitute of principle and all sense of propriety," and accusing him of embezzling public funds. Ultimately, an investigative committee found no evidence of wrongdoing, and a resolution calling for Ray's removal was defeated in the House by a vote of 31 to 27.

For the first time, presidential politics played a significant role in the gubernatorial election. The 1828 United States presidential election pitted President John Quincy Adams against challenger Andrew Jackson four years after Adams narrowly bested Jackson in a hard-fought campaign that had to be decided by the U.S. House of Representatives. Partisan allegiances were in flux; attempting to remain above the fray, Ray faced opposition from supporters of both Adams and Jackson, the former calling themselves "National Republicans" or "Adams men," the latter "Democratic Republicans," "Jacksonians," or "Democrats." Canby and Moore were known to favor Jackson and Adams, respectively, in the national election, and Canby in particular sought to nationalize the race by campaigning for votes on the basis of his Jacksonian credentials; however, there were no formal party nominations, and Ray himself deliberately avoided stating a presidential preference, writing "the Governor has nothing to do in making a president." While some partisan behavior by voters is discernible, Ray drew support from both "Adams" and "Jackson" men, and boasted afterwards that he "was not elected by the friends of either side in a party controversy." Historian Donald Carmony sees the election as showing some evidence of national party activity while retaining the regional and personal politics of early elections; Dorothy Riker and Gayle Thornbrough classify the candidates as non-partisan.

== Candidates ==
Opposition to Ray's re-election abounded as the 1828 election came into view. The dispute with Merrill, while acrimonious, remained personal in nature, and failed to mobilize the public against him. Far more damaging was Ray's studied neutrality in the brewing rematch between Adams and Jackson. For the first time since 1816, (when Indiana's electoral votes were awarded by the state legislature,) the presidential and gubernatorial contests would occur in the same year. Supporters of Adams and Jackson held their presidential preference in mind as they considered the candidates for governor. Attempting to appeal to both factions, Ray pleased neither. His position attracted rivals from across the political spectrum, and Ray had to endure attacks from both Jacksonians and Anti-Jacksonians throughout the campaign.

=== Adams (Anti-Jacksonian) candidacies ===
Ray feared a challenger backed by supporters of President Adams would split the electorate along partisan lines. In 1824 he had supported Henry Clay for president but preferred Jackson over Adams in the ensuing contingent election in the House of Representatives. While the 1825 gubernatorial election had not been fought along partisan lines, Ray's opponent in that contest, Chief Justice Isaac Blackford, was a known "Adams man." Blackford, Lieutenant Governor John H. Thompson, and Speaker Moore were each proposed as potential candidates for governor in the winter of 1827–28. All three were known to favor Adams in the approaching presidential election; Moore had actually been a delegate to the Adams State Convention in January 1828 that nominated a slate of electors pledged to Adams and adopted a platform defending the policies of the administration.

Thompson was the leading candidate against Ray until early April, when Moore's candidacy began to pick up steam. No candidate was ever formally endorsed as the "Adams" or "National Republican" nominee for governor, though Moore's presidential preference was known publicly and remarked on in the strategic considerations of the rival Jacksonians.

=== Jacksonian candidacies ===
Israel Canby emerged as the early favorite among Jacksonians in 1828; a physician and member of the state senate from Madison, he had been a delegate to the Jackson State Conventions of 1824 and 1828. When the 1828 convention adjourned, some Jacksonians went away with the understanding that Canby had been nominated for governor. Canby, however, had determined to withdraw his candidacy for personal considerations.

In early May, as it became apparent Ray would be opposed in the gubernatorial election by an Adams man, the Jackson State Committee saw fit to approach the governor with the offer of an endorsement. Ray wrote in reply that the committee could "dispose of me and my name as you in your wisdom see fit," that he would not commit himself to either candidate for president but would nonetheless welcome "the united support of the Jacksonians" in the August election. He asked only that Jacksonian support, were it forthcoming, remain private until after the election to avoid any appearance of partisanship. Subsequent events would cause Canby to re-enter the race in early July with less than a month left in the campaign.

== Campaign ==
Twelve years after statehood, Indiana was still a frontier state, and enthusiasm for internal improvements was unanimous and bipartisan. In his address to the electorate, Canby declared himself a supporter of the American System of protectionism and federal infrastructure spending; Ray similarly praised the economic policies of the Adams Administration and as governor had overseen the acquisition by treaty of land for the Michigan Road.

The Jacksonians sought to make an issue of the upcoming presidential election, which due to the staggered electoral calendar would be held in November, two months after the gubernatorial contest. In the address announcing his candidacy, Canby described the choice between Adams and Jackson as one of principle rather than personality: Jackson's defeat in the 1825 contingent election, despite a plurality of both the popular vote and the electoral college in his favor, was an affront to the right of the people to elect the president. Despite intense pressure to declare a preference, Ray remained steadfastly neutral in the presidential contest, decrying the spirit of partisanship endemic in state politics.

Campaigning was conducted, not only by sympathetic editors in the press, but by the candidates themselves. Ray conducted a tour of ten counties in the company of U.S. Representative Thomas H. Blake, addressing crowds in Brookville, Lawrenceburg and Vincennes. Ray's incumbency was an asset to his campaign, as he was better known to the public than either Canby or Moore, who could not rival the governor's long-established reputation.

=== Augustus Jocelyn interview ===
In June the pro-Adams editor of the Brookville Repository, Augustus Jocelyn, published an interview with Ray that dealt a severe blow to the governor's budding alliance with the Jacksonians. Jocelyn quoted Ray as denying the 1824 presidential election had been stolen from Jackson and denouncing the Jackson party as "an outrageous and violent faction" which it was "the duty of every good man" to oppose. In response, the Jackson State Committee cut all ties with Ray and published in full their previous correspondence, and Canby, his private business now concluded, re-emerged as a candidate for governor.

Carmony describes Ray's defense of the interview and his reply to the Jacksonian accusations against him as characteristically "lengthy and meandering." Professing to admire Adams and Jackson equally, Ray declared he would "be governed by measures and not men" and flatly denied the relevance of presidential politics in the gubernatorial election. His alliance with the Jackson party had been only prospective, in the event the Adams faction were to mount a partisan campaign against him; as for his description of Jacksonians as "outrageous and violent," Ray said, the remark was entirely Jocelyn's invention.

== Results ==
Ray defeated his two opponents less than 40% of the statewide vote, polling strongest in the counties of the Whitewater Valley. Canby's support came mostly from southern counties that would go on to favor Jackson in the October presidential election, as well as Terre Haute, while Moore carried a total of nine counties along the periphery of the state.

The relationship between presidential party identity and voter behavior in the gubernatorial election is ambiguous. Carmony writes that while the election results show some degree of correlation between presidential preference and gubernatorial politics, "local and personal preferences remained strong." Ray carried thirty-two counties, winning votes from both Jacksonians and Anti-Jacksonians in equal numbers. Despite this, he became the first governor to be elected with less than a majority of the votes.

1828 Indiana gubernatorial election
Party	Candidate	Votes	%	±%
Nonpartisan	James B. Ray (incumbent)	15,131	39.53%	−13.71%
Nonpartisan	Israel Thompson Canby	12,251	32.00%	
Nonpartisan	Harbin H. Moore	10,898	28.47%	
Total votes		38,280	100.00%	

=== Results by county ===
	James B. Ray		Israel T. Canby		Harbin H. Moore		County total
County	Votes	Percent	Votes	Percent	Votes	Percent	
Allen	43	31.85%	14	10.37%	78	57.78%	135
Bartholomew	233	37.28%	178	28.48%	214	34.24%	625
Carroll	8	6.56%	77	63.11%	37	30.33%	122
Clark	335	23.83%	716	50.92%	355	25.25%	1,406
Clay	47	42.34%	29	26.13%	35	31.53%	111
Crawford	170	35.49%	33	6.89%	276	57.62%	479
Daviess	337	57.12%	123	20.85%	130	22.03%	590
Dearborn	846	40.13%	674	31.97%	588	27.89%	2,108
Decatur	446	63.71%	127	18.14%	127	18.14%	700
Delaware	45	37.50%	34	28.33%	41	34.17%	120
Dubois	161	61.22%	84	31.94%	18	6.84%	263
Fayette	613	51.86%	342	28.93%	227	19.20%	1,182
Floyd	156	21.79%	409	57.12%	151	21.09%	716
Fountain	114	22.22	258	50.29%	141	27.48%	513
Franklin	512	38.73%	237	17.93%	573	43.34%	1,322
Gibson	19	3.21%	357	60.41%	215	36.38%	591
Greene	188	34.37%	188	34.37%	171	31.26%	547
Hamilton	147	63.36%	11	4.74%	74	31.90%	232
Hancock	83	78.30%	2	1.89%	21	19.81%	106
Harrison	350	26.50%	203	15.37%	768	58.14%	1,321
Hendricks	103	61.68%	—		64	38.32%	167
Henry	470	82.46%	37	6.49%	63	11.05%	570
Jackson	33	5.12%	355	55.12%	256	39.75%	644
Jefferson	628	42.03%	506	33.87%	360	24.10%	1,494
Jennings	394	77.41%	41	8.06%	74	14.54%	509
Johnson	258	62.32%	69	16.67%	87	21.01%	414
Knox	390	44.62%	326	37.30%	158	18.08%	874
Lawrence	196	18.74%	755	72.18%	95	9.08%	1,046
Madison	126	69.23%	6	3.30%	50	27.47	182
Marion	600	65.57%	56	6.12%	259	28.31%	915
Martin	111	36.27%	103	33.66%	92	30.07%	306
Monroe	168	20.95%	536	66.83%	98	12.22%	802
Montgomery	142	31.21%	235	51.65%	78	17.14%	455
Morgan	327	58.81%	92	16.55%	137	24.64%	556
Orange	41	4.33%	570	60.25%	335	35.41%	946
Owen	204	49.88%	60	14.67%	145	35.45%	409
Parke	218	32.63%	278	41.62%	172	25.75%	668
Perry	279	62.98%	36	8.13%	128	28.89%	443
Pike	110	39.29%	73	26.07%	97	34.64%	280
Posey	64	8.04%	524	65.83%	208	26.13%	796
Putnam	279	37.50%	192	25.81%	273	36.69%	744
Randolph	93	27.35%	116	34.12%	131	38.53%	340
Ripley	371	57.08%	75	11.34%	204	31.38%	650
Rush	500	46.64%	241	22.48%	331	30.88%	1,072
Scott	249	59.14%	58	13.78%	114	27.08%	421
Shelby	170	25.15%	256	37.87%	250	36.98%	676
Spencer	236	66.11%	60	16.81%	61	17.09%	357
Sullivan	105	17.47%	314	52.25%	182	30.28%	601
Switzerland	316	34.05%	393	42.35%	219	23.60%	928
Tippecanoe (Note: The returns from Randolph Township, Tippecanoe County were rejected on grounds they had been improperly prepared.)	105	40.08%	70	26.72%	87	33.21%	262
Union	343	34.54%	281	28.30%	369	37.16%	993
Vanderburgh	43	14.43%	99	33.22%	156	52.35%	298
Vermillion	177	37.18%	106	22.27%	193	40.55%	476
Vigo	225	34.14%	76	11.53%	358	54.32%	659
Warren	64	54.24%	34	28.81%	20	16.95%	118
Warrick	50	14.58%	217	63.27%	76	22.16%	343
Washington	531	34.68%	504	32.92%	496	32.40%	1,531
Wayne	1,559	72.14%	434	20.08%	168	7.78%	2,161
TOTAL	15,131	39.53%	12,251	32.00%	10,898	28.47%	38,280

== Bibliography ==
- Carmony, Donald Francis (1998). Indiana 1816-1850: the Pioneer Era. Indianapolis: Indiana Historical Society. ISBN 0-87195-125-8.
- Foughty, Trevor (2019). "1828 Indiana General Election Results: Governor". Capitol & Washington.
- "Indiana Governor James Brown Ray (1794 - 1848)". Indiana Historical Bureau. December 15, 2020.
- Leonard, Adam (1923). "Personal Politics in Indiana 1816-1840". Indiana Magazine of History. 19 (3): 241–81.
- Riker, Dorothy; Thornbrough, Gayle (1960). Indiana Election Returns: 1816-1851. Indiana Historical Bureau.
