= Raymond S. Springer =

American politician

Raymond Smiley Springer
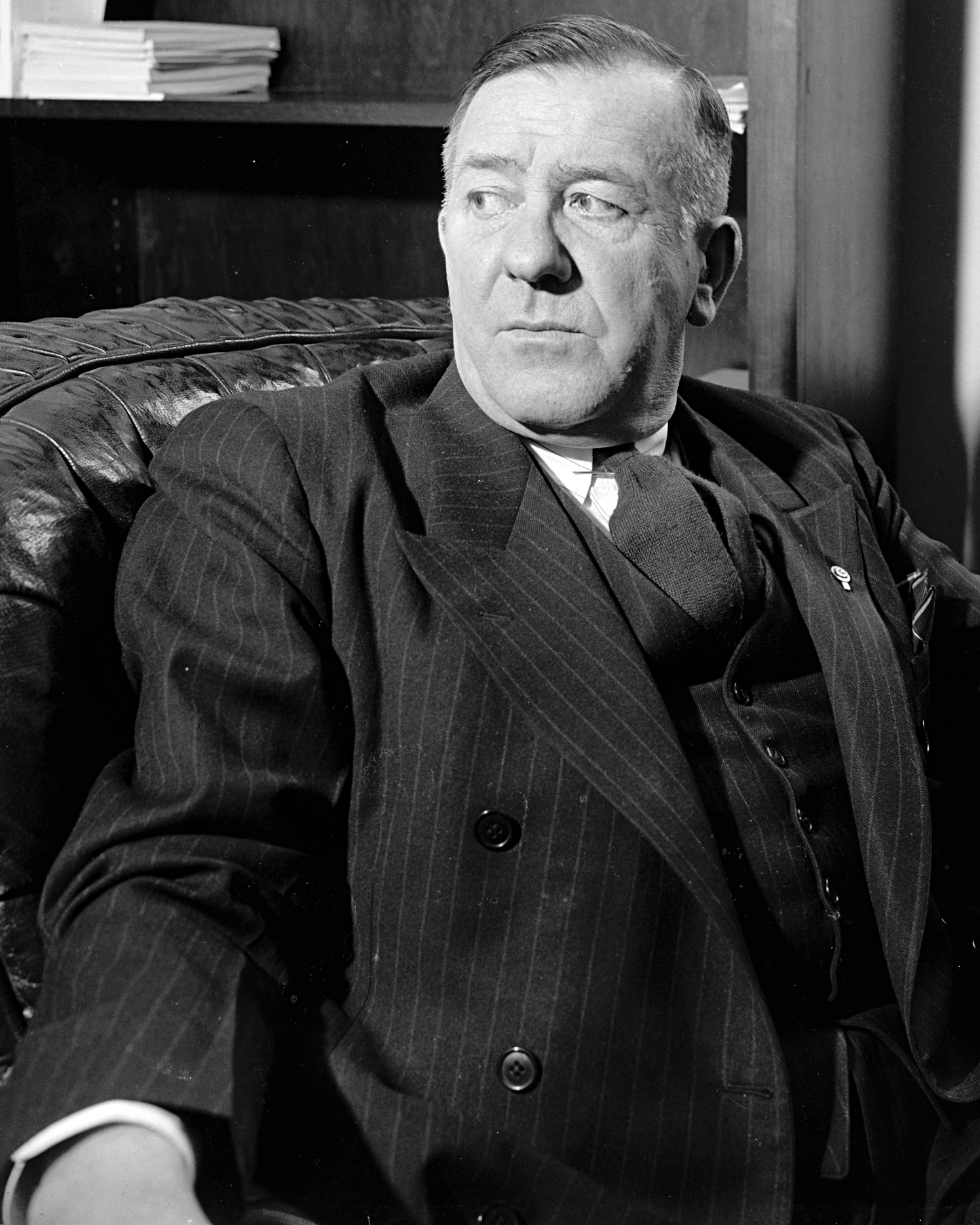

Member of the U.S. House of Representatives from Indiana's 10th district
- In office January 3, 1939 – August 28, 1947
- Preceded by: Finly H. Gray
- Succeeded by: Ralph Harvey

Personal details
- Born: April 26, 1882 Indiana, U.S.
- Died: August 28, 1947 (aged 65) Connersville, Indiana, U.S
- Party: Republican

Military service
- Allegiance: United States of America
- Branch/service: United States Navy
- Rank: Captain
- Unit: 84th Division
- Battles/wars: World War I

Raymond Smiley Springer (April 26, 1882 – August 28, 1947) was an American attorney and jurist who served as a member of the U.S. House of Representatives from Indiana from 1939 to 1947.

== Biography ==
Born on a farm in Rush County, near Dunreith, Indiana, Springer attended the public schools, Earlham College, Richmond, Indiana, and Butler University, Indianapolis, Indiana. He was graduated from the Indiana Law School at Indianapolis in 1904. He was admitted to the bar in 1904 and commenced practice in Connersville, Indiana. He served as County attorney of Fayette County, Indiana from 1908 to 1914.

He served as judge of the 37th Judicial Circuit of Indiana 1916–1922.

During the First World War served as a Captain of Infantry, 84th Division, in 1918. He served as Lieutenant Colonel of the Officers' Reserve Corps 1918–1946. He was an unsuccessful candidate for Governor of Indiana in 1932 and 1936.

=== Congress ===
Springer was elected as a Republican to the Seventy-sixth and to the four succeeding Congresses and served from January 3, 1939, until his death in Connersville, Indiana, August 28, 1947. He was interred in Dale Cemetery.

== See also ==
- List of members of the United States Congress who died in office (1900–1949)

Party political offices
Preceded by Harry G. Leslie	Republican nominee for Governor of Indiana; 1932, 1936	Succeeded by Glenn R. Hillis
U.S. House of Representatives
Preceded by Finly H. Gray	Member of the U.S. House of Representatives from Indiana's 10th congressional district 1939 – 1947	Succeeded by Ralph Harvey
