= 1840 Indiana gubernatorial election =

- August 3, 1840
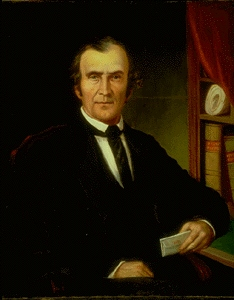

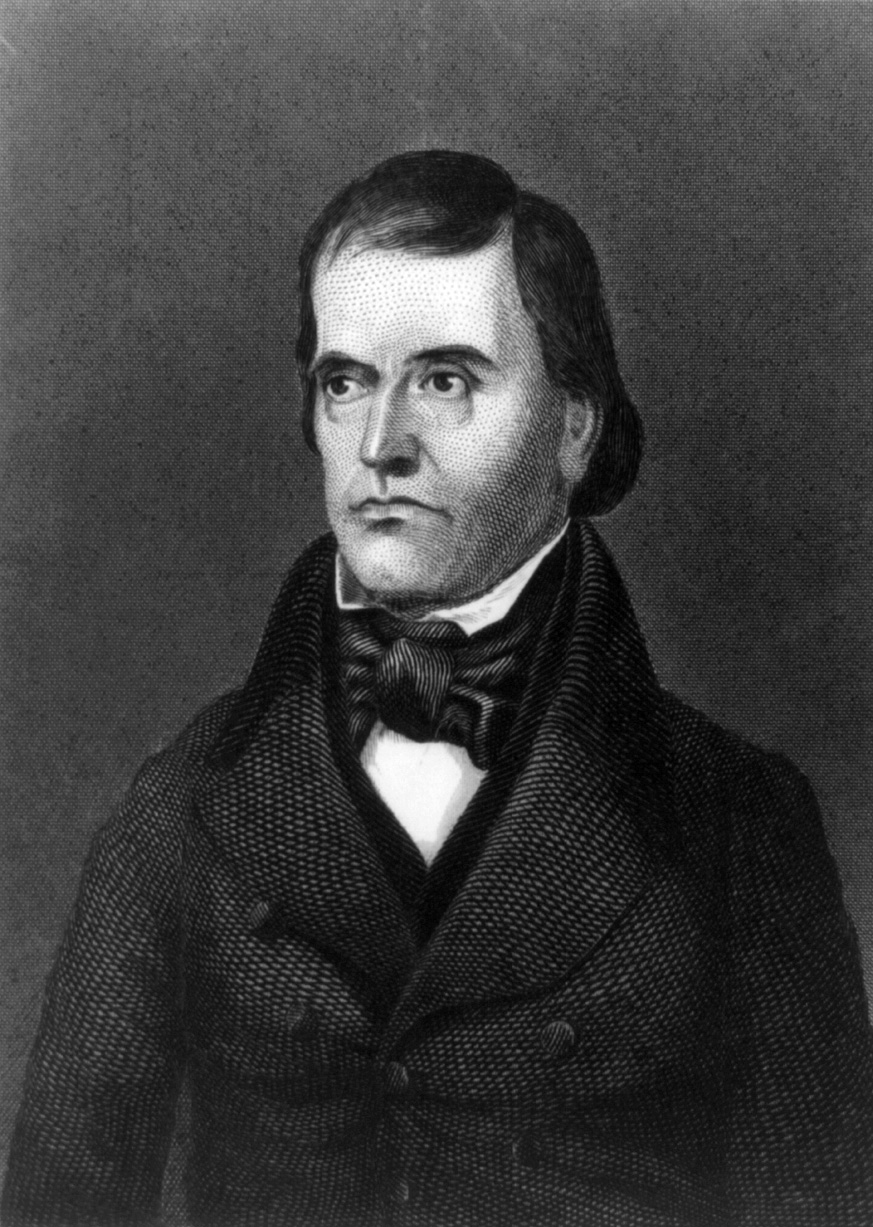
| Nominee | Samuel Bigger | Tilghman Howard |
| Party | Whig | Democratic |
| Popular vote | 62,932 | 54,274 |
| Percentage | 53.69% | 46.31% |
- County results Bigger: 50–60% 60–70% Howard: 50–60% 60–70% 70–80% 80–90% No Vote/Data
Governor before election
David Wallace
Whig
Elected Governor
Samuel Bigger
Whig

The 1840 Indiana gubernatorial election was held on August 3, 1840, in order to elect the Governor of Indiana. Whig nominee and former member of the Indiana House of Representatives Samuel Bigger defeated Democratic nominee and incumbent member of the U.S. House of Representatives from Indiana's 7th district Tilghman Howard.

== General election ==
On election day, August 3, 1840, Whig nominee Samuel Bigger won the election by a margin of 8,658 votes against his opponent Democratic nominee Tilghman Howard, thereby retaining Whig control over the office of Governor. Bigger was sworn in as the 7th Governor of Indiana on December 9, 1840.

=== Results ===
Indiana gubernatorial election, 1840
| Party | Candidate | Votes | % |
|---|---|---|---|
| Whig | Samuel Bigger | 62,932 | 53.69 |
| Democratic | Tilghman Howard | 54,274 | 46.31 |
| Total votes | | 117,206 | 100.00 |
| Whig hold | | | |
