= 2028 Indiana gubernatorial election =

- November 7, 2028
Party	Republican	Democratic
Incumbent governor
Mike Braun
Republican

The 2028 Indiana gubernatorial election will be held on November 7, 2028, to elect the governor of Indiana to a four-year term. Incumbent Republican governor Mike Braun is running for re-election.

== Republican primary ==
=== Candidates ===
==== Declared ====
- Mike Braun, incumbent governor

==== Potential ====
- Todd Rokita, attorney general of Indiana (2021–present)
- Micah Beckwith, lieutenant governor of Indiana (2025–present)
- Curtis Hill, former attorney general of Indiana (2017–2021)

== Democratic primary ==
=== Candidates ===
==== Potential ====
- Joe Donnelly, U.S. Ambassador to the Holy See (2022–2024) and former U.S. senator (2013–2019)

==== Declined ====
- Beau Bayh, secretary of state-elect
