= 1837 Indiana gubernatorial election =

- August 7, 1837
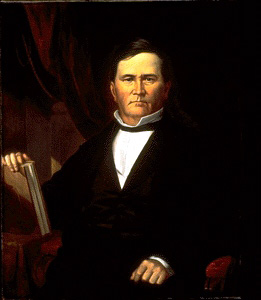

Nominee	David Wallace	John Dumont
Party	Whig	Whig
Popular vote	46,067	36,915
Percentage	55.51%	44.49%
- County results Wallace: 50–60% 60–70% 70–80% 80–90% 90–100% Dumont: 50–60% 60–70% 70–80% 80–90% 90–100% No Vote/Data
Governor before election
Noah Noble
Whig
Elected Governor
David Wallace
Whig

The 1837 Indiana gubernatorial election was held on August 7, 1837. The Whig lieutenant governor of Indiana David Wallace defeated the Whig senator from Switzerland County John Dumont.

The Indiana Democratic Party did not hold a state convention as they had done in 1834. For a time Wallace appeared to run unopposed, until the entry of Dumont and Democrat Gamaliel Taylor in late April. Taylor withdrew from the race shortly before the election, after which Democrats informally supported Dumont. Both Taylor and Dumont supported completing public works projects mandated by the Mammoth Internal Improvement Act in order of priority, while Wallace favored completing all projects simultaneously.

== Results ==
Indiana gubernatorial election, 1837
Party	Candidate	Votes	%
Whig	David Wallace	46,067	55.51
Whig	John Dumont	36,915	44.48
Democratic	Gamaliel Taylor (withdrawn)	3	0.00
Write-in	Jeremiah Roe	2	0.00
Write-in	Abel C. Pepper	1	0.00
Write-in	Jeremiah Tillotson	1	0.00
Total votes		82,989	100.00
Whig hold			
