= 1846 Indiana gubernatorial election =

- August 3, 1846
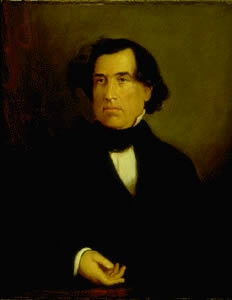

Nominee	James Whitcomb	Joseph G. Marshall
Party	Democratic	Whig
Popular vote	64,104	60,138
Percentage	50.65%	47.52%
- County results Whitcomb: 40–50% 50–60% 60–70% 70–80% 80–90% Marshall: 40–50% 50–60% 60–70% No Vote/Data
Governor before election
James Whitcomb
Democratic
Elected Governor
James Whitcomb
Democratic

The 1846 Indiana gubernatorial election was held on August 3, 1846.

Incumbent Democratic Governor James Whitcomb defeated Whig nominee Joseph G. Marshall and Liberty nominee Stephen C. Stevens with 50.65% of the vote.

== General election ==
=== Candidates ===
- Joseph G. Marshall, Whig, attorney
- Stephen C. Stevens, Liberty, former justice of the Indiana Supreme Court
- James Whitcomb, Democratic, incumbent Governor

=== Results ===
1846 Indiana gubernatorial election (Note: The Indiana State Senate Journal and some other sources give the result as Whitcomb 64,104, Marshall 60,067, Stevens 2,278.)
Party	Candidate	Votes	%
Democratic	James Whitcomb	64,104	50.65%
Whig	Joseph G. Marshall	60,138	47.52%
Liberty	Stephen C. Stevens	2,301	1.82%
Write-in	Joseph S. Harding	17	0.01
Write-in	John Burk	2	0.00
Write-in	J. C. Stephenson	1	0.00
Write-in	David Wallace	1	0.00
Majority		3,966	3.13%
Turnout		126,564	
Democratic hold			
