= 1825 Indiana gubernatorial election =

- August 1, 1825
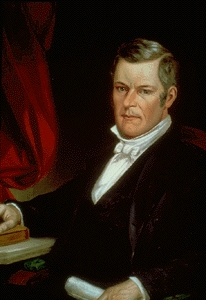

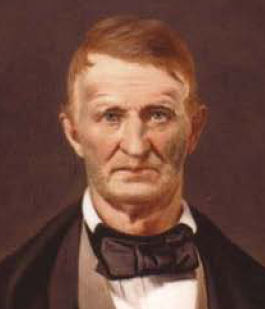
Nominee	James B. Ray	Isaac Blackford
Popular vote	13,852	12,165
Percentage	53.24%	46.76%
- County results Ray: 50–60% 60–70% 70–80% 80–90% >90% Blackford: 50–60% 60–70% 70–80% 80–90% >90% No data Non-voting area
Governor before election
James B. Ray
Elected Governor
James B. Ray

The 1825 Indiana gubernatorial election took place on August 1, 1825, under the provisions of the Constitution of Indiana. It was the fourth gubernatorial election in the State of Indiana. James B. Ray, the incumbent governor following the resignation of William Hendricks, was reelected to a full term, defeating Isaac Blackford, the chief justice of the Indiana Supreme Court. The election took place concurrently with elections for lieutenant governor and members of the Indiana General Assembly.

William Hendricks won the 1822 Indiana gubernatorial election without facing any significant opposition and remains the only governor of Indiana to be elected unanimously. Rather than seek reelection to a second three-year term, Hendricks ran for the United States Senate and was elected on the fourth ballot of the General Assembly by a narrow majority of two votes. He formally resigned the governorship on February 12, 1825, the last day of the state legislative session. As the elected lieutenant governor, Ratliff Boon, had resigned his office the previous year following his election to the United States House of Representatives, the president pro tempore of the Indiana Senate, James B. Ray, became acting governor.

There was some controversy as to whether Ray could lawfully continue as governor for the remainder of Hendricks' term, with some arguing he must forfeit the office following the end of his senatorial term in August. Others questioned whether Ray, who was a few days shy of thirty when Hendricks resigned, was constitutionally eligible to serve as governor. Article IV§4 of the Indiana Constitution required the governor be "at least thirty years of age, and shall have been a citizen of the united States ten years, and have resided in the State five years next preceding his Election." A Richmond paper asserted Ray was only twenty-eight years old and described his ascension as "an usurpation, which should not be tolerated by the people of the state". The issue of Ray's age and the legality of his governorship persisted as the 1825 gubernatorial campaign commenced.

Despite the bitterly polarizing presidential election only the previous year, the campaign was conducted on a nonpartisan basis. Ray announced his candidacy in May and received the support of the Indianapolis Gazette and other newspapers, who praised his legislative experience, humility, and diligence. In addition to Ray, Chief Justice Blackford, Justices Jesse Lynch Holman and James Scott of the state supreme court, and State Representative David H. Maxwell were mentioned as potential candidates. By spring, Blackford has emerged as the main opposition to Ray. Both campaigns praised their candidate's experience and moral attributes, while disparaging their opponent as a craven office-seeker. While Blackford was rebuked for seeking the governorship while serving on the state supreme court, Ray came under criticism for campaigning for a seat in Congress while still a member of the State Senate in 1824. Both campaigns likewise sought to portray their candidate as a man of the people, in contrast to the opponent's perceived elitism. Blackford was endorsed by the Indiana Journal, whose editor nevertheless conceded Ray had competently carried out his duties as acting governor, while there were few important policy differences between the candidates.

== Results ==
Ray defeated Blackford decisively, polling strongest in the eastern counties. The county returns, provided below, are incomplete: in his inaugural message to the General Assembly, Ray noted that eleven communities had failed to make returns for the gubernatorial election.

1825 Indiana gubernatorial election
Party	Candidate	Votes	%
Nonpartisan	James B. Ray	13,852	53.24%
Nonpartisan	Isaac Blackford	12,165	46.76%
Total votes		26,017	100.00%

=== Results by county ===
	James B. Ray		Isaac Blackford		County total
County	Votes	Percent	Votes	Percent	
Allen	41	42.71%	55	57.29%	96
Bartholomew	238	47.32%	265	52.68%	503
Clark	541	46.04%	634	53.96%	1,175
Clay	unknown		unknown		unknown
Crawford	44	8.78%	457	91.22%	501
Daviess	297	49.25%	306	50.75%	603
Dearborn	886	57.20%	663	42.80%	1,549
Decatur	278	71.10%	113	28.90%	391
Dubois	unknown		unknown		unknown
Fayette	690	70.41%	290	29.59%	980
Floyd	305	51.26%	290	48.74%	595
Franklin	824	63.29%	478	36.11%	1,302
Gibson	55	15.62%	297	84.38%	352
Greene	80	24.92%	241	75.08%	321
Hamilton	79	68.70%	36	31.30%	115
Harrison	490	43.79%	629	56.21%	1,119
Hendricks	unknown		unknown		unknown
Henry	303	82.79%	63	17.21%	366
Jackson	135	31.32%	296	68.68%	431
Jefferson	299	22.33%	1,040	77.67%	1,339
Jennings	31	6.70%	432	93.30%	463
Johnson	103	61.68%	64	38.32%	167
Knox	230	34.12%	444	65.88%	674
Lawrence	374	49.21%	386	50.79%	760
Madison	91	68.94%	41	31.06%	132
Marion	288	58.30%	206	41.70%	494
Martin	167	71.98%	65	28.02%	232
Monroe	404	71.89%	158	28.11%	562
Montgomery	113	72.90%	42	27.10%	155
Morgan	110	44.53%	137	55.47%	247
Orange	205	25.22%	608	74.78%	813
Owen	91	27.33%	242	72.67%	333
Parke	268	75.92%	85	24.08%	353
Perry	106	38.27%	171	61.73%	277
Pike	43	21.82%	154	78.18%	197
Posey	40	5.85%	644	94.15%	684
Putnam	unknown		unknown		unknown
Randolph	unknown		unknown		unknown
Ripley	445	81.20%	103	18.80%	548
Rush	386	76.28%	120	23.72%	506
Scott (Note: Scott County gave Ray a majority of 20 votes over Blackford.)	unknown		unknown		unknown
Shelby	203	62.46%	122	37.54%	325
Spencer	337	82.20%	73	17.80%	410
Sullivan (Note: Sullivan County gave Ray a majority of 472 votes over Blackford.)	unknown		unknown		unknown
Switzerland	687	83.78%	133	16.22%	820
Union	600	80.00%	150	20.00%	750
Vanderburgh	218	77.86%	62	22.14%	280
Vermillion	unknown		unknown		unknown
Vigo	271	53.03%	240	46.07%	511
Warrick	275	93.22%	20	6.78%	295
Washington	994	65.87%	515	34.13%	1,509
Wayne	1,187	66.24%	595	33.76%	1,782

== Bibliography ==
- Carmony, Donald Francis (1998). Indiana 1816-1850: the Pioneer Era. Indianapolis: Indiana Historical Society. ISBN 0-87195-125-8.
- Foughty, Trevor (May 23, 2019). "1825 Indiana General Election Results: Governor". Capitol & Washington.
- "Indiana Governor James Brown Ray (1794 - 1848)". Indiana Historical Bureau. December 15, 2020.
- Riker, Dorothy; Thornbrough, Gayle (1960). Indiana Election Returns: 1816-1851. Indiana Historical Bureau.
