= 1860 Indiana gubernatorial election =

- October 9, 1860
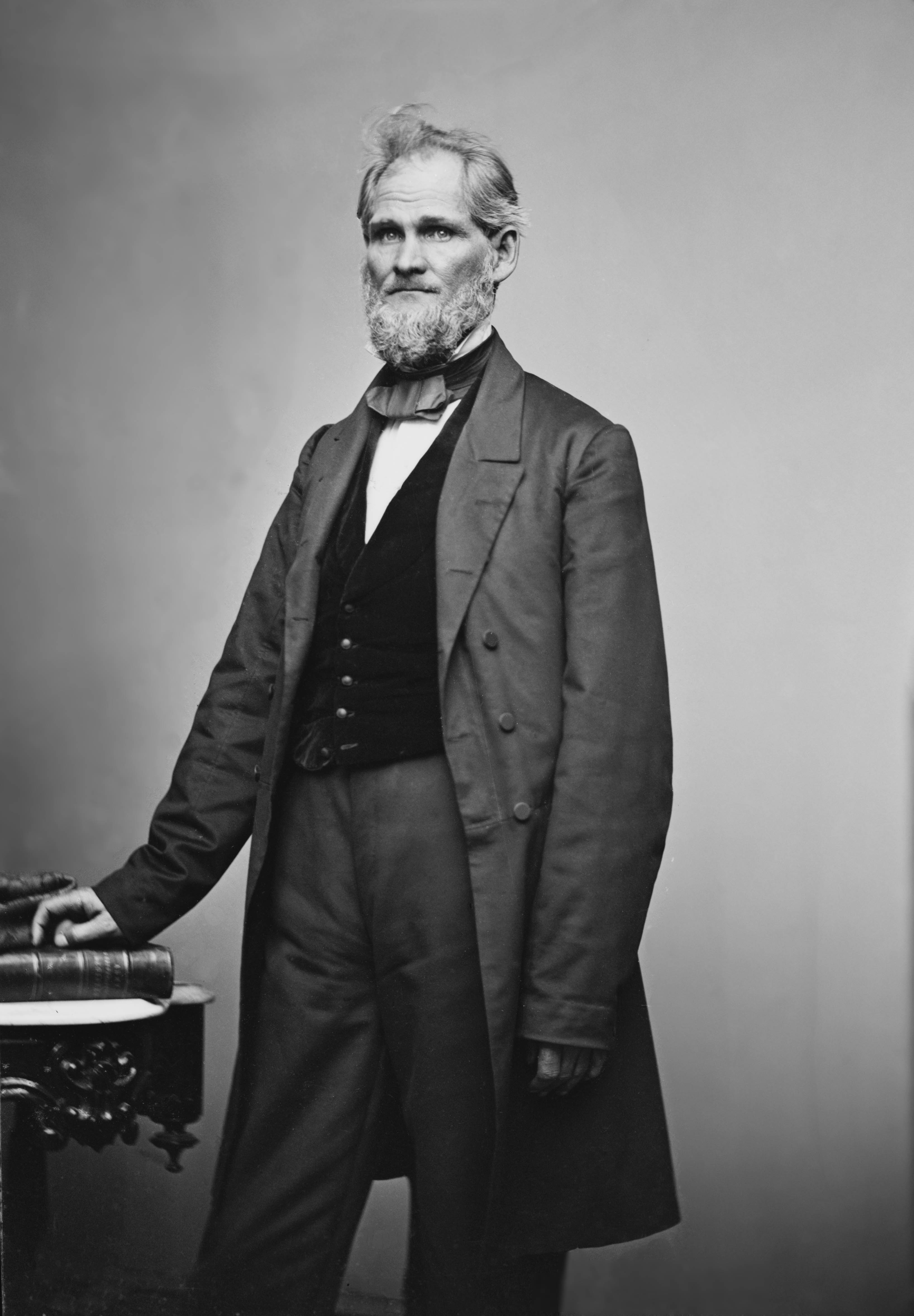

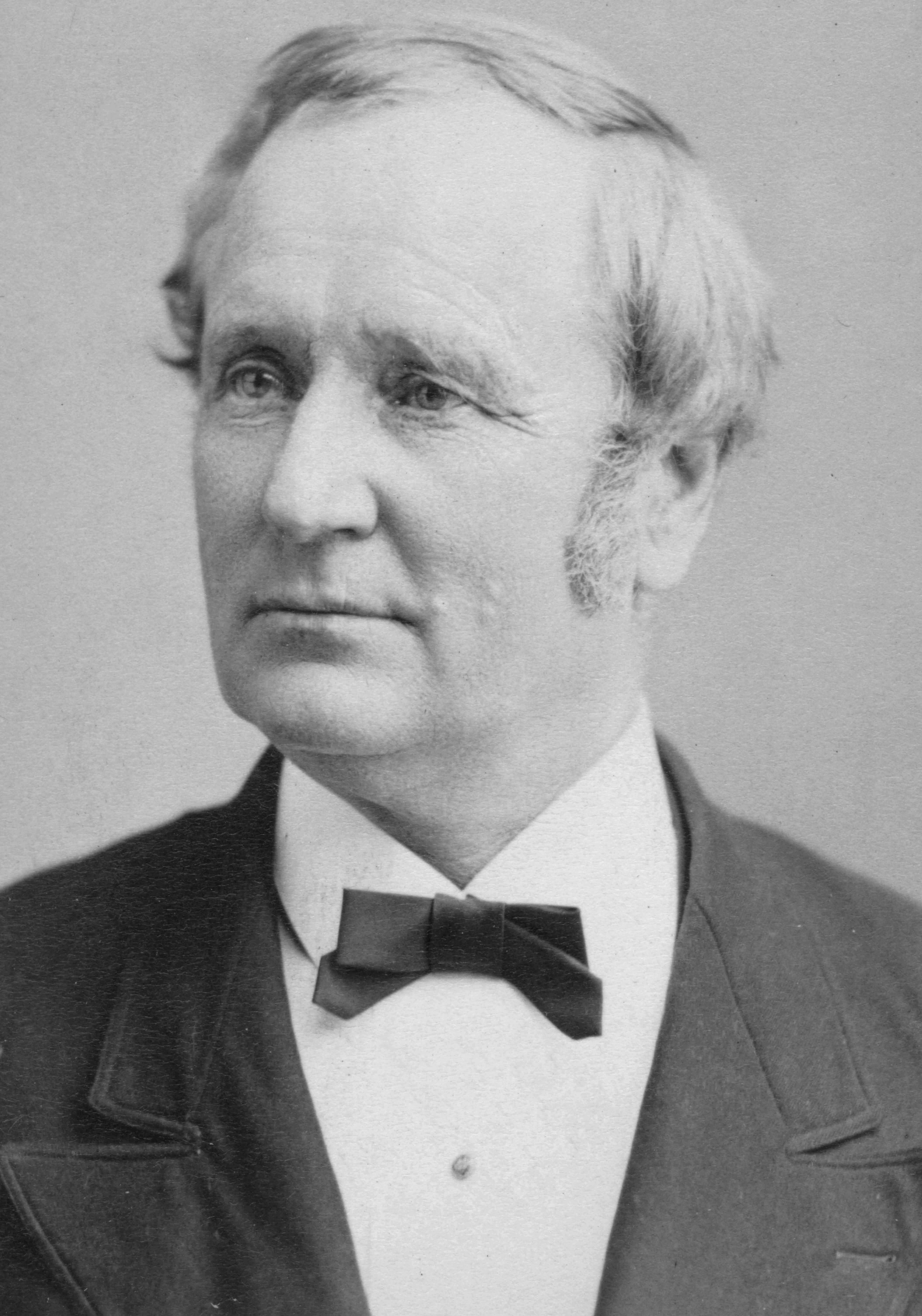
| Nominee | Henry S. Lane | Thomas A. Hendricks |
| Party | Republican | Democratic |
| Popular vote | 136,736 | 126,767 |
| Percentage | 51.89% | 48.11% |
- County results Lane: 50–60% 60–70% Hendricks: 50–60% 60–70% 70–80% 80–90%
Governor before election
Ashbel P. Willard
Democratic
Elected Governor
Henry S. Lane
Republican

The 1860 Indiana gubernatorial election was held on October 9, 1860. Republican nominee Henry S. Lane defeated Democratic nominee Thomas A. Hendricks with 51.89% of the vote.

== General election ==
=== Candidates ===
- Henry S. Lane, Republican, former U.S. Representative
- Thomas A. Hendricks, Democratic, former U.S. Representative

=== Results ===
1860 Indiana gubernatorial election
| Party | Candidate | Votes | % | ±% |
|---|---|---|---|---|
| Republican | Henry S. Lane | 136,736 | 51.89% | |
| Democratic | Thomas A. Hendricks | 126,767 | 48.11% | |
| Majority | | 9,969 | | |
| Turnout | | | | |
| Republican gain from Democratic | | Swing | | |
