= 1948 Indiana gubernatorial election =

- November 2, 1948
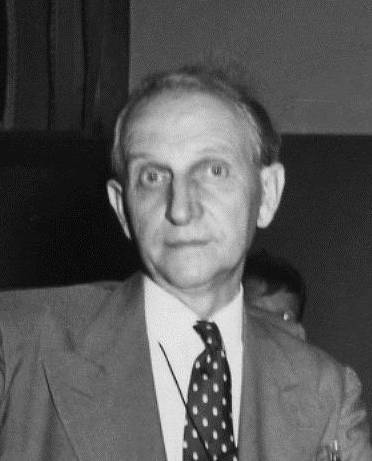

Nominee	Henry F. Schricker	Hobart Creighton
Party	Democratic	Republican
Popular vote	884,995	745,892
Percentage	53.56%	45.14%
- County results Schricker: 40–50% 50–60% 60–70% Creighton: 40–50% 50–60% 60–70%
Governor before election
Ralph F. Gates
Republican
Elected Governor
Henry F. Schricker
Democratic

The 1948 Indiana gubernatorial election was held on November 2, 1948. Democratic nominee Henry F. Schricker defeated Republican nominee Hobart Creighton with 53.56% of the vote.

== General election ==
=== Candidates ===
Major party candidates

- Henry F. Schricker, Democratic, former Governor (1941 – 1945)
- Hobart Creighton, Republican

Other candidates

- Clinton W. Speicher, Prohibition
- Walter Frisbie, Progressive
- William Rabe, Socialist
- Charles Ginsberg, Socialist Labor

=== Results ===
1948 Indiana gubernatorial election
Party	Candidate	Votes	%	±%
Democratic	Henry F. Schricker	884,995	53.56%	
Republican	Hobart Creighton	745,892	45.14%	
Prohibition	Clinton W. Speicher	13,582	0.82%	
Progressive	Walter Frisbie	6,259	0.38%	
Socialist	William Rabe	985	0.06%	
Socialist Labor	Charles Ginsberg	608	0.04%	
Majority		139,103		
Turnout		1,652,321		
Democratic gain from Republican		Swing		
