= 1940 Indiana gubernatorial election =

- November 5, 1940
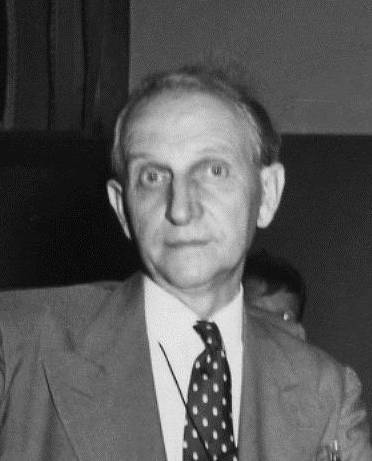

Nominee	Henry F. Schricker	Glenn R. Hillis
Party	Democratic	Republican
Popular vote	889,620	885,657
Percentage	49.92%	49.69%
- County results Schricker: 50–60% 60–70% Hillis: 40–50% 50–60% 60–70%
Governor before election
M. Clifford Townsend
Democratic
Elected Governor
Henry F. Schricker
Democratic

The 1940 Indiana gubernatorial election was held on November 5, 1940. Democratic nominee Henry F. Schricker narrowly defeated Republican nominee Glenn R. Hillis with 49.92% of the vote.

== General election ==
=== Candidates ===
Major party candidates

- Henry F. Schricker, Democratic, Lieutenant Governor under M. Clifford Townsend
- Glenn R. Hillis, Republican
- James Emmert, Republican, former Shelby County Circuit Court judge

Other candidates

- Mary Donovan Hapgood, Socialist
- Omer S. Whiteman, Prohibition
- Herman Barcus Barefield, Socialist Labor

=== Results ===
1940 Indiana gubernatorial election
Party	Candidate	Votes	%	±%
Democratic	Henry F. Schricker	889,620	49.92%	
Republican	Glenn R. Hillis	885,657	49.69%	
Socialist	Mary Donovan Hapgood	4,869	0.27%	
Prohibition	Omer S. Whiteman	1,455	0.08%	
Socialist Labor	Herman Barcus Barefield	651	0.04%	
Majority		3,963		
Turnout				
Democratic hold		Swing		
