= 1936 Indiana gubernatorial election =

- November 3, 1936
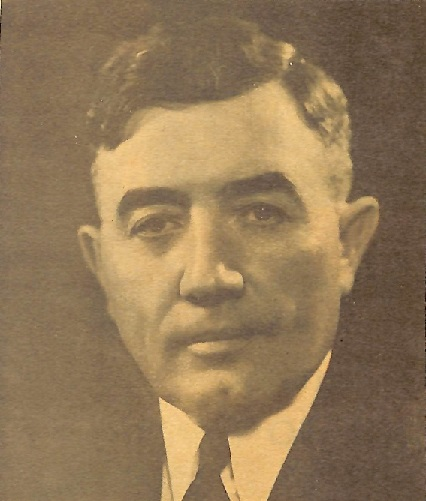

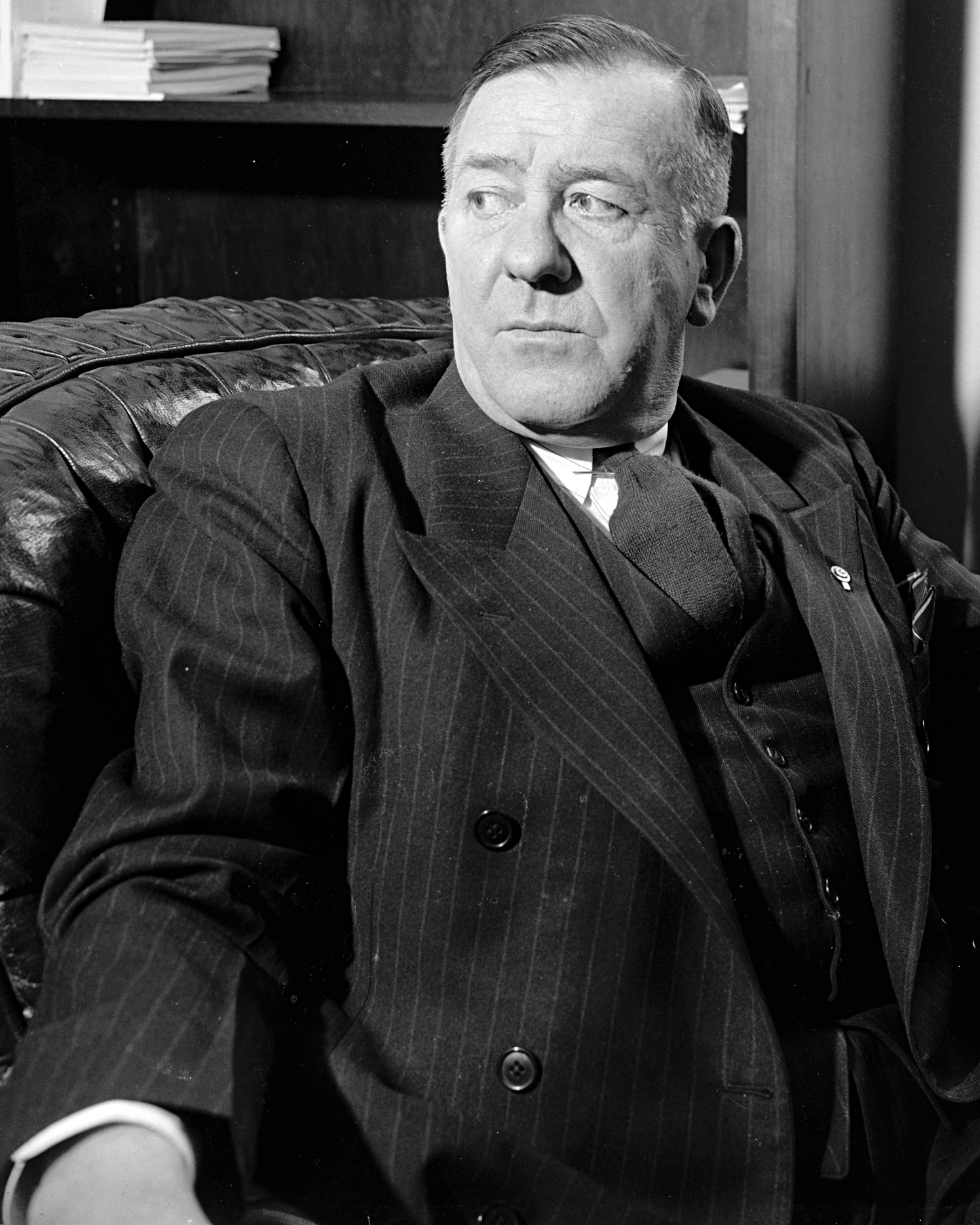
Nominee	M. Clifford Townsend	Raymond S. Springer
Party	Democratic	Republican
Popular vote	908,494	727,526
Percentage	55.36%	44.33%
- County results Townsend: 50–60% 60–70% 70–80% Springer: 50–60%
Governor before election
Paul V. McNutt
Democratic
Elected Governor
M. Clifford Townsend
Democratic

The 1936 Indiana gubernatorial election was held on November 3, 1936. Democratic nominee M. Clifford Townsend defeated Republican nominee Raymond S. Springer with 55.36% of the vote.

== General election ==
=== Candidates ===
Major party candidates

- M. Clifford Townsend, Democratic, Lieutenant Governor under Paul V. McNutt
- Raymond S. Springer, Republican, former judge of the 37th Judicial Circuit Court

Other candidates

- Marie B. Tomsich, Socialist
- Wenzel Stocker, Communist

=== Results ===
1936 Indiana gubernatorial election
Party	Candidate	Votes	%	±%
Democratic	M. Clifford Townsend	908,494	55.36%	
Republican	Raymond S. Springer	727,526	44.33%	
Socialist	Marie B. Tomsich	3,871	0.24%	
Communist	Wenzel Stocker	1,183	0.07%	
Majority		180,968		
Turnout				
Democratic hold		Swing		
