= 1932 Indiana gubernatorial election =

- November 8, 1932
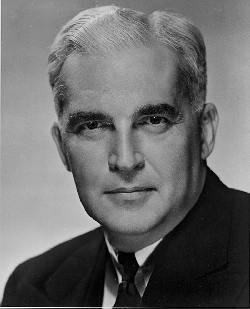

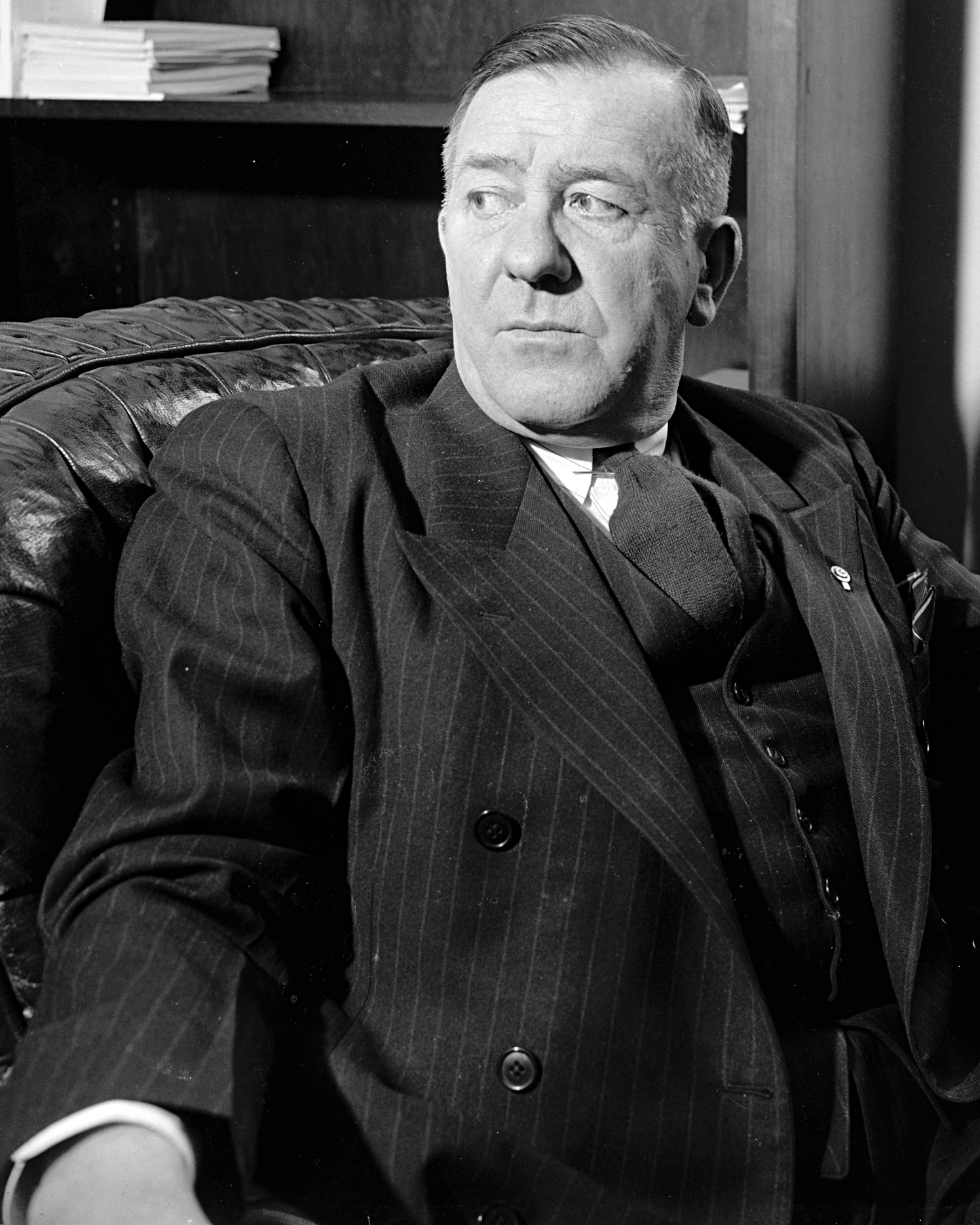
Nominee	Paul V. McNutt	Raymond S. Springer
Party	Democratic	Republican
Popular vote	862,127	669,797
Percentage	55.02%	42.75%
- County results McNutt: 50–60% 60–70% 70–80% Springer: 40–50% 50–60%
Governor before election
Harry G. Leslie
Republican
Elected Governor
Paul V. McNutt
Democratic

The 1932 Indiana gubernatorial election was held on November 8, 1932, to elect the Governor of Indiana. Democratic nominee Paul V. McNutt defeated Republican nominee Raymond S. Springer, receiving 55.02% of the vote to Springer's 42.75%.

McNutt won by 192,330 votes, a margin of 12.27 percentage points, and the election resulted in a Democratic gain from the Republicans. He took office on January 9, 1933, succeeding Republican governor Harry G. Leslie, and became the first Democratic governor of Indiana since Samuel M. Ralston.

== General election ==
=== Candidates ===
==== Major-party candidates ====
- Paul V. McNutt, Democratic, chairman of the Indiana Democratic Party
- Raymond S. Springer, Republican, former judge of Indiana's 37th Judicial Circuit Court

==== Other candidates ====
- Powers Hapgood, Socialist
- F. W. Lough, Prohibition
- Ward B. Hiner, National
- Theodore Luesse, Communist
- Charley Lynch, Socialist Labor

=== Results ===
1932 Indiana gubernatorial election
Party	Candidate	Votes	%	±%
Democratic	Paul V. McNutt	862,127	55.02%	
Republican	Raymond S. Springer	669,797	42.75%	
Socialist	Powers Hapgood	18,735	1.20%	
Prohibition	F. W. Lough	9,273	0.59%	
National	Ward B. Hiner	3,052	0.20%	
Communist	Theodore Luesse	2,129	0.14%	
Socialist Labor	Charley Lynch	1,796	0.12%	
Total votes		1,566,909	100.00%	
Majority		192,330	12.27%	
Democratic gain from Republican		Swing		
