= 1872 Indiana gubernatorial election =

- October 8, 1872
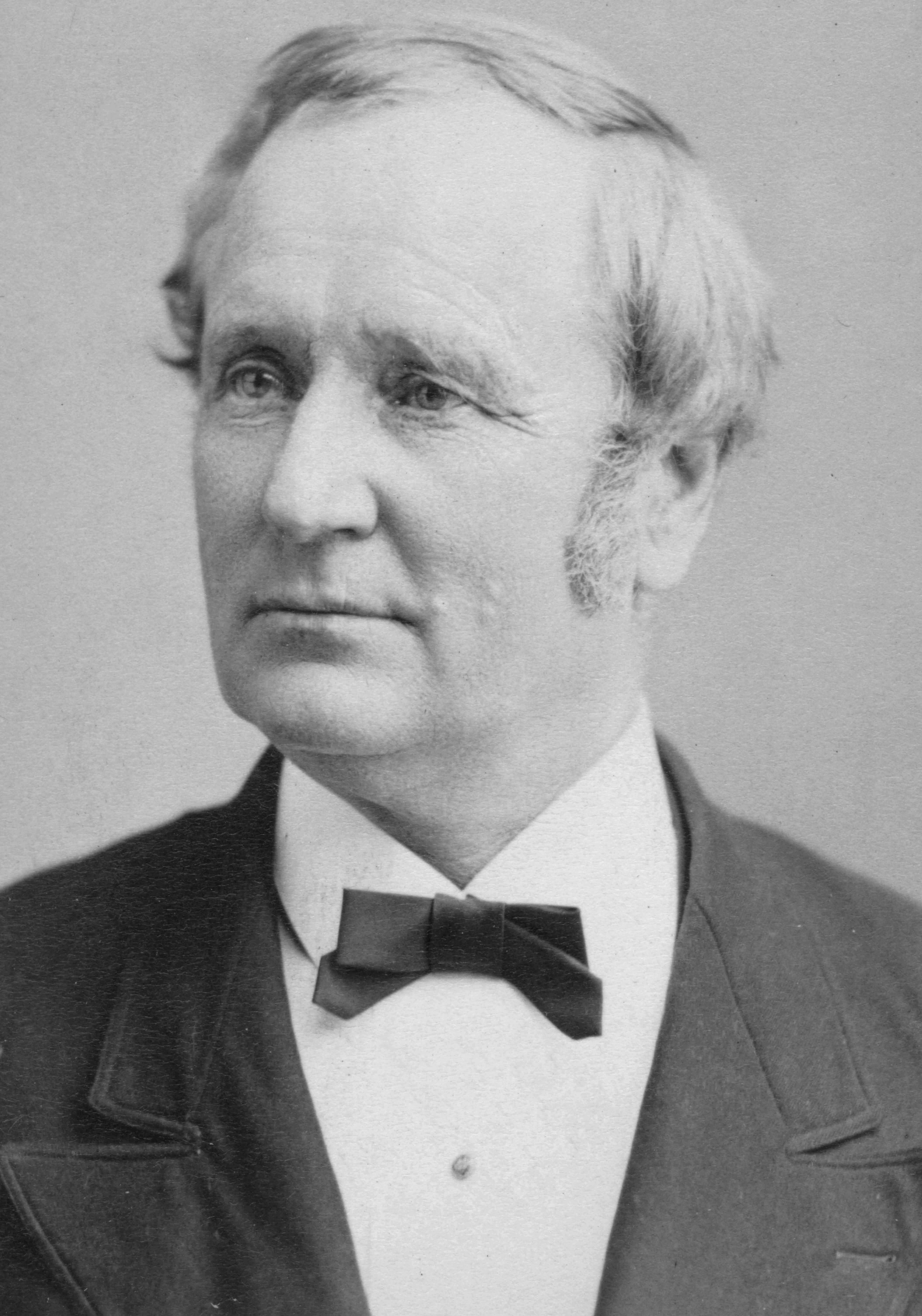

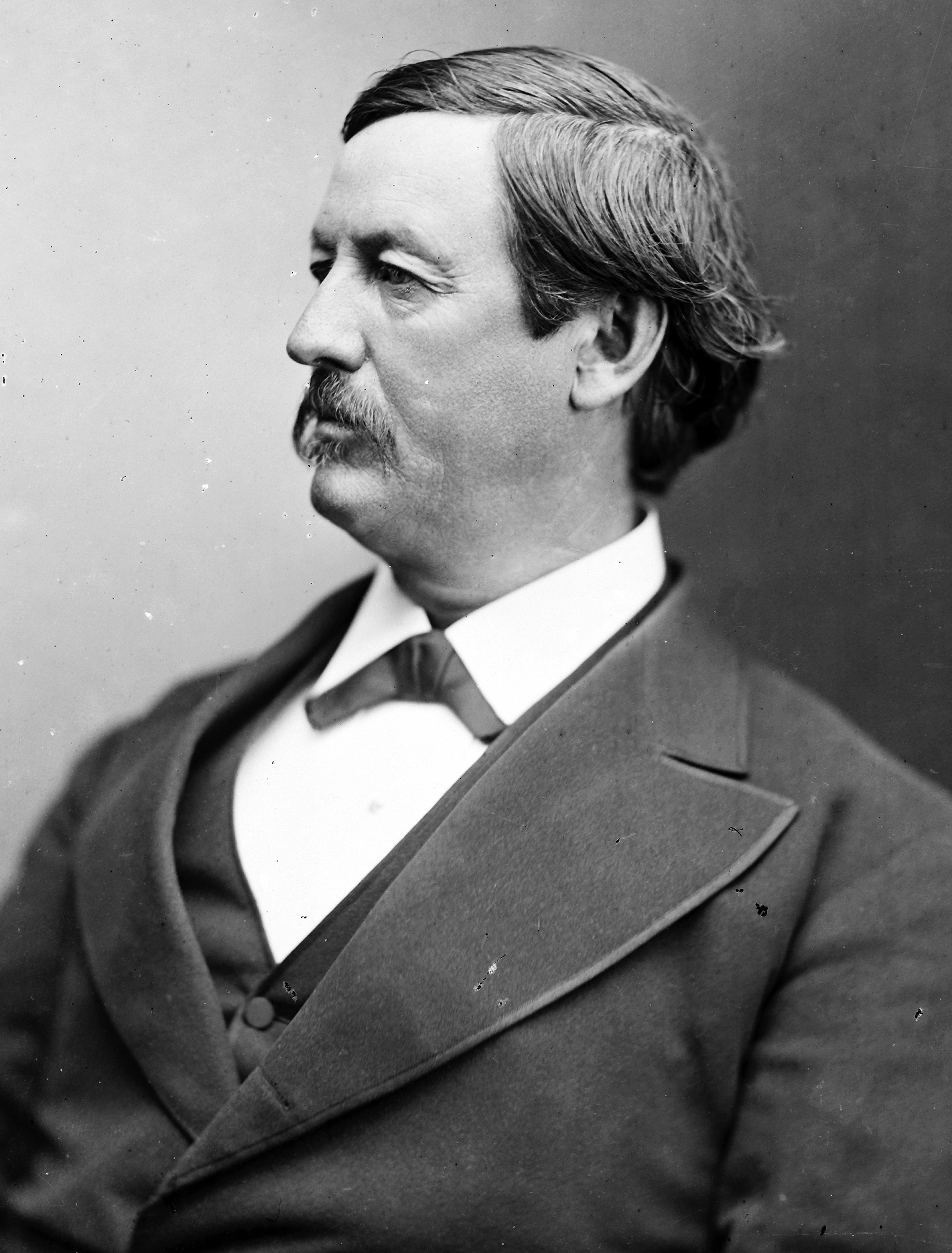
Nominee	Thomas A. Hendricks	Thomas M. Browne
Party	Democratic	Republican
Popular vote	189,424	188,276
Percentage	50.12%	49.82%
- County results Hendricks: 50–60% 60–70% 70–80% Browne: 50–60% 60–70%
Governor before election
Conrad Baker
Republican
Elected Governor
Thomas A. Hendricks
Democratic

The 1872 Indiana gubernatorial election was held on October 8, 1872. Democratic nominee Thomas A. Hendricks defeated Republican nominee Thomas M. Browne with 50.12% of the vote.

== General election ==
=== Candidates ===
- Thomas A. Hendricks, Democratic, former U.S. Senator
- Thomas M. Browne, Republican, former United States Attorney for the District of Indiana

=== Results ===
1872 Indiana gubernatorial election
Party	Candidate	Votes	%	±%
Democratic	Thomas A. Hendricks	189,424	50.12%	
Republican	Thomas M. Browne	188,276	49.82%	
Majority		1,148		
Turnout				
Democratic gain from Republican		Swing		
