= 1868 Indiana gubernatorial election =

- October 13, 1868
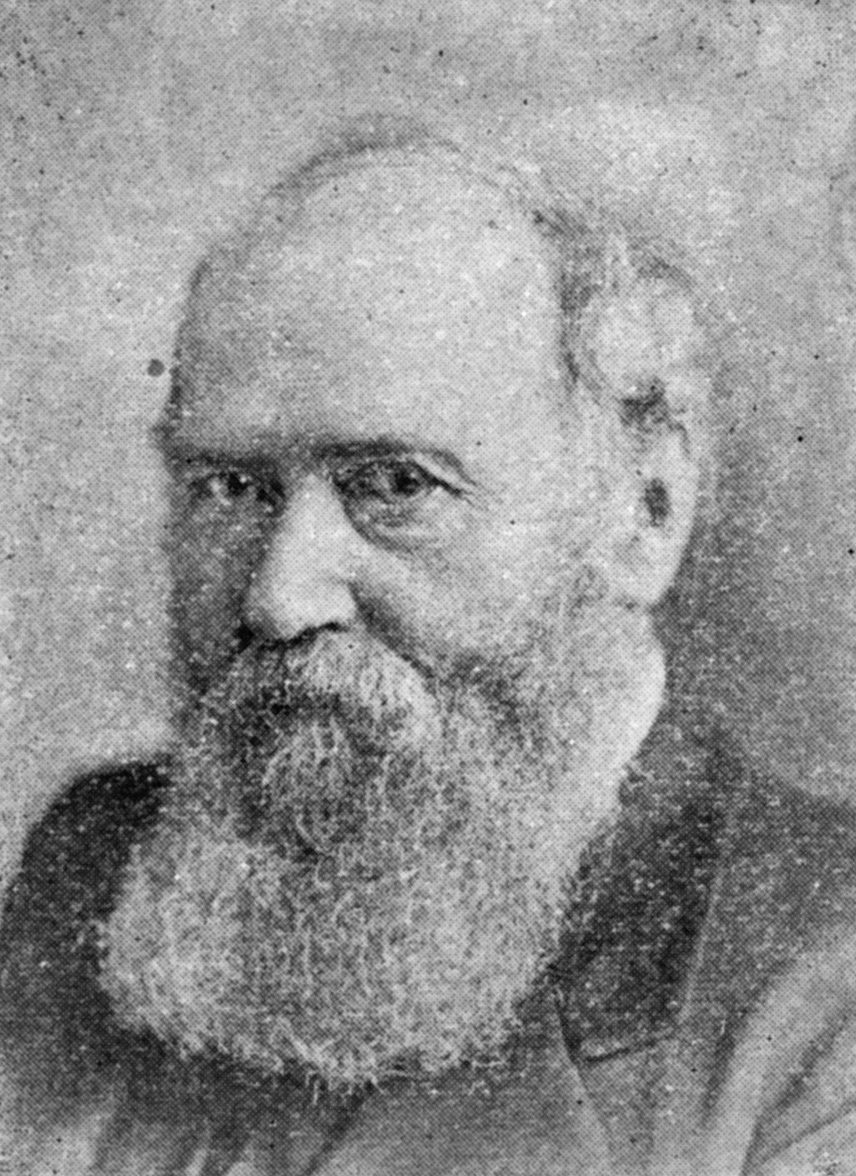

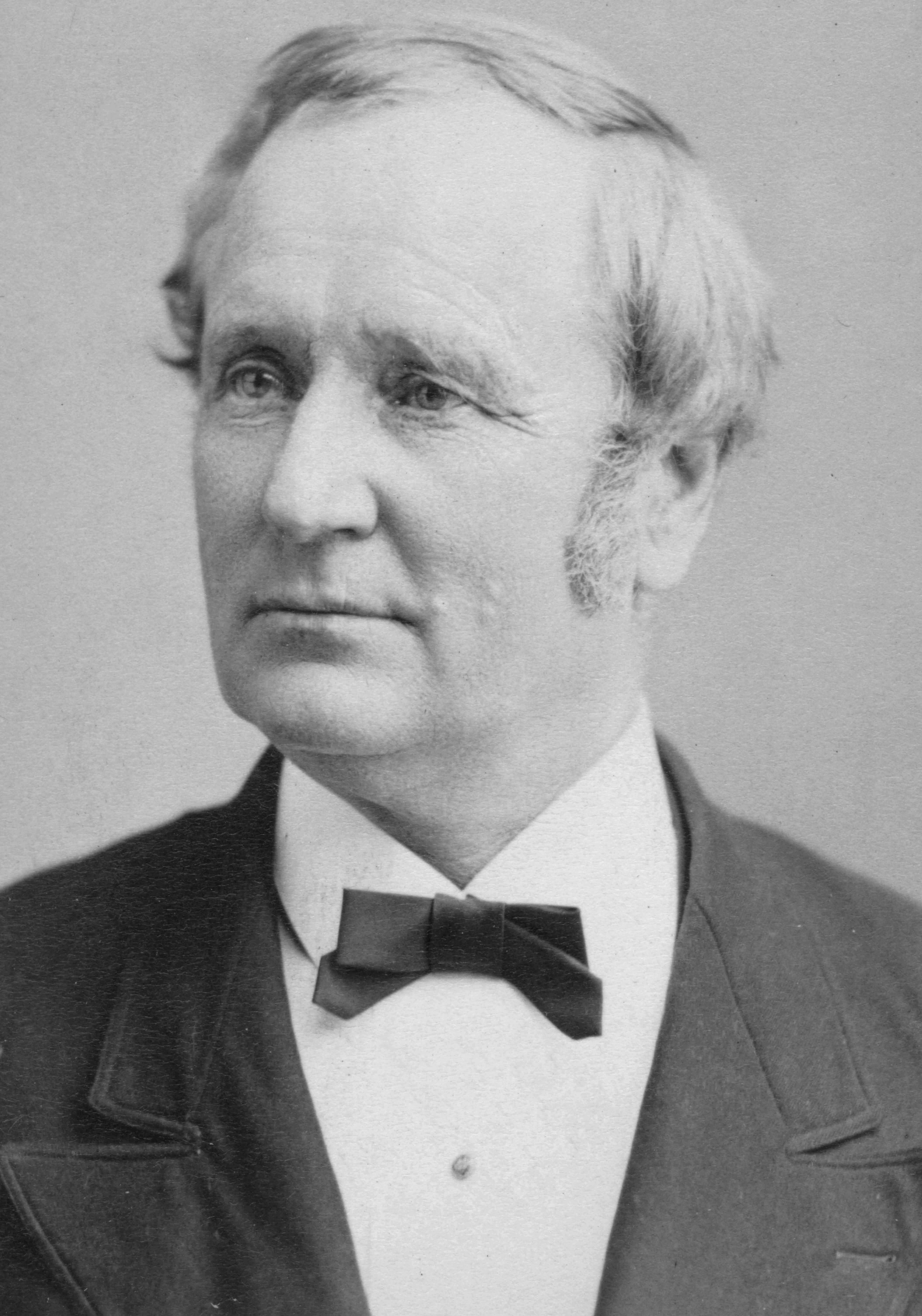
Nominee	Conrad Baker	Thomas A. Hendricks
Party	Republican	Democratic
Popular vote	171,523	170,602
Percentage	50.14%	49.87%
- County results Baker: 50–60% 60–70% 70–80% Hendricks: 50–60% 60–70% 70–80% 80–90%
Governor before election
Conrad Baker
National Union
Elected Governor
Conrad Baker
Republican

The 1868 Indiana gubernatorial election was held on October 13, 1868. Incumbent Republican Conrad Baker defeated Democratic nominee Thomas A. Hendricks with 50.14% of the vote.

== General election ==
=== Candidates ===
- Conrad Baker, Republican, former Lieutenant Governor under Oliver P. Morton
- Thomas A. Hendricks, Democratic, U.S. Senator

=== Results ===
1868 Indiana gubernatorial election
Party	Candidate	Votes	%	±%
Republican	Conrad Baker (incumbent)	171,523	50.14%	
Democratic	Thomas A. Hendricks	170,602	49.87%	
Majority		921		
Turnout				
Republican gain from National Union		Swing		
