= Milton Stapp =

American politician (1792–1869)

5th Lieutenant Governor of Indiana
- In office December 3, 1828 – December 7, 1831
- Governor: James B. Ray
- Preceded by: John H. Thompson
- Succeeded by: David Wallace

Personal details
- Born: July 14, 1792 Scott County, Kentucky, U.S.
- Died: August 2, 1869 (aged 77) Galveston, Texas, U.S.
- Party: Independent, Whig

Milton Stapp (July 14, 1792 – August 2, 1869) was an American politician who served as the fifth lieutenant governor of Indiana from 1828 to 1831.

Stapp was born in Kentucky. Settling in Madison, Indiana, Stapp worked as a shopkeeper. He served in the War of 1812 and attained the rank of general. He was later elected to the Indiana Senate and served as president pro tempore of the state senate in 1825. From 1828 to 1831, he served as lieutenant governor under James B. Ray. He later became a member of the Whig Party. He succeeded Moody Park to become the second mayor of Madison, serving from 1850 to 1853. As Mayor, he was known to arrest citizens on the streets unaided. In 1853, he bought a Madison newspaper, the Banner. He also served as the state canal commissioner and the state late fund commissioner.
