= Robert Hanna Jr. =

American politician

Robert Hanna
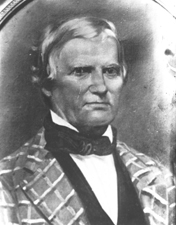

U.S. Senator from Indiana
- In office August 19, 1831 – January 3, 1832
- Appointed by: James B. Ray
- Preceded by: James Noble
- Succeeded by: John Tipton

Member of the Indiana House of Representatives
- In office 1832–33; 1836–39

Member of the Indiana Senate
- In office 1840–41; 1842–46

Personal details
- Born: April 6, 1786 South Carolina, US
- Died: November 16, 1858 (aged 72) Indianapolis, Indiana, US
- Resting place: Crown Hill Cemetery and Arboretum, Section 2, Lot 131
- Party: Democratic-Republican

Robert Hanna Jr. (April 6, 1786 – November 16, 1858) is best known as one of the forty-three delegates to the 1816 Indiana Constitutional Convention and Indiana's third U.S. Senator after it achieved statehood in 1816. A native of Laurens County, South Carolina, he settled in the Indiana Territory shortly after it was established in 1800 and began his long career as a public servant in Brookville, Indiana. Hanna served as the first Franklin County sheriff (1809–20), as a brigadier general in the state militia, and as the United States General Land Office registrar in Brookville and Indianapolis (1820–30). Hanna was appointed to fill the vacant seat in the U.S. Senate following the death of James Noble in 1831. Hanna served in the U.S. Senate from August 19, 1831, to January 3, 1832. After his return to Indianapolis, Hanna represented Marion County in the Indiana House of Representatives (1832–33; 1836–39) and in the Indiana Senate (1840–41; 1842–46).

== Early life ==
Robert Hanna Jr. was born on April 6, 1786, near Fountainius in Laurens County, South Carolina. His father, Robert Hanna Sr., was born in Prince Edward County, Virginia. Immediately following Robert Sr.'s marriage to Mary Parks, the couple moved to South Carolina's Laurens District, where all nine of their children, including Robert Jr., were born.

The Hanna family moved to the Indiana Territory soon after the territory was established in 1800. Sometime between 1802 and 1804 the Hannas settled along the east fork of the Great Miami River, approximately 3 miles (4.8 km) north of Brookville, Indiana.

== Marriage and family ==
Hanna Jr. married Sarah Mowery (or Mowrey) on March 18, 1813, in Brookville. She was born in Virginia and died at Indianapolis, Indiana. Robert and Sarah Hanna were the parents of ten children: Valentine Claiborne Hanna, Captain Robert Barlow Hanna, James Fulton Hanna, William Harrison Hanna, Thomas Jefferson Hanna, George Washington Hanna, David Graem Hanna Jr., Catherine Mary Hanna, Captain Joseph Madison Hanna, and Captain Jonathan Littlejohn Hanna.

Hanna later married Olive Catherwood.

== Career ==
William Henry Harrison, the governor of the Indiana Territory, appointed Hanna as sheriff of the territory's eastern district in 1809. When Franklin County was established in 1811 Hanna became its first sheriff. On August 5, 1818, he won the election for Franklin County sheriff, beating John Allen, his opponent, 426 votes to 118. Hanna continued to serve as sheriff of Franklin County's common pleas court until 1820.

On May 13, 1816, Hanna was elected as one of the forty-three delegates to the 1816 Indiana Constitutional Convention at Corydon, Indiana, where the delegation considered statehood for the Indiana Territory and drafted the state's first constitution. Hanna was one of Franklin County's five representatives, which also included James Noble, who became Indiana's first U.S. Senator after it achieved statehood in 1816. When a state militia was organized in 1817, Hanna served as a brigadier general in its Sixth Brigade, Third Division.

In 1820 Hanna became the first registrar of the United States General Land Office at Brockville. The land-office building, now demolished, was located across the street from Hanna's Brookville residence. When the Indiana General Assembly relocated the federal land office Indianapolis in 1825, Hanna moved to the state capital and continued his work at the land office until 1830.

Hanna, who later became a contractor to build the National Road, was also an investor in the steamboat Robert Hanna. On April 11, 1831, it became the first steamboat to successfully navigate the White River from Cincinnati, Ohio, to Indianapolis. However, it ran aground on the return trip, ending efforts at steamboat navigation of the river until others tried again in 1865.

Indiana governor Noah Noble appointed Hanna to the U.S. Senate James Noble's death in 1831. Hanna became the third U.S. Senator from Indiana after statehood, with Noble and Waller Taylor preceding him in the office. Hanna served slightly longer than four months, from August 19, 1831, to January 3, 1832. After his return to Indianapolis, Hanna represented Marion County in the Indiana House of Representatives, where he served multiple terms: 1832–33 (Seventeenth Regular Session) and 1836–39 (Twenty-first, Twenty-second, and Twenty-third Regular Sessions). At the end of his political career Hanna represented Marion County in the Indiana Senate: 1840–41 (Twenty-fifty Regular Session) and 1842–46.

== Death and legacy ==
Hanna was hit and instantly killed by a train locomotive as he was walking along the Peru and Indianapolis Railroad track in Indianapolis on November 16, 1858. His remains are interred at Crown Hill Cemetery in Indianapolis (Section 2, Lot 131).

Hanna is remembered for his public service as the Franklin County sheriff during the final years of Indiana's territorial government and as one of the county's elected delegates to the 1816 Indiana Constitutional Convention. Hanna became a leader in the state militia in the early years of Indiana's statehood and worked as a registrar in the federal land office. His political career included an appointment to the U.S. Senate and several years as a representative of Marion County in the upper and lower houses of the state legislature.

== Notes ==
U.S. Senate
Preceded by James Noble	U.S. senator (Class 1) from Indiana; 1831–1832; Served alongside: William Hendricks	Succeeded by John Tipton
