= Samuel Merrill (Indiana politician) =

American politician (1792–1855)

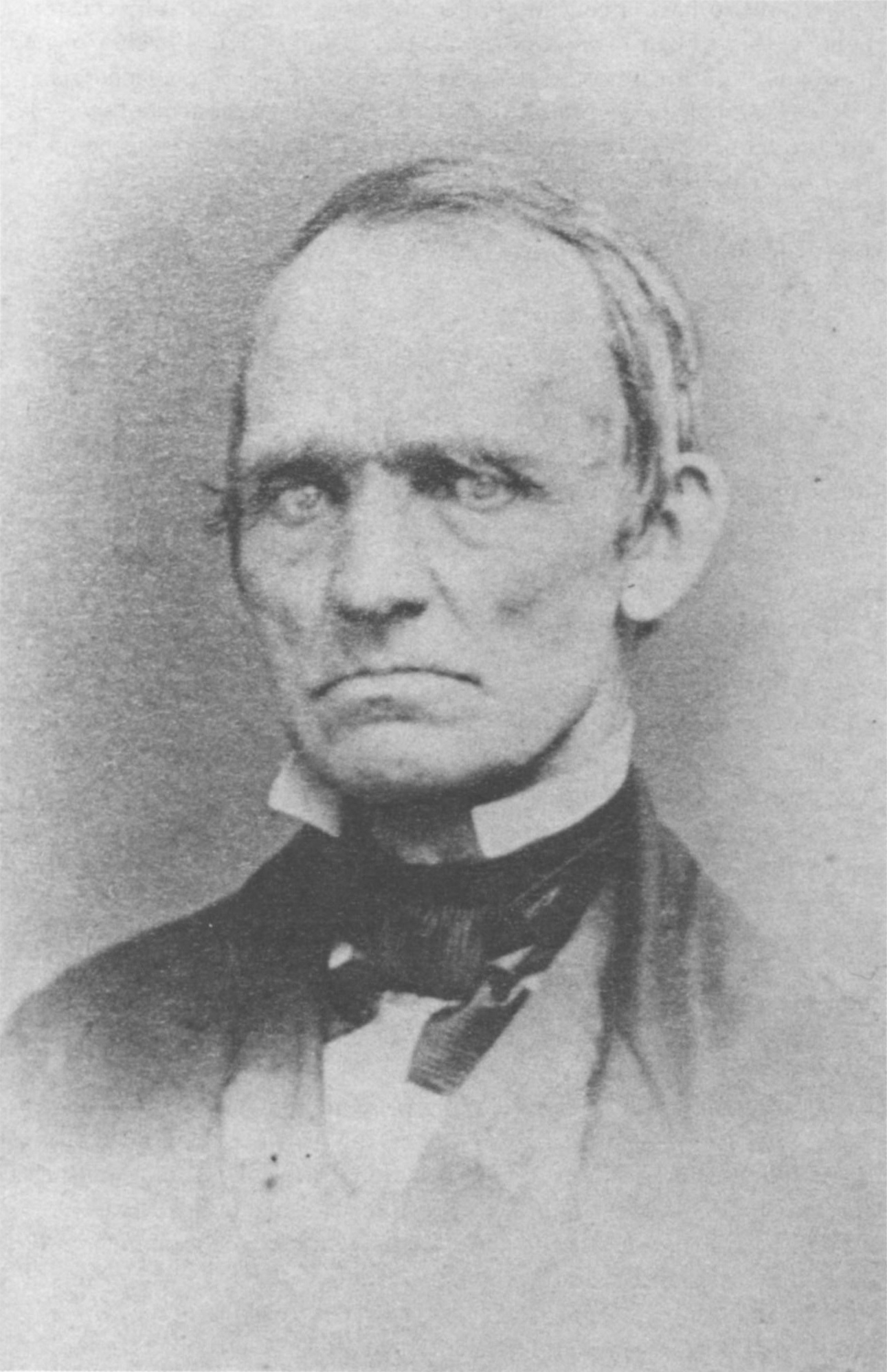

Member of the Indiana General Assembly for Switzerland County
- In office December 6, 1819 – December 2, 1822
- Preceded by: Ralph Cotton
- Succeeded by: William B. Chamberlain

Indiana State Treasurer
- In office 1822 – February 10, 1834
- Governor: William Hendricks; James B. Ray; Noah Noble
- Preceded by: Daniel Crosby Lane
- Succeeded by: Nathan B. Palmer

Personal details
- Born: October 29, 1792 Peacham, Vermont, U.S.
- Died: August 24, 1855 (aged 62) Indianapolis, Indiana, U.S.
- Spouse(s): Lydia Jane Anderson (m. 1818–47); Elizabeth Young (m. 1849– )
- Children: ten, including Catharine Merrill

Samuel Merrill (October 29, 1792 – August 24, 1855), a native of Peacham, Vermont, was an early lawyer and leading citizen of Indiana, who served as state treasurer from 1822 to 1834. Merrill attended Dartmouth College, and in 1816 settled in Vevay, Indiana, where he established a law practice and served in the Indiana General Assembly as a representative from Switzerland County (1821–22). Merrill resigned his position as state treasurer in 1834 to become the president of the State Bank of Indiana (1834–44); he also served as the president of the Madison and Indianapolis Railroad Company (1844–48) and head of the Merrill Publishing Company, which later became the Bobbs-Merrill Company. In addition to his government service and business ventures, Merrill was the second president of the Indiana Historical Society (1835–48), a founder and trustee of Wabash College, and an elder in the Second Presbyterian and Fourth Presbyterian churches in Indianapolis.

== Early life and education ==
Merrill was born on October 29, 1792, in Peacham, Vermont, the second son of Jesse and Priscilla (Kimball) Merrill. Jesse Merrill was a farmer and town officer who also served for years as a member of the Vermont legislature; his wife, Priscilla, was a homemaker and the mother of seven children (six boys and one girl).

Merrill received his early education at Peacham Academy and attended Dartmouth College, but left before graduating. In 1813 Merrill followed his older brother, James, to York, Pennsylvania, where he spent three years studying law and teaching school. In 1816, at the age of twenty-four, Merrill settled in Vevay, Switzerland County, Indiana. After his admission to the bar in 1817, Merrell established a law practice in Vevay.

== Marriage and family ==
In 1818 Merrill married Lydia Jane Anderson, the daughter of Robert and Catherine (Dumont) Anderson of Vevay. Samuel and Lydia Jane Merrill had ten children: Jane (1819–1911, mother of William A. Ketcham), Pricilla, Catharine "Kate" (1824–1900), Julia Dumont, Samuel Jr., Mary, Anna Maria "Mina", and three others (Sophia, "Jimmie," and Elizabeth) who died young. Merrill's wife, Lydia Jane, died in 1847. In 1849 he married Elizabeth Young of Madison, Indiana.

== Career ==
Merrill's career included government service as a representative in the Indiana General Assembly (1821–22) and as the Indiana State Treasurer (1822–34). He was also involved in banking and other business ventures. Merrill was president of State Bank of Indiana (1834–44) and the Madison and Indianapolis Railroad Company (1844–48). He also owned an Indianapolis bookstore and publishing company that later became the Bobbs-Merrill Company.

=== State legislator and treasurer ===
Merrill moved to Vevay, Indiana, in 1816, and was elected to the Indiana General Assembly in 1821 as the representative of Switzerland County. While serving in the state legislature, Merrill was elected as Indiana State Treasurer. He succeeded Daniel Crosby Lane as state treasurer on December 28, 1822. Merrill moved to Corydon, Indiana, and was reelected for three more consecutive terms, serving until February 10, 1834, when Nathan B. Palmer succeeded him.

After the decision was made to relocate the seat of state government on January 20, 1824, Merrill had a role in helping to the name the new state capital. He seconded the motion to adopt the name of Indianapolis for the state capital of Indiana. Merrill also oversaw the transfer of the state treasury and state government's records to Indianapolis from Corydon. The arduous task included Merrill's and his young family's eleven-day journey of about 160 miles (260 km) by horseback and wagon caravan from Corydon to the new state capital in November 1824. To complicate matters, no paved road existed along the caravan's path at that time and in some places a trail had to be cut through the dense forests in order to move northward.

Merrill's caravan of four, four-horse wagons and two or three saddle horses brought the state treasury, governmental records, a printing press, and furniture for the Indiana General Assembly, the Indiana Supreme Court, and the state's executive offices, as well as two families, including his own, their personal goods, and implements and supplies for the caravan. He also arranged for the transfer of the state archives and state library to Indianapolis. After relocating to Indianapolis, Merrill and his family lived in a two-story brick building, later demolished, that the state government had constructed at the southwest corner of Washington Street and present-day Capitol Avenue to house the state treasurer's office and residence, as well as the state auditor's office.

Merrill continued to serve as state treasurer until 1834, when he was named president of the State Bank of Indiana. He was also a partner in the trading firm of Yandes and Merrill and was active in other business ventures and civic affairs.

=== Bank president ===
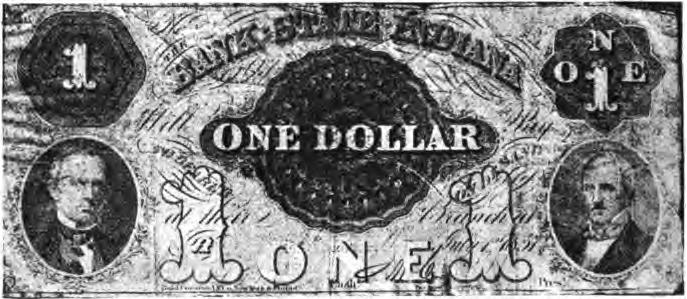
A one dollar bank note from the Bank of Indiana featuring a portrait engraving of Merrill (left)

When the State Bank of Indiana was founded in 1834, the Indiana General Assembly choose Samuel Merrill as the bank's first president. Following his appointment, Merrill resigned his position of state treasurer. The Indianapolis News reported on July 15, 1911: "His honesty and splendid record made him a man to inspire confidence in the bank." Merrill visited all thirteen of the bank's branches twice each year, traveling on horseback to personally examine their accounts and ledgers. It was said that he was able to review columns of figures with machine-like rapidity and accuracy.

=== Railroad company president ===
Merrill served as president of the Madison and Indianapolis Railroad Company from 1844 to 1848. The state legislature initially established it as a state-owned railroad on January 27, 1836, as one of the first rail lines in the state. The railroad was salvaged following the collapse of the state's internal improvement programs and transferred to private ownership on June 20, 1842.

With additional funding from investors in the East, Merrill expanded the railroad to complete the line, which extended from Madison, Indiana, to Indianapolis. More track was laid during his first two years as president than had been done in the previous ten years of its state-owned management. Merrill resigned from the railroad in 1848 after disagreements with H. R. Hall, the rail line's superintendent.

=== Publisher ===
In 1840 Merrill authored and published Chamberlain's Gazetteer of Indiana. The following year he bought Hood and Noble's bookstore, one of four bookstores located in Indianapolis at that time, and oversaw its merger with his publishing business.

After Merrill's death in 1855, ownership of the Merrill Publishing Company passed to his son, Samuel Merrill Jr. After a merger with Bowen Stewart and Company in 1885, it became known as the Bowen-Merrill Company; in 1903 the firm was renamed the Bobbs-Merrill Company.

== Other interests ==
In addition to his banking and business ventures, Merrill, a temperance and abolitionist, was interested in education and religious work.

Merrill was an early president of the Temperance Society of Indianapolis and a leader of the State Colonization Society. He was also an outspoken abolitionist. On one occasion, a pro-slavery man entered the Indianapolis branch of the State Bank of Indiana and challenged Merrill to a fist-fight, which Merrill won.

Because of his interest in education, Merrill helped to establish Wabash College in 1833 and served as a trustee. Merrill also taught school in York, Pennsylvania, and on occasion in Vevay, Indiana, and served as the superintendent of Sunday Schools for Indianapolis's Second Presbyterian and Fourth Presbyterian churches. Merrill was also an elder in the Second and Fourth Presbyterian churches, the latter of which he helped establish in 1851. In addition, Merrill served as the second president of the Indiana Historical Society (1835–48).

== Death and legacy ==
Merrill died on August 24, 1855, in Indianapolis at the age of sixty-two.

Merrill was known among his contemporaries as an able businessman and for his sound judgment and attention to detail. Although Merrill was not a skilled orator, he was an avid storyteller and a valued counselor to his peers. Merrill was a modest individual, but he could also be impulsive in his actions and outspoken in expressing his opinions.

As a public servant, Merrill oversaw the successful transfer in 1824 of the state treasury, state library, and state archives, which remain at Indianapolis, the permanent seat of Indiana's state government. He was also successful in banking, the railroad industry, and publishing. Merrill became the first president of the State Bank of Indiana, which continued to operate until 1859, and a president of the Madison and Indianapolis Railroad Company, provider of an early rail transportation link to Indianapolis. He also founded the Merrill Publishing Company, which later became known as the Bobbs-Merrill Company. The publishing company's backlist of titles and publishing rights were sold to Macmillan Company in 1985.

Merrill was also an early civic leader, serving as the second president of the Indiana Historical Society, whose headquarters remain in Indianapolis. He was also a founder and trustee of Wabash College, which continues to operate in Crawfordsville, Indiana; and served as an elder in two of Indianapolis's Presbyterian congregations. The Second Presbyterian Church is located on North Meridian Street; the Fourth Presbyterian Church later merged with other congregations.

== Honors and tributes ==
The State Bank of Indiana featured an engraved image of Merrill on the front of its one dollar bank note in the late 1850s.

== See also ==
- History of Indiana

== Notes ==
Political offices
Preceded by Daniel Crosby Lane	Treasurer of Indiana; 1822–1834	Succeeded by Nathan B. Palmer
