= New Columbus =

New Columbus may refer to:

- New Columbus, Indiana
- New Columbus, Pennsylvania
