= Governor Ray =

Governor Ray may refer to:

- Dixy Lee Ray (1914–1994), 17th Governor of Washington
- James B. Ray (1794–1848), 4th Governor of Indiana
- Robert D. Ray (1928–2018), 38th Governor of Iowa
