= Markleville =

Markleville may refer to:

- Markleville, former name of Markleeville, California
- Markleville, Indiana
