= Pendleton Historic District =

Pendleton Historic District may refer to:

- Pendleton Historic District (Pendleton, Indiana), listed on the NRHP in Indiana
- Pendleton Historic District (Pendleton, South Carolina), listed on the NRHP in South Carolina
