= Catharine Merrill =

American educator, author, Civil War nurse

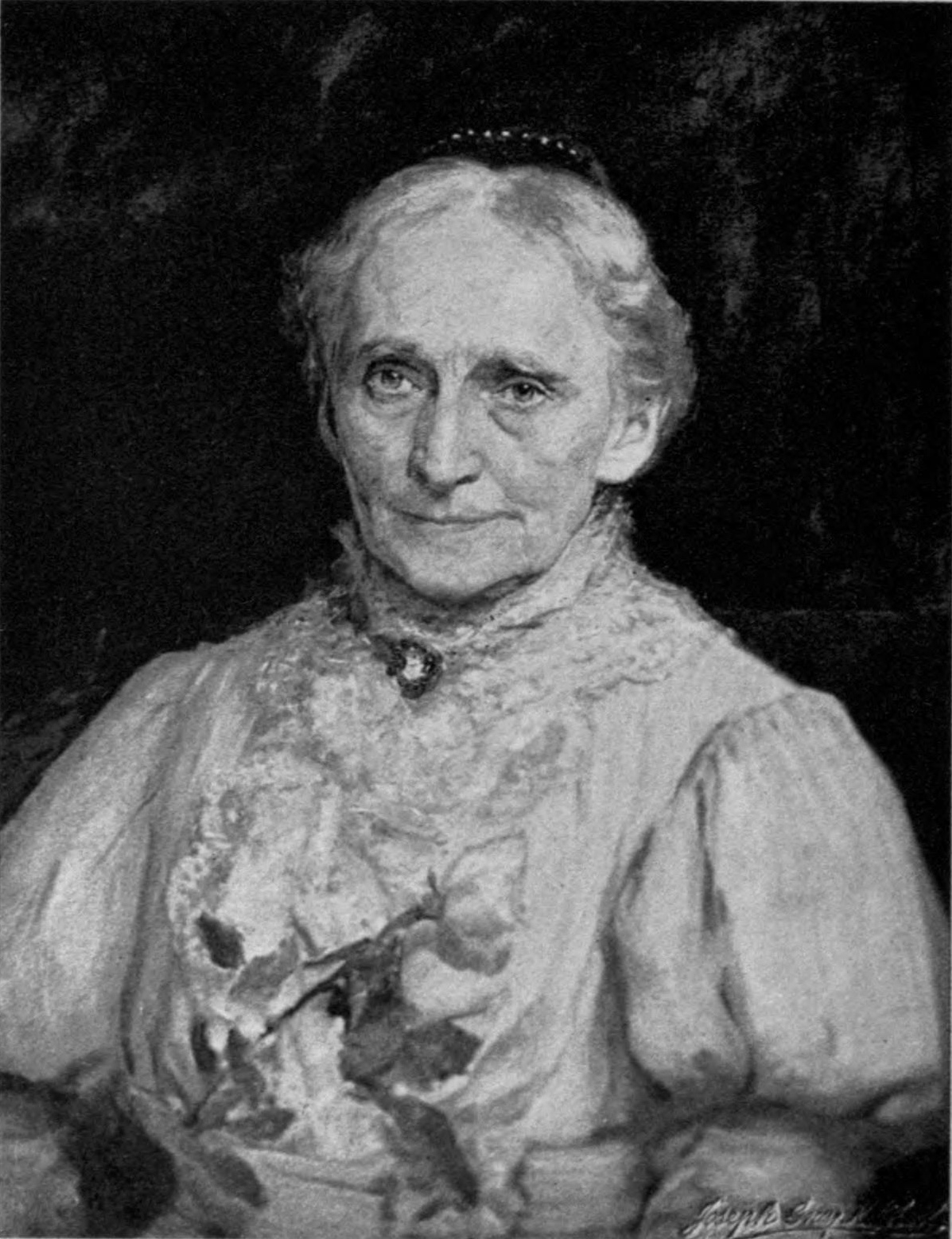
- 1898 portrait
- Born: January 24, 1824; Corydon, Indiana, US
- Died: May 30, 1900 (aged 76); Indianapolis, Indiana, US
- Occupations: Educator, writer, and American Civil War nurse
- Employer: Butler University (1869–83)
- Notable work: The Soldier of Indiana in the War for the Union (1866, 1869)
- Parent(s): Samuel and Lydia Jane (Anderson) Merrill

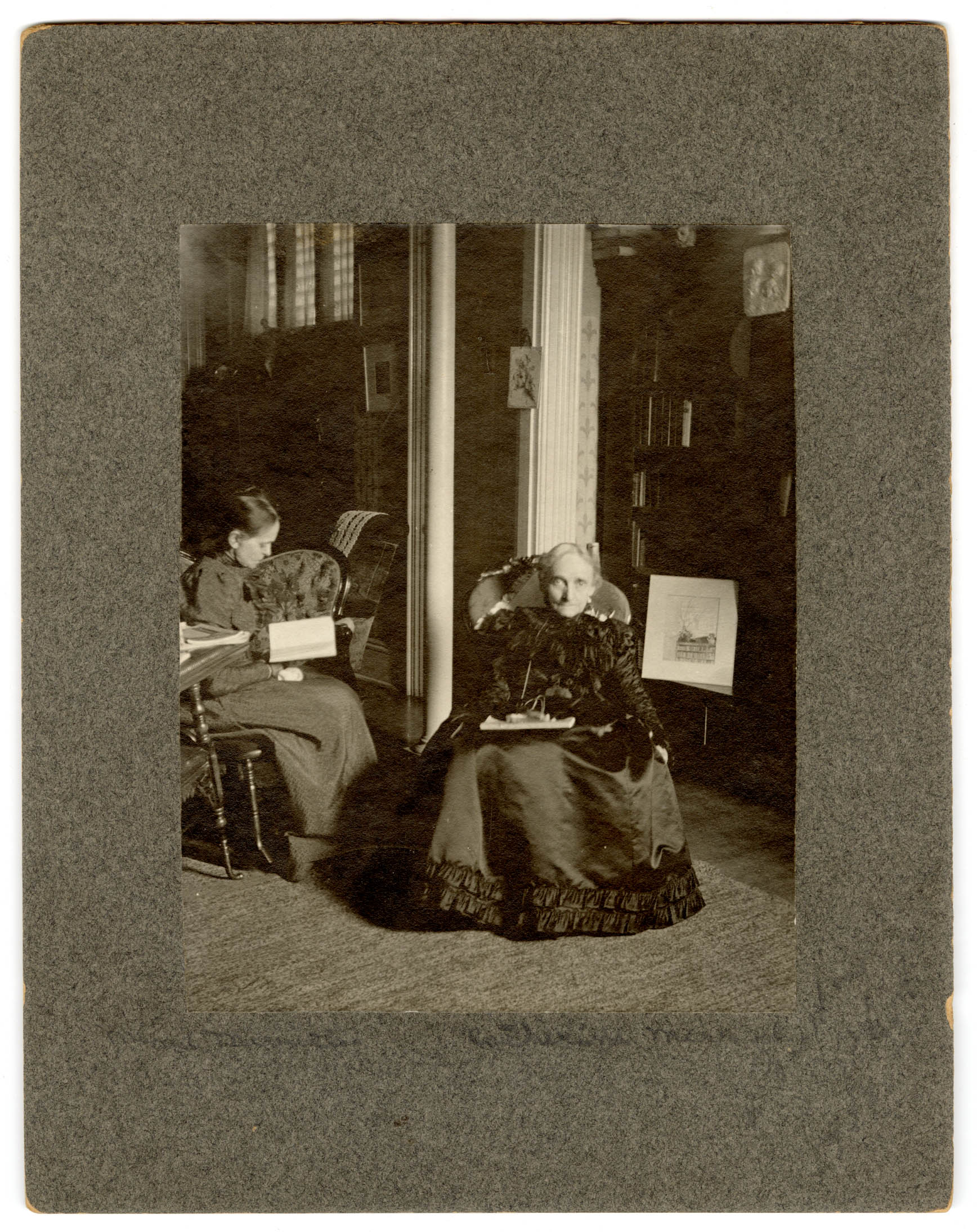
Catharine Merrill seated next to her sister

Catharine Merrill (January 24, 1824 – May 30, 1900) was an American educator, writer, and American Civil War nurse from Indiana who became the second female university professor in the United States. She is best remembered as a talented educator and admired for her modesty and kindness. In 1869, Merrill accepted the appointment as the first Demia Butler Chair of English Literature at North Western Christian University, now known as Butler University, and began her fourteen-year career as a university professor during the 1869–70 academic year. Merrill resigned the professorship in 1883, but continued to offer private instruction at her home until shortly before her death. In addition to becoming a teacher, Merrill was a published author, although it was not her primary goal. Articles describing her travels in Europe from 1859 to 1861 were published in Indiana newspapers. She also anonymously wrote The Soldier of Indiana in the War for the Union (1866, 1869). The Man Shakespeare and Other Essays (1902) was published posthumously. Merrill is buried at Crown Hill Cemetery in Indianapolis.

Well known and respected in academia and Indianapolis's social circles, Merrill was active in civic groups. She cofounded the Indianapolis Home for Friendless Women in 1867 and served on its board. The Catharine Merrill Club, an Indianapolis literary organization established in 1885, was named in her honor; Indianapolis Public Schools renamed Public School Number 25 the Catharine Merrill School in 1900; and Merrill's friends and former students endowed Butler University's Catharine Merrill Chair of English in 1907 (the endowment lapsed in 1930).

== Early life and education ==
Merrill was born on January 24, 1824, in Corydon, Indiana, to Samuel and Lydia Jane (Anderson) Merrill. Her father, a native of Vermont who attended Dartmouth College, was an early leading citizen of Indiana. He moved to Vevay, Indiana, in 1816, and served in the Indiana General Assembly (1819–1822) and as Indiana's first state treasurer (1822–1834). Samuel was responsible for moving the state treasury to the new state capital at Indianapolis in 1824; his young family, which included nine-month-old Catharine, joined him on the journey.

Catharine, nicknamed Kate, was the third of ten children. Merrill's mother died in 1847 and an older sister died two years later. Merrill's father married Elizabeth Young of Madison, Indiana, in 1849; he died in 1855. During this period, Catharine helped care for her younger siblings. Other members of the extended family also lived with the Merrills from time-to-time.

Catharine joined the First Presbyterian Church in Indianapolis on May 18, 1838, at the age of fourteen, and was among the fifteen members who withdrew on November 19, 1838, to organize the city's Second Presbyterian Church. Merrill later became a founding member of Indianapolis's Fourth Presbyterian Church.

Merrill's education was more extensive than was typical for women and girls of her era. Her father established a school at the family home in Indianapolis, where she was among his early students. She also attended the Indianapolis Female Institute, which opened on June 14, 1837. From 1859 to 1861 Catharine and a younger sister, Mina, took an extended trip to Europe, where Catharine studied literature in Germany. Shortly after the outbreak of the American Civil War, the two women returned to the United States.

== Career ==
Merrill pursued a lifelong career as an educator, but she also served as a nurse during the American Civil War. These two occupations were typical for unmarried women at that time and Merrill excelled at both. She also became a writer.

=== Educator ===
Merrill began her teaching career at the private school her father founded in the family's home at Indianapolis, and assumed full responsibility for the school as he turned to other business pursuits. As the school's enrollment increased, it moved to the basement of the Fourth Presbyterian Church at Market and Delaware Streets. Later, it relocated to other sites in the city and became known as "Miss Merrill's School".

In the mid-1850s, Merrill also taught at other schools in Indiana and Ohio. She served as headmistress and taught at a female school in Crawfordsville, Indiana, for about a year, and taught at the Female Seminary in Cleveland, Ohio, before returning to Indianapolis.

=== Civil War nurse ===
In June 1861, Merrill sailed to the United States after an extended stay in Europe, arriving in Indianapolis on July 5, 1861. By October, she was serving as a nurse. Merrill cared for soldiers at hospitals in Indianapolis and Kentucky. By the war's end in 1865, she had returned to Indianapolis to resume teaching at her school, which other local women had run for Merrill during her absence.

=== University professor ===
In 1869, Ovid Butler endowed the Demia Butler Chair of English Literature at North Western Christian University, now known as Butler University, in honor of his daughter, a graduate of the university who had died in 1867. Butler endowed the chair, which still exists, on the condition that a woman would always retain the position. It was the first endowed chair at an American university designated for a female professor. Merrill accepted the appointment on April 21, 1869, and began teaching at Butler's campus on Indianapolis's near northside in the 1869–70 academic year. Merrill became the second female university professor in the country, preceded by Maria Mitchell at Vassar College the previous year. Merrill taught at Butler for fourteen years. According to the university's 2015–17 academic bulletin, Merrill was a pioneer in the use of new teaching methods, introducing the lecture method in her literature courses, a "first for any subject other than science."

In 1875, when the university moved to a new site in the suburban community of Irvington and changed its name to Butler, Merrill initially commuted to Irvington from her home in Indianapolis, but took up temporary residence in homes closer to the campus after the journey proved too time-consuming. Merrill, who loved the outdoors, enjoyed frequent walks in what became known as Irvington's Christian Park. She resigned from the professorship at Butler in 1883.

=== Writer ===
Merrill became a writer, but it was not her main goal. Articles describing her travels in Europe from 1859 to 1861 regularly appeared in the Indianapolis Journal and the Lafayette Journal. Motivated by a sense of patriotic duty after the Civil War, Merrill wrote The Soldier of Indiana in the War for the Union (2 volumes, 1866, 1869), a history of Indiana soldiers' wartime experiences, at the request of Indiana governor Oliver P. Morton. Because of Merrill's modesty, the work was published with no mention of her as its author. Merrill, who was not a trained historian, preferred to spotlight the sacrifices of the soldiers.

The Man Shakespeare and Other Essays (1902), a memorial collection of her written works, was published posthumously. Naturalist John Muir, Merrill's longtime friend, wrote Words from an Old Friend, which is included in the book, as a tribute to her.

=== Community servant ===
Well known and respected in academia and in the city's social circles, Merrill was active in civic groups, delivered public lectures, and served on various committees.

In 1867, Merrill and Jane Chambers McKinney Graydon cofounded the Indianapolis Home for Friendless Women to aid women who were destitute, including penniless widows and former prostitutes. Merrill served on its board for many years.

== Later years ==
Following her retirement from Butler University in 1883, Merrill continued to teach literature, offering private lessons at her home.

== Death and legacy ==
Merrill died at home in Indianapolis on May 30, 1900.

Merrill is remembered for her rare abilities as an educator. Admired for her kindness, "single-mindedness and determination," she lived quietly and did not seek fame. Merrill's long life and career as an educator, nurse, and college professor, opened doors for other women.

== Honors and tributes ==
- Butler University conferred on Merrill an honorary Master of Arts degree in 1871.
- A group of local women, many of whom were Merrill's former students, founded the Catharine Merrill Club in 1885 and named it in her honor. In 1889 the club commissioned Hoosier Group artist T. C. Steele to paint Merrill's portrait and gave it to her as a gift. The painting was later donated to Butler University.
- The Indianapolis Public Schools named Public School Number 25, located on the site of the Merrill family homestead, the Catharine Merrill School in 1900.
- Merrill's friends and former students endowed Butler's Catharine Merrill Chair of English in 1907 (the endowment lapsed in 1930).

== Published works ==
- The Soldier of Indiana in the War for the Union (Indianapolis: Merrill and Company, 1866, 1869) Two volumes
- The Man Shakespeare and Other Essays (Indianapolis: Bowen-Merrill, 1902)
