= Markleville, Indiana =

- Town
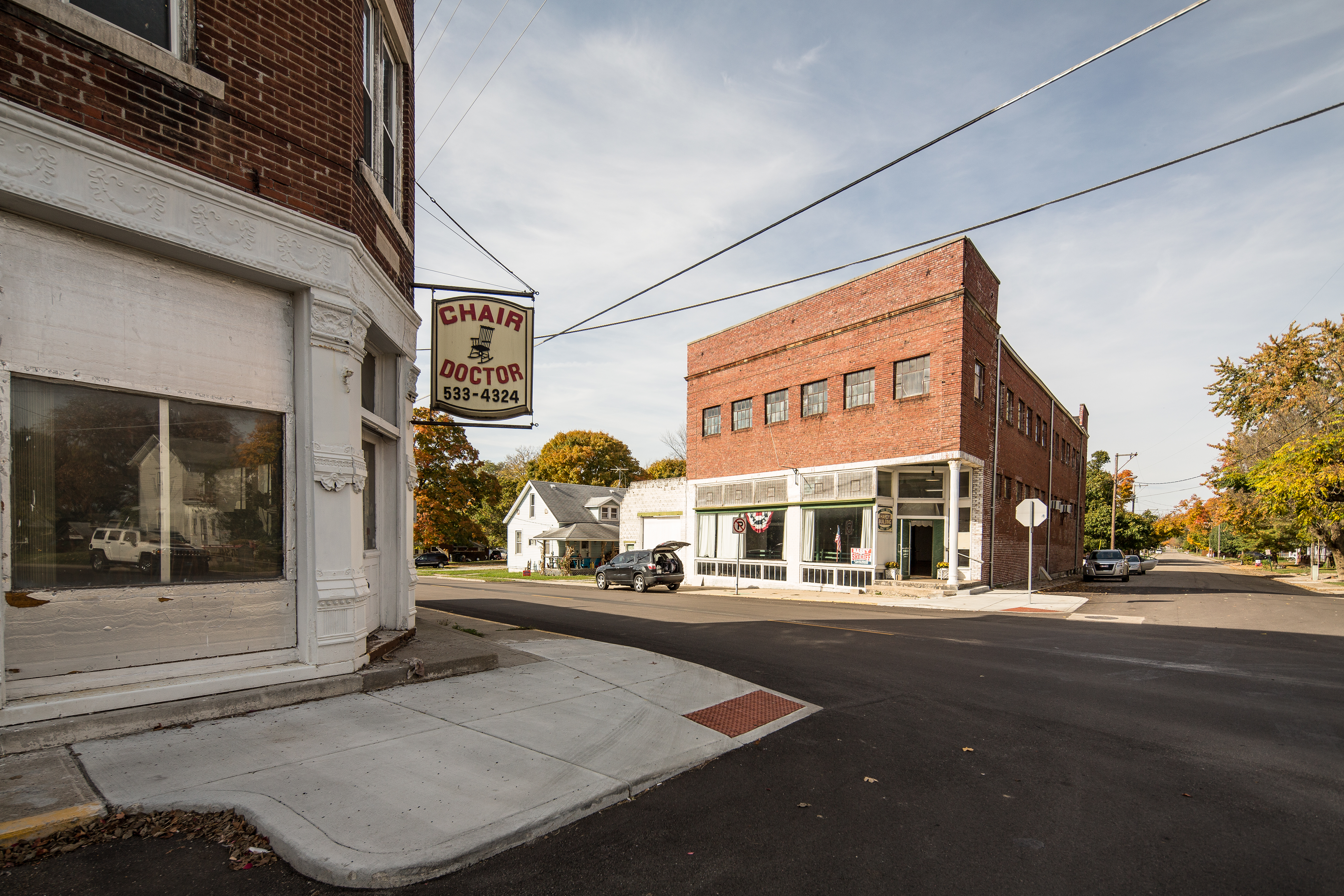
- Intersection of Main Street (SR 38) and State Street in center of town

- Seal

- Location in Madison County, Indiana
- Coordinates: 39°58′46″N 85°37′26″W
- Country: United States
- State: Indiana
- County: Madison
- Township: Adams

Area
  - Total: 0.56 sq mi (1.44 km^{2})
  - Land: 0.56 sq mi (1.44 km^{2})
  - Water: 0 sq mi (0.00 km^{2})
- Elevation: 955 ft (291 m)

Population (2020)
  - Total: 484
  - Estimate (2025): 490 ▲
  - Density: 868.4/sq mi (335.28/km^{2})
- Time zone: UTC-5 (Eastern (EST))
  - Summer (DST): UTC-4 (EDT)
- ZIP code: 46056
- Area code: 765
- FIPS code: 18-47178
- GNIS feature ID: 2396737
- Website: www.markleville.in.gov

Markleville is a town in Adams Township, Madison County, Indiana, United States. It is part of the Indianapolis–Carmel–Anderson metropolitan statistical area. The population was 484 at the 2020 census.

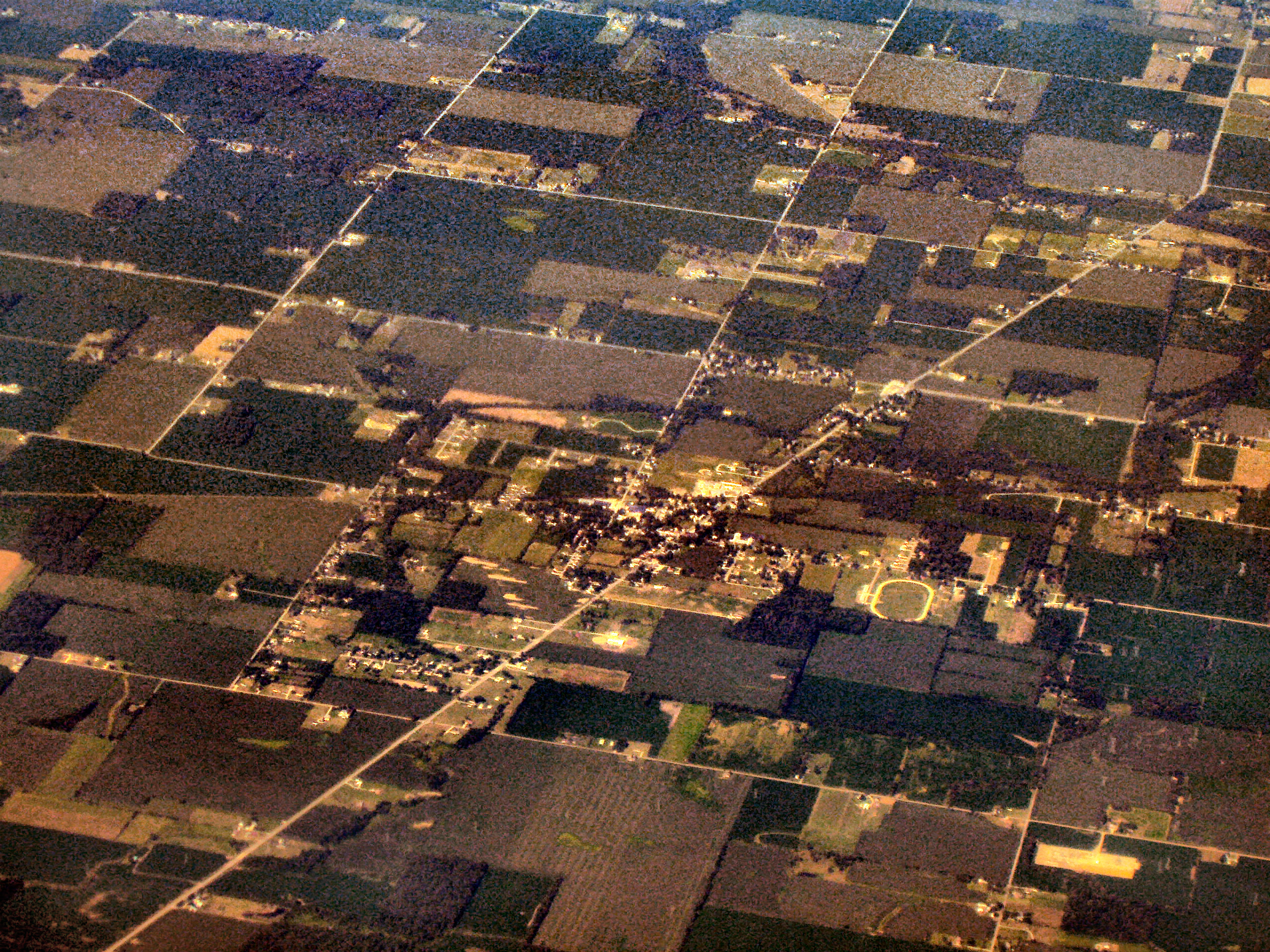
Markleville from the air, looking west

== History ==
Markleville was laid out by John Markle in 1852, and named after him. It was incorporated as a town in 1912.

The site of the Fall Creek Massacre, chronicled by Jessamyn West in her novel Massacre at Fall Creek, is located about a mile from Markleville. A historical marker located just east of Markleville on State Road 38 tells the story of the massacre. In 1824, four men named Hudson, Sawyer, John T. Bridge Sr. and John Bridge Jr. were tried and sentenced to death for the murders of eight members of a small group of Seneca Indians, including women and children.

All were publicly hanged except for 18-year-old John Bridge Jr., who was pardoned on the gallows in person by Indiana Governor J. Brown Ray because of his age. This was the first time in U.S. history that white men were subjected to capital punishment for the murder of Native Americans.

== Geography ==
Markleville is located in southeastern Madison County. Indiana State Road 38 passes through the center of town as Main Street, leading west-northwest 7 miles (11 km) to Pendleton and east-southeast 14 miles (23 km) to New Castle. Anderson, the Madison county seat, is 10 miles (16 km) north of Markleville.

According to the U.S. Census Bureau, Markleville has a total area of 0.56 square miles (1.45 km^{2}), all land. The town is drained by tributaries of Lick Creek, which flows northward past the west side of town then turns southwest to join Fall Creek, a tributary of the White River, west of Ingalls.

== Demographics ==
Historical population
Census	Pop.	Note	%±
1870	83		—
1880	112		34.9%
1930	251		—
1940	266		6.0%
1950	314		18.0%
1960	402		28.0%
1970	457		13.7%
1980	427		−6.6%
1990	412		−3.5%
2000	383		−7.0%
2010	528		37.9%
2020	484		−8.3%
2025 (est.)	490	▲	1.2%
U.S. Decennial Census

=== 2010 census ===
As of the census of 2010, there were 528 people, 196 households, and 142 families living in the town. The population density was 942.9 inhabitants per square mile (364.1/km^{2}). There were 210 housing units at an average density of 375.0 per square mile (144.8/km^{2}). The racial makeup of the town was 97.9% White, 0.2% African-American, 0.2% Asian, 0.6% from other races, and 1.1% from two or more races. Hispanic or Latino of any race were 0.9% of the population.

There were 196 households, of which 38.8% had children under the age of 18 living with them. 58.2% were married couples living together.10.7% had a female householder with no husband present, 3.6% had a male householder with no wife present, and 27.6% were non-families. 22.4% of all households were made up of individuals, and 10.7% had someone living alone who was 65 years of age or older. The average household size was 2.69 and the average family size was 3.15.

The median age in the town was 35.7 years. 28.6% of residents were under the age of 18; 5.1% were between the ages of 18 and 24; 30.3% were from 25 to 44; 23% were from 45 to 64; and 13.1% were 65 years of age or older. The gender makeup of the town was 48.9% male and 51.1% female.

=== 2000 census ===
As of the census of 2000, there were 383 people, 141 households, and 111 families living in the town. The population density was 943.7 inhabitants per square mile (364.4/km^{2}). There were 149 housing units at an average density of 367.1 per square mile (141.7/km^{2}). The racial makeup of the town was 99.74% White, and 0.26% from two or more races.

There were 141 households, out of which 31.2% had children under the age of 18 living with them, 67.4% were married couples living together, 8.5% had a female householder with no husband present, and 20.6% were non-families. 16.3% of all households were made up of individuals, and 9.2% had someone living alone who was 65 years of age or older. The average household size was 2.72 and the average family size was 3.02.

In the town, the population was spread out, with 24.5% under the age of 18, 6.8% from 18 to 24, 28.7% from 25 to 44, 27.2% from 45 to 64, and 12.8% who were 65 years of age or older. The median age was 38 years. For every 100 females, there were 96.4 males. For every 100 females age 18 and over, there were 105.0 males.

The median income for a household in the town was $48,438, and the median income for a family was $50,313. Males had a median income of $30,781 versus $22,981 for females. The per capita income for the town was $17,395. None of the families and 0.8% of the population were living below the poverty line, including no under eighteens and none of those over 64.

== Education ==
It is in the South Madison Community School Corporation.
