= Bank of Indiana =

American state bank from 1833 to 1859

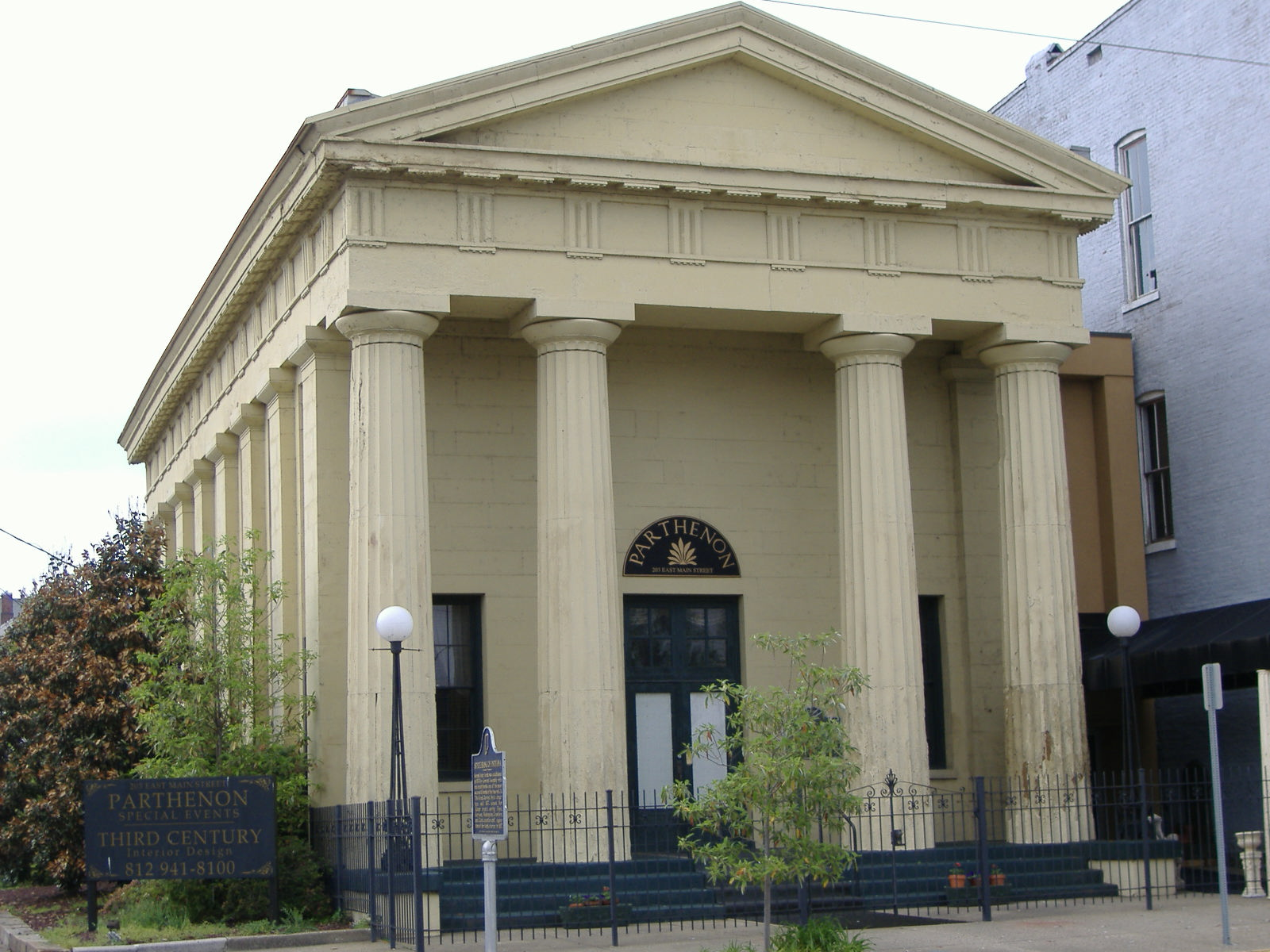
The New Albany branch building for the Bank of Indiana

The state Bank of Indiana was a government chartered banking institution established in 1833 in response to the state's shortage of capital caused by the closure of the Second Bank of the United States by the administration of President Andrew Jackson. The bank operated for twenty-six years and allowed the state to finance its internal improvements, stabilized the state's currency problems, and encouraged greater private economic growth. The bank closed in 1859. The profits were then split between the shareholders, allowing depositors to exchange their bank notes for federal notes, and the bank's buildings and infrastructure were sold and reincorporated as the privately owned Second Bank of Indiana.

== Background ==
The Indiana Territorial legislature had charted two banks in 1813. With no other established banks operating in Indiana, they were the first attempt by the government to bring banking and a standard currency to the young territory. The banks were granted twenty-year charters, but they quickly fell into financial difficulties following the Panic of 1819. By 1823, both banks had folded. Without any banks in the state, the government and the citizens came to rely on the use of notes issued from the Second Bank of the United States.

In 1832, President Andrew Jackson vetoed a bill to extend the charter of the Second Bank of the United States and removed federal deposits, forcing it to cease most operations by 1833 due to a lack of reserve cash. The result caused a shortage of hard money (coin) at a critical time in Indiana's development. The state had just begun a large series of internal improvements and was funding the projects with millions of dollars of loans. The sudden hard money shortage required the use of paper money to pay maintenance on the state's debt, but with the closure of the national bank there was no means by which the state could easily obtain paper money.

The looming crisis became a major political issue in the state's 1833 election campaign. That year a Whig majority was elected to the Indiana General Assembly. They responded to the problem by passing legislation to establish the Bank of Indiana with the intention that the bank would be able to issue paper money and help to finance the state's debt. The bill was drafted by Samuel Hannah and was enacted into law on January 28, 1834.

== Formation of the bank ==
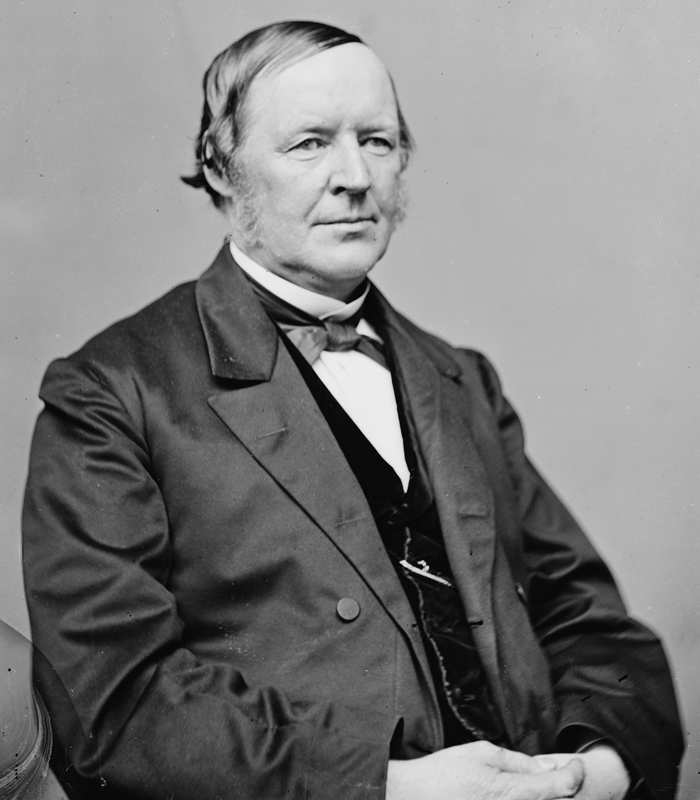
Hugh McCulloch, President of the Bank of Indiana and United States Secretary of the Treasury.

On February 13, the seven member board of directors met to begin organizing the bank. The board of directors included James Lanier, who would personally benefit from the bank the greatest. They elected James M. Ray as cashier. The state created a charter for the new bank similar to the one used by the national bank. There were some modifications to make the bank better fit the needs of Indiana including limiting the bank to thirteen branches, and promising to allow no other bank to be established in the state. The directors choose to establish branches in Indianapolis, Lawrenceburg, Richmond, Madison, New Albany, Vincennes, Bedford, Terre Haute, and Lafayette. A Fort Wayne branch was added in 1835 and branches in South Bend and Michigan City in 1836.

Each branch had an initial investment of $160,000, at first there were only ten branches and the total bank's value was $1.6 million. The start up money was all hard money in Spanish and Mexican silver dollars. The money was raised by issuing stock sold at $50 per share. Half of the stock was to be purchased by the state and the other half was sold to the public. By May 20, 1834, all the public stock for the new bank had been issued. The state allowed the public stock to be sold at $18.75 per share, with the other $31.25 being financed on the state's credit, until the purchaser could pay the full amount back to the state with 6% interest. On August 6, the state completed its purchase of 50% of the bank's stock. The money to purchase the stock came through the sale and mortgage of thousands of acres of public land. On November 19 Governor Noah Noble declared the bank open for business.

Hugh McCulloch, who served under four presidents as United States Secretary of the Treasury, begin his career in banking at the Bank of Indiana. He was one of the few prominent businessmen in the young state, but had no experience in banking. He was chosen as president of the bank by the directors because he was "better fitted for the place than anybody else whose services they could obtain", he was the best they could get. Indiana was still a virtual wilderness inhabited by roving bands of American Indians and not at all appealing to the professional bankers of the east.

In its initial report to the shareholders, the bank reported that it held deposits of $127,236, had $456,065 of paper cash in circulation, $751,083 of cash on hand, and another $78,150 invested in other banks. This showed the bank to be in excellent financial health and to have a promising future.

== Operation ==
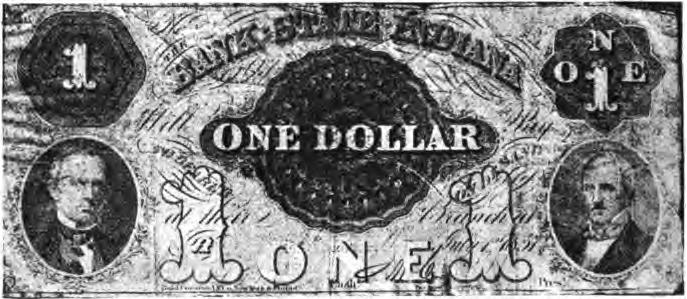
An 1857 one-dollar bank note from the Bank of Indiana. Portraits are of Hugh McCulloch and Samuel Merrill.

The bank charter had various clauses to help prevent possible insolvency and reduce risks. Bank officers were not permitted to receive loans at a rate different from that offered to the public. The bank could not issue securities on its own stock, and any loan over $500 had to be approved by five-sevenths of banks board members. Any losses were to be paid by the individual shareholders up to an amount equal to their stock value. At it highest point, in 1851, the bank had $4 million of bank notes in circulation and $2 million in specie reserves. The bank was an early success. Many who had purchased the stock on credit found that the dividends paid out exceeded the interest they were charged, and by the time the bank's charter expired almost all of the public stock had been paid for with investors receiving as much a 650% return on investment when the bank closed.

The state used the bank to continue financing its internal improvements. They issued bank bonds that were sold on the London exchange. The state miscalculated on the amount of credit they could afford, and by 1841 the state was on the edge of bankruptcy, having borrowed more than $10 million, equivalent to the state's previous fifteen years of tax revenue. In response to the bankruptcy crisis, the state sent James Lanier to London to negotiate with the bondholders. The negotiations led the state to liquidate all of its public works, except the Wabash and Erie Canal, turning them over to the creditors in exchange for the bonds being reduced 50% in value. The result was a large negative impact to the state's credit, but the cut in the bond value allowed the state to pay off the debt before the bank charter expired.

The profits the state made from the bank were large; by owning 50% of the bank, and then devaluing the state debts by 50%, the bank was able to turn a high profit. The state received at least a 500% return on investment, but the profit was less than half the amount lost on the internal improvements, most of which were never completed or quickly fell into disrepair and became unusable. The state's profits were small in comparison to the enterprise spurred by the bank. With the ready availability of capital at low rates of interest, small business sprung up across the state finally transformed Indiana's mostly barter system into a cash system of trade.

With the state's credit ruined, the onset of the Mexican–American War found Indiana in a poor condition to finance the regiments it needed to send in support of the war effort. With no other creditor willing to lend the state money, each of the branches was asked to furnish a loan of $10,000 for the effort and all came through with the money for the request.

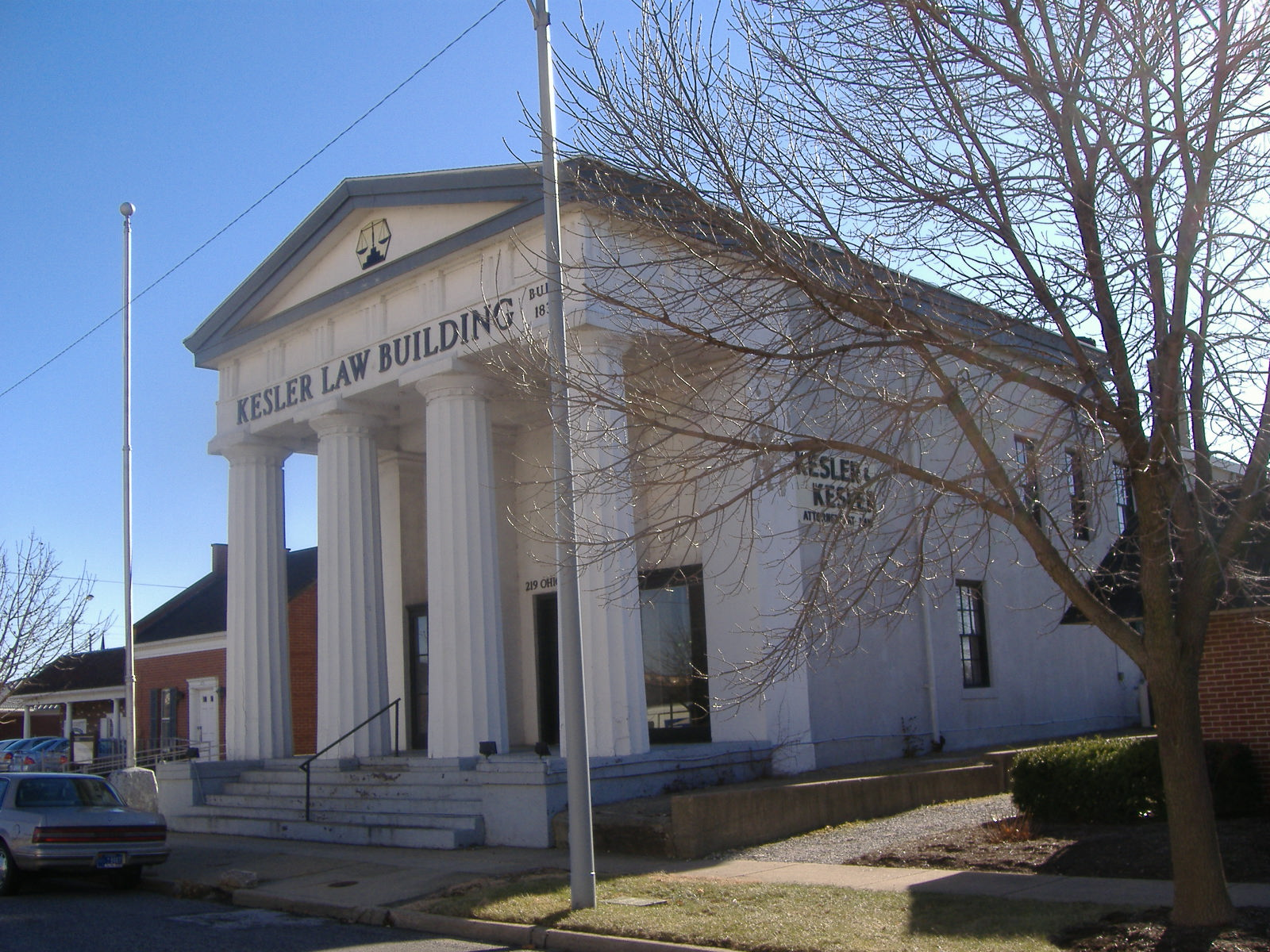
Terre Haute branch of the bank, now a law office

The bank was one of the most stable in the country and its banknotes were accepted throughout the Mississippi Valley and the Midwest. It only suspended exchange of paper money for hard money once, in 1837, when all the other banks in the nation did the same. The bank's coinage was almost exclusively silver, but it did contain a small amount of gold. It increased its gold holding significantly after the 1848 California Gold Rush led to more availability of gold, but silver remained the primary coin in circulation.

At the time of the 1837 suspension, the bank had over $1.5 million in federal deposits. Because of the nationwide suspension, the federal government was desperately short of hard money. Lanier personally delivered $80,000 in hard money to Levi Woodbury, the Secretary of the Treasury, knowing their situation. Because the bank was the only one in the nation that voluntarily gave hard money to the treasury, the treasury increased their deposit amount in the bank, further adding to its stability.

The bank was able to maintain its large reserves of hard money because many of the farmers in the state made their initial deposits in coin. There having been no prior bank in the region to issue paper money, hard money was the most widely used currency. The bank came under criticism in the 1840s. The "Free Bankers" considered the state bank a monopoly, which it was, and thought it was not liberal enough in offering loans. They claimed the bank was more likely to loan money to a farmer with assets than to private enterprises. The Free Bankers were dominant at the 1851 Constitutional Convention and instituted clauses that would end the state bank and authorize other banks to begin operating in Indiana, ending the bank's monopoly. Many of the competing banks lost solvency in the Panic of 1857, but the Bank of Indiana remained strong and did not require the suspension of specie payment.

The bank lobbied to have its charter extended, but the Democrats and Free Bankers who controlled the General Assembly refused. The bank charter expired in January 1857, but the bank was permitted to continue operating until 1859 to help exchange the bank's currency for notes from the new national bank. Governor Joseph A. Wright was bitterly opposed to the bank and the extension of its charter. Before the bill was passed he went to the House of Representatives to personally deliver a speech indicting the bank for "corruption and fraud", and alluded that the bank bribed members of the assembly to have its charter extended. Despite his speech and veto of the bill, the General Assembly passed the act with a super-majority.

== Aftermath ==
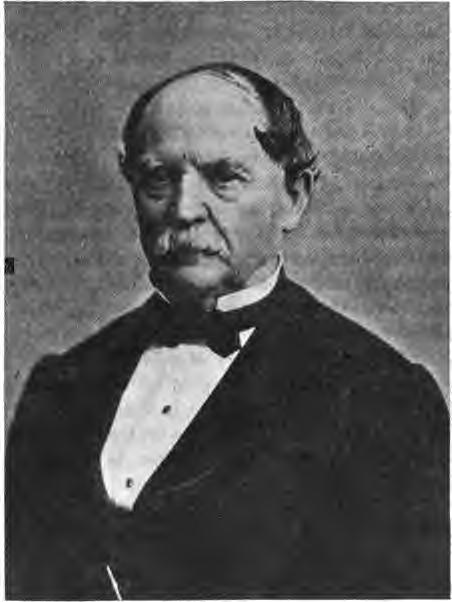
Director James Lanier

The closure of the bank did not have any significant impact on the regional economy. The state bank notes were exchanged for federal bank notes or hard money, and the surplus of funds was paid out to the bank shareholders. In 1851 General John Coburn, a delegate at the constitutional convention, proposed that any profit the state made from the bank be applied to the state's common school system. At the time most delegate believed the bank would end with a debt and thought the suggestion was fanciful, but the clause was added to constitution. The state's share of the profit, which was more than $3.5 million, was put into an education fund which helped the state continue to maintain the first state funded school system in the nation.

Many of the bank's notes were still not redeemed when the bank closed. To remedy this problem, and to maintain their reputation, the bank made arrangements with the national bank to deposit an amount equal to the outstanding notes that could be redeemed at the national bank out of that account, even if the Bank of Indiana ceased to operate. The bank is one of the few in history up to that time that was still solvent when it closed and actually paid out a profit to its investors.

The state passed legislation late in 1859 to permit the bank to incorporate privately. By then its stock had mostly been paid out, but it still retained its branch buildings and infrastructure which was reincorporated as the Second Bank of Indiana, a private institution with McCulloch continuing as president. James Lanier became so wealthy from his investments that when the state verged on bankruptcy during the American Civil War that he was able to privately bankroll the state and pay maintenance on their debt. He would use his wealth to become the largest shareholder in the Second Bank of Indiana, which during the Civil War financed the cost of calling up and equipping the state's regiments. The second bank continued until 1865 when, in an attempt to reestablish the primacy of the national bank, a 10% tax was created on bank notes that crippled the bank's profitability, forcing it to close.

== See also ==
- History of Indiana

== See also ==
- James Lanier
- Hugh McCulloch
- Samuel Merrill
