= Alliance, Indiana =

- Unincorporated community
- Location within Indiana Location within the United States
- Coordinates: 40°02′00″N 85°39′00″W
- Country: United States
- State: Indiana
- County: Madison
- Township: Adams
- Elevation: 919 ft (280 m)
- FIPS code: 18-01090
- GNIS feature ID: 430101

Alliance is an unincorporated community in Adams Township, Madison County, Indiana.

It is centered along CR 500S between IN SR 109 and CR 100E, around the railroad crossing.

Alliance was a station and shipping point on the Big Four Railroad.
