= Adams Township, Madison County, Indiana =

Township in Indiana, United States

Adams Township
- Township
- Flag

- Location in Madison County
- Coordinates: 39°59′40″N 85°37′10″W
- Country: United States
- State: Indiana
- County: Madison

Government
  - Type: Indiana township

Area
  - Total: 36.07 sq mi (93.4 km^{2})
  - Land: 36.05 sq mi (93.4 km^{2})
  - Water: 0.02 sq mi (0.052 km^{2}) 0.06%
- Elevation: 938 ft (286 m)

Population (2020)
  - Total: 3,957
  - Density: 108/sq mi (42/km^{2})
- ZIP codes: 46013, 46017, 46056, 46064, 47356
- GNIS feature ID: 0453078

Adams Township is one of fourteen townships in Madison County, Indiana, United States. As of the 2010 census, its population was 3,892 and it contained 1,614 housing units.

It was named for Abraham Adams, a pioneer settler.

== Geography ==
According to the 2010 census, the township has a total area of 36.07 square miles (93.4 km^{2}), of which 36.05 square miles (93.4 km^{2}) (or 99.94%) is land and 0.02 square miles (0.052 km^{2}) (or 0.06%) is water.

=== Cities, towns, villages ===
- Anderson (southeast edge)
- Markleville

=== Unincorporated towns ===
- Alliance at 40.033376°N 85.649976°W
- Emporia at 40.004488°N 85.633865°W
- New Columbus at 40.018932°N 85.65581°W

=== Cemeteries ===
The township contains these five cemeteries: Capp, Collier, Gilmore, Peewee and Walker.

=== Major highways ===
- U.S. Route 36
- Indiana State Road 38

State Road 109

None

== Education ==
- South Madison Community School Corporation

Adams Township residents may obtain a free library card from the Pendleton Community Public Library in Pendleton.

== Political districts ==
- Indiana's 5th congressional district
- State House District 37
- State Senate District 25
