= Emporia, Indiana =

- Unincorporated community
- Location within Indiana Location within the United States
- Coordinates: 40°00′16″N 85°38′02″W
- Country: United States
- State: Indiana
- County: Madison
- Township: Adams
- Elevation: 925 ft (282 m)
- ZIP code: 46056
- FIPS code: 18-21160
- GNIS feature ID: 434191

Emporia is an unincorporated community in Adams Township, Madison County, Indiana.

== Geography ==
Emporia is located at the intersection of State Road 109 and U.S. Route 36. Large grain elevators operated by Kokomo Grain Co. are the community's most prominent landmark.

== History ==
Emporia was founded in 1891 when the railroad was extended to that point. A post office was established at Emporia in 1892, and remained in operation until it was discontinued in 1907.
