= Pendleton Historic District (Pendleton, Indiana) =

Historic district in Indiana, United States

- U.S. National Register of Historic Places
- U.S. Historic district
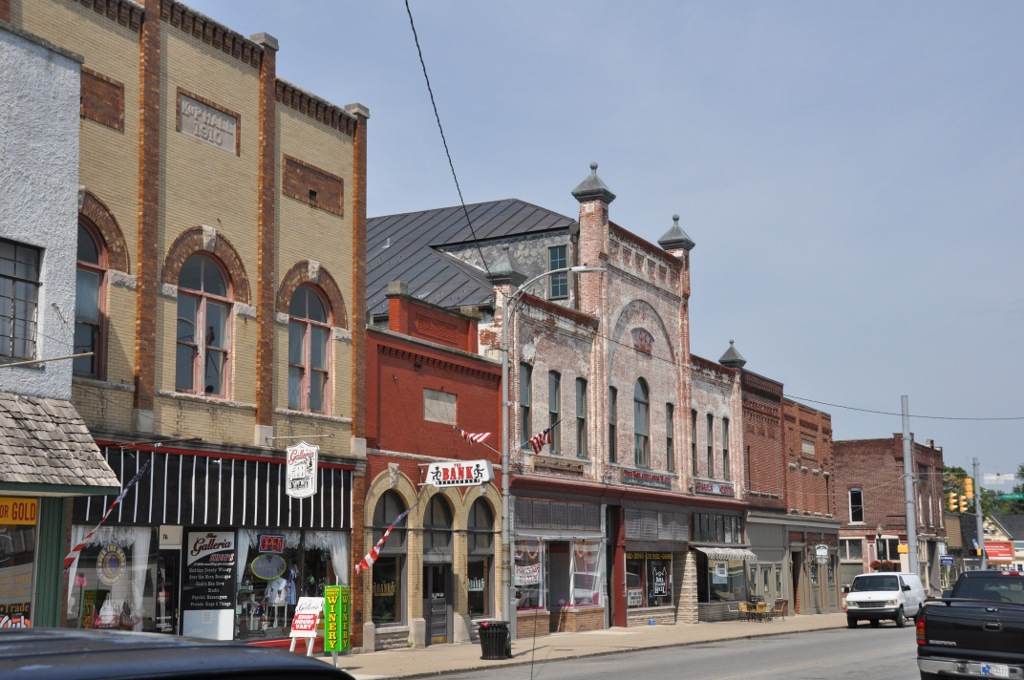

- Location within Indiana Location within the United States
- Location: Roughly bounded by Fall Cr., the Conrail right-of-way, Madison and Adams Sts., Pendleton, Indiana
- Coordinates: 40°0′10″N 85°44′48″W
- Area: 198 acres (80 ha)
- Architect: Wakins, Ernest R.
- Architectural style: Bungalow/Craftsman, Greek Revival, Federal
- NRHP reference No.: 91000788
- Added to NRHP: May 15, 1991

The Pendleton Historic District is a national historic district located at Pendleton, Indiana. Sites of interest include a relatively intact 19th-century business district, Fall Creek Park, the Grey Goose Inn (built in 1820), and a large variety of homes in Federal, Greek Revival, and American Craftsman styles. The structures within the district are described in detail in the 1984 Madison County Interim Report, which was part of the Indiana Historical Sites and Structures Inventory (IHSSI). The historic district includes the original 1821 plat by Thomas M. Pendleton and several of the subsequent plat additions.

The historic district includes the historic portion of Falls Park. Pendleton, the first settlement in Madison County, was originally formed by homesteaders attracted to the scenic beauty—and hydrologic potential (for water mills)--of the falls.

In 1825, an important milestone was marked in Native American rights when the European-American perpetrators of the Fall Creek Massacre were hanged near the falls.

In 1843, Frederick Douglass spoke in Pendleton as one of the American Anti-Slavery Society's Hundred Conventions. The gathered crowd was dispersed by an armed mob that chased Douglass, overtaking and beating him near the falls. He was saved by local Quakers, with whom he remained friends with throughout his life. A historic marker in Pendleton commemorates Douglass's speech here.

Falls Park is also historically significant as a noted recreational destination between 1921 and the 1950s. During this time, the area below the falls was made into a natural pool. In 1923 it was announced as one of the best, if not the best, swimming location in the state.

The district was listed on the National Register of Historic Places in 1991.
