= New Columbus, Indiana =

- Unincorporated community
- Location within Indiana Location within the United States
- Coordinates: 40°01′08″N 85°39′21″W
- Country: United States
- State: Indiana
- County: Madison
- Township: Adams
- Settled: 1823
- Platted: 1834
- Founder: Abraham Adams
- Elevation: 906 ft (276 m)
- Time zone: Eastern
- ZIP code: 46013
- Area codes: 317, 463, 765
- FIPS code: 18-52794
- GNIS feature ID: 440036

New Columbus is an unincorporated community in Adams Township, Madison County, Indiana, United States. It is also known as Ovid, and is marked by both names on highway signs at the town's borders.

== History ==
Abraham Adams arrived in the nascent Madison County the same year that it was being organized. He built his log cabin on the south side of Fall Creek, and in 1834 he platted a town on the site, calling it New Columbus. This name was used until 1837, when a US Post Office was brought to the community. Post Office officials feared the town's name would be confused with Columbus, the seat of Bartholomew County. They arbitrarily chose to name the Post Office Ovid. Local residents resisted, and in 1840 launched legal action to change the PO name, but were unsuccessful.

The Ovid Post Office was discontinued after a century of operation, and at that time residents again petitioned various state agencies to have the original name restored to the community. However, by that time "Ovid" was in common use, so both names are still used: The state's official highway mad calls it Ovid; the official county map issued by Madison County calls it New Columbus. Road signs on New Columbus Road through the community read "New Columbus or Ovid".

=== Water-powered mill ===
Many Indiana settlements used water power to grind wheat and run sawmills. The first such installation in New Columbus was on Fall Creek, east of the settlement. Remnants of the several-hundred-foot mill race are still visible.

In the 1910s, Fall Creek was dredged and straightened, allowing the nearby flatland to be tilled and harvested.

Mt. Zion Lutheran Church was built at the west end of town in 1860–61. The building still stands but is no longer used as a church, but is being maintained as a historical site.

The Ovid School (Adams Township District #4 School) was placed in service in 1873.

North of the settlement, the German Baptist church building was erected in 1860.
