= James Noble (Indiana politician) =

American politician from Indiana (1785–1831)

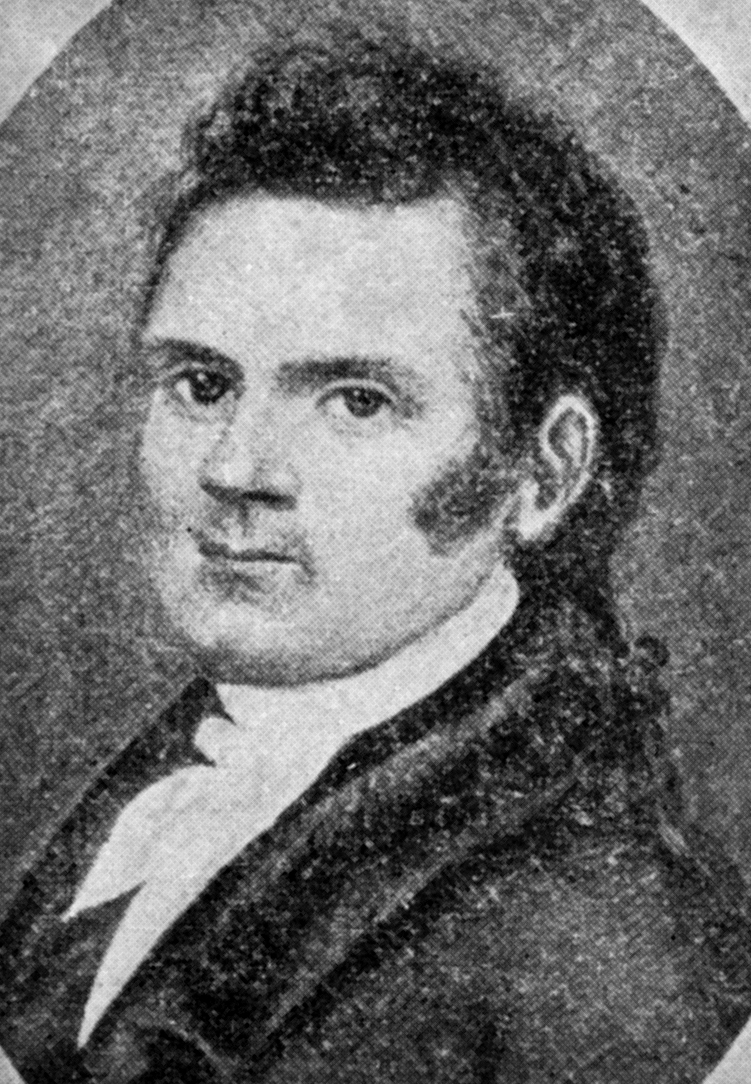
- James Noble from Who-When-What Book, 1900

United States Senator from Indiana
- In office December 11, 1816 – February 26, 1831
- Preceded by: Seat established
- Succeeded by: Robert Hanna

Member of the Indiana House of Representatives
- In office 1816

Personal details
- Born: December 16, 1785 Clarke County, Virginia
- Died: February 26, 1831 (aged 45) Washington, D.C.
- Party: Democratic-Republican (until 1824); National Republican Party (1824-1831)

James Noble (December 16, 1785 – February 26, 1831) was the first U.S. senator from the U.S. state of Indiana.

Noble was born in Clarke County, Virginia near Berryville, and moved with his parents to Campbell County, Kentucky, when he was 10. There he studied law and he became an attorney, after which he moved to Indiana and settled in Brookville around 1808.

Once settled in Indiana he became a ferryboat operator, a judge and a member of the state's first constitutional convention, in 1816, as a delegate from Franklin County.

He was elected to the first session of the Indiana State House of Representatives in 1816.

He was elected as a Crawford faction Democratic Republican (later an anti-Jacksonian Democrat) to the United States Senate in 1816. He was reelected to two more terms and served from December 11, 1816, until his death in 1831.

While in the Senate he was chairman of the U.S. Senate Committee on Pensions for the 15th, 16th, 17th, 18th and 20th Congresses, and chairman of the U.S. Committee on the Militia for the 16th and 17th Congresses.

He died in Washington, D.C., and is buried in the Congressional Cemetery.

== See also ==
- List of members of the United States Congress who died in office (1790–1899)

U.S. Senate
Preceded by None	U.S. senator (Class 1) from Indiana; 1816–1831; Served alongside: Waller Taylor, William Hendricks	Succeeded by Robert Hanna
