= Second Presbyterian Church (Indianapolis, Indiana) =

- Second Presbyterian Church of Indianapolis
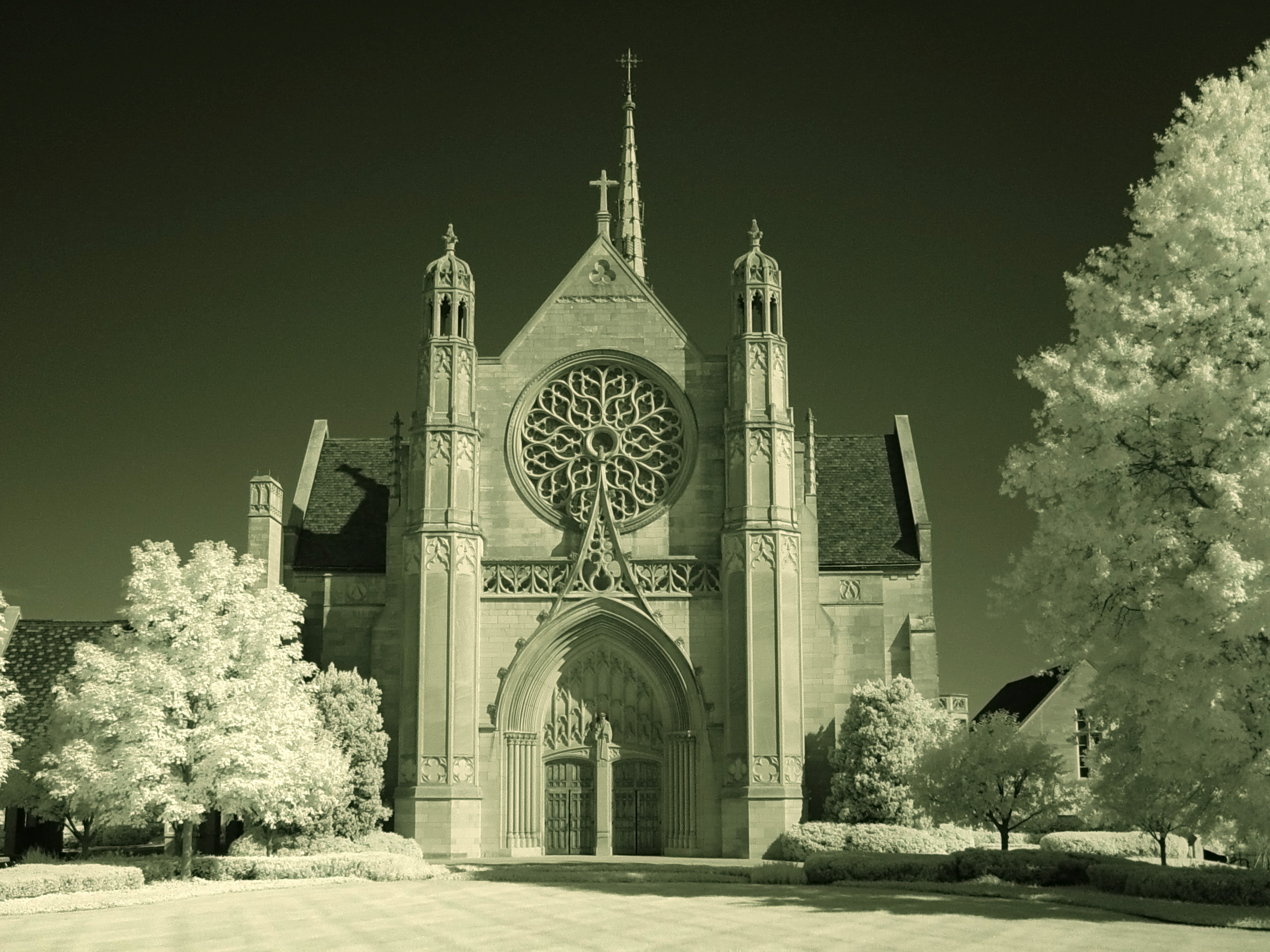
- Second Presbyterian Church
- 39°53′42.1″N 86°09′32.2″W
- Location: 7700 N Meridian Street, Indianapolis, Indiana
- Country: United States
- Denomination: Presbyterian Church (USA)
- Previous denomination: New School Presbyterian (1837–1870)
- Churchmanship: Mainline Protestant
- Website: secondchurch.org

History
- Founded: 1837
- Founder: Henry Ward Beecher

Architecture
- Style: Neo-Gothic
- Years built: 1957–1959

Second Presbyterian Church is a historic congregation located at 7700 North Meridian Street in Indianapolis, Indiana. With 4,049 members as of 2013, and 3,415 as of 2024, it is one of the largest congregations in the Presbyterian Church (U.S.A.).

== History ==
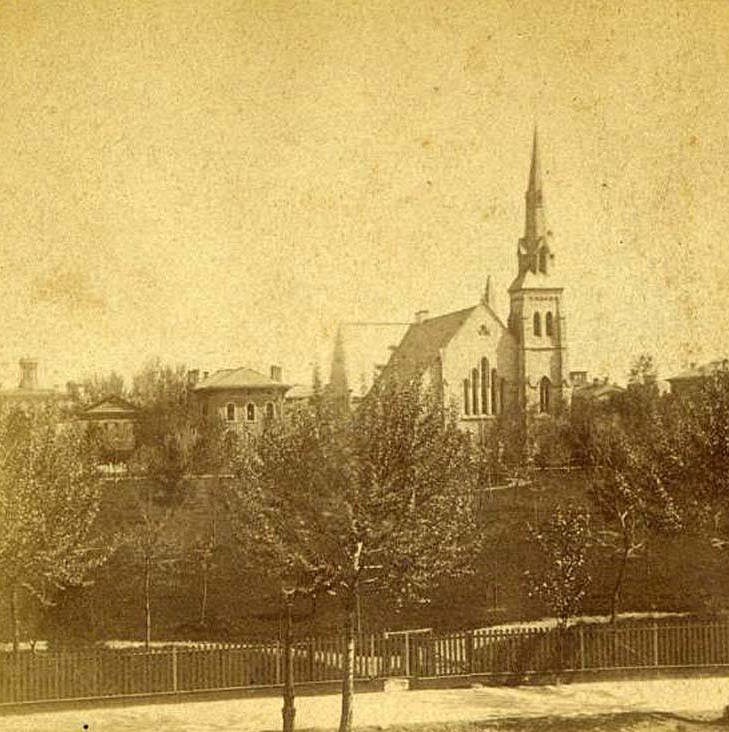
The church at its former location as seen from New York Street, ca. 1873

The congregation was founded in 1837 when fifteen members of the Presbyterian Church of Indianapolis, which would subsequently be known as First Presbyterian, broke off as part of the Old School–New School Controversy. The new congregation adhered to the New School General Assembly and soon took the name Second Presbyterian. On May 13, 1839, Henry Ward Beecher was installed as the first minister, the brother of Harriet Beecher Stowe. Beecher would go on to become one of the most famous men in nineteenth century America. He became known for his use of humor and informal language in his preaching and built the congregation to the largest in the city during his tenure as pastor.

The congregation built its first house of worship on Governor's Circle (modern day Monument Circle), the focal point of the Indianapolis street grid. As the population grew, in the 1860s it was decided to move three blocks north, to a property on the northwest corner of Vermont and Pennsylvania Streets. The new Gothic building was completed in 1870 at a cost of $105,000, although the chapel had already been in use since 1867. In the 1920s, the city block on which the church stood was mostly cleared to make way for the Indiana War Memorial. The church, along with a number of other buildings, held out from demolition. The church was not razed until 1960, after the completion of the congregation's current home on North Meridian Street.

On April 11, 1990, Second Presbyterian Church held funeral services for Ryan White. Over 1,500 people attended the standing-room only event, including Michael Jackson, First Lady of the United States Barbara Bush, and Elton John, who performed "Skyline Pigeon".
