= James B. Ray =

American politician (1794–1848)

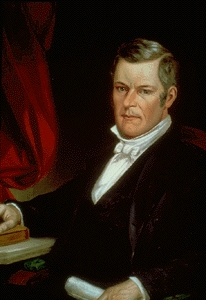

4th Governor of Indiana
- In office February 12, 1825 – December 7, 1831
- Lieutenant: John H. Thompson; Milton Stapp
- Preceded by: William Hendricks
- Succeeded by: Noah Noble

Indiana State Senator Senate president pro tempore
- In office December 2, 1822 – February 12, 1825

Indiana House of Representatives
- In office December 2, 1821 – December 2, 1822

Personal details
- Born: James Brown Ray; February 19, 1794 Jefferson County, Kentucky, U.S.
- Died: August 4, 1848 (aged 54) Cincinnati, Ohio, U.S.
- Party: Independent
- Spouses: Mary Riddle (m. 1818; died 1823) Esther Booker (m. 1825)
- Children: 7
- Occupation: Lawyer

James Brown Ray (February 19, 1794 – August 4, 1848) was an Indiana politician and the only Indiana Senate president pro tempore to be elevated to governor of the state of Indiana. Ray served during a time when the state transitioned from personal politics to political parties, but never joined a party himself. Taking office one week before his 31st birthday, he became the state's youngest governor and served from 1825 to 1831, the longest period for an Indiana governor under the state constitution of 1816. During Ray's term as governor the state experienced a period of economic prosperity and a 45 percent population increase. He supported projects that encouraged the continued growth and development of the young state, most notably internal improvements, Native American removal, codification of Indiana's laws, improved county and local government, and expanded educational opportunities. Ray was known for his eccentricity and early promotion of a large-scale railroad system in the state. His support for new railroad construction and alleged involvement in several scandals caused him to lose popularity among voters. Ray's opponents who favored the creation of canals considered railroads to be an impractical, utopian idea. Following Ray's departure from political office, he continued to advocate for a statewide railroad system until his death in 1848.

== Early life ==
=== Family and background ===
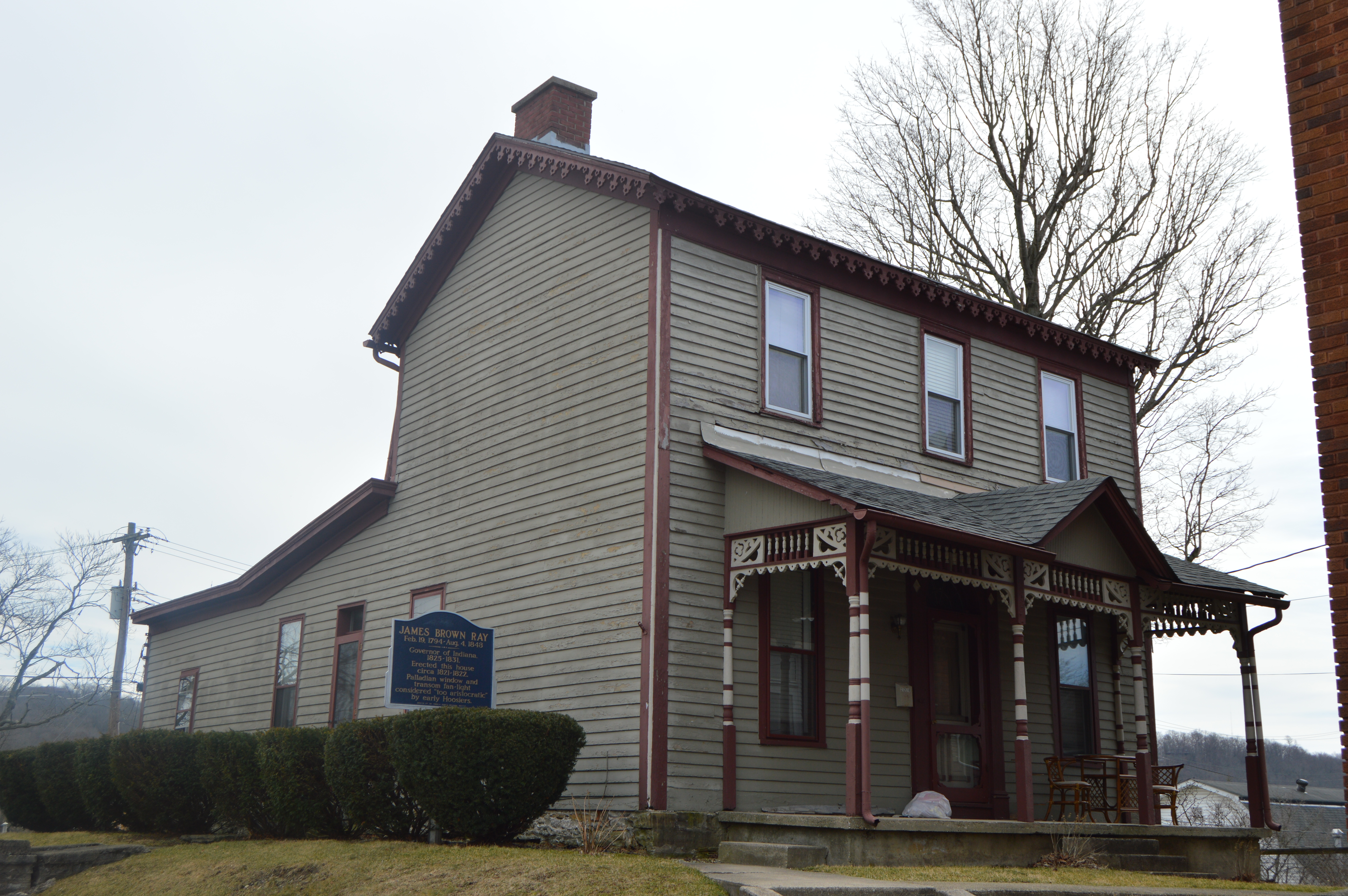
Ray's house in Brookville

James Brown Ray was born in Jefferson County, Kentucky, on February 19, 1794, the son of Rev. William Ray, a veteran of the American Revolutionary War, and Phebe Ann Brown Ray. He was one of twelve children. Ray attended local common schools and received a basic education. Ray moved to Cincinnati, Ohio, when he was still a boy, where he studied law in the office of General Gano, and was admitted to the bar in 1816. Ray briefly served as deputy clerk of Hamilton County, Ohio.

Ray married Mary Riddle of Hamilton County, Ohio, on December 10, 1818. That same year the couple moved to Brookville, Indiana, where they had two children prior to Mary's death on July 4, 1823. Ray established a law office in Brookville and quickly rose to prominence in the community. Ray was known to be rash and sometimes belligerent. In one incident Ray insulted a Brookville farmer who severely beat him for the insult. In another incident Ray threatened another lawyer with a "thrashing" before a court session, to which the lawyer replied with a fist in Ray's face. The courtroom went wild. Both men had to be restrained before further blows could be thrown.

Ray married Esther Booker (née Gay), widow of Samuel P. Booker, of Centerville, Indiana, in September 1825. The couple had five children.

=== Legislator ===
Ray's outspoken manner helped him gain popularity in his community. In 1821 he served a one-year term in the Indiana House of Representatives. The next year he was elected to the Indiana State Senate and began his term on December 2, 1822. On January 30, 1824, the same day Lieutenant Governor Ratliff Boon resigned to take a seat in the U.S. House of Representatives, Ray was elected the Indiana Senate's president pro tempore.

== Governor ==
Ray became the state's fourth governor on February 12, 1825, when Indiana governor William Hendricks resigned from his office to become a U.S. senator. The lieutenant governor's office had remained vacant after Boon's departure for the U.S. House of Representatives the previous year. This is the only time this occurred in Indiana history. After a brief debate about his eligibility to become governor because of his young age, Ray was able to provide proof that he met the minimum age of thirty as required under the state constitution.

Indiana was still a young state during Ray's tenure as governor, but it was growing rapidly. The state's population increased 45 percent and its finances were strengthened during a period of relative prosperity. To encourage further settlement and economic development, Ray supported internal improvements, Native American removal, codification of Indiana's laws, improved county and local government, and expanded educational opportunities. Party politics also entered the state during Ray's term as governor. Previously, politicians in the state were loosely affiliated with the Democratic-Republican Party or none at all. During the 1820s national parties were generally divided among Jeffersonian Republicans, who followed Henry Clay and John Quincy Adams, and Jacksonian Democrats, who supported Andrew Jackson. Ray resisted the rise of the parties and tried to remain neutral.

In the summer of 1825, Ray announced that he would seek election for a full three-year term as governor. Ray campaigned against Isaac Blackford, Chief Justice of the Indiana Supreme Court. Blackford, a graduate of Princeton University, charged that Ray was "pompous, poorly educated, and ill-equipped for the job." Ray countered with arguments against party politics and made a strong case for internal improvements. Ray won the election with 13,040 votes to 10,418, a margin of 2,622 votes.

Ray became the first governor to serve in the new capitol of Indianapolis. His wife found the Governor's Mansion in Monument Circle to lack privacy, and the couple refused to live there.

=== Internal improvements ===
On December 8, 1825, Ray delivered his first address to the Indiana General Assembly and called for internal improvements in the state's transportation system. Ray cited Ohio's recent success with its canal projects as evidence of their economic value. However, Ray changed his position in 1827 and decided that the state would receive greater benefit from railroad construction projects. At that time railroads were still relatively new and their value was not yet evident. Ray became an opponent of canal projects and advocated for railroads throughout the remainder of his life. As governor, Ray requested state legislature to create a committee to explore the possibilities of building new railroads. The committed supported the construction of canals. Their report called Ray's plans to make Indianapolis a railroad hub "utopian" and "mad and impractical". A compromise was ultimately reached to fund both projects. After the previous administration's efforts under William Hendricks restored the state's credit and stabilize its income, Ray's administration was able to move ahead with plans to build canals, railroads, and more roads in the state. Design plans for the Wabash and Erie Canal began during Ray's administration, but his opponents accused him of purposely delaying progress on the project by delaying reports, slowing progress in surveying, and in other areas, which further kindled distrust from the legislature. The state's first railroad was also constructed, a short line connecting Shelbyville, Indiana to Indianapolis as a compromise with the governor to approve funds for the canal. Industry in the state expanded exponentially during those years with several large factories opening up in the different locations around the state.

=== Michigan Road ===
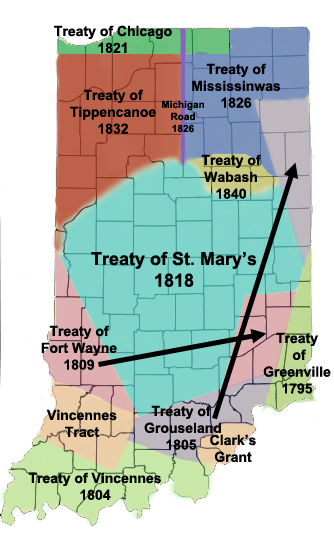
Map of Land Cession treaties in Indiana

Another of Ray's key transportation projects was the construction of the Michigan Road across Indiana. The plans for the road would extend from the Ohio River in the south to Lake Michigan in the north, and pass through Indianapolis in the central part of the state. The new road would require the Potawatomi and the Miami people to cede their lands in northern and central Indiana to the federal government to make way for its construction. Ray wrote President John Quincy Adams requesting a treaty to acquire land for the project. Adams responded by appointing Ray, Michigan governor Lewis Cass, and John Tipton as commissioners to negotiate a treaty, which was concluded in the fall of 1826. More than 1,000,000 acres (4,000 km^{2}) of land was transferred to the United States government.

Ray's opponents in the state legislature seized the opportunity to attack him for taking a commission from the federal government as a treaty negotiator, claiming that it violated Indiana's constitution. His critics argued that in taking the position, Ray forfeited his position as governor. A motion to bring impeachment proceedings against Ray was narrowly defeated in the Indiana General Assembly by a vote of 31 to 27. Ray's situation was similar to the attempted impeachment of Indiana governor Jonathan Jennings in 1818.

=== Codification of state laws ===
Other events began to transpire, which caused Ray's popularity to wane considerably. Ray initiated efforts to simplify Indiana's civil and criminal laws. He suggested that the state's legal code should be modeled on Louisiana laws, which used the Napoleonic Code as a template. Ray initially assumed responsibility for the project at his own expense, but two years after the Indiana General Assembly passed a bill to expand and improve the Indiana Code, the work was still not completed. Ray asked the legislature to grant additional funds and provide an assistant to complete the project. The assembly granted his request and appointed a committee to create the Revised Code of 1831.

=== Fall Creek Massacre ===
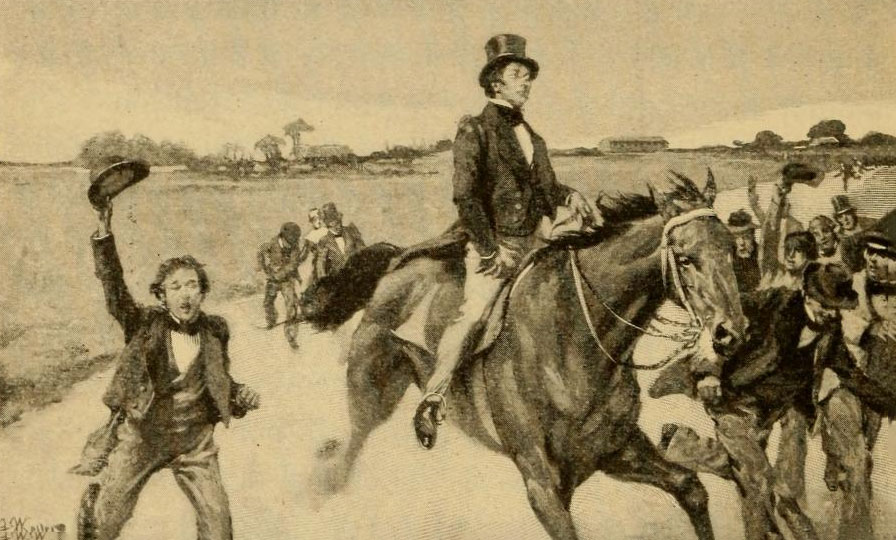
Gov. Ray arrives to pardon the minor convicted of murder in the Fall Creek Massacre as depicted in the book Stories of Indiana, by Maurice Thompson.

Another notable event during Ray's first term in office took place when three white men were scheduled to be hanged for the murder of nine Native American men, women, and children. It marked the first documented trial, sentencing, and execution of whites for the murder of Native Americans under United States law. The Fall Creek Massacre and the executions of the convicted murderers took place on Fall Creek, near Pendleton in Madison County, Indiana, ten miles northeast of Indianapolis. On June 3, 1825, a large crowd, including members of the Seneca Nation, gathered to witness the executions. Two of the convicted men were hanged; however, Ray arrived to issue a dramatic, last-minute pardon to seventeen-year-old John Bridge Jr. after local residents petitioned the governor to intervene. Bridge was immediately taken down from the gallows, untied, and set free.

=== Education ===
Ray supported free public education in Indiana and as governor proposed the sale of public lands to establish schools and hire qualified educators. He recommended that the Indiana State Seminary, which opened in 1825 at Bloomington, Indiana, be elevated to a college. In January 1828 the state legislature approved an act to rename it Indiana College, which later became Indiana University.

=== Controversy and political disputes ===
In 1827 Ray became involved in a bitter dispute with Samuel Merrill, the Indiana State Treasurer. Merrill, an ally of Blackford, made personal attacks on Ray, claiming he was committing fraud and using his public office for personal gain. Merrill specifically tried to incriminate him for making a secret deal with the Indians when negotiating the treaty in 1826, claiming that he had accepted a bribe from them. Merrill's charges were ambiguous, lacking considerable detail, but was enough to stir a controversy and give an excuse to Ray's opponents to further again attack. Ray's supporters included Lewis Cass, governor of the Michigan Territory, who wrote a letter to the Indiana General Assembly on his behalf. The dispute ended, but Ray's image was tarnished.

=== Second term ===
Political conflicts and controversies continued during Ray's second term. When Ray ran for reelection in 1828, he was approached by pro-Jackson men to join the Jacksonian party, which was just beginning to form in the state. Ray agreed to the proposal as long as his acceptance remained a secret. A short time later Ray was interviewed by a pro-Clay newspaper and he called the Jacksonian-Democrats an "outrageous, violent faction." The Jackson men responded by fielding their own candidate and publishing Ray's secret agreement. Despite the controversy over his attempt to gain the favor of both parties, Ray won reelection on August 4, 1828. He received 15,131 votes; Whig candidate Israel T. Branby received 12,251; and Democratic candidate Harbin H. Moore received 10,898.

Another conflict arose in 1830 when the Indiana Supreme Court was up for reappointment. Ray reappointed Justice Issac Blackford, but delayed the reappointment of Jesse Lynch Holman and James Scott. Ray bargained behind the scenes with leaders in the state legislature for a deal: Ray would reappoint Holman and Scott to the courts and in exchange for Ray's election to the U. S. Senate. Ray eventually appointed the two men, but lost his bid for the Senate seat. The secret deal, combined with what was considered his "insane" idea of making Indianapolis a hub for a great railroad system and without a party to support him, he lost most of his public support.

Nearing the end of his term in office, Ray became defensive, accused his critics with conspiring against him, and claimed he was the "victim of misrepresentation and malicious envy." His detractors described him as hot-tempered and unable to handle criticism. Having accomplished little in his second term, Ray left office on December 7, 1831.

== Return to private life ==
Ray resumed a law practice in Indianapolis after his term as governor ended, but found the business did not meet his expectations. Ray ran for political office on several occasions but was unsuccessful. In 1831 he ran for Congress, but lost to John Carr. He attempted to run again in 1833, but dropped out after his inability to win became apparent. He tried once again in 1837, but was soundly defeated by William Herod, 5,888 votes to 9,635. Ray also lost bids to become Clerk of Marion County and a commissioner of the Wabash and Erie Canal in 1835. After business ventures in Greencastle failed, Ray moved to Centerville, Indiana, where he established a law firm with a brother and a dry goods business with a nephew. Ray returned to Indianapolis in 1846 to establish a law and advisory business, what he called at "Law, conveyancing, writing, abstract-making, land-agency, general and emigrants' intelligence and counsel office." The business soon folded for lack of customers.

Ray purchased a home in Indianapolis that was built in 1835 and originally stood on the site where the Marion County Jail now stands. The home was moved in 1977 and is located within the Lockerbie Square Historic District.Ray's home is believed to be one of the oldest remaining in the city.

His treatment led him to become even more firm in his views, which further hurt his standing. His behavior only worsened the situation; he was known to walk with a cane, for appearance only, and stop in the street and write in the air with it for no apparent reason. He ran advertisements in the newspaper offering to sell a "tavern-stand", a farm he did not own, and offering to construct a railroad from Charleston, South Carolina to Indianapolis. He had few friends and most people believed he had become mentally deranged.

Ray fell ill during a trip to Wisconsin in the summer of 1848 and returned to a relative's home in Cincinnati, Ohio, where he died of cholera on August 4, 1848, aged 54. He was buried in Cincinnati's Spring Grove Cemetery.

== Legacy ==
Governor Ray is the namesake of Ray Township, Franklin County, Indiana.

== See also ==
- List of governors of Indiana

Political offices
Preceded by William Hendricks	Governor of Indiana; 1825–1831	Succeeded by Noah Noble
