= 1892 Indiana gubernatorial election =

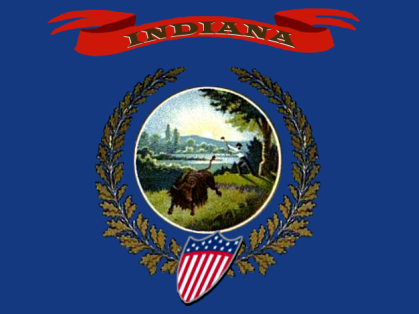
- November 8, 1892
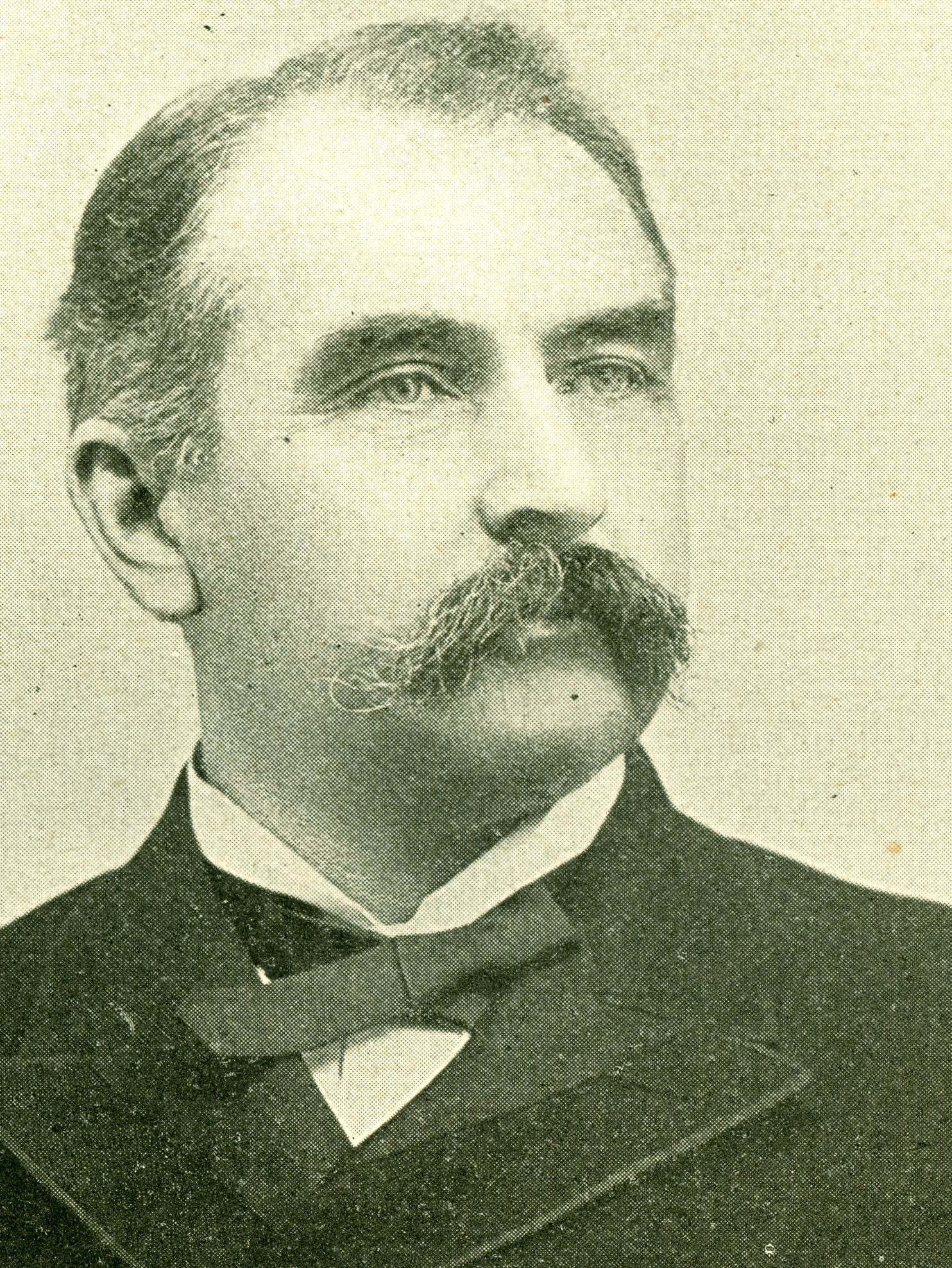

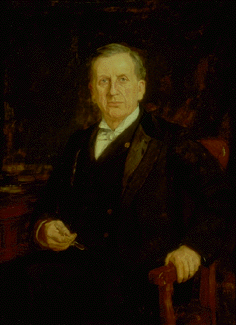
Nominee	Claude Matthews	Ira Joy Chase
Party	Democratic	Republican
Popular vote	260,601	253,625
Percentage	47.45%	46.18%
- County results Matthews: 40–50% 50–60% 60–70% Chase: 40–50% 50–60% 60–70%
Governor before election
Ira Joy Chase
Republican
Elected Governor
Claude Matthews
Democratic

The 1892 Indiana gubernatorial election was held on November 8, 1892, pitting the Republican nominee, incumbent governor Ira Joy Chase, who had succeeded to the office the previous year following the death of governor Alvin Peterson Hovey, against the Democratic nominee, Indiana Secretary of State Claude Matthews. The campaign focused primarily on depressed farm prices and farmers' desires to inflate the currency to alleviate debt problems. Matthews narrowly won the election, defeating Governor Chase by 6,976 votes.

== General election ==
=== Candidates ===
Major party candidates

- Claude Matthews, Democratic, incumbent Secretary of State
- Ira Joy Chase, Republican, incumbent Governor

Other candidates

- Leroy Templeton, People's
- Aaron Worth, Prohibition

=== Results ===
1892 Indiana gubernatorial election
Party	Candidate	Votes	%	±%
Democratic	Claude Matthews	260,601	47.45%	
Republican	Ira Joy Chase (incumbent)	253,625	46.18%	
Populist	Leroy Templeton	22,017	4.01%	
Prohibition	Aaron Worth	12,960	2.36%	
Majority		6,976		
Turnout				
Democratic gain from Republican		Swing		
