= Ira Joy Chase =

American politician

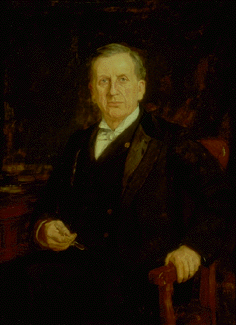

22nd Governor of Indiana
- In office November 23, 1891 – January 9, 1893
- Lieutenant: Francis M. Griffith (acting)
- Preceded by: Alvin Peterson Hovey
- Succeeded by: Claude Matthews

22nd Lieutenant Governor of Indiana
- In office January 14, 1889 – November 23, 1891
- Governor: Alvin Peterson Hovey
- Preceded by: Alonzo G. Smith as Acting Lieutenant Governor
- Succeeded by: Francis M. Griffith as Acting Lieutenant Governor

Personal details
- Born: December 7, 1834 Monroe County, New York, US
- Died: May 11, 1895 (aged 60) Lubec, Maine, US
- Resting place: Crown Hill Cemetery and Arboretum, Section 9, Lot 39; 39.8170379°N 86.1723064°W
- Party: Republican
- Spouse: Rhoda Jane Castle

Military service
- Allegiance: United States
- Branch/service: United States Army
- Years of service: 1860–1861
- Rank: chaplain
- Battles/wars: American Civil War

Ira Joy Chase (December 7, 1834 – May 11, 1895) was a veteran of the American Civil War, a leading member of the Grand Army of the Republic, a prominent Church of Christ evangelist, and the 22nd governor of Indiana between November 23, 1891, and January 9, 1893.

== Early life ==
Ira Joy Chase was born in 1834 in New York, the son of Benjamin and Lordina Mix Chase. His parents were poor, and spent much of his early life moving from place to place. He was educated at Medina Academy where he received a common education, and then attended the Milan Seminary to be trained as a minister. In 1855 his family moved to Barrington, Illinois. There he and his father took a job driving wagon teams in the Chicago stockyards. He soon found work as a teacher, where he met Rhoda Jane Castle. He married her and had three children before he joined the Union army at the start of the American Civil War. His health was frequently poor during the war, so he was removed from front-line duty and served as a drill instructor to prepare and train new recruits. His health still worsened and he was forced to spend several months in a military hospital. His wife heard of his situation and left their Illinois home to be with him in Tennessee. She was not permitted to remain in the hospital because she was a civilian, so she joined the army as a nurse. As his health recovered, he returned to duty as a chaplain.

The day after they left to return home in 1864, she contracted smallpox. Chase spent several weeks nursing her back to health, but the virus left her blind and crippled. Chase opened a hardware store to try to support his family, but the community avoided contact with him for weeks after his wife's smallpox had gone; the lack of customers forced him to close the store. He began preaching in local churches, and gained popularity in the community for his sermons against liquor. In 1867 he moved to Indiana to become the minister of the Christian Church of Mishawaka, Indiana. He also pastored in churches in La Porte, Wabash, and Danville.

Chase was one of the founding members of the Grand Army of the Republic. He became chaplain of the Indiana G.A.R. in 1886 and was elected as the department head in 1887, and served for several years in that position. The group was heavily involved in political lobbying, primarily to secure benefits for veterans of the Civil War. His high standing in the organization gained him clout in political circles because of his ability influence members' votes.

== Political career ==
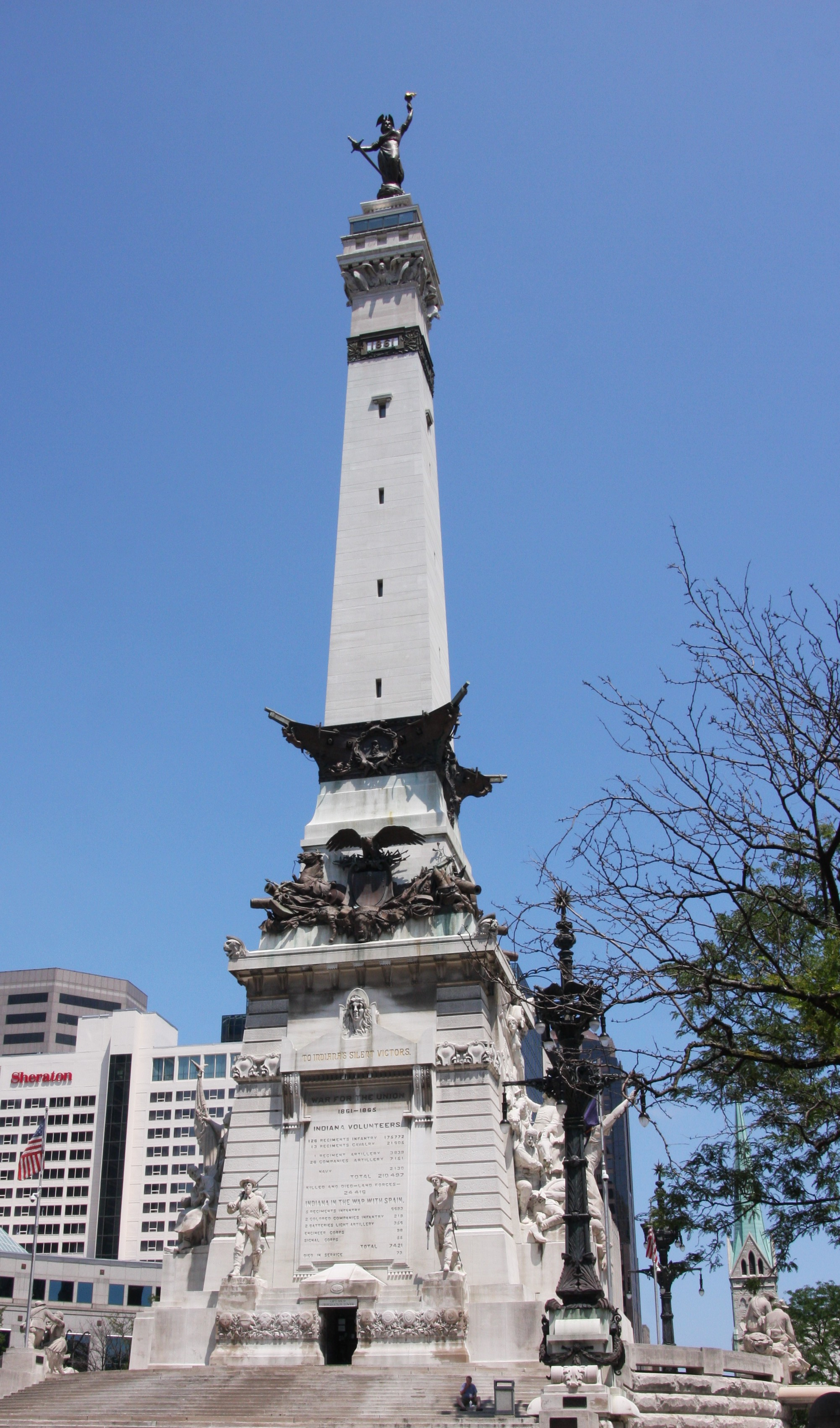
Soldiers' and Sailors' Monument in 2016

Because of his influence in the Indiana G.A.R., he was elected the 20th Lieutenant Governor of Indiana on January 14, 1889, and served until the death of Governor Alvin Peterson Hovey. He was criticized by the Methodists and other large denominations for continuing to serve as a minister during his tenure primarily because of their dislike for the Church of Christ.

== Governor of Indiana (1891-1893) ==
He was sworn in as governor on November 23, 1891, and served until January 9, 1893. His administration oversaw the expansion of the state's road system and the construction of the state's Soldiers' and Sailors' monument. He also returned the state to the temperance debate, urging prohibition laws to be enacted. His position on temperance was controversial within his own party. Republicans feared losing support to Democrats could cost the party on the national ticket. He had also oppose several work reform laws, and was perceived by many to be anti-labor.

He was nominated by his party to run for governor in 1892 for a full term of his own, and he accepted. Party leaders had attempted to deny him the chance because of his labor and temperance positions by holding the state convention as far as possible from his base of support and during harvest time in hopes that few farmers would attend, but the attempt failed. He delivered speeches at his many campaign stops where he would also preach a sermon later in the day at one of the area churches. His sermons were often firebrand and prohibitionist. Some of the doctrines he taught caused Methodist and Presbyterian churches, the two largest churches in the state, to urge their members to vote against him. He was defeated at the polls by Democrat Claude Matthews who won by plurality, with Populist Party candidate Leroy Templeton capturing nearly five percent of the vote which would have ordinarily gone to the Republican party.

== Later life and death ==
Chase returned to private life and continued preaching. He became even more prominent as a minister following his term as governor and began traveling nationally to deliver sermons. He died in 1895 in Lubec, Maine, after delivering a sermon. His remains were returned to be buried in the Crown Hill Cemetery in Indianapolis, Indiana (Section 9, Lot 39).

== Electoral history ==
Indiana gubernatorial election, 1892
Party	Candidate	Votes	%
Democratic	Claude Matthews	233,881	47.5
Republican	Ira Joy Chase (incumbent)	214,302	46.2
Populist	Leroy Templeton	22,401	3.5
Prohibition	Aaron Wirth	12,960	1.1

== See also ==
- List of governors of Indiana

Party political offices
Preceded by Alvin Peterson Hovey	Republican nominee for Governor of Indiana; 1892	Succeeded by James A. Mount
Political offices
Preceded by Robert S. Robertson	Lieutenant Governor of Indiana; 1889–1891	Succeeded by Mortimer Nye
Preceded by Alvin Peterson Hovey	Governor of Indiana; November 23, 1891 – January 9, 1893	Succeeded by Claude Matthews
