= William S. Haggard =

American politician

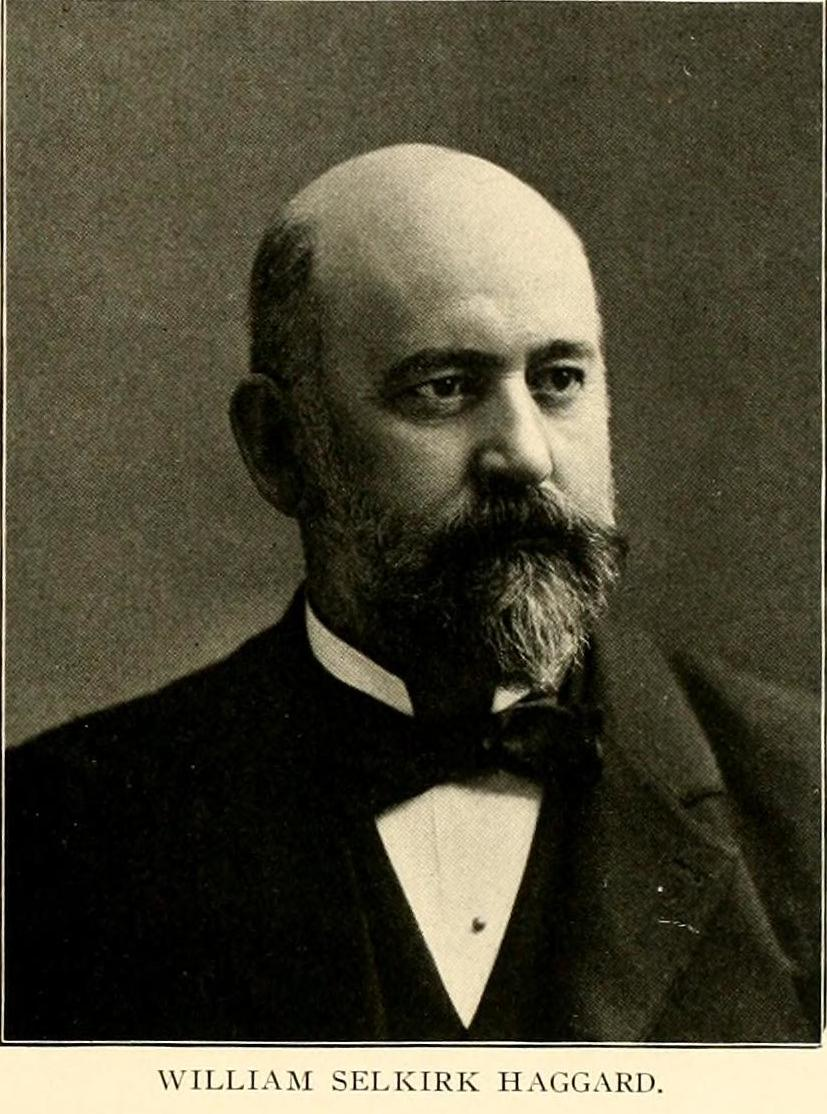

24th Lieutenant Governor of Indiana
- In office January 11, 1897 – January 14, 1901
- Governor: James A. Mount
- Preceded by: Mortimer Nye
- Succeeded by: Newton W. Gilbert

Personal details
- Born: September 17, 1847 Jeffersonville, Indiana, U.S.
- Died: July 6, 1911 (aged 63) Tippecanoe, Indiana, U.S.
- Party: Republican
- Education: Indiana University (BA) & (MA)

Military service
- Branch/service: Union Army
- Rank: Corporal
- Unit: 16th Battery, Indiana Light Artillery
- Battles/wars: American Civil War

William Selkirk Haggard (September 17, 1847 – July 6, 1911) was Lieutenant Governor of Indiana from 1897 to 1901.

== Life ==
William Haggard was born in Jeffersonville, Clark County in Indiana. His parents were John Haggard (a blacksmith from Ross County, Ohio) and Martha Jane Thacker (from Goochland County, Virginia). He attended school in Jeffersonville until he was 14, when the American Civil War began.

During the war, Haggard was a Corporal in the 16th Battery, Indiana Light Artillery.

After the war, he joined the Republican Party. In 1875, he was elected to the position of city judge for Lafayette, Indiana. In 1890 he was elected to the Indiana General Assembly, representing Clinton and Tippecanoe Counties; in 1892, he was re-elected to the Assembly, representing Tippecanoe County, and in 1894, he was elected to the Indiana State Senate, again representing Tippecanoe County.

In 1896 he was elected to the office of the Lieutenant Governor of Indiana. He served in this position between 11 January 1897 and 14 January 1901 when his term ended. In this function he was the deputy to Governor James A. Mount and he presided over the Indiana Senate.

For a couple of years Haggard was Commandant of the Indiana State Soldier's Home. He died on July 6, 1911 in the Soldiers Home in Tippecanoe, Indiana.

== Personal life ==
In 1873, Haggard married Josephine Lutz; they had two sons, Jesse and Fred.

Political offices
Preceded by Mortimer Nye	Lieutenant Governor of Indiana; 1897–1901	Succeeded by Newton W. Gilbert
