= Addison Roache =

American judge (1817–1906)

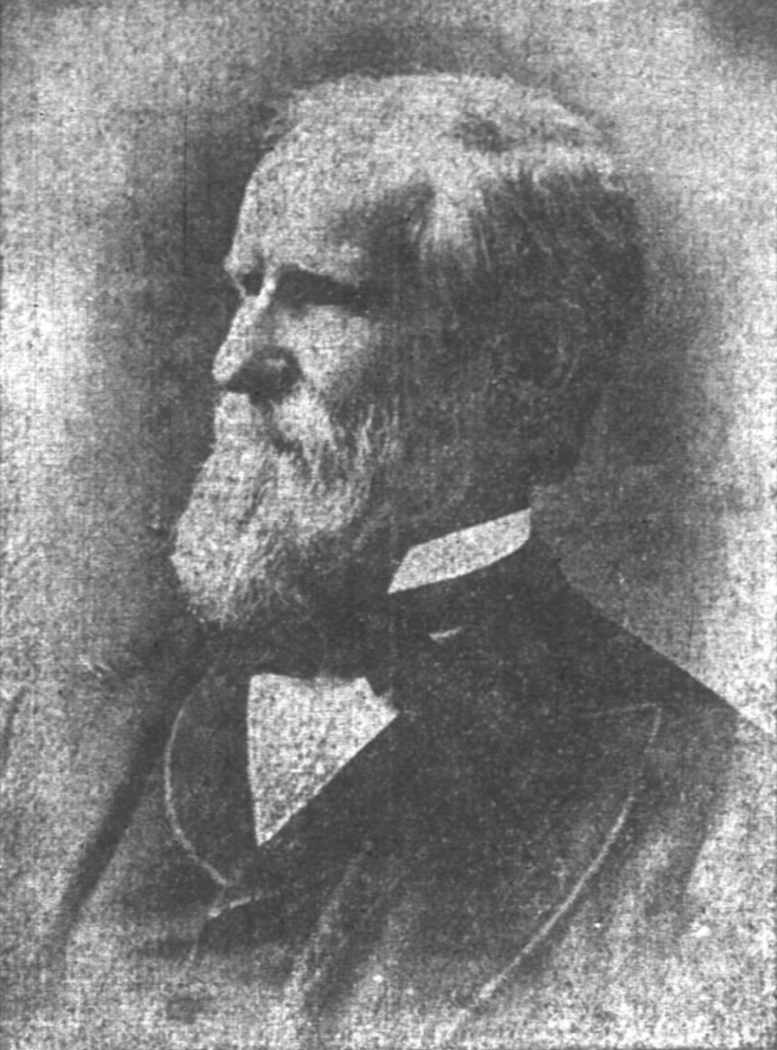
- Born: November 3, 1817; Rutherford County, Tennessee
- Died: April 24, 1906
- Burial place: Crown Hill Cemetery and Arboretum, Section 1, Lot 2; 39.88191138°N 86.1744002°W
- Occupation: Judge

Addison Locke Roache (November 3, 1817 – April 24, 1906) was a justice of the Indiana Supreme Court

from January 3, 1853, to May 8, 1854.

Born in Rutherford County, Tennessee, his family moved to Bloomington, Indiana, in September 1828. He graduated from Indiana University Bloomington in September 1836.

He studied law in the office of Tilghman Howard at Rockville and entered the practice of law in Frankfort in 1841. Roache returned to Rockville in 1847, and was elected to the Indiana House of Representatives as a Democrat in 1847, representing Parke County, Indiana. On October 12, 1852, he was elected to the Indiana Supreme Court, serving from January 3, 1853, to May 8, 1854. The pay for that office had recently been reduced to $1,200 per year, and Roache resigned after sixteen months on the bench.

In 1859 he moved to Indianapolis and formed a partnership with Joseph E. McDonald, of Montgomery County, who had just finished serving a term as Attorney General of Indiana. This partnership lasted for ten years, for some time under the name of McDonald, Roache & Sheets. Roache remained in practice well into his eighties, with an office in the Indiana Trust building, "where his advice was frequently sought by younger members of the bar". For several years, he was agent and manager of the New York Mercantile Trust Company.

Roache moved to California in the early 1900s and died there five years later. At the time of his death, he was the oldest surviving graduate of his class.

Political offices
Preceded by Newly created seat.	Justice of the Indiana Supreme Court; 1853–1854	Succeeded by Alvin P. Hovey
