= Claude Matthews =

American politician

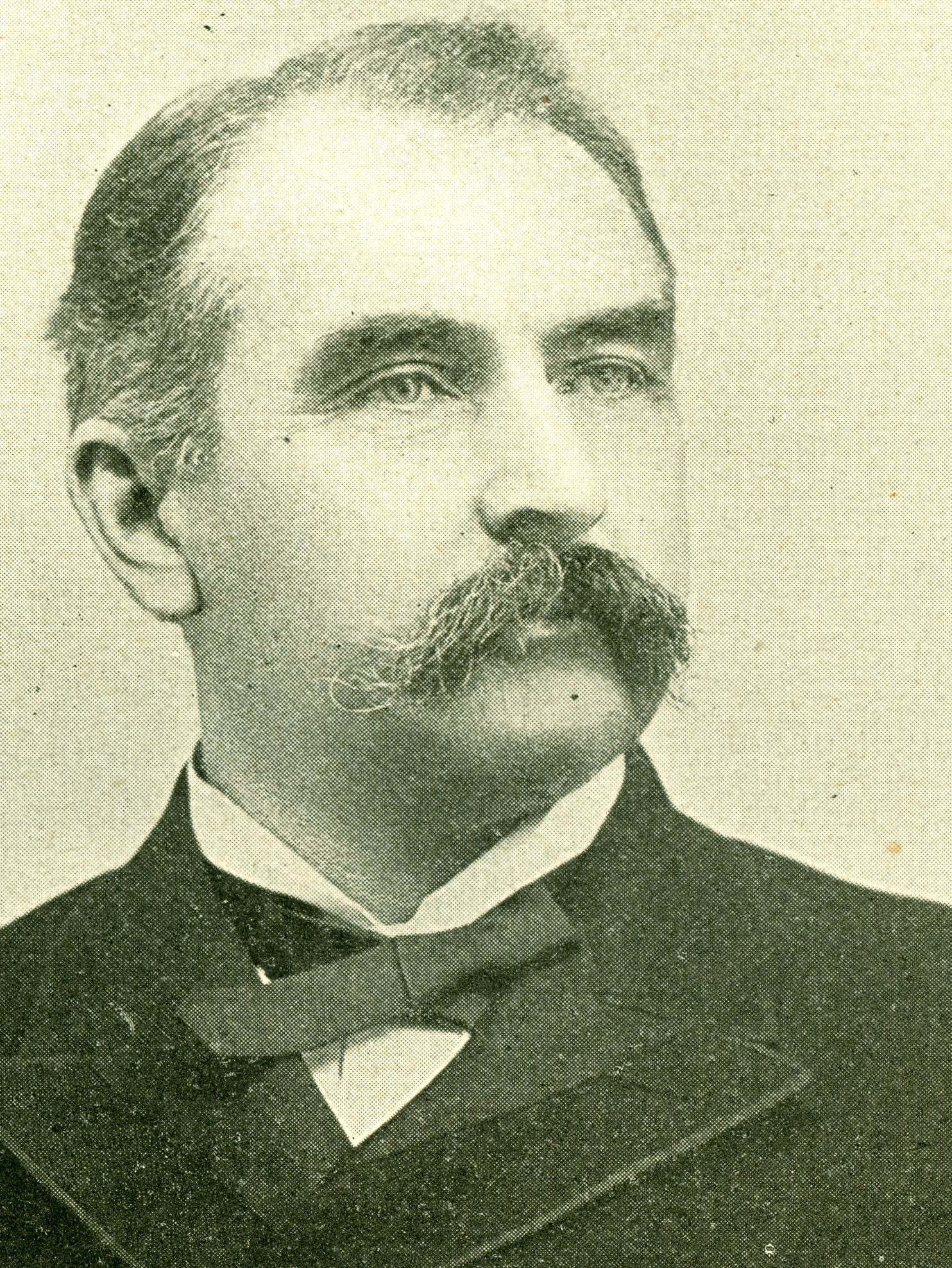

23rd Governor of Indiana
- In office January 9, 1893 – January 11, 1897
- Lieutenant: Mortimer Nye
- Preceded by: Ira Joy Chase
- Succeeded by: James A. Mount

25th Secretary of State of Indiana
- In office January 16, 1891 – January 9, 1893
- Governor: Ira Joy Chase
- Preceded by: Charles F. Griffin
- Succeeded by: Myron D. King

Member of the Indiana House of Representatives
- In office 1876–1878

Personal details
- Born: December 14, 1845 Bethel, Kentucky, U.S.
- Died: August 28, 1898 (aged 52) Vermillion County, Indiana, U.S.
- Party: Democratic
- Spouse: Martha Renick Whitcomb
- Children: 2

Claude Matthews (December 14, 1845 – August 28, 1898) was an American politician who served as the 23rd governor of the U.S. state of Indiana from 1893 to 1897. A farmer, he was nominated to prevent the loss of voters to the Populist Party. The Panic of 1893 occurred just before he took office, leading to severe economic problems during his term. Republicans took the Indiana General Assembly in the 1894 mid-term election and repudiated many of the Democrats' laws, leading to violence in the assembly. A popular party figure when he left office, he was a nominee to run for president at the 1896 Democratic National Convention, but lost his bid for the nomination to William Jennings Bryan.

== Early life ==
=== Family and background ===
Matthews was born in Bethel, Kentucky, on December 14, 1845, the son of Thomas A. and Eliza Ann Fletcher Matthews. His mother died when he was four months old, and his father sent him to be raised by an aunt in Kentucky. His father remarried in 1858, and he returned to live with them near Danville, Kentucky. He worked on the family's farm and attended Centre College and graduated in 1867. The same year he moved to Clinton, Indiana, where he met Martha Whitcomb, the daughter of former state governor James Whitcomb. The couple married on January 1, 1868, and had three children.

=== Early political career ===
Matthews purchased a farm and began to raise livestock and produce grain. He became prominent in the area because of his breeding program and the qualify cattle and horses he produced. In 1872 he was one of the founding members of the National Association of Breeders of Short-Horn Cattle. In 1876 he was elected to a seat in the Indiana House of Representatives and served a single term. In 1882 he ran for the state senate, but was defeated.

In 1890, Democratic party leaders approached Matthews and encouraged him to run for Indiana Secretary of State. He was one of several men the party was grooming as a potential candidate for governor in the upcoming election. Democrats at that time were losing members to the Populist Party, and were seeking farmers to lead the party and help win back farming voters. He campaigned against Republican John B. Stoll and won the election by 20,000 votes. He continued in that office for two years before resigning to run for governor. He used his position to become a well-known advocate of the unlimited coinage of silver.

== Governorship 1893-1897 ==
=== 1892 election ===
Matthews was nominated to run as the Democratic candidate for governor in 1892 and ran in the fall election against incumbent Republican governor Ira Joy Chase and Populist candidate Leroy Templeton. The campaign focused primarily on depressed farm prices and farmers desires to inflate the currency to alleviate debt problems. Matthews won the election by seven thousand votes. The Populist party failed to make significant gains in the state, and the election marked the party's decline in the state.

Shortly before Matthews took office, the national economy was struck by the Panic of 1893, caused in part by the inflationary acts of the government, which Matthews supported in the campaign. In Indiana, it led to a large rise in unemployment, the bankruptcy of most of the state railroad companies, the collapse of many state banks, business failures, and a collapse in land value. Matthews came into office with projected budget shortfalls and threats of worker strikes across the state.

=== Strikes ===
Coal miners in southern Indiana made good on their threats and joined in a national strike. The strikers attacked railroad tracks to prevent strikebreakers from sending out shipments. Matthews called out nine companies of militia and sent them to forcibly break up the strikers and protect coal shipments. As the militia arrived to resolve the situation, and second large strike broke out in Hammond, as railroad workers seized control of an important railroad hub in northern Indiana, effectively shutting down a large part of the state's exporting via Lake Michigan. Matthews called up additional militia and dispatched them to break up the second strike.

The legislature was not in session when Matthews ordered the militia to duty, but they approved of his actions when they gathered later in the year. Because they had not approved the call-up, no funds had been appropriated for paying the men, and Matthews borrowed over $40,000 on his personal credit to pay for the operations. The legislature agreed to reimburse him for his expense. In addition to fighting strikers, Matthews continued the policy of the previous governors of suppressing white cap organizations in the southern part of the state. Matthews had advocated in the campaign the banning of horse racing and prize fighting in the state. He successfully pressed the General Assembly to pass legislation banning the enterprises. He then dispatched the militia and state police to seize the horse tracks and fighting arenas in the state.

=== Conflict with the General Assembly ===
As the 1894 mid-term elections neared, Republicans were able to secure blame for the poor economic situation on the Democrats, and swept into power in the statehouse, taking strong majorities in both houses. The legislative districts created in 1890 were a subject of intense debate at the time; the legislature during the term of Governor Isaac P. Gray had created several gerrymander districts that favored Democrats. Republicans had contested the districting in the courts, who ruled the state must be redistricted. The Democrats had done so in 1893, but the Republicans overrode their redistricting upon taking power, and created their own plan which effectively reversed the situation and created pro-Republican gerrymander districts.

The Republicans continued in their effort to repudiate the decade of Democratic control and passed a controversial bill that revoked all the legislation passed by the previous Democratic-controlled General Assembly and restored the governor's power to appoint people to office. The bill was passed on the final day of the legislative session, knowing that if the governor did not veto it before adjournment, it would become law. It arrived on Matthews's desk just minutes before adjournment; he promptly vetoed it and ran with his secretaries to try to return it to the assembly before it adjourned. He found the doors locked and called for help from fellow Democrats to beat down the door to the House of Representatives. A newspaper recorded that "Democrats and Republicans fought like beasts of forest" as the governor struggled to deliver the vetoed bill to the speaker. Republicans successfully beat back the Democrats just as the speaker declared an adjournment. Fighting continued for a half-hour after the adjournment before the Democrats withdrew. Matthews took the issue to the Indiana Supreme Court, who ruled in favor of the Assembly, effectively rolling back a decade of Democratic legislation.

=== 1896 presidential bid ===
Before his term as governor ended, Matthews was nominated by David Turpie to run for president at the 1896 Democratic National Convention held in Chicago. Matthews was a leading candidate until the sixth ballot when his supporters switched to William Jennings Bryan after Bryan delivered an impassioned speech. Matthews left office and returned to his farm.

=== Later life and death ===
He continued making occasional public appearances and delivering speeches. While delivering a speech in Montgomery County, he suffered a stroke and died three days later in an Indianapolis hospital on August 28, 1898. His body was returned to his home town and buried in a Clinton cemetery.

== Electoral history ==
Indiana gubernatorial election, 1892
Party	Candidate	Votes	%
Democratic	Claude Matthews	233,881	47.5
Republican	Ira Joy Chase (incumbent)	214,302	46.2
Populist	Leroy Templeton	22,401	3.5
Prohibition	Aaron Wirth	12,960	1.1

== See also ==
- List of governors of Indiana

Party political offices
Preceded by Courtland C. Matson	Democratic nominee for Governor of Indiana; 1892	Succeeded by Benjamin F. Shively
Political offices
Preceded by Ira Joy Chase	Governor of Indiana; January 9, 1893 – January 11, 1897	Succeeded by James A. Mount
