= 1864 Indiana gubernatorial election =

- October 11, 1864
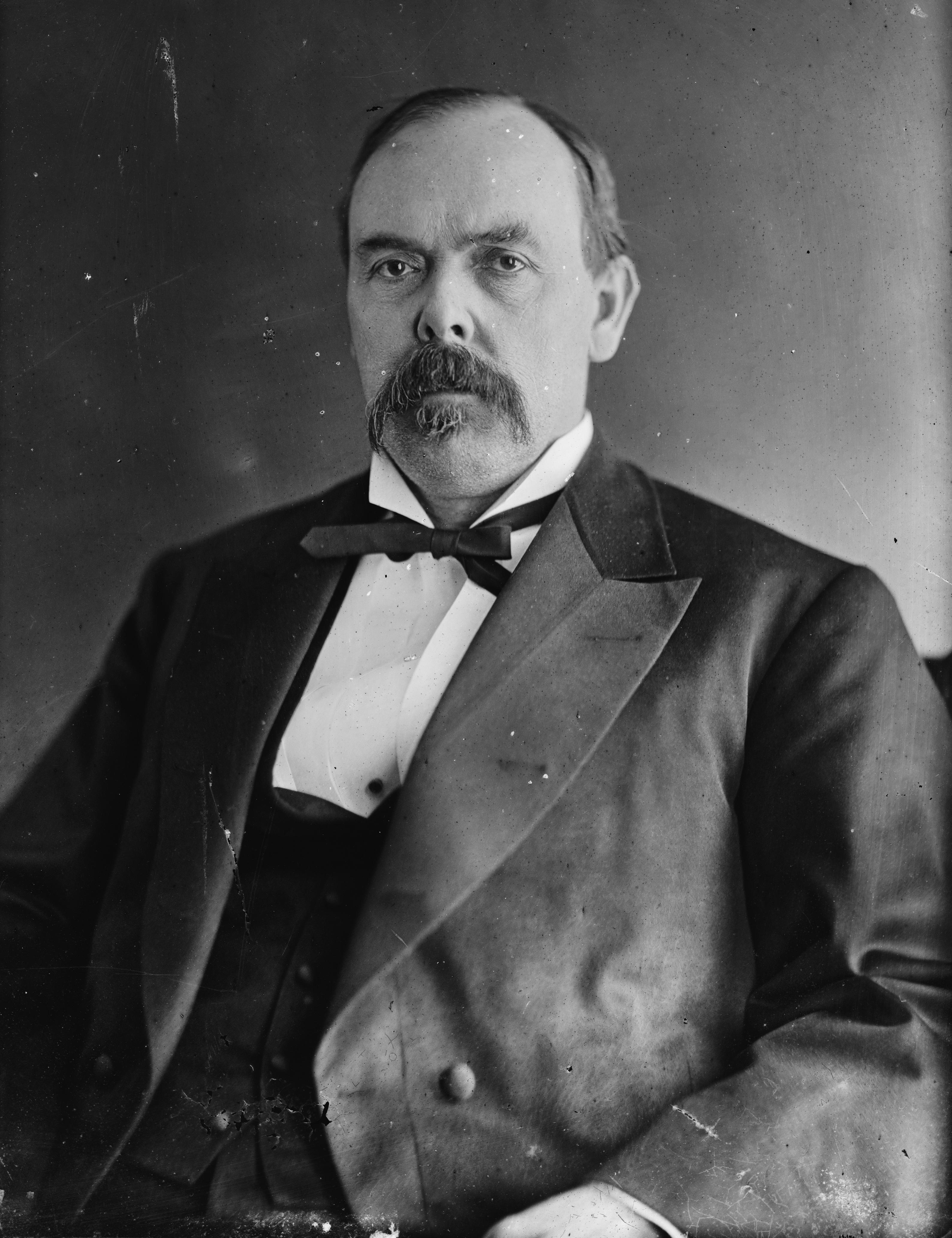

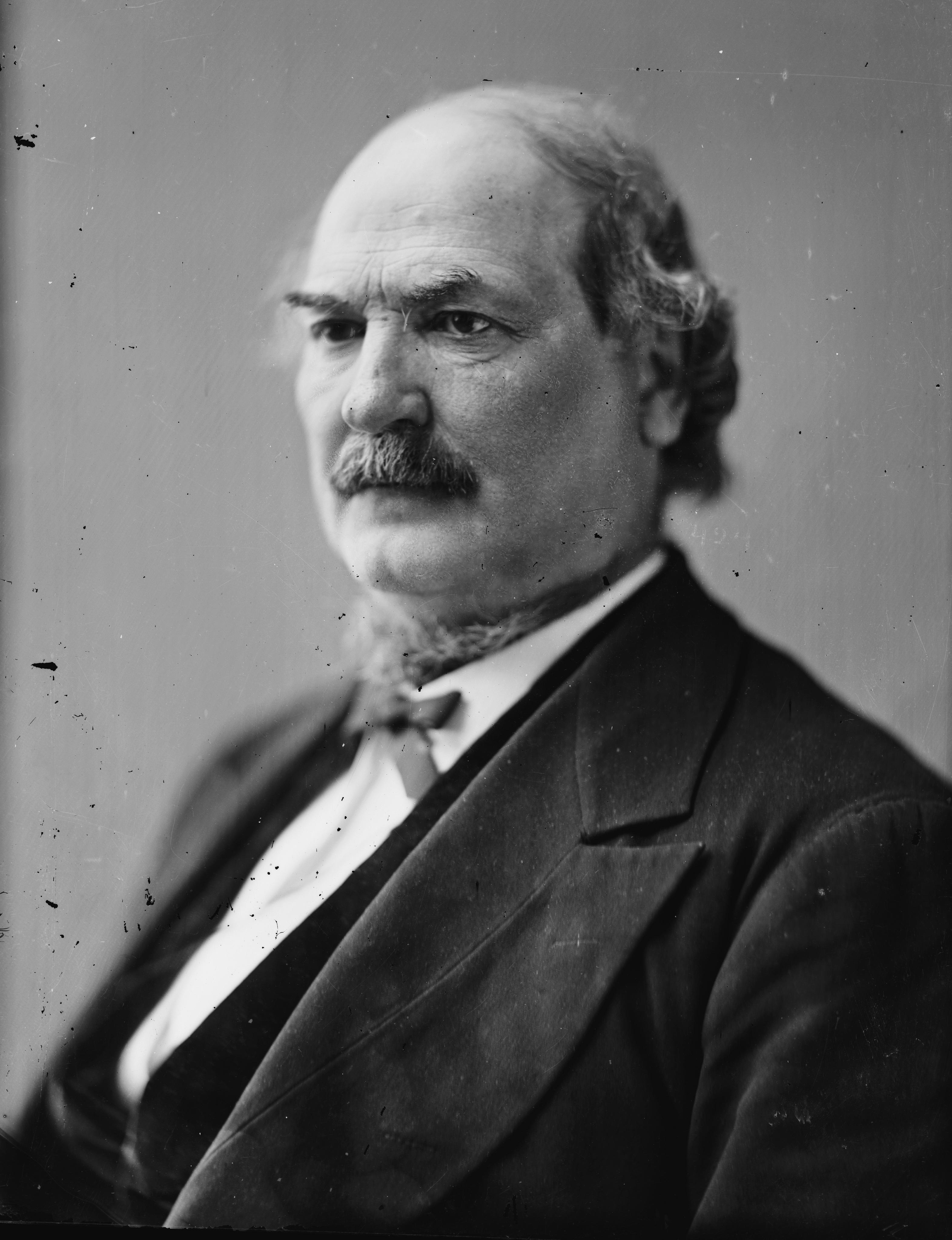
Nominee	Oliver P. Morton	Joseph E. McDonald
Party	National Union	Democratic
Popular vote	152,275	131,200
Percentage	53.72%	46.28%
- County results Morton: 50–60% 60–70% 70–80% McDonald: 50–60% 60–70% 70–80% 80–90%
Governor before election
Oliver P. Morton
Republican
Elected Governor
Oliver P. Morton
National Union

The 1864 Indiana gubernatorial election was held on October 11, 1864. The incumbent Union governor Oliver P. Morton defeated the Democratic former Indiana Attorney General Joseph E. McDonald.

== Results ==
1864 Indiana gubernatorial election
Party	Candidate	Votes	%	±%
National Union	Oliver P. Morton (incumbent)	152,275	53.72%	
Democratic	Joseph E. McDonald	131,200	46.28%	
Majority		21,075		
Turnout				
National Union gain from Republican		Swing		
