= 1884 Democratic National Convention =

American political convention

- 1884 presidential election
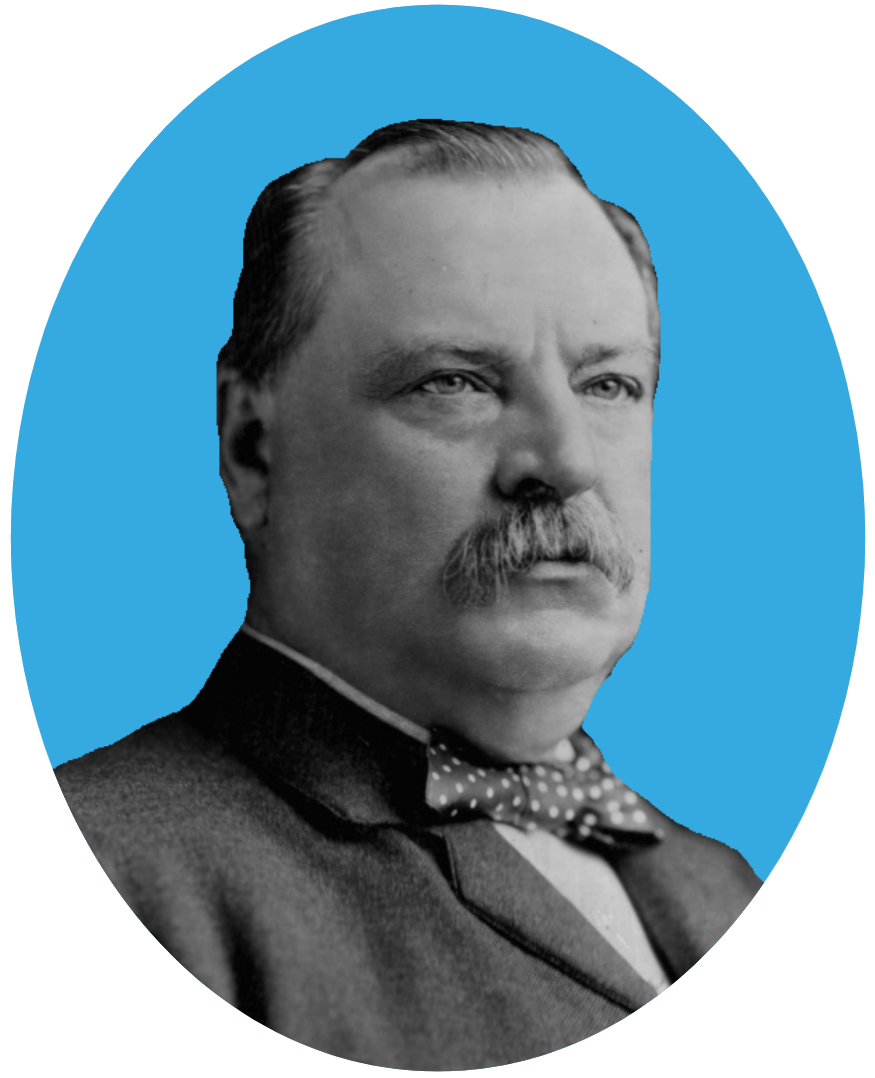
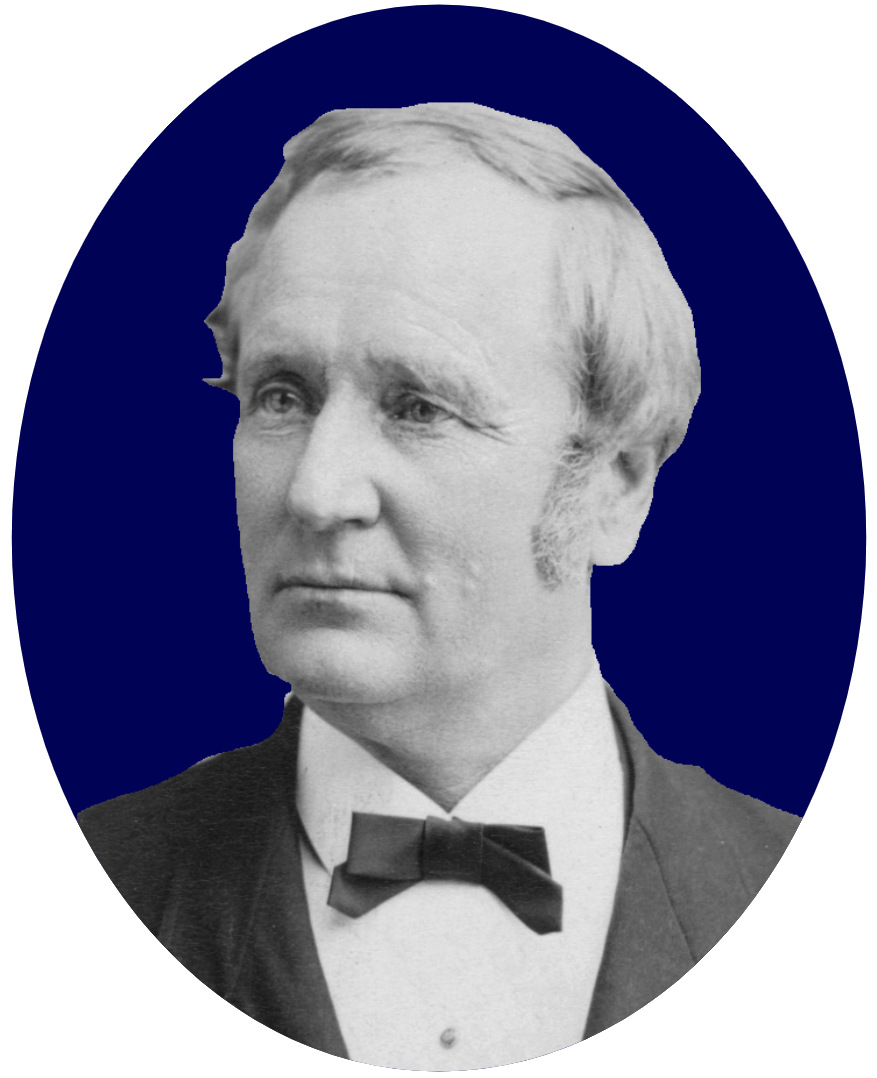
- Nominees; Cleveland and Hendricks

Convention
- Date(s): July 8–11, 1884
- City: Chicago, Illinois
- Venue: Exposition Building

Candidates
- Presidential nominee: Grover Cleveland of New York
- Vice-presidential nominee: Thomas A. Hendricks of Indiana

The 1884 Democratic National Convention was held July 8–11, 1884 and chose Governor Grover Cleveland of New York their presidential nominee with the former Governor Thomas A. Hendricks of Indiana as the vice presidential nominee.

== Background ==
The leading candidate for the presidential nomination was New York Governor Grover Cleveland, as Cleveland's reputation for good government made him a national figure.

The Republican Party nominated James G. Blaine for president in June 1884, although he had been implicated in a financial scandal: many influential Republicans were outraged, believing the time had come for a national reform administration, and walked out of the convention. These Republicans were called mugwumps, and declared that they would vote for the Democratic candidate based on his integrity.

== Presidential nomination ==
=== Candidates ===
Governor Grover Cleveland of New York

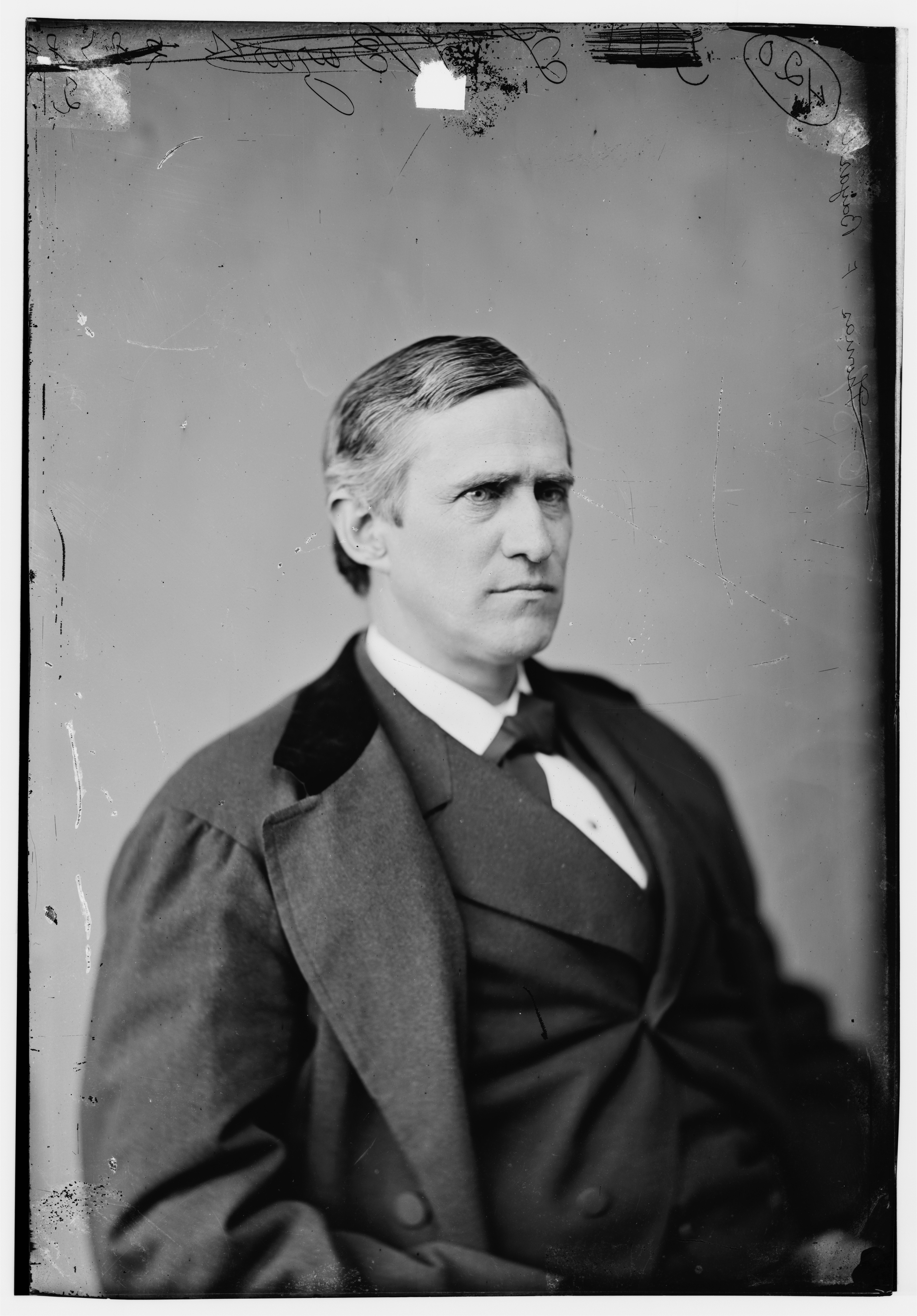
Senator Thomas F. Bayard of Delaware

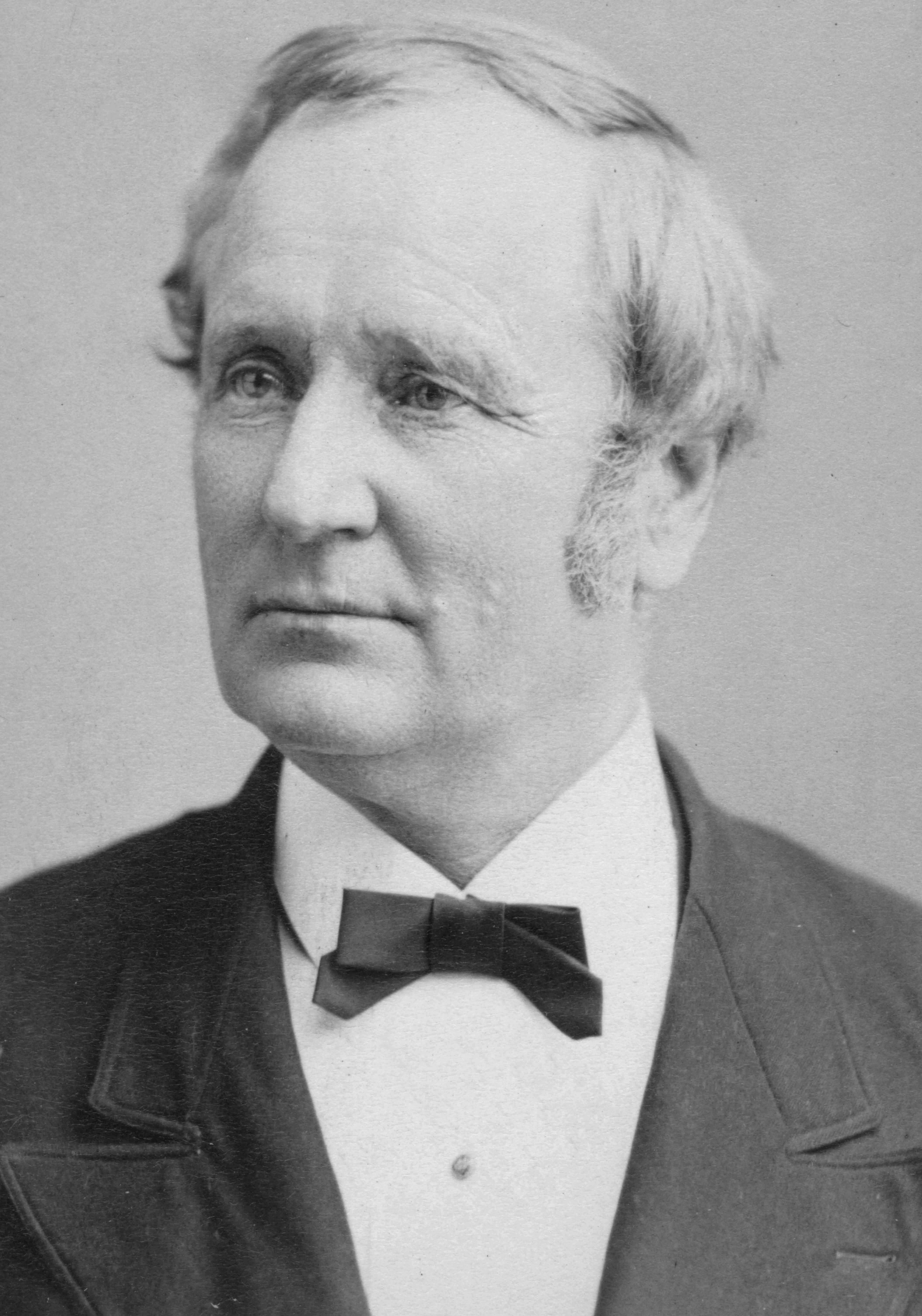
Former Governor Thomas A. Hendricks of Indiana

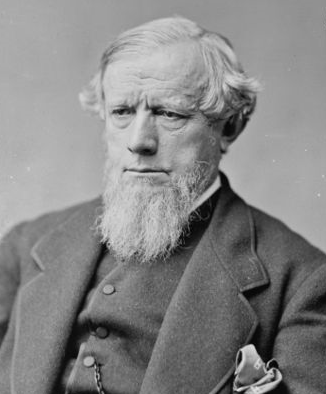
Former Senator Allen G. Thurman of Ohio

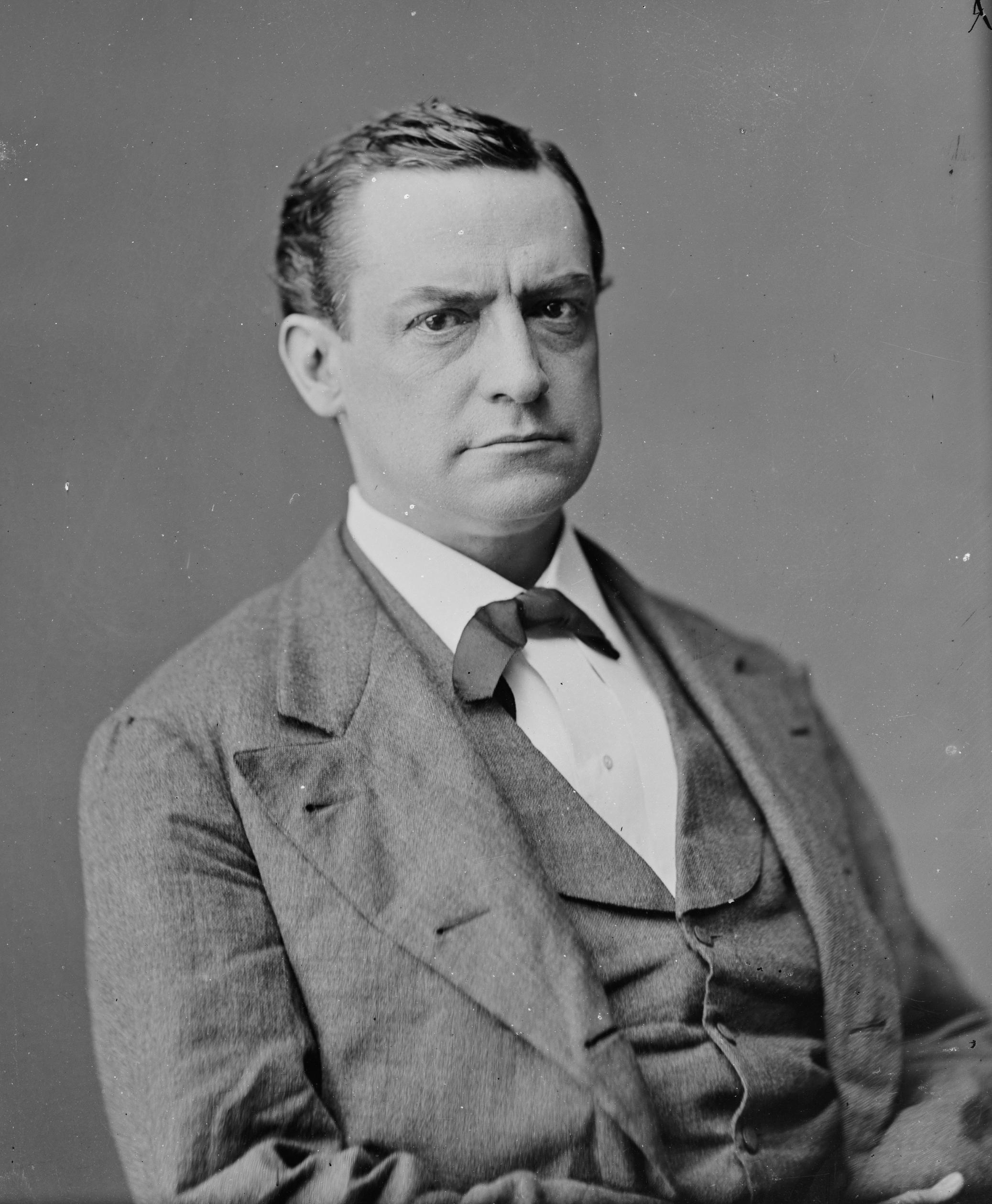
Former House Speaker Samuel J. Randall of Pennsylvania

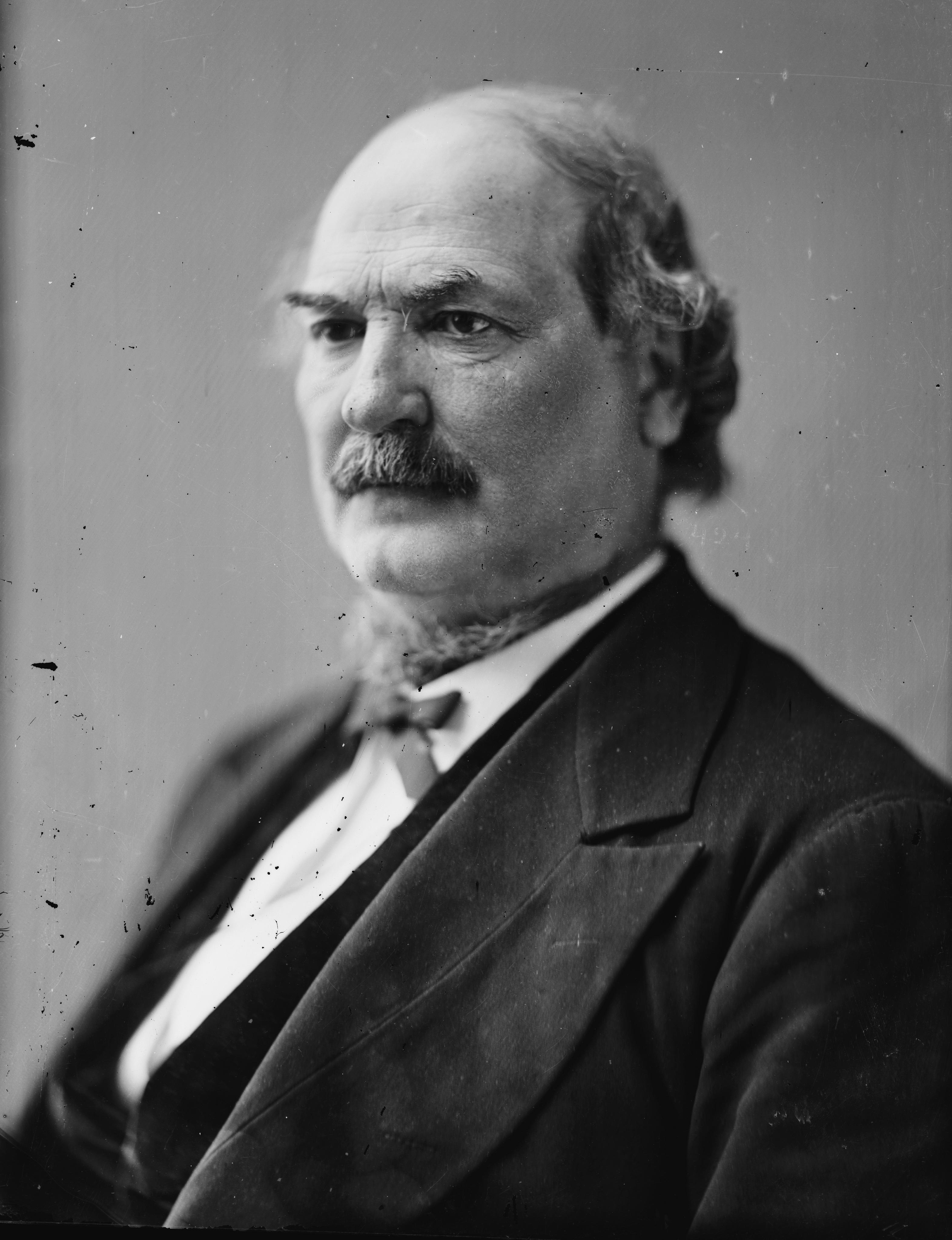
Former Senator Joseph E. McDonald of Indiana

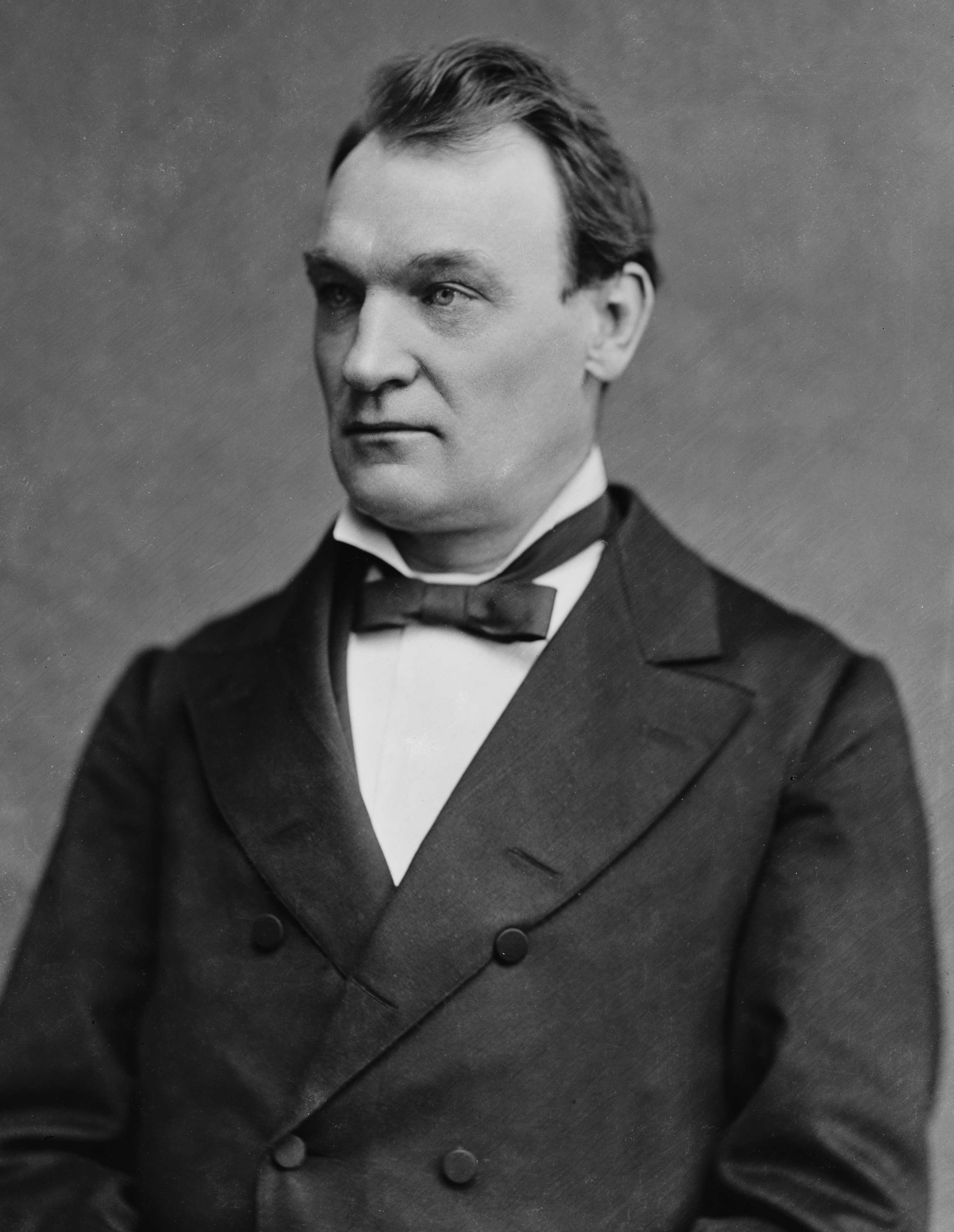
House Speaker
John G. Carlisle

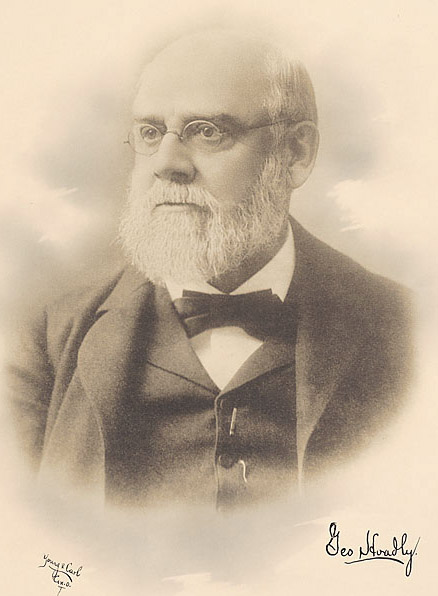
Governor George Hoadly of Ohio

Diagram of Convention Hall, Chicago, site of the 1884 Democratic National Convention.

Seven names were placed in nomination: Grover Cleveland, Thomas F. Bayard, Allen G. Thurman, Samuel J. Randall, Joseph E. McDonald, John G. Carlisle, and George Hoadly.

Thomas A. Hendricks professed that he was not a candidate for the presidential nomination. When a delegate from Illinois cast the only vote he received on the first ballot, Hendricks rose to ask this vote be withdrawn because it "wrongly" placed him before the convention. Nonetheless, Hendricks made an impressive showing on the second ballot but it was not enough to prevent the nomination of Cleveland.

Presidential Ballot
	1st	2nd (Before Shifts)	2nd (After Shifts)
Cleveland	392	475	683
Bayard	170	151.5	81.5
Hendricks	1	123.5	45.5
Thurman	88	60	4
Randall	78	5	4
McDonald	56	2	2
Carlisle	27	0	0
Flower	4	0	0
Hoadly	3	0	0
Tilden	1	2	0
Not Voting	0	1	0

Source: US President - D Convention. Our Campaigns. (August 26, 2009).

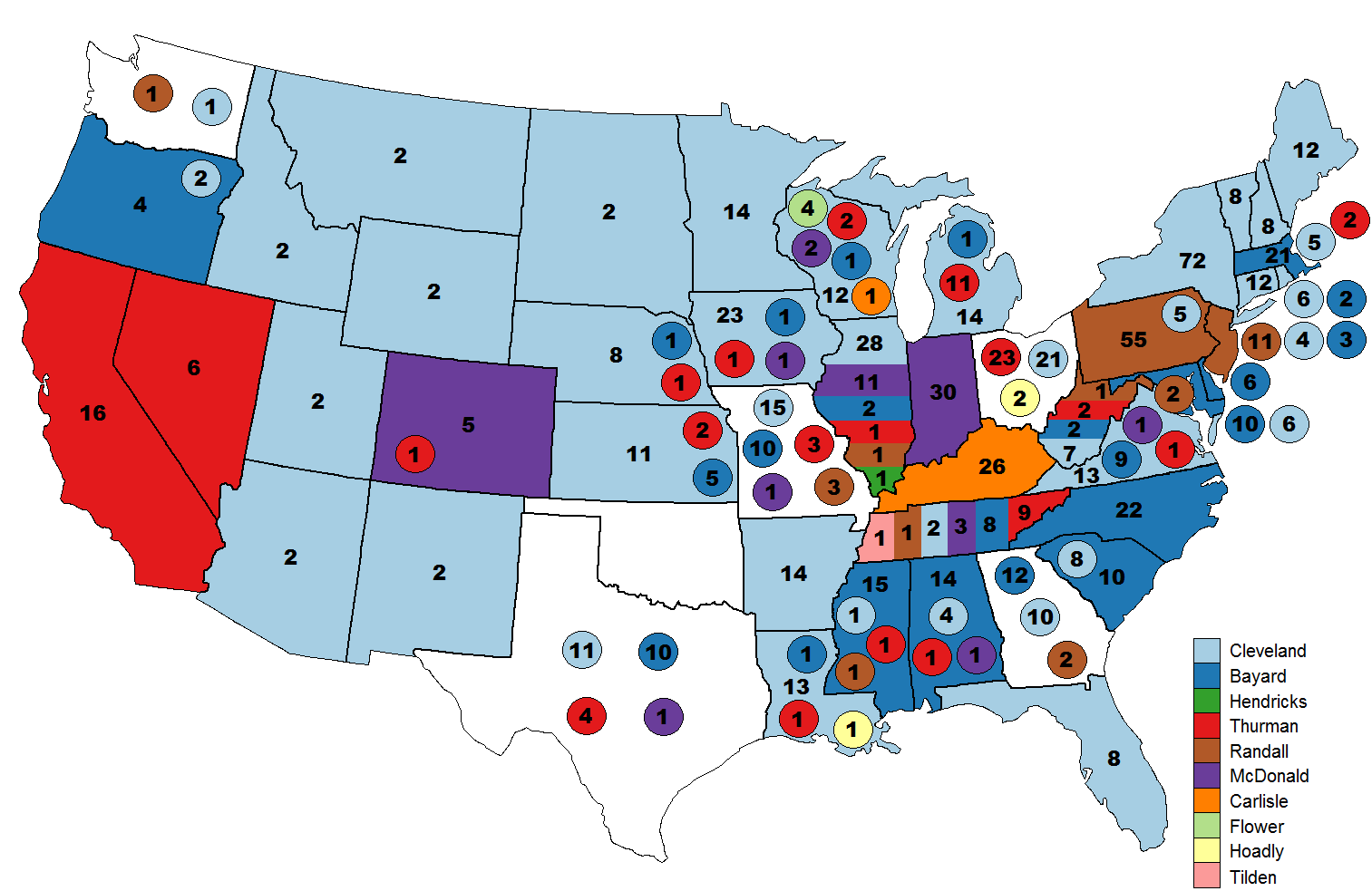
1st Presidential Ballot

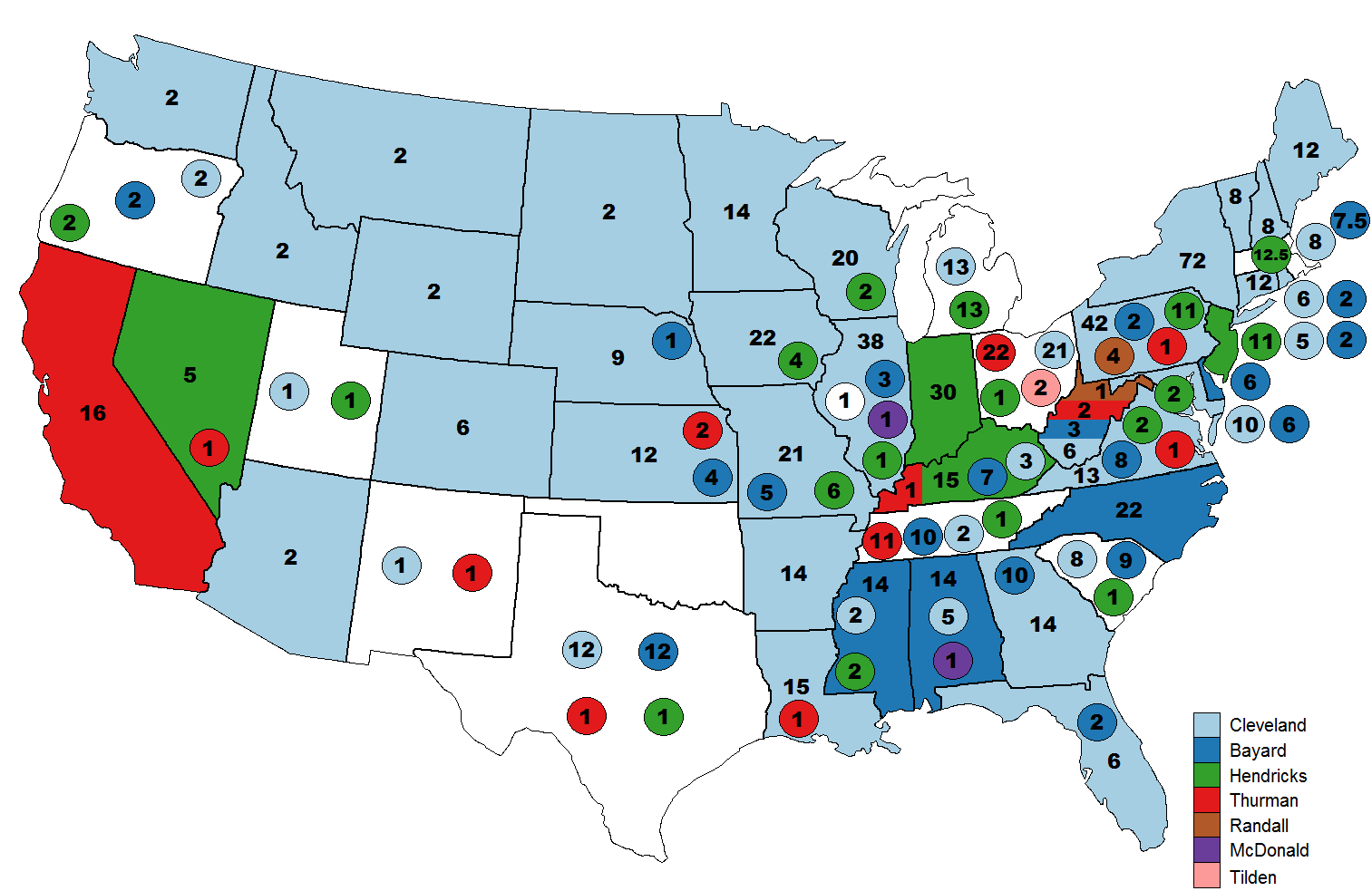
2nd Presidential Ballot
Before Shifts

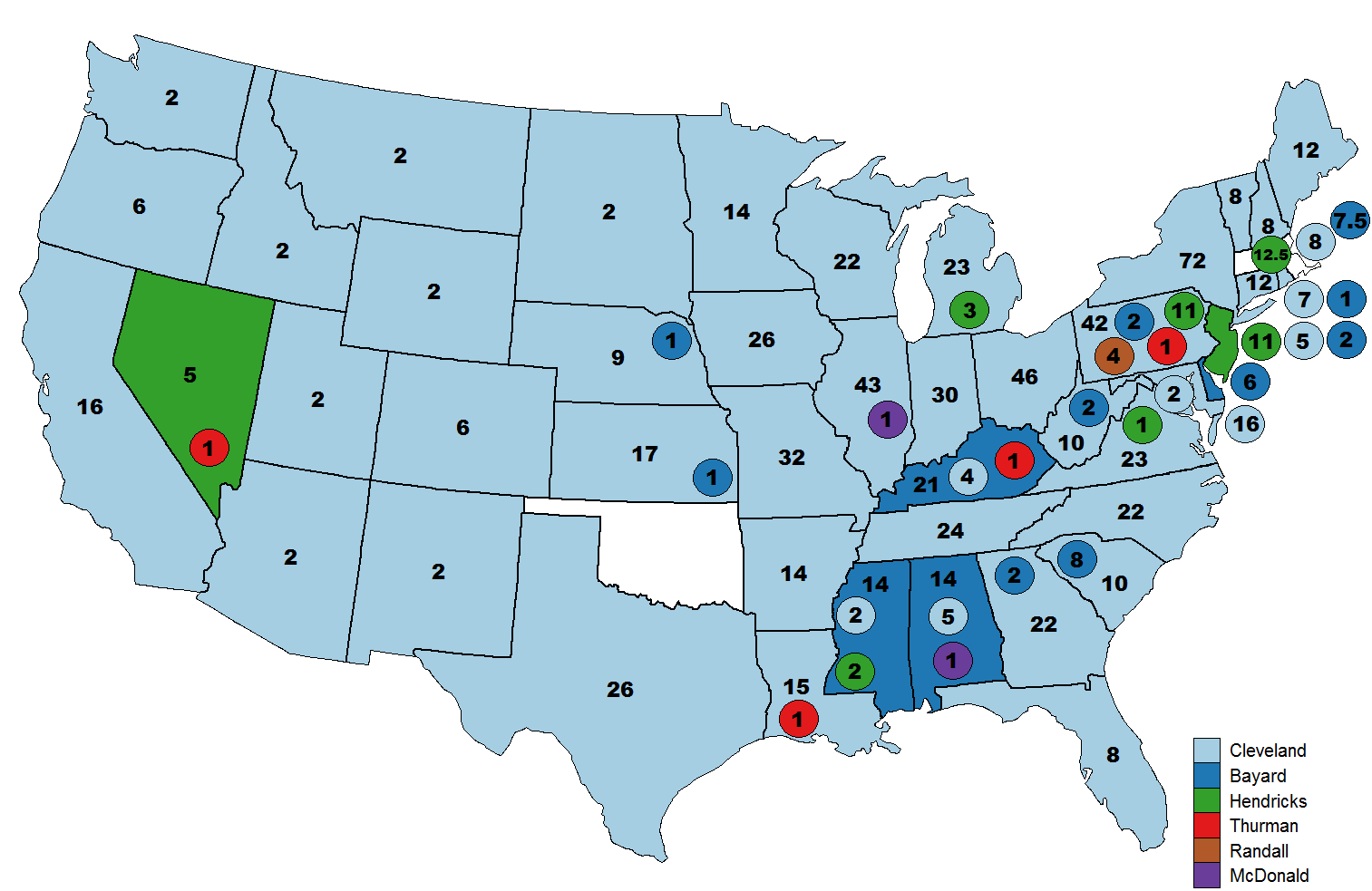
2nd Presidential Ballot
After Shifts

== Vice presidential nomination ==
Hendricks, who was the 1876 Democratic vice presidential nominee, was offered the 1884 nomination and accepted.

=== Vice presidential candidates ===
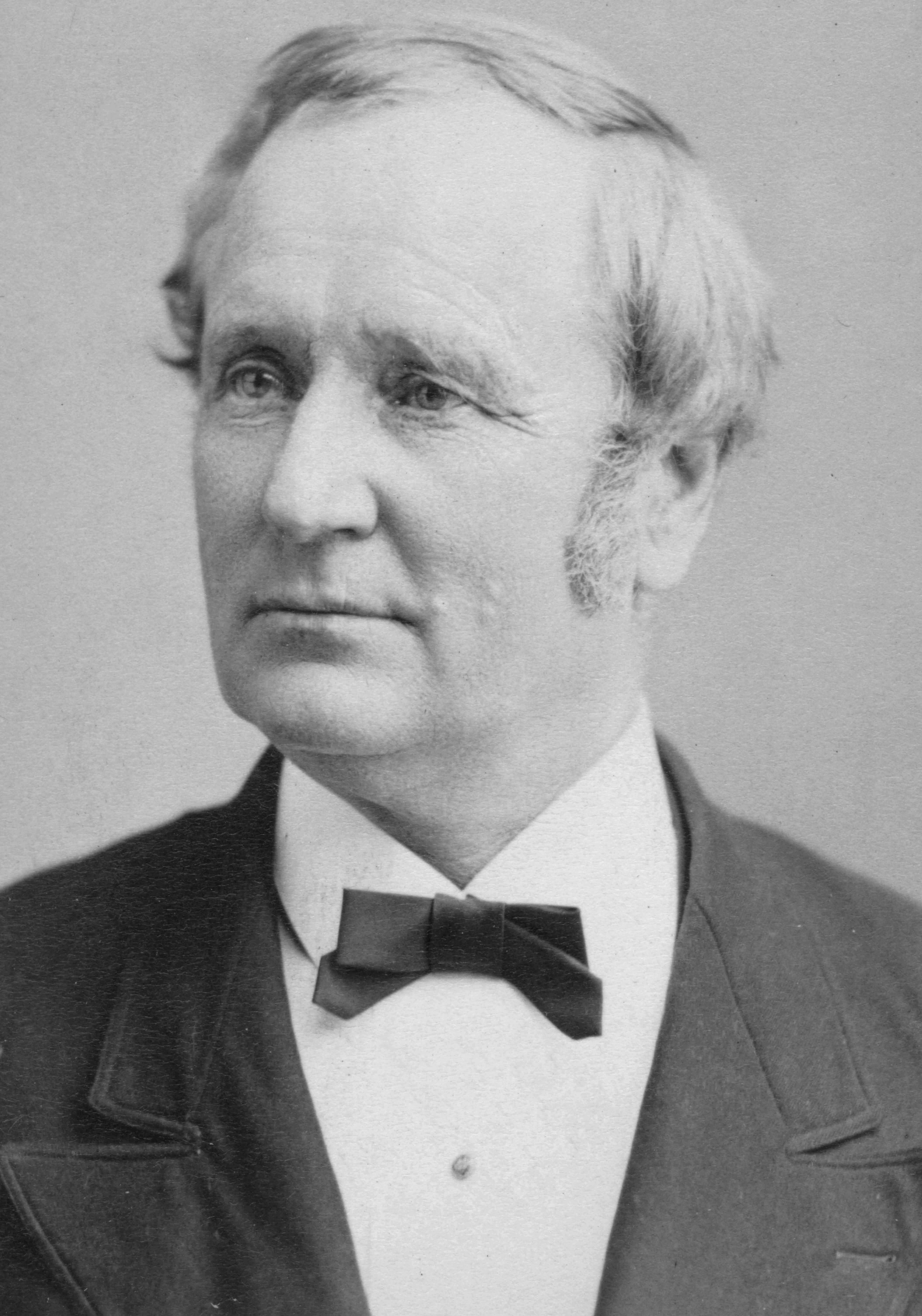
Former Governor Thomas A. Hendricks of Indiana

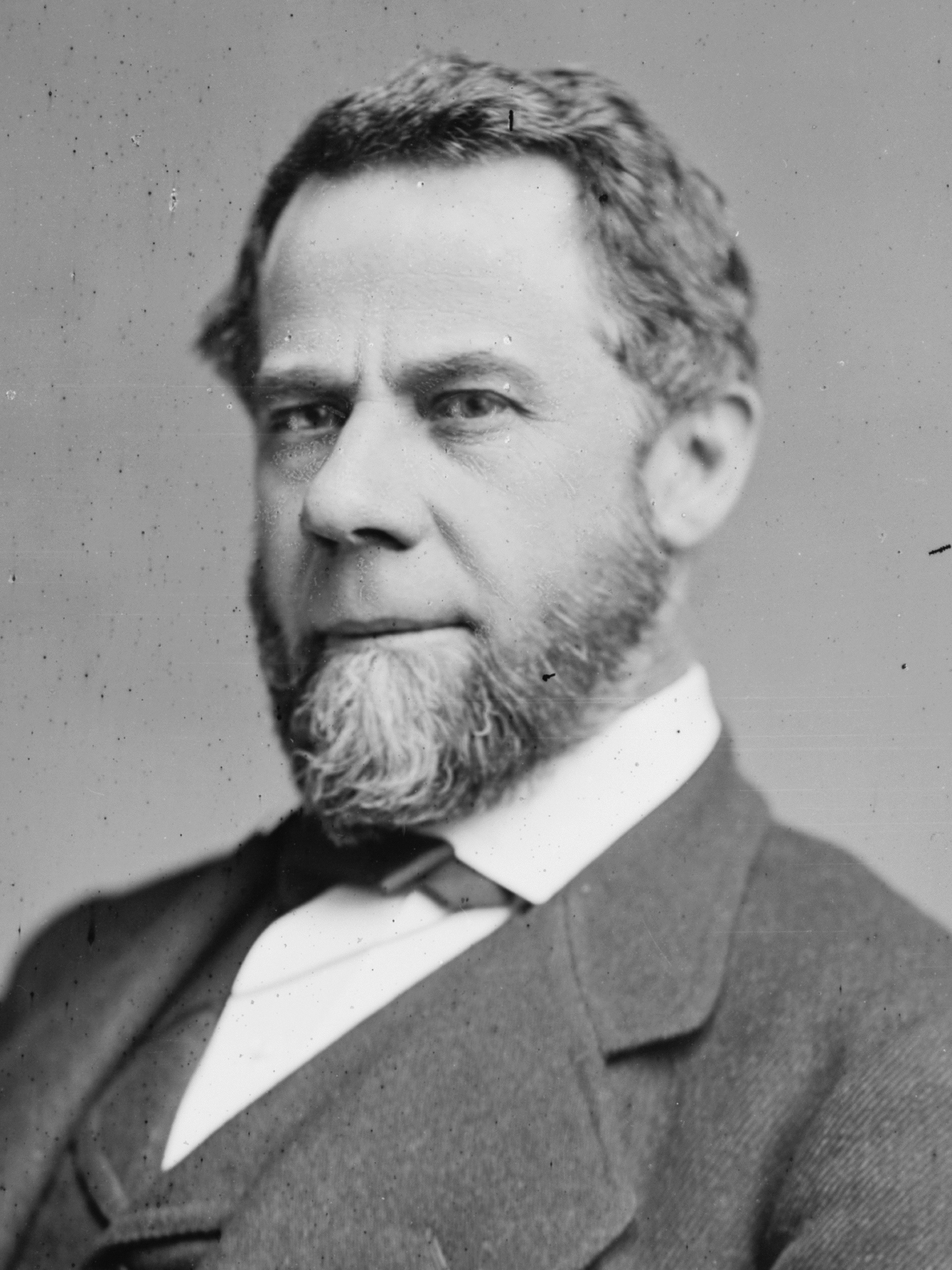
Former Senator
Henry G. Davis
of West Virginia
(Not Nominated)

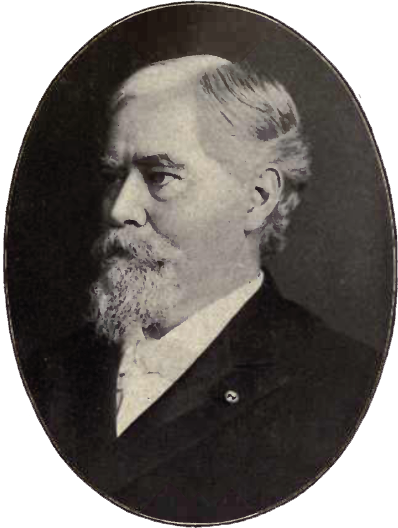
Brevet Brigadier General John C. Black
of Illinois
(Withdrawn)

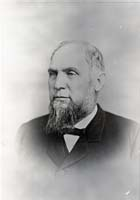
Governor
George W. Glick
of Kansas
(Withdrawn)

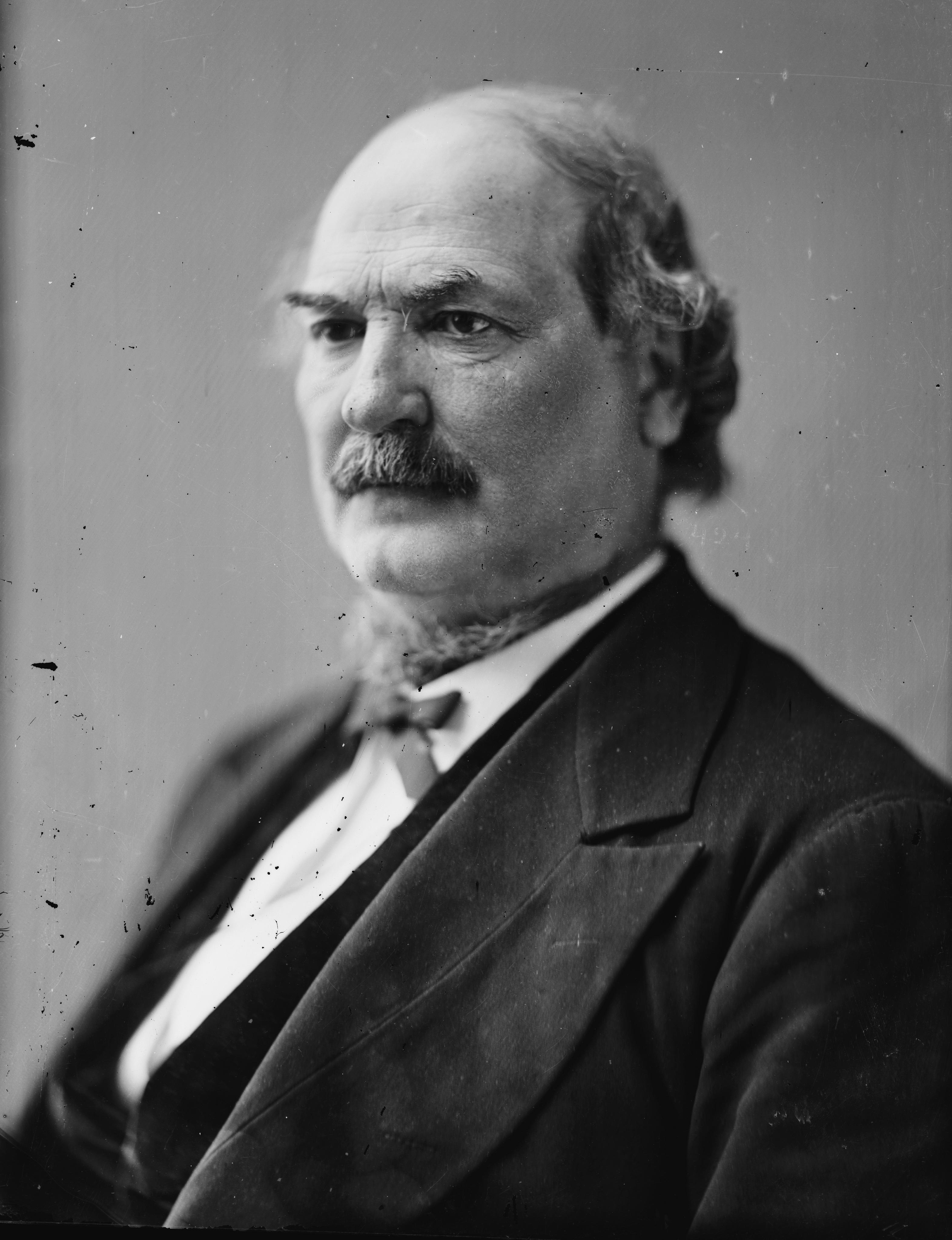
Former Senator
Joseph E. McDonald
of Indiana
(Withdrawn)

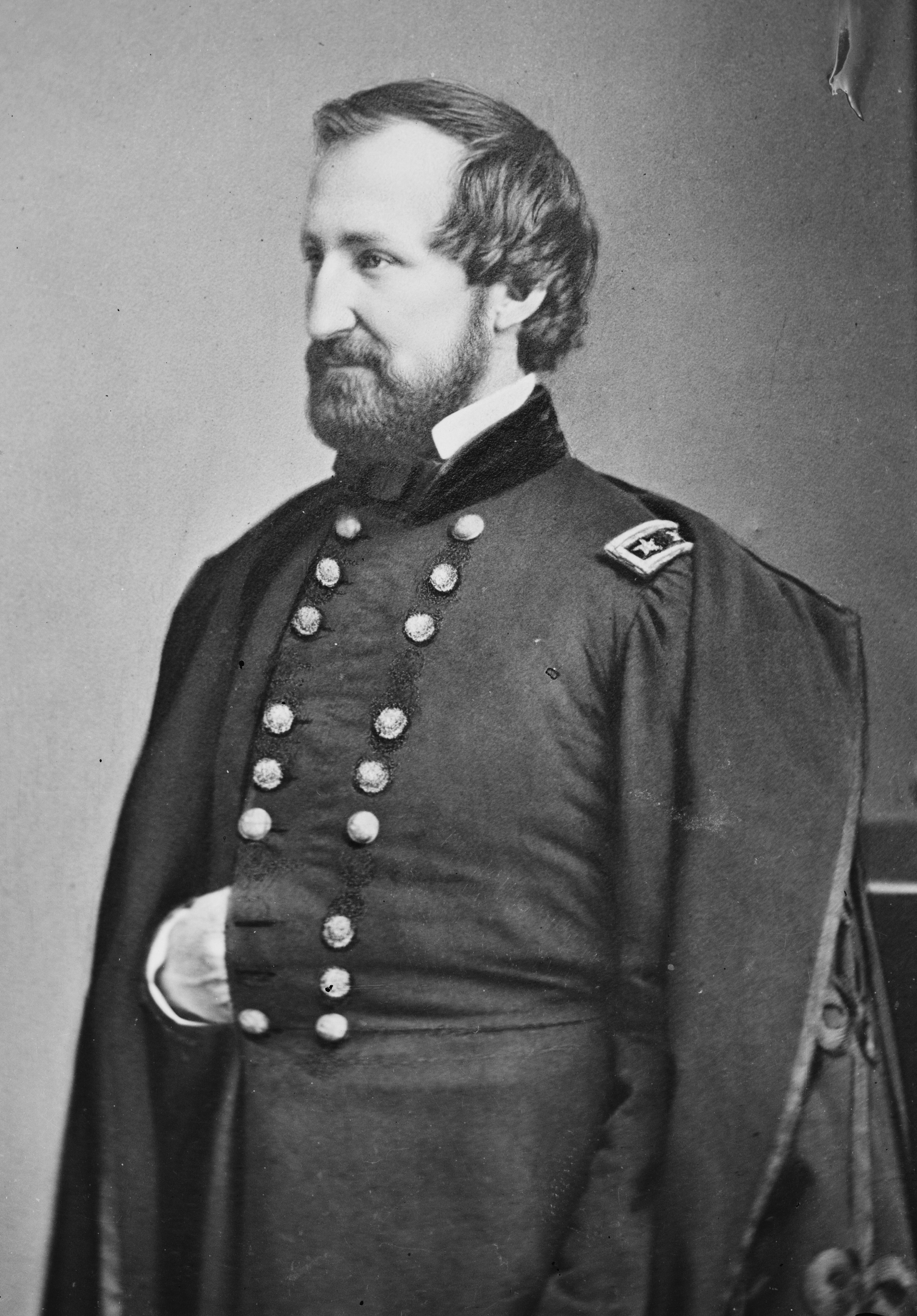
Major General
William Rosecrans
of California
(Withdrawn)

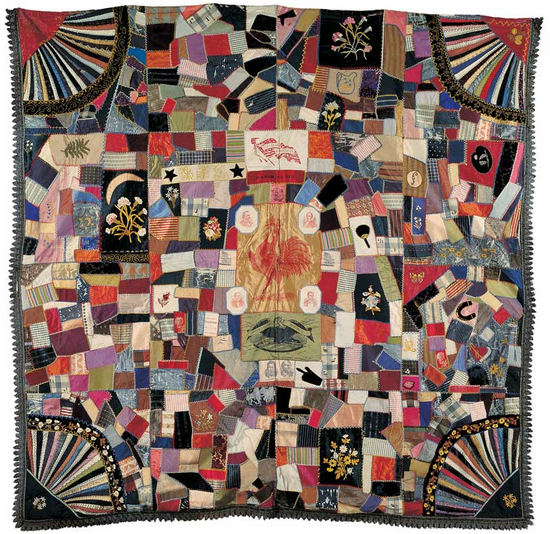
A crazy quilt in support of the Democratic ticket from the collection of the American Folk Art Museum, featuring the Democratic Rooster (precursor of the Donkey) at center and photos of Cleveland and Hendricks below.

Thomas A. Hendricks of Indiana was overwhelmingly nominated as the Democratic vice-presidential candidate after the names of John C. Black, George W. Glick, Joseph E. McDonald, and William Rosecrans were withdrawn from consideration.

Vice Presidential Ballot
Thomas A. Hendricks	816
Abstaining	4

Source: US Vice President - D Convention. Our Campaigns. (August 26, 2009).

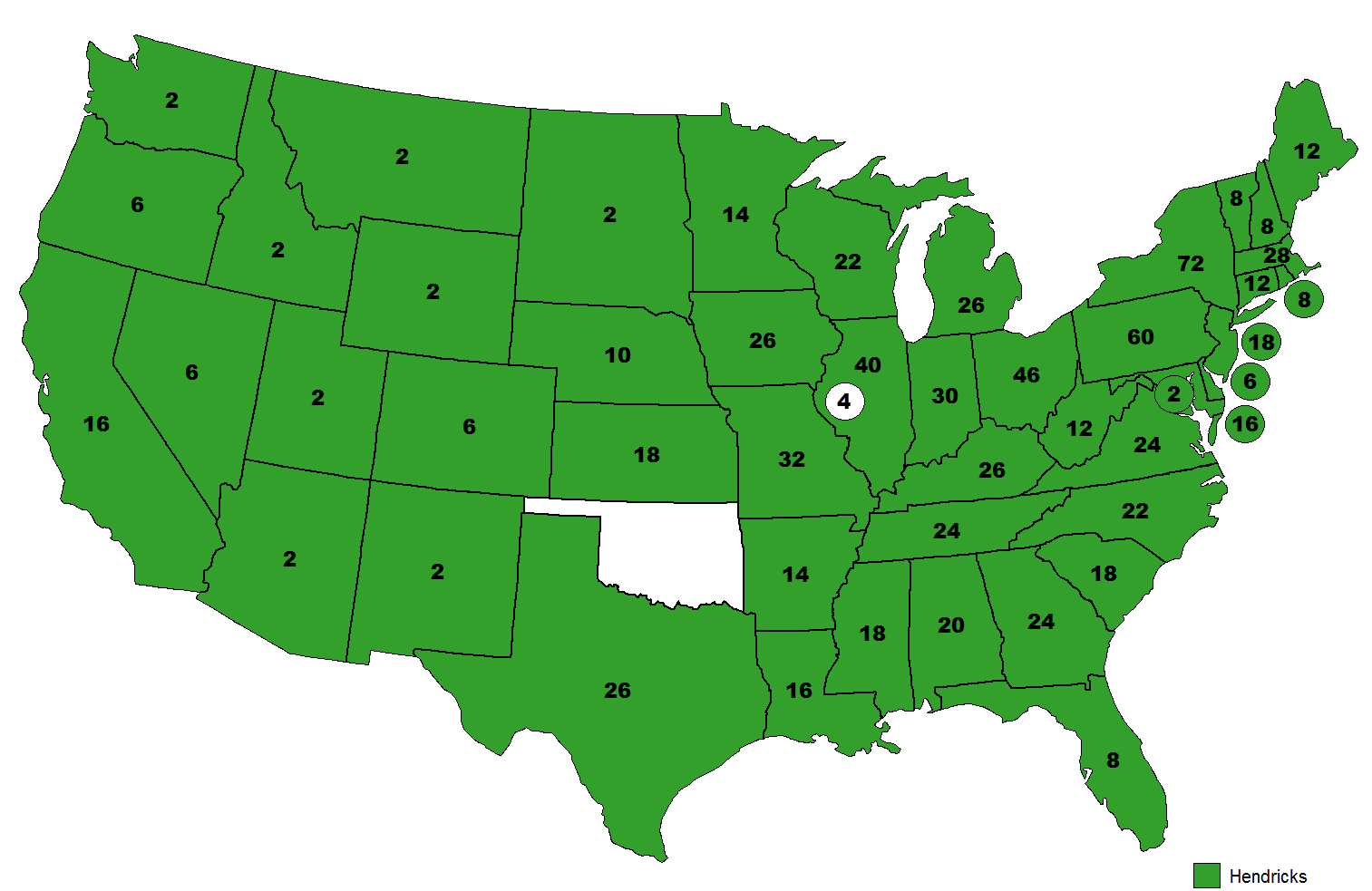
1st Vice Presidential Ballot

== See also ==
- Grover Cleveland 1884 presidential campaign
- History of the United States Democratic Party
- U.S. presidential nomination convention
- 1884 Republican National Convention
- List of Democratic National Conventions
- 1884 United States presidential election

== Footnotes ==
Preceded by 1880; Cincinnati, Ohio	Democratic National Conventions	Succeeded by 1888; St. Louis, Missouri
