= Alvin Peterson Hovey =

American judge

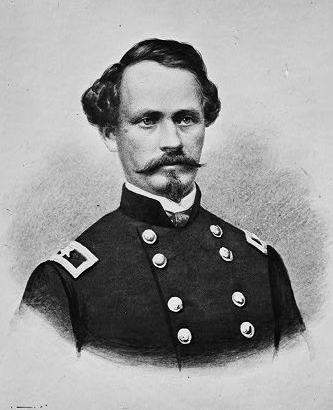
- Alvin P. Hovey as a brigadier general.

21st Governor of Indiana
- In office January 14, 1889 – November 23, 1891
- Lieutenant: Ira Joy Chase
- Preceded by: Isaac P. Gray
- Succeeded by: Ira Joy Chase

Member of the U.S. House of Representatives from Indiana's 1st district
- In office March 4, 1887 – January 17, 1889
- Preceded by: John J. Kleiner
- Succeeded by: Francis B. Posey

United States Minister to Peru
- In office May 22, 1866 – September 22, 1870
- Preceded by: Christopher Robinson
- Succeeded by: Thomas Settle

Indiana Supreme Court Justice
- In office May 8, 1854 – January 1, 1855
- Preceded by: Addison Roache
- Succeeded by: Samuel Gookins

Personal details
- Born: September 6, 1821 Mount Vernon, Indiana, U.S.
- Died: November 23, 1891 (aged 70) Indianapolis, Indiana, U.S.
- Party: Republican

Military service
- Allegiance: United States; Union
- Branch/service: United States Army; Union Army
- Years of service: 1844–1846; 1860–1865
- Rank: Brigadier General; Brevet Major General
- Commands: 24th Indiana Infantry Regiment; 12th Division, XIII Corps; 1st Division, XXIII Corps
- Battles/wars: Mexican–American War; American Civil War

Alvin Peterson Hovey (September 6, 1821 – November 23, 1891) was a Union general during the American Civil War, an Indiana Supreme Court justice, congressman, and the 21st governor of Indiana from 1889 to 1891. During the war he played an important role in the Western theatre, earning high approval from General Ulysses Grant, and uncovered a secret plot for an uprising in Indiana. As governor, he launched several legal challenges to the Indiana General Assembly's removal of his powers, but was mostly unsuccessful. He successfully advocated election reform before he died in office.

== Early life ==
=== Family and background ===
Alvin Peterson Hovey was born in Mount Vernon, Indiana, on September 6, 1821, to Abiel and Francis Hovey. His father died while he was a young boy, and his mother died in 1836, when he was just fifteen, leaving him orphaned. His youth was spent in poverty, and after being sent to an orphanage following his mother's death, he received a basic education before being turned out at age eighteen. Hovey wanted to become a lawyer, and went work as a bricklayer by day, and studied law at night in the office of John Pitcher, a Mount Vernon attorney in 1840. After over three years of study in the office, he was admitted to bar in 1843 and opened his own law office.

Hovey was propelled into the state spotlight in 1849 when he was appointed to oversee the estate of the deceased William Maclure. McClure was a wealthy idealist who was one of the co-founders of the failed utopian settlement of New Harmony, Indiana. In his will, he ordered that his estate be sold and the proceeds be used to fund the construction of libraries. His two siblings had already seized much of his estate, sold it, and made off with the funds. Hovey filed over sixty lawsuits to reclaim the assets of the estate, and use the proceeds for their intended purpose. The estate successfully funded the opening of 160 libraries in Indiana and Illinois. The case gained considerable press coverage around Indiana, and Hovey gained considerable popularity from his success. He met and married his wife Mary Ann in 1844, and the couple had five children. Only two of the children survived infancy.

=== Constitutionalist ===
Hovey was elected as a Democrat to serve as a delegate in 1850 to help create a new constitution for the state of Indiana. Hovey supported the educational and governmental reforms to the constitution, as well as being a driving force in some of the more controversial aspects of the constitution. He opposed the extension of suffrage to women and blacks, and proposed adding a section to the constitution to ban free blacks from Indiana. His proposal was accepted because it was viewed as a punishment to the southern states, who would be required to care for the free blacks. He also opposed the bankruptcy reforms, saying that it would grant too much protection from creditors, and encourage laziness. The constitution was approved by the public, but the anti-black portions were ruled unconstitutional by the U.S. Supreme Court two years later.

In 1854, Hovey was appointed by Governor Joseph A. Wright to fill a vacancy on the Indiana Supreme Court until an election could be held. At the time of his appointment, he was 34, making him the youngest justice in the history of the court. It also made him the only constitutional delegate to become the interpreter of a document which he himself had helped write. His most important decision was in voting to strike down taxing laws created by some townships to increase funding for their schools. His decision stated that the constitution required all state schools be funded uniformly. He campaigned to be elected to the Supreme Court, but was defeated having only served six months on the court.

In 1855, Hovey was appointed by United States President Franklin Pierce to serve as US Attorney for Indiana. The state Democratic party had been going through a period of internal problems over the slavery issue. The pro-slavery faction, led by Jesse D. Bright, expelled many anti-slavery members of the party including Hovey during the 1858 state convention. Bright was able to influence President James Buchanan to remove Hovey from office because of his position. Hovey responded by running for Congress against Democrat William E. Niblack as an Independent, but was defeated by a large margin. Hovey then joined the Republican Party, along with many of the other expelled Democrats.

== American Civil War ==
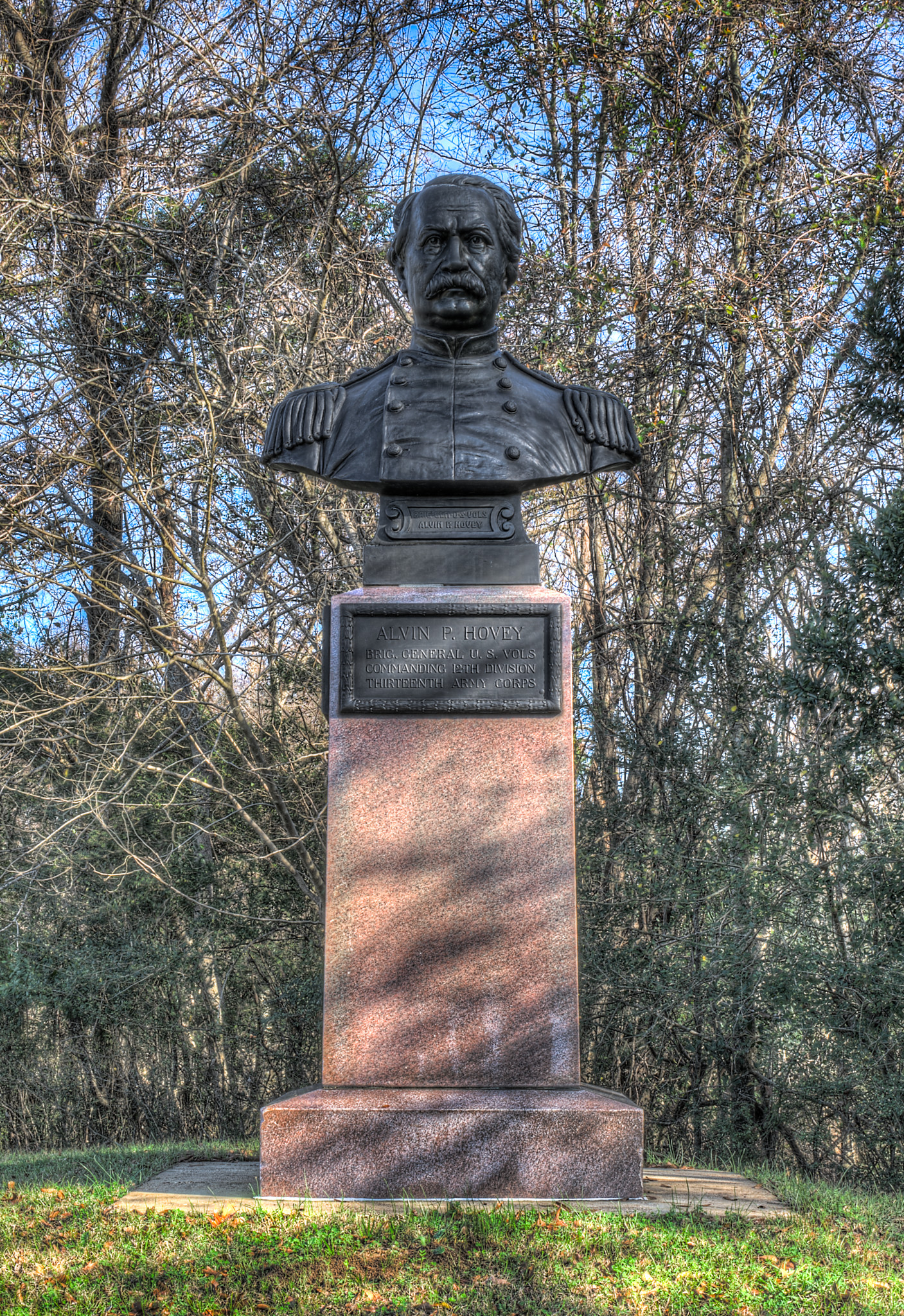
Bust of Hovey by George Brewster at Vicksburg National Military Park

=== Front lines ===
Immediately following the outbreak of the American Civil War in 1861, Hovey was commissioned as a colonel and organized the First Regiment of the Indiana Legion, a militia force that was used to defend the state during the war. Shortly thereafter, he was appointed colonel of the 24th Regiment Indiana Infantry. His regiment was quickly sent to the front-lines where he led it in the Battle of Shiloh in 1862. He remained with the advance elements of the main western Union army, and was promoted to brigadier general of United States Volunteers. During the siege of Corinth he commanded the 1st Brigade in Lew Wallace's 3rd Division. Hovey briefly commanded the District of Eastern Arkansas during the Fall of 1862 but returned to brigade command in the Army of the Tennessee in 1863.

On December 17, 1862, General Ulysses S. Grant issued his infamous, rabidly antisemitic General Order #11, expelling all Jews as a class from his military district (parts of Tennessee, Mississippi, & Kentucky). General Hovey was one of General Grant's most fervent supporters of Grant's Jewish Expulsion Order. President Abraham Lincoln, upon learning of General Grant's order expelling all Jews, immediately rescinded it.

In January Hovey was given command of the 12th Division in the XIII Corps. He led his division at the Battle of Champion Hill later that year earning the praise of General Ulysses S. Grant.

He again led his division in the Siege of Vicksburg, breaking Confederate control of the Mississippi River. Grant again praised Hovey as key to the siege's success. Shortly after the battle, he received word that his wife had died, and returned home to arrange for guardians for his children. Her death was deeply saddening to Hovey who was slow to recover emotionally. He returned briefly to the front in 1864 to the 1st Division in the XXIII Corps division during the Atlanta campaign. In August 1864 the 1st Division was discontinued and its regiments dispersed throughout the other divisions in the XXIII Corps. Hovey, without a command, again returned home. For the remainder of the war he was in command of the military District of Indiana. He resigned from the Union Army on October 7, 1865.

=== Sons of Liberty ===
Back in Indiana, Governor Oliver P. Morton placed Hovey in command of the Regular army and Indiana Legions units in the state. His primary task was overseeing recruitment and keeping anti-government activities under control. To accomplish the task, Hovey raised a division of ten-thousand troops, but would only accept unmarried men. Because of the young age of most of his soldiers, his division was nicknamed "Hovey's Babies." His investigations uncovered a network of southern sympathizers known as the Sons of Liberty and the Knights of the Golden Circle. He alleged the group had secret plans for an uprising in Indianapolis in August 1864. To prevent the plot, he had dozens of suspects arrested and taken before military tribunals for judgment. Several were sentenced to hanging, but their terms were commuted to life in prison. After the war, the U.S. Supreme Court ruled the trials unconstitutional in the case of Ex parte Milligan.

After the war ended, Hovey was brevetted as a major general before resigning from the army. He then remarried to Rosa Alice, the stepdaughter of Caleb B. Smith, in 1865. He was then appointed as Minister to Peru and dispatched to the country. Just prior to his departure, his new wife fell ill and died. During his time in Peru, the country was constantly at war with its neighbors and undergoing violent revolution. Hovey spent a good deal of his time trying to determine who was running the country on any given day. In 1870 he resigned from his post and returned to Mount Vernon where he resumed his law practice.

== Governor ==
=== Clash with General Assembly ===
In 1872, the Republican party entered Hovey's name as a candidate to run for governor, but he declined, claiming he was finished with politics. For the next fourteen years he continued operating his private law practice until 1886, he was nominated to run for Congress and accepted. He defeated his Democratic opponent J. E. McCullough 18,258 to 16,907. Two years later, he was nominated to run for Governor of Indiana. Benjamin Harrison was running for president that year and was immensely popular in the state. Despite his party ticket's popularity, he barely won the election, defeating Democrat Courtland C. Matson by a plurality, 49%–48.6% of the vote, and Democrats retained majorities in both houses of the Indiana General Assembly. At age sixty-eight, Hovey became the oldest man ever elected governor, up until that time.

In the last year of the term of Hovey's predecessor, Governor Albert G. Porter, the General Assembly had passed a series of laws weakening the governor's powers. The legislature pursued an agenda for the most part differing from the Governor's, and overrode most of his symbolic vetoes to enact it. Hovey attempted to reclaim some of the power taken by the legislature by taking many of their recent laws to the courts. They had removed all the governor's appointment powers, and the Indiana Supreme Court ruled in favor of the legislature in that matter. In another case, where the assembly had created state boards to run police, fire, and other departments at the local level, taking their control from Republican-controlled local governments, the courts ruled in favor of Hovey and declared the laws unconstitutional. In a fight over who had the right to appoint newly created department heads, the court ruled against both the assembly and the governor, stating that like all other departments heads must be elected in a general election.

=== Reforms ===
The only agenda item which Hovey was able to pass through the General Assembly was voter reform. The state for several election cycles had been the victim of serious voter fraud, and had among the least restrictive voter regulations in the nation. Parties created their own ballots, and were responsible for including their opponents on their ballots. This led to considerable trickery on the part of the parties who would deliberately make their ballot in a manner to increase the likelihood voters would choose their candidate, even accidentally. Vote buying had also become commonplace; that had led to a national scandal in the election of Benjamin Harrison. The reforms enacted created the secret ballot, standardized ballots, provided more supervision at polling stations, and gave the responsibility of creating ballots to the state.

Hovey had campaigned on dealing with the White Cap groups operating in southern Indiana. The vigilante groups had carried out several lynchings, including the Reno Gang, and had been carrying out other forms of vigilante justice, especially in Harrison and Crawford Counties. They often meted out corporal punishments to men who were believed to not be taking care of their family, local criminals, and alcoholics. Hovey launched investigations into the groups, and made known his intentions to put an end to their organizations. Although no arrests were made, the threat led to a significant decrease and eventual end to their activities.

== Death ==
In 1891, Hovey fell ill and died on November 23, 1891, and was succeeded by his Lieutenant Governor Ira Joy Chase. Hovey's body lay in state in Indianapolis before his remains were removed to his hometown for a funeral. He is buried in the Bellefontaine Cemetery near Mount Vernon, Indiana.

== Electoral history ==
Indiana gubernatorial election, 1888
Party	Candidate	Votes	%
Republican	Alvin P. Hovey	281,752	49
Democratic	Courtland C. Matson	280,603	48.8
Prohibition	JS Hughes	9,920	2.2

== See also ==
- List of governors of Indiana
- List of American Civil War generals (Union)

Party political offices
Preceded by William H. Calkins	Republican nominee for Governor of Indiana; 1888	Succeeded by Ira Joy Chase
Political offices
Preceded by Isaac P. Gray	Governor of Indiana; January 14, 1888 – November 23, 1891	Succeeded by Ira Joy Chase
U.S. House of Representatives
Preceded by John J. Kleiner	Member of the U.S. House of Representatives from Indiana's 1st congressional district March 4, 1887 – January 17, 1889	Succeeded by Francis B. Posey
Diplomatic posts
Preceded by Christopher Robinson	United States Minister to Peru; May 22, 1866 – September 22, 1870	Succeeded by Thomas Settle
