= 1888 Indiana gubernatorial election =

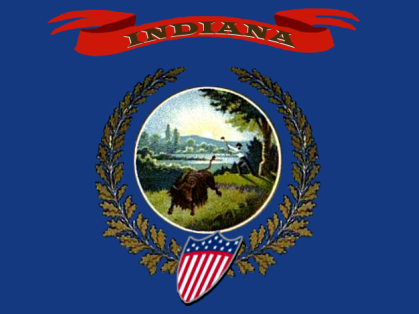
- November 6, 1888
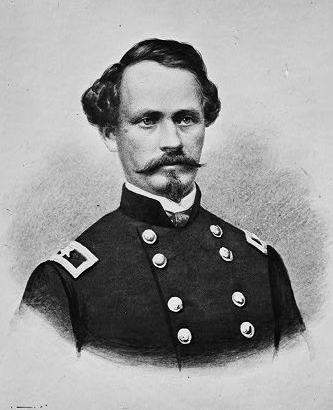

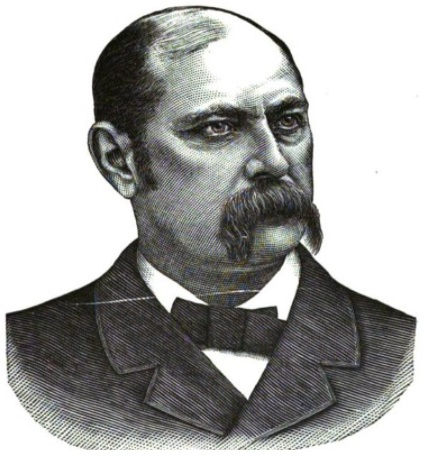
Nominee	Alvin Peterson Hovey	Courtland C. Matson
Party	Republican	Democratic
Popular vote	263,194	260,994
Percentage	49.03%	48.62%
- County results Hovey: 40–50% 50–60% 60–70% Matson: 40–50% 50–60% 60–70% 70–80%
Governor before election
Isaac P. Gray
Democratic
Elected Governor
Alvin Peterson Hovey
Republican

The 1888 Indiana gubernatorial election was held on November 6, 1888. Republican nominee Alvin Peterson Hovey defeated Democratic nominee Courtland C. Matson with 49.03% of the vote.

== General election ==
=== Candidates ===
Major party candidates

- Alvin Peterson Hovey, Republican, U.S. Representative
- Courtland C. Matson, Democratic, U.S. Representative

Other candidates

- Jasper Hughes, Prohibition
- John B. Mulroy, Union Labor

=== Results ===
1888 Indiana gubernatorial election
Party	Candidate	Votes	%	±%
Republican	Alvin Peterson Hovey	263,194	49.03%	
Democratic	Courtland C. Matson	260,994	48.62%	
Prohibition	Jasper Hughes	9,920	1.85%	
Union Labor	John B. Mulroy	2,702	0.50%	
Majority		2,200		
Turnout				
Republican gain from Democratic		Swing		
