= Joseph E. McDonald =

American politician (1819–1891)

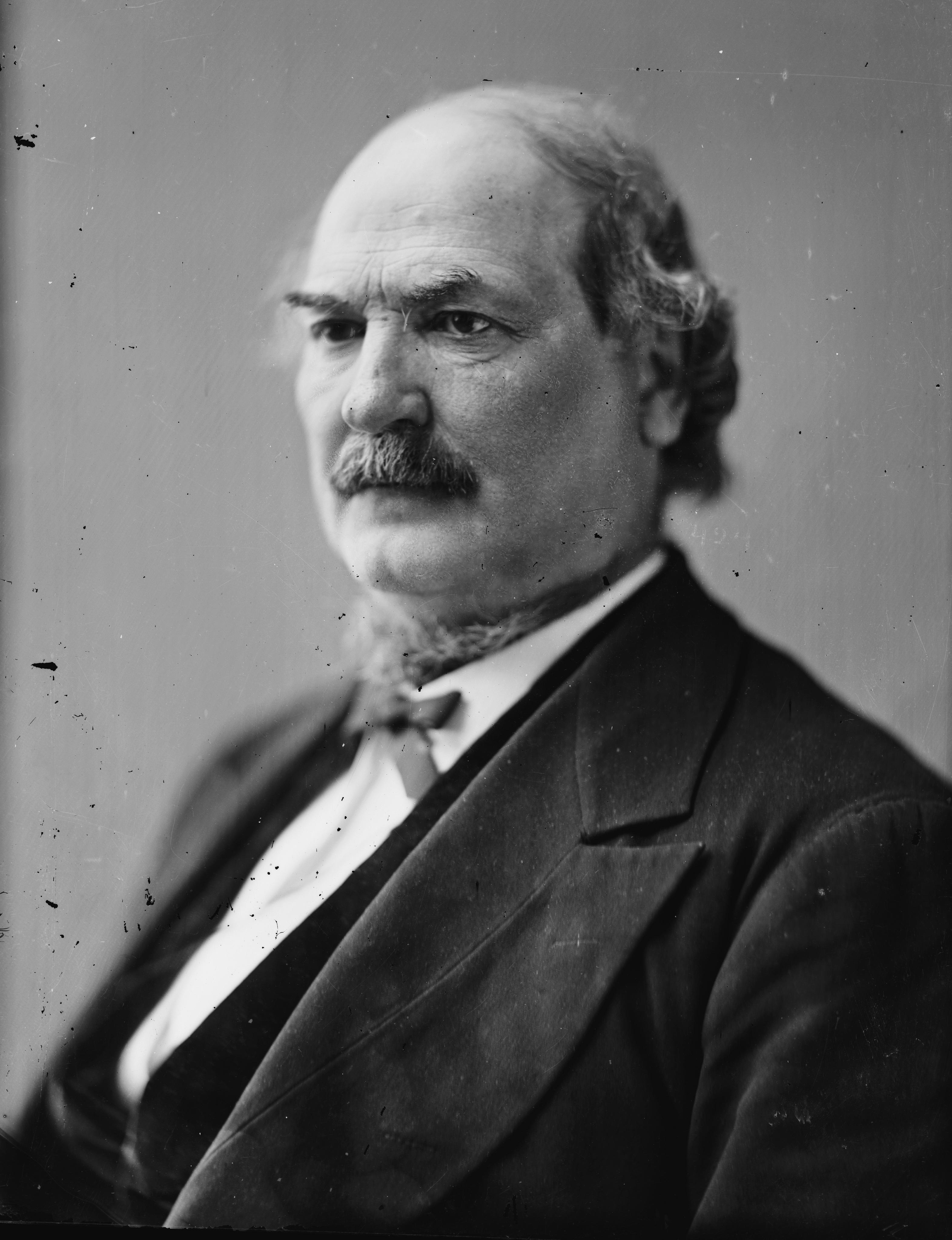

United States Senator from Indiana
- In office March 4, 1875 – March 3, 1881
- Preceded by: Daniel D. Pratt
- Succeeded by: Benjamin Harrison

Attorney General of Indiana
- In office 1856–1860
- Governor: Joseph A. Wright; Ashbel P. Willard
- Preceded by: James Morrison
- Succeeded by: James G. Jones

Member of the U.S. House of Representatives from Indiana's 8th district
- In office March 4, 1849 – March 3, 1851
- Preceded by: John Pettit
- Succeeded by: Daniel Mace

Personal details
- Born: Joseph Ewing McDonald; August 29, 1819 Butler County, Ohio, US
- Died: June 21, 1891 (aged 71) Indianapolis, Indiana, US
- Resting place: Crown Hill Cemetery and Arboretum, Section 13, Lot 13
- Party: Democratic
- Education: Wabash College, Asbury University
- Profession: Politician, lawyer, saddler

Joseph Ewing McDonald (August 29, 1819 – June 21, 1891) was an American politician who served as a United States representative and senator from Indiana. He also served as Indiana's second attorney general and unsuccessfully sought the Democratic presidential nomination in 1884.

== Life and career ==
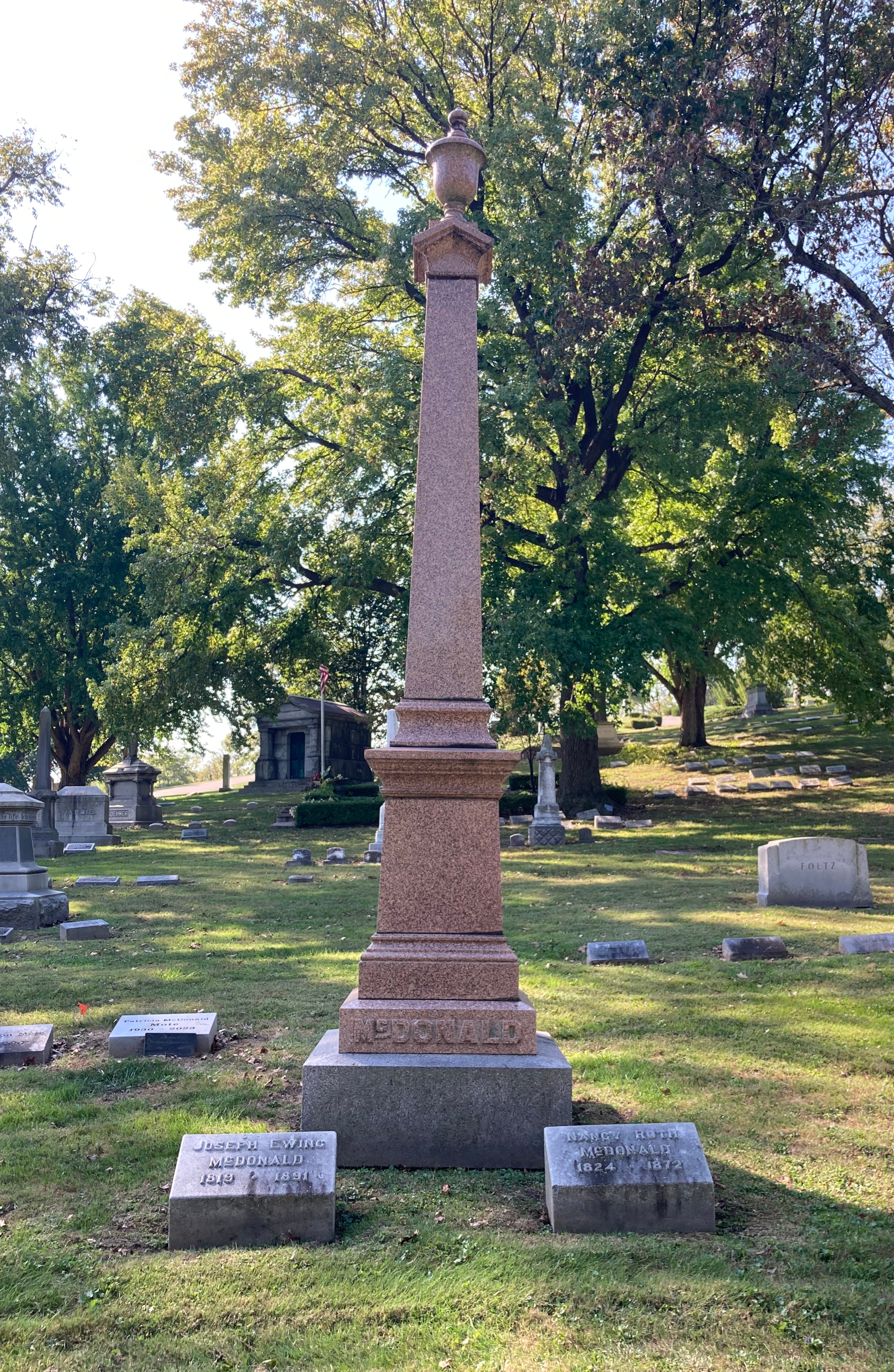
McDonald's grave at Crown Hill Cemetery

McDonald was born in Butler County, Ohio, the son of Eleanor (Piatt) and John McDonald. He moved with his mother to Montgomery County, Indiana, in 1826 and apprenticed to the saddler's trade when twelve years of age in Lafayette, Indiana. He attended Wabash College (Crawfordsville) and graduated from Indiana Asbury University (Greencastle, Indiana; now DePauw University) in 1840. Also in 1840, he worked on the Wabash and Erie Canal. He studied law in Lafayette and was admitted to the bar in 1843, after which he practiced. He was prosecuting attorney from 1843 to 1847 and in the latter year moved to Crawfordsville where he practiced law until 1859.

McDonald was elected as a Democrat to the Thirty-first Congress, serving from March 4, 1849, to March 3, 1851. He was not a candidate for renomination in 1850, and was elected Indiana Attorney General in 1856 and was reelected in 1858. In 1859, He moved to Indianapolis in 1859, where he formed a law partnership with former Indiana Supreme Court Justice Addison Roache. He was an unsuccessful candidate for Governor of Indiana in 1864, and was elected to the United States Senate and served from March 4, 1875, to March 3, 1881. He was an unsuccessful candidate for reelection. While in the Senate he was chairman of the Committee on Public Lands (Forty-sixth Congress). McDonald sought his party's nomination for U.S. President at the 1884 Democratic National Convention in Chicago, but was defeated by New York Governor Grover Cleveland.

McDonald died in Indianapolis in 1891; interment was in Crown Hill Cemetery (Section 13, Lot 13).

Political offices
| Preceded by James Morrison | Indiana Attorney General; 1856-1860 | Succeeded by James G. Jones |
Party political offices
| Preceded by Thomas A. Hendricks | Democratic nominee for Governor of Indiana; 1864 | Succeeded by Thomas A. Hendricks |
U.S. House of Representatives
| Preceded by John Pettit | Member of the U.S. House of Representatives from Indiana's 8th congressional district March 4, 1849 – March 3, 1851 | Succeeded by Daniel Mace |
U.S. Senate
| Preceded by Daniel D. Pratt | U.S. senator (Class 1) from Indiana; 1875–1881; Served alongside: Oliver P. Morton, Daniel W. Voorhees | Succeeded by Benjamin Harrison |
