= Courtland C. Matson =

American attorney and politician (1841–1915)

Courtland Cushing Matson
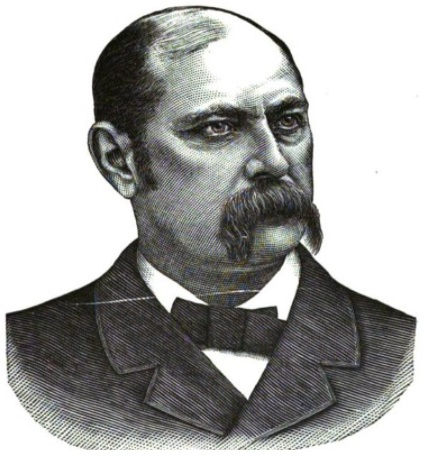
- From 1889's The National Democratic Party: Its History, Principles, Achievements, and Aims

Member of the U.S. House of Representatives
- In office March 4, 1881 – March 3, 1889

Personal details
- Born: April 25, 1841 Brookville, Indiana, U.S.
- Died: September 4, 1915 (aged 74) Chicago, Illinois, U.S.
- Resting place: Forest Hill Cemetery; Greencastle, Indiana, U.S.
- Party: Democratic
- Education: Indiana Asbury University
- Occupation: Lawyer; politician
- Military career
- Allegiance: United States
- Branch: Union Army
- Rank: Colonel
- Units: Sixteenth Regiment, Indiana Volunteers
- Conflicts: American Civil War

Courtland Cushing Matson (April 25, 1841 – September 4, 1915) was an American lawyer and Civil War veteran who served four terms as a U.S. representative from Indiana from 1881 to 1889.

== Early life ==
Courtland Cushing Matson was born on April 25, 1841, in Brookville, Indiana. Matson graduated from Indiana Asbury University (now De Pauw University) in 1862. He later studied law. He was admitted to the bar.

== Career ==
During the Civil War, Matson enlisted as a private in the Sixteenth Regiment, Indiana Volunteers. After one year's service entered the Sixth Regiment, Indiana Volunteer Cavalry (Seventy-first Volunteers), and served until October 1865, and was subsequently promoted to the rank of colonel.

After the war, Matson studied law and commenced practice in Greencastle, Indiana. He was three times elected prosecuting attorney of Putnam County, Indiana. He served as chairman of the Democratic State central committee in 1878.

=== Congress ===
Matson was elected as a Democrat to the Forty-seventh and to the three succeeding Congresses (March 4, 1881 – March 3, 1889). He served as chairman of the Committee on Invalid Pensions (Forty-eighth through Fiftieth Congresses). He was not a candidate for renomination. He was an unsuccessful Democratic candidate for Governor of Indiana in 1888.

=== Later career ===
He resumed the practice of law in Greencastle, Indiana. He served as member of the board of tax commissioners 1909–1913.

== Personal life ==
Matson died on September 4, 1915, in Chicago, Illinois. He was interred in Forest Hill Cemetery in Greencastle.

Party political offices
Preceded by Isaac P. Gray	Democratic nominee for Governor of Indiana; 1888	Succeeded by Claude Matthews
U.S. House of Representatives
Preceded by Thomas M. Browne	Member of the U.S. House of Representatives from Indiana's 5th congressional district 1881-1889	Succeeded by George W. Cooper
