= Mortimer Nye =

American politician

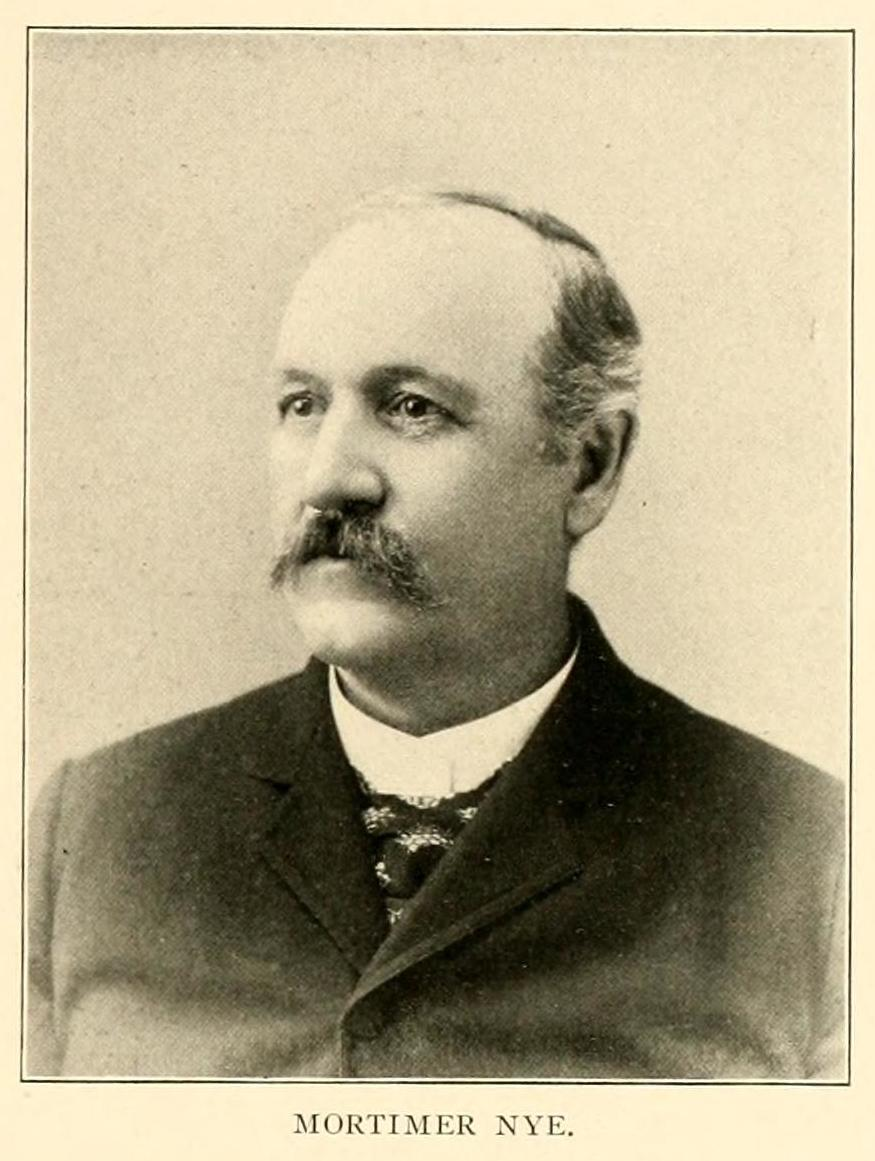

23rd Lieutenant Governor of Indiana
- In office January 9, 1893 – January 11, 1897
- Governor: Claude Matthews
- Preceded by: Francis M. Griffith
- Succeeded by: William S. Haggard

Personal details
- Born: November 12, 1838 Wadsworth, Ohio, U.S.
- Died: July 6, 1901 (aged 62) La Porte, Indiana, U.S.
- Party: Democratic

Mortimer Nye (12 November 1838 – 6 July 1901) was an American politician from the U.S. state of Indiana. Between 1893 and 1897 he served as Lieutenant Governor of Indiana.

== Life ==
Mortimer Nye was born in Wadsworth, Medina County in Ohio. In his early years he taught school. Later he studied Law and in 1862 he was admitted to the bar. He practiced law in La Porte in Indiana. For a while he was City Attorney and County Attorney for La Porte and the LaPorte County. He joined the Democratic Party. In 1873, 1875, 1883 and 1885 he was elected to the Mayor's office of LaPorte. In total he served eight years in this office. In 1884 he was Presidential Elector for Grover Cleveland. In 1892 Mortimer Nye was elected as Lieutenant Governor of Indiana. He served in this position between 9 January 1893 and 11 January 1897 when his term ended. In this function he was the deputy to Governor Claude Matthews and he presided over the Indiana Senate. On 4 July 1901 he delivered a speech. Shortly after the end of this speech he was stricken with Apoplexy. He died two days later in his Home Town LaPorte.

Political offices
Preceded by Francis M. Griffith	Lieutenant Governor of Indiana; 1893–1897	Succeeded by William S. Haggard
