= Delano E. Williamson =

Attorney General of Indiana (1864–1870)

7th Indiana Attorney General
- In office November 3, 1864 – November 3, 1870
- Governor: Oliver P. Morton, Conrad Baker
- Preceded by: Oscar B. Hord
- Succeeded by: Bayless W. Hanna

Delano Eccles Williamson (August 19, 1822 - May 2, 1903) was an American lawyer and politician who served as the seventh Indiana Attorney General from November 3, 1864, to November 3, 1870.

== Biography ==
=== Early life and education ===
Williamson was born in Florence, Kentucky to Robert and Lydia (née Madden) Williamson. Robert Williamson was a descendant of Elliott Williamson, an early Irish immigrant to the Thirteen Colonies who fought in the Revolutionary War in the Continental Army under George Washington. Lydia Madden belonged to the old Hollingsworth Quaker family who settled in Pennsylvania around the same time as William Penn.

As a child, Williamson and his family moved first to Covington (around 1830) and then to Vermillion County, Illinois (in 1833). Williamson attended the district schools of Vermilion County.

In 1841, at age 19, Williamson moved to Greencastle. He planned to attend Indiana Asbury University there. However, he ended up changing plans and moved again to Bowling Green to become deputy clerk of Clay County. He lived in Bowling Green for two years, studying law in his free time.

In 1843, Williamson returned to Greencastle and continued to study law at the firm of Eccles & Hanna. Williamson's admission to the Indiana bar was objected to, but he was ultimately admitted after a positive report from the examining committee (whose members included, at that time, future Indiana Governor Joseph A. Wright and future Utah Territory Supreme Court justice Delana R. Eckles).

=== Political career ===
In 1850, Williamson returned to Clay County to practice law there. Originally a Democrat, he was elected to represent Clay County in the Indiana House of Representatives. During his time in the House, Williamson was associated with Ashbel P. Willard (future Indiana Governor), John P. Usher (future Indiana Attorney General and Secretary of the Interior under Abraham Lincoln), and Daniel D. Pratt (future U.S. Senator from Indiana and Commissioner of Internal Revenue under Ulysses Grant). In 1853, Williamson returned again to Greencastle. There, he ran for a seat in the General Assembly but was defeated by five votes. In 1859, Williamson formed a legal partnership with a local judge.

Following the outbreak of the Civil War, Williamson become a strong supporter of the Union and joined the Republican Party, abandoning his support for Stephen Douglas and the Democratic Party. Williamson spoke at a meeting outside the courthouse in Greencastle to encourage local residents to enlist in the Union Army.

In 1864, Williamson secured the Republican nomination for Indiana Attorney General, defeating his associate Daniel D. Pratt. Williamson was then elected to the position, succeeding Oscar B. Hord. Williamson served as Attorney General for exactly six years under Governors Oliver P. Morton and Conrad Baker. In 1870, while serving as Attorney General, Williamson (along with Governor Baker and General Lew Wallace) spoke at the dedication of a monument of Civil War veterans in Greencastle. Williamson rejected a fourth nomination by his party to the position and was succeeded to the office in 1870 by Bayless W. Hanna.

In 1872, Williamson traveled across Central and Southern Indiana to campaign for the re-election of former Governor Morton to the U.S. Senate. In 1876, during the Indiana Republican Party convention in Greencastle, Williamson ran to be the party's nominee for a seat in Congress, but he failed to secure the nomination. In 1892, Williamson left the Republican Party and became a Democrat once more, opposing the GOP's fiscal and tariff policies. In 1892, Williamson returned to the practice of law, opening a firm with his son, Badger Williamson. In 1894, he was the Democratic nominee for a seat in the General Assembly to represent Putnam, Montgomery, and Clay counties, but he was defeated.

=== Personal life and death ===
In the 1880s, Williamson helped to run the short-lived Putnam County Bank in Greencastle. Williamson was also a member of the Puntam County Bar Association. Williamson was a Royal Arch Mason.

In 1842, while living in Bowling Green, Williamson married Elizabeth Elliott, daughter of the county clerk he was working under at the time. They had four children, two sons and two daughters. One of their sons, Robert E. Williamson, served in the Union Army at the Battle of Antietam. Williamson wed again in 1861 to Carrie Badger, daughter of a local priest in Greencastle. With Badger, Williamson had two more children, one son and one daughter.

Williamson died in Greencastle in 1903.

Political offices
Preceded by Oscar B. Hord	Indiana Attorney General; 1864-1870	Succeeded by Bayless W. Hanna
