= Clarence A. Buskirk =

Attorney General of Indiana (1874–1878)

10th Indiana Attorney General
- In office November 6, 1874 – November 6, 1878
- Governor: Thomas A. Hendricks, James D. Williams
- Preceded by: James C. Denny
- Succeeded by: Thomas W. Woollen

Clarence Augustus Buskirk (November 8, 1842 - 1926) was an American lawyer, politician, poet, and lecturer who served as the tenth Indiana Attorney General from November 6, 1874, to November 6, 1878. Later in his life, he became a prominent promoter of Christian Science.

== Biography ==
=== Early life and education ===
Buskirk was born in Friendship, New York to Andrew C. Buskirk (a merchant and tailor) and Diana E. (née Scott) Buskirk.

Buskirk was a student at Friendship Academy until he was seventeen. He taught at Friendship Academy, saving up enough money go live with his brother in Kalamazoo, Michigan. In Kalamazoo, Buskirk continued teaching and also became a potato farmer. In 1861, he entered the University of Michigan Law School in Ann Arbor. Buskirk read law at the office of Balch & Smiley in Kalamzaoo and was admitted to the bar in 1865. He moved to Princeton, Indiana in 1866.

=== Political career ===
Buskirk, a Democrat, was elected to the Indiana General Assembly in 1872 to represent Gibson County.

In 1874, Buskirk was elected Indiana Attorney General, succeeding James C. Denny. He was re-elected to the position in 1876. He served in the administrations of Democratic Governors Thomas A. Hendricks and James D. Williams. He was succeeded to the office in 1878 by Thomas W. Woollen.

=== Personal life and death ===
Buskirk married Amelia Fisher in 1867, shortly after moving to Princeton. They had three daughters; Ella, Zeila, and Agnes. Ella Buskirk was incapacitated by illness for many years. Clarence and Amelia took her to several sanitariums, mineral springs, and physicians in both the U.S. and Europe, but she remained uncured. Ella finally regained her health after her parents took her to a practitioner of Christian Science in Chicago. Clarence Buskirk began to study Christian Science and became a firm believer and supporter of the Church of Christ, Scientist.

In 1901, Buskirk was appointed to the Indiana state government's Committee on Publication. He used his position on the committee to respond to claims made about Christian Science in various Indiana newspapers that he thought were incorrect or inaccurate. Buskirk became a defender of the constitutional rights of Hoosier Christian Scientists, opposing a bill passed by the General Assembly that outlawed healing practices by anyone without a license from the State Medical Board. Buskirk began to publish articles in the Christian Science Sentinel. In June 1903, Buskirk went to The First Church of Christ, Scientist in Boston and traveled to Concord, New Hampshire to meet Mary Baker Eddy, the founder of Christian Science. He became a traveling lecturer, giving speeches promoting Christian Science not just in several U.S. states, but also abroad in the United Kingdom, Germany, and France. He retired from lecturing in 1915, but continued to promote and support Christian Science until his death.

Buskirk was also a "widely-published" poet. He wrote various poems about Christian Science following his conversion and had these poems published in Christian Science publications. His poem, "The Dedication to Divine Love", was read by Mary Baker Eddy, who wrote him a letter upon reading it.

Buskirk moved to St. Louis, Missouri sometime before June 1908.

Buskirk died in 1926.

Political offices
Preceded by James C. Denny	Indiana Attorney General; 1874-1878	Succeeded by Thomas W. Woollen
