= 1876 Indiana gubernatorial election =

- October 10, 1876
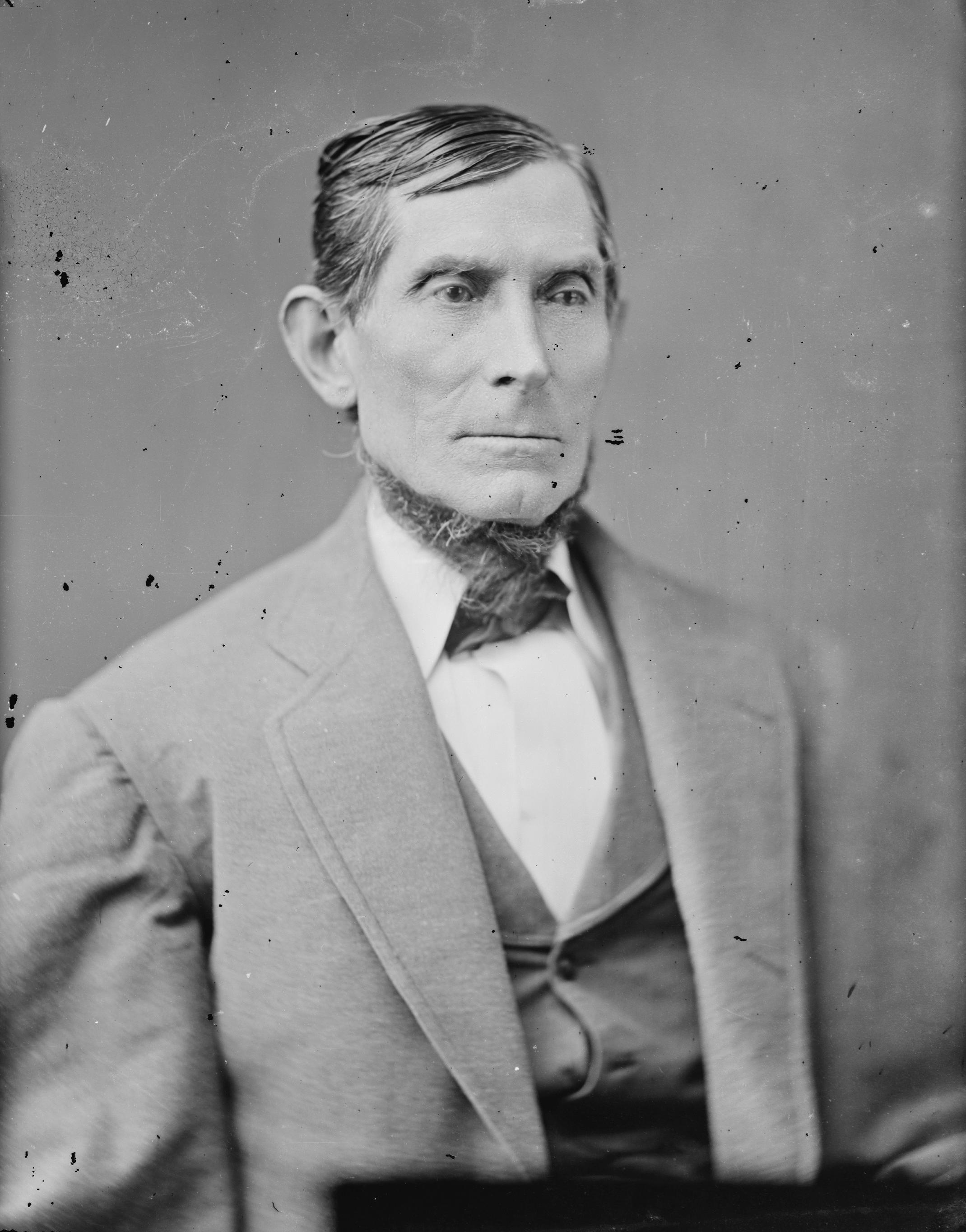

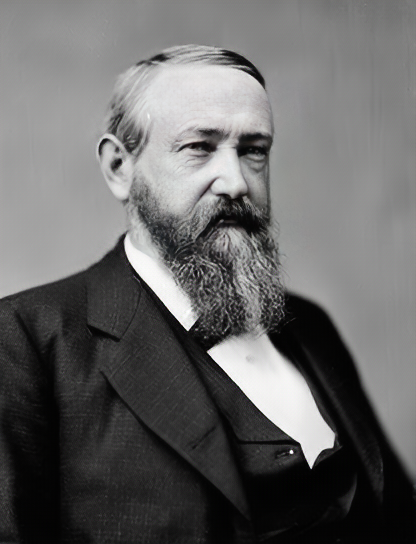
Nominee	James D. Williams	Benjamin Harrison
Party	Democratic	Republican
Popular vote	213,164	208,080
Percentage	49.06%	47.89%
- County results Williams: 40–50% 50–60% 60–70% 70–80% Harrison: 40–50% 50–60% 60–70%
Governor before election
Thomas A. Hendricks
Democratic
Elected Governor
James D. Williams
Democratic

The 1876 Indiana gubernatorial election was held on October 10, 1876. Democratic nominee James D. Williams defeated Republican nominee Benjamin Harrison with 49.06% of the vote. Harrison was later elected president in 1888.

== Republican nomination ==
=== Candidates ===
- James C. Denny, former Attorney General
- Benjamin Harrison, lawyer and brevet brigadier general of the United States Volunteers
- Godlove S. Orth, U.S. Representative from Lafayette
- Leonidas Sexton, lieutenant governor

== General election ==
=== Candidates ===
- Henry W. Harrington, former U.S. Representative from Madison (Greenback)
- Benjamin Harrison, lawyer and brevet brigadier general of the United States Volunteers (Republican)
- James D. Williams, U.S. Representative (Democratic)

=== Results ===
1876 Indiana gubernatorial election
Party	Candidate	Votes	%	±%
Democratic	James D. Williams	213,164	49.06%	
Republican	Benjamin Harrison	208,080	47.89%	
Greenback	Henry W. Harrington	12,710	2.93%	
Majority		5,084		
Turnout				
Democratic hold		Swing		
