= Daniel P. Baldwin =

Attorney General of Indiana (1880–1882)

12th Indiana Attorney General
- In office November 6, 1880 – November 6, 1882
- Governor: James D. Williams, Isaac P. Gray, Albert G. Porter
- Preceded by: Thomas W. Woollen
- Succeeded by: Francis T. Hord

Daniel Pratt Baldwin (c. 1837 – December 13, 1908) was an American lawyer, judge, politician, banker, writer, lecturer, and philanthropist who served as the twelfth Indiana Attorney General from November 6, 1880, to November 6, 1882.

== Biography ==
=== Early life and education ===
Baldwin was born in Madison County, New York. His family was of Welsh origin and originally settled in New England. Relatives of Daniel P. Baldwin include Simeon E. Baldwin (Governor of Connecticut) and the founders of the Baldwin Locomotive Works.

Baldwin was educated at Madison County public schools, Cazenovia Academy, Madison University (in Hamilton), and Columbia Law School (in New York City). Baldwin graduated from Columbia in 1860 and moved shortly after to Logansport, Indiana, where he became a partner at the law firm of his uncle, Daniel D. Pratt, who would later serve as a U.S. Senator from Indiana and as the Commissioner of Internal Revenue in the administration of President Ulysses Grant. Baldwin later formed a legal partnership with William Dague. In addition to his law practice, Baldwin also opened a bank and bought the controlling interest in the local newspaper, the Logansport Daily & Weekly.

=== Political and judicial career ===
Baldwin, a Republican, was elected twice as judge of the Court of Common Pleas.

In 1880, Baldwin sought the Republican nomination in a race for a seat on the Indiana Supreme Court. He failed to secure his party's nomination in that race, but he was nominated and eventually elected to be Indiana Attorney General, succeeding Thomas W. Woollen. Baldwin served for two years as Attorney General in the administrations of Governors James D. Williams (only for a brief time, however, as Williams died two weeks after Baldwin took office), Isaac P. Gray, and Albert G. Porter. Another prominent Logansport lawyer, William Wheeler Thornton, served as Deputy Attorney General under Baldwin. Baldwin was succeeded to the office by Francis T. Hord.

Due to a "misunderstanding", Baldwin refused to support the re-election campaign of Republican President Benjamin Harrison (former U.S. from Indiana) in the 1892 presidential election, instead choosing to support his Democratic challenger Grover Cleveland. Baldwin later returned to supporting the Republican Party, however.

=== Personal life and death ===
Baldwin opened a number of banks in numerous small towns in northeastern Indiana. He was accused of embezzlement of funds from a bank in Newton County. He lost much of the wealth he had accrued throughout his life in trying to sort out the accusation.

Baldwin was a prolific writer, composing many letters, newspaper articles, and speeches. He published numerous essays on topics including religion and public speaking.

Baldwin's home in Logansport, the Kendrick-Baldwin House, is listed on the National Register of Historic Places.

Baldwin was a supporter of the Chautauqua movement, an adult education movement that swept across the United States around the turn of the century. Baldwin was a close friend of the movement's founder, Bishop John H. Vincent, and had a cottage in Chautauqua, New York, where he frequently visited and delivered lectures.

Baldwin was a trustee of Wabash College in Crawfordsville. To the present day, Wabash College holds an annual "Baldwin Oratorical Contest", which was started by Baldwin because he wanted to reward the college's best public speakers. Baldwin also patronized Cazenovia Seminary. In 1877, Madison University conferred on Baldwin an honorary Doctor of Laws degree.

Baldwin married India Smith Baldwin, who died "a few years" after 1880.

Late in life, Baldwin moved to Arizona Territory, becoming a stockholder in a cattle ranch near St. Johns. Despite having gone deaf, Baldwin argued before the Arizona Territorial Supreme Court, representing Apache County in a case against the Atlantic Railway Company. When the case was later appealed to the U.S. Supreme Court, Baldwin recommended the county choose David Turpie, U.S. Senator from Indiana, to represent them.

Baldwin died in 1908.

Political offices
Preceded by Thomas W. Woollen	Indiana Attorney General; 1880–1882	Succeeded by Francis T. Hord
