= James C. Denny =

American judge and politician (1829–1887)

9th Indiana Attorney General
- In office November 3, 1872 – November 6, 1874
- Governor: Conrad Baker, Thomas A. Hendricks
- Preceded by: Bayless W. Hanna
- Succeeded by: Clarence A. Buskirk

James Cook Denny (August 8, 1829 – December 1887) was an American lawyer, judge, and politician who served as the ninth Indiana Attorney General from November 3, 1872, to November 6, 1874.

== Biography ==
=== Early life and education ===
Denny was born in Knox County, Indiana. His mother, Catherine (née Cook) Denny was from Central Tennessee. His father, William Denny (from Kentucky) served as clerk of Knox County from 1852 to 1862 and also served in the Union Army as a captain of Company E of the 51st Indiana Infantry Regiment, though he died the same month he joined the army. His younger brother, William N. Denny, who served both in the 14th Indiana Infantry Regiment and then in the 51st Regiment, attained the rank of colonel during the war and was held as a prisoner of war in Libby Prison.

James Denny grew up on the family farm. He attended various schools in Knox County before entering Vincennes University. At age twenty-one, he became a store clerk in Vincennes, a job he held for four years. Two years after becoming a store clerk, he began to read law in his free time. Denny left his job at the store after four years to become deputy Knox County Clerk. He read law for two more years while holding this office before being admitted to the bar. Denny practiced law for six years in partnership with Judge Samuel Judah until 1860. Other members of Denny and Judah's firm included William E. Niblack (future U.S. Representative from Indiana and Indiana Supreme Court Justice) and Nathaniel Usher (future U.S. Judge for the Territory of New Mexico). Denny also practiced law in partnership with George G. Reily, who later became a captain in the Union Army.

In 1861, during the Civil War, Denny joined a company of home guards organized in Vincennes. Denny was made a captain of the company.

=== Legal and political career ===
Denny served briefly as judge of the Knox County Circuit Court from August 15, 1864, to September 1 of the same year, appointed by Governor Oliver P. Morton following the death of the previous judge. Later, Denny became judge of the Knox County Court of Common Pleas under similar circumstances, appointed to the bench by Governor Conrad Baker following his predecessor's death. He held remained on the bench until he was elected Indiana Attorney General in 1872.

Denny, a Republican, served as Attorney General for two years, in the administrations of Governors Conrad Baker (a Republican) and Thomas A. Hendricks (a Democrat). He succeeded Bayless W. Hanna to the position and was succeeded to the office by Clarence A. Buskirk.

Denny moved to Indianapolis after his election and chose to remain in the city even after his term expired. Denny practiced law in Indianapolis after leaving office.

Denny ran in the 1876 gubernatorial election, seeking the nomination of the Indiana Republican Party at the party's convention in Indianapolis. Denny failed to secure nomination, with the ultimate victor being Godlove Stein Orth (Orth would later pull out of the race, allowing Benjamin Harrison to gain the Republican nomination).

During the 1876 presidential election, Denny was one of many Republican attorneys tasked by the Republican National Committee to go to Louisiana. The results of the extremely close 1876 election were disputed and led to a vicious legal battle between the two leading candidates, Republican Rutherford B. Hayes and Democrat Samuel Tilden. Hayes barely won Louisiana by a margin of around 3%.

=== Personal life and death ===
Denny sold a plot of land in Vincennes on which a Baptist church was built.

Denny married Caroline Davis, daughter of John Wesley Davis, former Speaker of the U.S. House of Representatives. Their son, Frank Lee Denny, became a colonel in the U.S. Marine Corps, serving in the Egyptian Expedition of 1882 in Alexandria, the U.S. intervention in Panama in 1885, and in the Spanish-American War.

Denny died in 1887.

Political offices
Preceded by Bayless W. Hanna	Indiana Attorney General; 1872-1874	Succeeded by Clarence A. Buskirk
