= Abram W. Hendricks =

American attorney and politician from Indiana

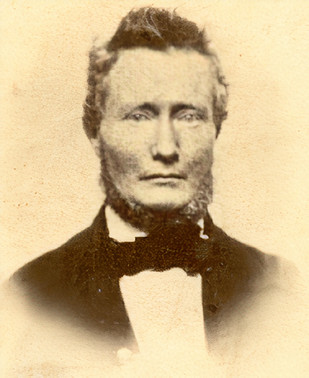

Member of the Indiana State Assembly from the Jefferson County, Indiana district
- In office 1852–1853

Personal details
- Born: October 12, 1822 Ligonier, Pennsylvania, U.S.
- Died: November 25, 1887 (aged 65) Indianapolis, Indiana, U.S.
- Resting place: Crown Hill Cemetery and Arboretum, Section 1, Lot 5
- Party: Republican
- Spouse: Sally Butler
- Relations: William Hendricks (Uncle), Thomas A. Hendricks (Cousin)
- Education: Transylvania University
- Occupation: Attorney, politician

Military service
- Allegiance: United States
- Branch/service: United States Army
- Rank: Major
- Unit: Quartermaster Department
- Battles/wars: American Civil War

Abram W. Hendricks (October 12, 1822 – January 4, 1887) was an American attorney and politician. He represented Jefferson County, Indiana, in the Indiana House of Representatives for one term and was president of the Indiana State Bar Association.

== Early life ==
Hendricks was born in Ligonier, Pennsylvania, on October 12, 1822. His father was Abram Hendricks, a contractor involved in the building of the Jeffersonville, Madison and Indianapolis Railroad. Hendricks's mother was Eliza Henderson.

== Education ==
Hendricks attended Hanover College. In 1840, he transferred from Hanover to Jefferson College in Pennsylvania. In 1843, Hendricks earned a law degree from Jefferson College. Hendricks returned to Indiana and studied law at the law office of his uncle William Hendricks. He was admitted to the bar in 1844. In 1845, Hendricks earned a degree in law from Transylvania University.

== Career ==
In 1845, Hendricks began practicing law in Rising Sun, Indiana, where here founded a law office. In January 1847, he moved to Madison, Indiana, where he operated a law office with George Sheets. That partnership did not last long. Within months Hendricks was law partner with William McKee Dunn. The partnership would continue to the end of the American Civil War.

From 1852 until 1853, he served in the Indiana House of Representatives, representing Jefferson County, Indiana. He married Sally Butler, who was from Madison, on December 2, 1856. In 1858, he unsuccessfully ran for Indiana Supreme Court.

At the start of the American Civil War, Hendricks co-organized the Jefferson County Cavalry, in which he served as captain. Eventually, the cavalry became part of the Third Indiana Cavalry. When the cavalry was called into the war, Hendricks was appointed paymaster in the Quartermaster's Department of the United States Army. He was honorably discharged with the rank lieutenant-colonel in November 1865. He returned to Madison.

In January 1866, Hendricks co-founded the law firm Hendricks, Hord, and Hendricks in Indianapolis alongside his cousin Thomas A. Hendricks and former Indiana Attorney General Oscar B. Hord. When Hendricks became governor of Indiana in 1872, Conrad Baker took his place in the firm.

He was governor and organizer of the Indianapolis Board of Trade. Hendricks served as secretary of the Committee of Safety during the Indianapolis portion of the Great Railroad Strike of 1877.

Hendricks's law firm in Indianapolis continued to operate until all the partners died, with Hendricks being the final partner to die. At the time of his death, he was president of the Indiana State Bar Association.

== Personal life ==
In 1836 or 1838, he moved to Madison, Indiana. In 1866, Hendricks moved to Indianapolis, Indiana.

Hendricks died in Indianapolis on November 25, 1887. He is buried at Crown Hill Cemetery.

== Legacy ==
Hendricks's papers are held in the collection of the Indiana State Library.
