= Bayless W. Hanna =

American politician (1830–1891)

Bayless Washington Hanna

12th United States Minister to Argentina
- In office October 15, 1885 – July 8, 1889
- President: Grover Cleveland
- Preceded by: Thomas O. Osborn
- Succeeded by: John R. G. Pitkin

Indiana Attorney General
- In office November 3, 1870 – November 3, 1872
- Governor: Conrad Baker
- Preceded by: Delano E. Williamson
- Succeeded by: James C. Denny

Personal details
- Born: March 14, 1830 Troy, Ohio
- Died: August 2, 1891 (aged 61) Crawfordsville, Indiana
- Resting place: Oak Hill Cemetery, Crawfordsville, Indiana
- Party: Democratic
- Spouse: Sarah Oakalla Hanna (nee Read)
- Children: John Telford Hanna; Read Hanna; Bayless Hanna; James Richmond Hanna; Oakalla Castleton (nee Hanna); Mary Craig Martin (nee Hanna); Ruth Hanna
- Education: Wabash College
- Profession: lawyer

Bayless W. Hanna (March 14, 1830 – August 2, 1891) was an American lawyer, politician, and diplomat who served as the Indiana Attorney General, the U.S. Minister to Iran, and the U.S. Minister to Argentina.

== Family background ==
Bayless' grandfather, James Hanna Sr., immigrated to the United States from County Monaghan, Ireland at the age of 10 in 1763 with his parents, one sister and three brothers. The Hanna family settled in Washington County, Pennsylvania but upon his father's death in 1764, James Sr. was raised by a farmer in Bucks County, Pennsylvania. On April 4, 1782, James Sr. married Hannah Bayless at Havre de Grace, Maryland. Shortly after their marriage, James Sr. and Hannah, moved to Georgetown, Kentucky. It was here that the family grew with the addition of nine children including Bayless' father, James Hanna Jr., on March 31, 1791. In 1804 the family once again moved to Dayton, Ohio.

== Early life and career ==
Bayless Washington Hanna was born in Troy, Ohio to James Hanna Jr. and Nancy Telford on March 14, 1830. Bayless had two brothers and two sisters: James, who died at a young age, Alexander, Martha and Mary. In 1836 the family moved to Crawfordsville, Indiana so that James could start a general store with his brothers, Joseph Hanna and Judge Samuel Hanna, and Robert Gregory. He later became a tanner and currier. James Hanna's move was also prompted by his desire to assist with the founding of Wabash College. Bayless spent his youth working in his father's various ventures and eventually attended Wabash College in 1849. After his Junior year, Bayless fell into some bad health and subsequently moved to Natchez, Mississippi where he discovered his love of the law under the tutelage of Josiah Winchester. (It wouldn't be until 1883 that Wabash College would give Bayless the degree of Master of Arts.) In June 1855 Bayless passed the Bar Exam and was licensed by Judge Stanhope Posey. He then returned to Indiana and went to work in the law offices of fellow Wabash attendee Joseph E. McDonald where he pursued his law studies and was later elected the prosecuting attorney of the Crawfordsville District in 1856. He held this post until November 1857 when he opened his own law firm in Terre Haute with Daniel W. Voorhees. It is because of this association and his staunch anti war stance that it is widely believed that Bayless was a member of the Knights of the Golden Circle. On October 9, 1858, Bayless married Sarah Oakalla Read the only daughter of Dr. Ezra Read and together they had 14 children, seven of whom died in infancy. Sarah Read was also the niece of Ohio Supreme Court Judge Nathaniel Read, Navy Lieutenant Commander Abner Read and University of Missouri President Daniel Read on her father's side and the niece of Commodore Jonathan Young on her mother's side. Now being a prominent member of the community Bayless was named to the Board of Trustees of Indiana University from 1859 to 1862.

== Politics ==
Bayless had now become a noteworthy member of the local community and ran for public office in 1862, winning a seat in the Indiana Legislature for the 1863 term. He followed this with a term in the Indiana Senate from 1865 to 1867 and also served as the Indiana Attorney General from 1870 to 1872. He lost his reelection bid in 1872 by less than 1,000 votes. After these years he returned to his law practice in Terre Haute but remained an important member in the state's Democratic party. In 1876 he served as the Indiana delegate to the Democratic National Convention where he chaired the Committee on Permanent Organization. During this convention he was an avid supporter of Samuel J. Tilden and was on the delegation that informed Tilden of his nomination. Being so well thought of after this he again served as the Indiana delegate in 1876, 1880, and 1884. In 1880 Bayless made a failed bid for Indiana's 8th Congressional District. He lost to fellow Wabash alum and Crawfordsville lawyer Robert B. F. Peirce having only earned 43% of the vote to Peirce's 49%. In July 1883 Bayless formed the Hanna Company in Crawfordsville, Indiana and bought the local Democratic newspaper, The Crawfordsville Review. The company took possession of the paper from fellow Wabash alum and Bayless' adopted brother John E. Hanna. While controlling the newspaper Bayless served as the papers' editor and publisher and continued to do so until 1885. In 1885 Bayless was appointed the Minister Resident to Persia by President Grover Cleveland. He was commissioned during a recess of Congress but he ultimately declined this posting, so he never proceeded to Persia. Instead Bayless was appointed to Minister Resident and Consul General of Argentina on June 17, 1885. He was joined in Argentina by his son, Read Hanna, who served as clerk to the US Legation until six months into their posting he became fluent in Spanish and from then on served as the Legation's interpreter. The title of Bayless' post was changed to Envoy Extraordinary and Minister Plenipotentiary in 1887 and he continued to serve until July 8, 1889, when he contracted some uncurable disease and was forced to return home to Crawfordsville, Indiana after a short trip around England. Various sources list his affliction as apoplexy and he continued to suffer from its effects until his death August 5, 1891. He is interred in Oak Hill Cemetery in Crawfordsville, IN next to his wife and not too far from his personal friend, Lew Wallace.

== Notes ==
Political offices
Preceded by Delano E. Williamson	Indiana Attorney General; 1870-1872	Succeeded by James C. Denny
