= Thomas W. Woollen =

Indiana attorney general (1878–1880)

11th Indiana Attorney General
- In office November 6, 1878 – November 6, 1880
- Governor: James D. Williams
- Preceded by: Clarence A. Buskirk
- Succeeded by: Daniel P. Baldwin

Thomas Wheeler Woollen (April 26, 1830 - February 12, 1898) was an American lawyer, judge, and politician who served as the eleventh Indiana Attorney General from November 6, 1878, to November 6, 1880.

== Biography ==
=== Early life and education ===
Woollen was born in Dorchester County, Maryland. The Woollen family was descended from John Woollen, a colonist who lived on the Delaware River and assisted settlers from New Haven Colony as an interpreter, being familiar with the Native languages spoken in the area. Thomas Woollen's parents were Edward and Anna (née Wheeler) Woollen. His older brother, William Wesley Woollen, was a banker, politician, and historian who wrote the book Biographical Sketches of Early Indiana. His younger brother, Levin James Woollen, became a physician and a member of the Indiana Senate.

Woollen worked on the family farm until 1845, when his family moved to Baltimore when he was fifteen. In 1848, Woollen moved to Madison, Indiana. While living in Madison, he served as deputy Jefferson County Clerk (a position he got thanks to his brother William, who had come to Jefferson County four years prior and was serving as the county treasurer). In 1856, Woollen moved to Vernon, where he read law and worked at the Jennings County Clerk's office. After his brief stay in Vernon, Woollen moved again to Franklin, where he started a law firm in partnership with Jeptha D. New (later a U.S. Representative from Indiana). Woollen also practiced law for over forty years with David Banta, a longtime judge of the Franklin County Circuit Court and the first dean of the Indiana University Maurer School of Law.

=== Political and judicial career ===
In 1862, Woollen, a Democrat, was elected to represent Johnson County in the Indiana House of Representatives. During his time in the House, he was appointed to the Committee on Benevolent Institutions by House Speaker Samuel Hamilton Buskirk. In 1868, Woollen was elected judge of the Court of Common Pleas. He held the position for two years before resigning to become the head of the First National Bank in Franklin. In 1870, Woollen began to practice law again. In 1872, Woollen was re-elected to the Indiana House of Representatives. He served on the House Judiciary Committee and became the leader of the House's Democratic minority, notably leading the opposition to an apportionment bill pushed by House Republicans.

Woollen was elected Indiana Attorney General in 1878, succeeding Clarence A. Buskirk. He served in the position for two years in the administration of James D. Williams and was succeeded by Daniel P. Baldwin.

=== Personal life and death ===
Woollen was known for his "commanding personal appearance", being over six feet tall and weighing over 200 pounds.

Woollen married twice. He married his first wife, Harriet J. Williams (daughter of a Jackson County judge) in Brownstown in 1850. They had five children; three sons and two daughters. Harriet died in 1869, and Woollen remarried in 1872 to widow Kate Pulasky (née Byfield).

Woollen died in 1898.

Political offices
Preceded by Clarence A. Buskirk	Indiana Attorney General; 1878-1880	Succeeded by Daniel P. Baldwin
