= Robert Trimble =

US Supreme Court justice from 1826 to 1828

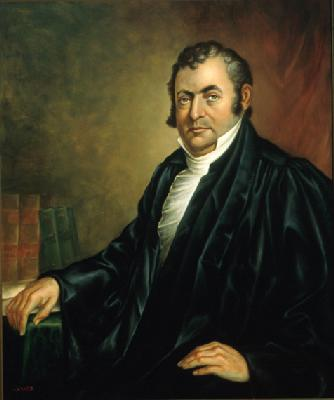

Associate Justice of the Supreme Court of the United States
- In office June 16, 1826 – August 25, 1828
- Nominated by: John Quincy Adams
- Preceded by: Thomas Todd
- Succeeded by: John McLean

Judge of the United States District Court for the District of Kentucky
- In office January 31, 1817 – May 9, 1826
- Nominated by: James Madison
- Preceded by: Harry Innes
- Succeeded by: John Boyle

Personal details
- Born: Robert Trimble; November 17, 1776 Berkeley County, Virginia (Note: The county in which Trimble was born is not known for certain as some authorities name Berkeley County, Virginia while others identify Augusta County, Virginia.)
- Died: August 25, 1828 (aged 51) Paris, Kentucky
- Resting place: Paris Cemetery, Paris, Kentucky
- Spouse: Nancy P. Timberlake (m. 1803)
- Children: 10+
- Relatives: James G. Jones (grandson); Robert Morgan Evans (brother-in-law); Garrett Davis (son-in-law); Joshua Barker Flint (son-in-law); William Pitt Trimble (great-nephew)
- Education: read law
- Occupation: Lawyer
- Profession: Jurist

Robert Trimble (November 17, 1776 – August 25, 1828) was a lawyer and jurist who served as Justice of the Kentucky Court of Appeals, as United States district judge of the United States District Court for the District of Kentucky and as Associate Justice of the Supreme Court of the United States from 1826 to his death in 1828. During his brief Supreme Court tenure he authored several majority opinions, including the decision in Ogden v. Saunders, which was the only majority opinion that Chief Justice John Marshall ever dissented from during his 34 years on the Court.

== Early life and career ==
Trimble was born on November 17, 1776, in Berkeley County, Virginia to William Trimble (d. 1806) and Mary McMillan. He was three years old when his family emigrated to the Cumberland Plateau region of Virginia's Kentucky County, initially to Fort Boonesborough and then to a settlement in present-day Clark County, Kentucky.

He attended Transylvania University and read law under two attorneys, first George Nicholas and then (after Nicholas' death in 1799) James Brown. He was licensed to practice law by the Kentucky Court of Appeals in 1803 and began a law practice in Paris, Kentucky. He established his office at Eades Tavern, which also became his home.

On August 18, 1803, he married Nancy P. Timberlake; together they had at least 10 children. Their daughter Rebecca married Garrett Davis, who represented Kentucky in the U.S. House (1839–1847) and then in the U.S. Senate (1861–1872). Another of Trimble's daughters was the mother of James G. Jones, the first mayor of Evansville, Indiana and the third Indiana Attorney General.

Trimble was elected to represent Bourbon County in the Kentucky House of Representatives in 1802. A staunch Jeffersonian Republican, he served only one term, as he intensely disliked the tumult of politics. He thereafter refused election to any public office, including two nominations to the U.S. Senate.

In 1807, Trimble accepted an appointment to the Kentucky Court of Appeals, but resigned in 1809 for financial and family reasons; he later declined an appointment to become that Court's chief justice in 1810. From 1813 to 1817 he served as United States Attorney for the District of Kentucky. During this time, Trimble proved himself a tireless legal researcher and an energetic prosecutor. Trimble also owned twenty-three slaves at the time of the 1820 census.

== Federal judicial service ==
=== U.S. District Court for Kentucky ===
Trimble was nominated as District Judge for the U.S. District Court for Kentucky by President James Madison on January 28, 1817. Confirmed by the U.S. Senate on January 31, 1817, he served for nine years, until his appointment to the Supreme Court of the United States in May 1826.

=== Supreme Court ===
==== Nomination and confirmation ====
Trimble was nominated as an associate justice of the U.S. Supreme Court by President John Quincy Adams on April 11, 1826, to succeed Thomas Todd. Opposition to the nomination came from fellow Kentuckian, Senator John Rowan, whose states' rights views ran counter to positions taken by Trimble while serving on the circuit court that favored federal authority over state authority. The effort to stall the nomination failed, and Trimble was confirmed by the U.S. Senate on May 9, 1826, by a 27–5 vote.

==== Tenure ====
Trimble served on the court from June 16, 1826, until his death on August 25, 1828. During his tenure there, Trimble generally agreed with the opinions of Chief Justice John Marshall.

== Death and legacy ==
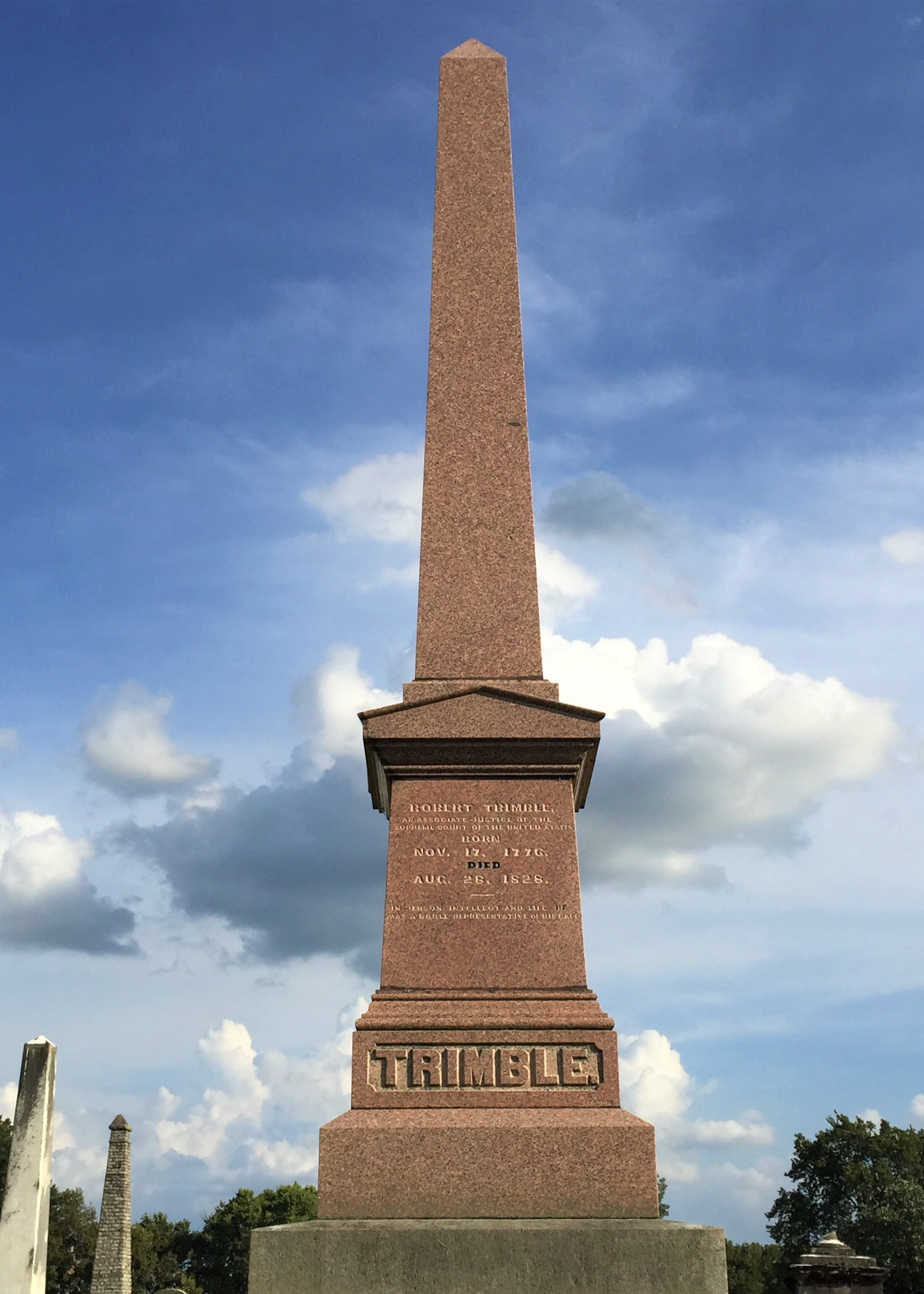
Justice Robert Trimble's grave at Paris Cemetery in Paris, Kentucky is marked by a 25-foot granite obelisk.

Following the 1828 Supreme Court term, Trimble returned home. That summer, he became ill with a bilious fever and died on August 25, at the age of 52. He was interred in Paris Cemetery. Following Trimble's death, Chief Justice Marshall wrote to Senator Henry Clay saying:

I need not say how deeply I regret the loss of Judge Trimble. He was distinguished for sound sense, uprightness of intention and legal knowledge. His superior cannot be found. I wish we may find his equal.

Justice Joseph Story, who served with Trimble, wrote:

No one was superior to Trimble in talents, in learning, in acuteness, in sagacity. All admired him for his integrity, firmness, public spirit and unconquerable industry. His judgments were remarkable for clearness, strength, vigor of reasoning and exactness of conclusion. Perhaps no man ever on the bench gained so much in so short a period of his judicial career.

Trimble County, Kentucky, established in 1837, is named for Justice Trimble. Also, the Liberty ship SS Robert Trimble, built in Brunswick, Georgia during World War II, was named in his honor.

== See also ==
- List of justices of the Supreme Court of the United States

== Notes ==
Legal offices
| Preceded by Harry Innes | Judge of the United States District Court for the District of Kentucky; 1817–1826 | Succeeded by John Boyle |
| Preceded by Thomas Todd | Associate Justice of the Supreme Court of the United States; 1826–1828 | Succeeded by John McLean |
