= James G. Jones (politician) =

American politician

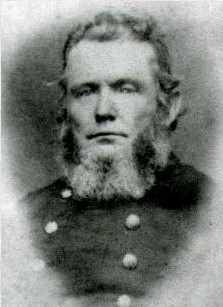

1st Mayor of Evansville, Indiana
- In office 1847–1853
- Succeeded by: John S. Hopkins

3rd Indiana Attorney General
- In office December 31, 1860 – November 1, 1861
- Governor: Abram A. Hammond, Henry S. Lane, Oliver P. Morton
- Preceded by: Joseph E. McDonald
- Succeeded by: John Palmer Usher

Personal details
- Born: July 3, 1814 Paris, Kentucky
- Died: April 5, 1872 (aged 57)
- Relations: Robert Trimble (grandfather)

James Garrard Jones (July 3, 1814 – April 5, 1872) was an American politician, lawyer, soldier, and judge who served as the first mayor of Evansville, Indiana (1847–1853), and as the third Indiana Attorney General (1860–1861).

== Biography ==
Jones was born in Paris, Kentucky, in 1814. His father was James W. Jones and his mother was the daughter of Robert Trimble, who later became a Justice of the United States Supreme Court. When James G. was very young, James W. moved the family to Princeton, Indiana Territory, where James W. ran a successful general store. In 1819, James W. moved his family to Union Township, Vanderburgh County. James W. was a prominent early resident of Evansville, working at one of the town's leading law firms, serving as the clerk of the Vanderburgh County Circuit Court and being acquainted with Evansville founder, Hugh McGary Jr. The older brother of James G., William T. T. Jones, was also a lawyer and circuit court clerk and additionally served in the Indiana General Assembly.

James G. Jones attended local subscription schools in Vanderburgh County and eventually became a lawyer like his father, becoming one of the most prominent members of the Evansville bar association. He served as the Recorder and then the Surveyor for Vanderburgh County. He was the city attorney of Evansville in 1840 and also served once as a town trustee. He became the first mayor of Evansville and was re-elected to the position, serving from 1847 to 1853. He also wrote the first charter of the city. Jones supported Whig candidate George H. Proffit in his race against Robert Dale Owen for a U.S. House seat in the 1838 elections.

Jones, a Protestant, defended Father Roman Weinzoepfel, a Catholic priest, in two widely publicized trials in Evansville. Weinzoepfel had been accused of sexually assaulting a woman while she was at church for confession. The jury could reach no verdict in the first trial, but in the second, the jury found Weinzoepfel guilty. Later, in 1845, Weinzoepfel would receive a gubernatorial pardon from James Whitcomb on the recommendation of First Lady Sarah Childress Polk.

In 1860, Jones wrote a letter to former U.S. Representative from Indiana, Richard W. Thompson, expressing his support for the creation of a "Union Party" while condemning both secessionists and abolitionists.

Also in 1860, Jones (having become a Republican) was elected Indiana Attorney General, succeeding Joseph E. McDonald. He served briefly under Governors Abram A. Hammond (a Democrat) and Henry S. Lane (a Republican) and served the bulk of his term under Oliver P. Morton (also a Republican). Jones authored a letter to Governor Morton, expressing his fears about the potentially secessionist views of southern Hoosier residents of Evansville and recommended the governor seize state arms from Evansville citizens and redistribute them among pro-Union Indiana Republicans.

In 1861, after less than a year in office, Jones resigned and was succeeded to the position by John Palmer Usher. Jones resigned to enlist in the Union Army following the outbreak of the Civil War. Jones served as a colonel of the 42nd Indiana Infantry Regiment until poor health forced him to return to Evansville. He continued his military service, however, becoming provost marshal of Indiana and heading a recruitment bureau.

After the end of the war, Jones returned to practicing law. In 1869, Governor Conrad Baker appointed Jones to be judge of the Fifteenth Circuit Court, though his failing health forced him to retire from the bench.

Jones had four daughters and two sons. Jones was the father-in-law of Eccles G. Van Riper, Democratic Mayor of Evansville in 1871 and a prisoner of war in Arkansas during the Civil War.

Jones died in 1872.

Political offices
Preceded by Joseph E. McDonald	Indiana Attorney General; 1860–1861	Succeeded by John Palmer Usher
