= Oscar B. Hord =

American politician and lawyer

6th Indiana Attorney General
- In office November 3, 1862 – November 3, 1864
- Governor: Oliver P. Morton
- Preceded by: John F. Kibbey
- Succeeded by: Delano E. Williamson

Personal details
- Born: Oscar B. Hord; August 31, 1829; Maysville, Kentucky, U.S.
- Died: January 15, 1888 (aged 58); Indianapolis, Indiana, U.S.
- Political party: Democratic
- Spouse: Mary Josephine Perkins
- Children: 1, including Henry Ewing Hord
- Occupation: Lawyer, politician

Oscar B. Hord (August 31, 1829 – January 15, 1888) was an American politician and lawyer who served as the sixth Indiana Attorney General from 1862 to 1864.

== Early life and education ==
Hord was born on August 31, 1829, in Maysville, Kentucky. He was the son of Francis Triplett Hord Sr. and Elizabeth Scott (née Moss) Hord. His father was a prominent lawyer and government surveyor of the Upper Mississippi River lands, a Kentucky Circuit Court judge, and a director of the Bank of Northern Kentucky. His mother was descended from an influential family originally from York County, Virginia.

Oscar Hord's brother, Francis T. Hord Jr., also served as Indiana Attorney General from 1882 to 1886. Hord read law at his father's office and later moved to Greensburg, Indiana, where he formed a legal partnership with Colonel James Gavin. Together, they authored the influential legal text, "Gavin & Hord's Statutes".

== Career ==
In 1852, Hord was elected prosecuting attorney of Decatur County, representing the Democratic Party. He was elected Indiana Attorney General in 1862, serving under Republican governor Oliver P. Morton. Hord retired from the position in 1864.

After leaving office, Hord returned to law practice and formed a law firm in Indianapolis with Thomas A. Hendricks (later U.S. vice president under Grover Cleveland) and Samuel E. Perkins (Justice of the Indiana Supreme Court). The firm eventually evolved into the modern law firm of Baker & Daniels. Notable figures such as Conrad Baker (Governor of Indiana) and Abram W. Hendricks (cousin of Thomas A. Hendricks) later joined the firm.

Hord was also active in national politics, serving as a delegate to the 1876 Democratic National Convention in St. Louis, Missouri and the 1884 Democratic National Convention in Chicago, Illinois.

== Personal life ==
Hord was married twice. His first marriage was to a "Miss Green" of Kentucky. After she died he married Mary Josephine Perkins, daughter of his law partner, Samuel E. Perkins. They had one son, Henry Ewing Hord (1865–1907), a graduate of Yale University who also pursued a career in law.

Hord was instrumental in organizing the construction of the Thomas A. Hendricks Monument in Indianapolis following Hendricks's death in 1885.

== Death and legacy ==
Oscar B. Hord died on January 15, 1888, in Indianapolis. He was eulogized by many prominent political figures, including Benjamin Harrison, who would later become U.S. president.

Political offices
Preceded by John F. Kibbey	Indiana Attorney General; 1862–1864	Succeeded by Delano E. Williamson
