= John F. Kibbey =

American politician

5th Indiana Attorney General
- In office March 19, 1862 – November 3, 1862
- Governor: Oliver P. Morton
- Preceded by: John Palmer Usher
- Succeeded by: Oscar B. Hord

John Franklin Kibbey (May 4, 1826 - October 10, 1900) was an American politician, lawyer, and judge who served as the fifth Indiana Attorney General from March 19, 1862, to November 3, 1862.

== Biography ==
Kibbey was born in Richmond, Indiana. His grandfather, Ephraim Kibbey, was a soldier in the Revolutionary War and the Northwest Indian War, frontiersman, and member of the 1st Ohio General Assembly who embarked from New Jersey and became an early settler of Cincinnati, Ohio. John F. Kibbey's father was John Crane Kibbey, who first settled in Wayne County in 1813, residing in the now-defunct town of Salisbury before moving to Richmond. John C. Kibbey would later move to Illinois before dying in 1861. John C. Kibbey's wife, the mother of John F., was Mary (née Espy) Kibbey.

Kibbey obtained a rudimentary education from his father. In 1849, Kibbey began attending Miami University in Oxford, Ohio. Kibbey remained at Miami University for three terms but never graduated.

Also in 1849, back in Wayne County, Kibbey began to read law under Oliver P. Morton. Kibbey was admitted to the bar in 1852 and began a legal partnership with Morton until 1860, when Morton was elected Lieutenant Governor of Indiana. Following Morton's departure, Kibbey continued to practice law, partnering with George Holland. While practicing law with Morton, Kibbey also served as surveyor of Wayne County, serving two terms until 1856. Kibbey was a Republican.

Following the resignation of Attorney General John Palmer Usher in 1862, Oliver P. Morton (who was now serving as Governor) appointed his old student and friend Kibbey to be the new Attorney General. During his time in the position, Kibbey traveled to New York to launch an investigation against D.C. Stover, a member of the Indiana state government who had illegally forged stock certificates for his own gain. Kibbey served as Attorney General for less than a year before resigning. He was succeeded by Oscar B. Hord.

In 1863, during the Civil War, Kibbey was appointed military commander of the congressional district where he lived, tasked with finding volunteers to fight in the Union Army. Kibbey obtained the title of colonel.

In 1865, Kibbey was appointed judge of the Wayne County Common Pleas Court. He was re-elected to the bench and served in the position until 1873, when the court was abolished. From 1873 to 1885, Kibbey served as judge of the Wayne County Circuit Court. After retiring from the bench, Kibbey returned to his private practice, working there until two years before his death.

In both 1876 and 1882, Kibbey was nominated by Indiana Republicans as their candidate for a seat on the Indiana Supreme Court. Kibbey was defeated in both elections, however.

Following the death of Oliver P. Morton in 1877, Kibbey was a pallbearer at his funeral in Indianapolis.

In 1852, Kibbey married Caroline E. Cunningham. They had four sons and one daughter. Their eldest son, Joseph Henry Kibbey, born in Centerville, also became a lawyer and served as the sixteenth Territorial Governor of Arizona and as an Associate Justice of the Arizona Territorial Supreme Court. Joseph H. Kibbey married the daughter of John A. Burbank, the Governor of Dakota Territory, who was the brother-in-law of Governor Morton. Another of John and Caroline's sons, Frank C. Kibbey, was a clerk of the Arizona Territorial Supreme Court and a veteran of the Spanish-American War.

Kibbey was a Presbyterian.

Kibbey died in Richmond in 1900.

Political offices
Preceded by John Palmer Usher	Indiana Attorney General; 1862-1862	Succeeded by Oscar B. Hord
