= Daniel D. Pratt =

American politician (1813–1877)

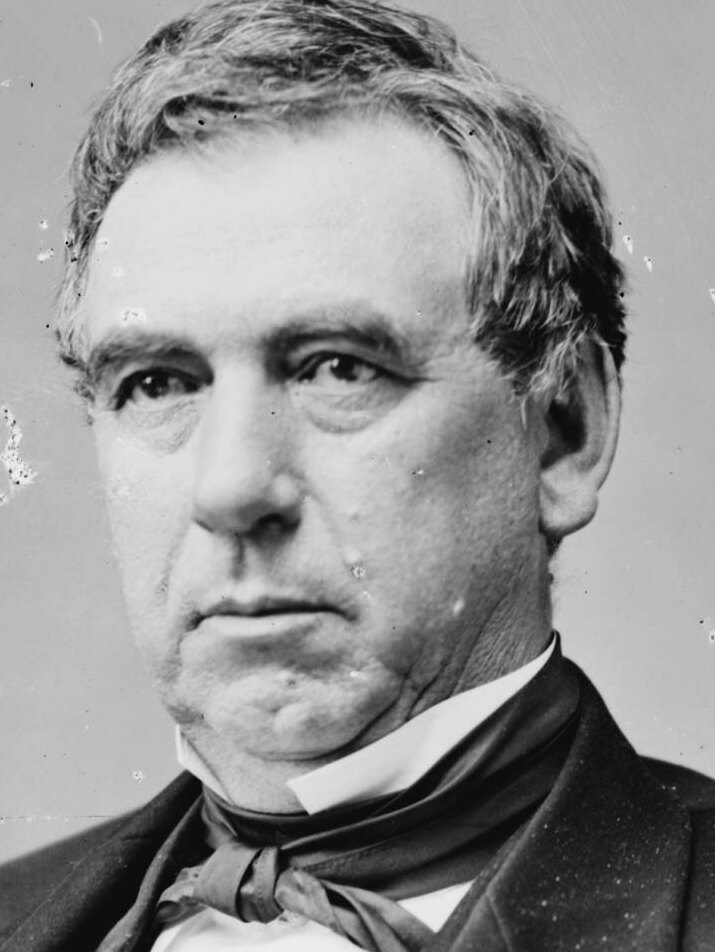

8th Commissioner of Internal Revenue
- In office May 15, 1875 – August 1, 1876
- President: Ulysses S. Grant
- Preceded by: John Watkinson Douglass
- Succeeded by: Green Berry Raum

United States Senator from Indiana
- In office March 4, 1869 – March 3, 1875
- Preceded by: Thomas A. Hendricks
- Succeeded by: Joseph E. McDonald

Member of the Indiana House of Representatives
- In office 1851; 1853

Personal details
- Born: October 26, 1813 Palermo, Maine, US
- Died: June 17, 1877 (aged 63) Logansport, Indiana, US
- Party: Republican
- Education: Hamilton College
- Profession: Politician, Lawyer, Teacher
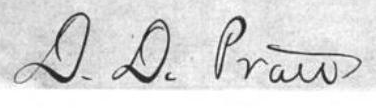
- Signature

Daniel Darwin Pratt (October 26, 1813 – June 17, 1877) was a United States senator from Indiana. Born in Palermo, Maine, he moved to New York with his parents, who settled in Fenner. He attended the public schools and Cazenovia Seminary, and graduated from Hamilton College in 1831. He moved to Indiana in 1832 and taught school; in 1834, he settled in Indianapolis and was employed in the office of the Secretary of State. He studied law and was admitted to the bar, commencing practice in Logansport in 1836.

In 1851 and 1853, he was a member of the Indiana House of Representatives and was elected in 1868 as a Republican to the Forty-first Congress, but resigned on January 27, 1869, before the beginning of his term as a U.S. representative, having been elected to the U.S. Senate at the beginning of the month. He was a member of the Senate from March 4, 1869, to March 3, 1875; while in the Senate, he was chairman of the Committee on Pensions (Forty-second and Forty-third Congresses).

Pratt was appointed by President Ulysses S. Grant as Commissioner of Internal Revenue, holding that office in 1875 and 1876. He died in Logansport in 1877; interment was in Mount Hope Cemetery.

Pratt was a member of Tipton Lodge No. 33 F.&A.M. in Logansport, Indiana. He was raised in 1837. He served as Worshipful Master of the lodge in 1844.

Pratt practiced law with his nephew, Daniel P. Baldwin, who later became Indiana Attorney General (1880–1882).

U.S. Senate
Preceded by Thomas A. Hendricks	U.S. senator (Class 1) from Indiana; March 4, 1869 – March 3, 1875; Served alongside: Oliver P. Morton	Succeeded by Joseph E. McDonald
Government offices
Preceded by John W. Douglass	Commissioner of Internal Revenue; May 15, 1875 – August 1, 1876	Succeeded by Green Berry Raum
