= John Palmer Usher =

American politician (1816–1889)

John Usher
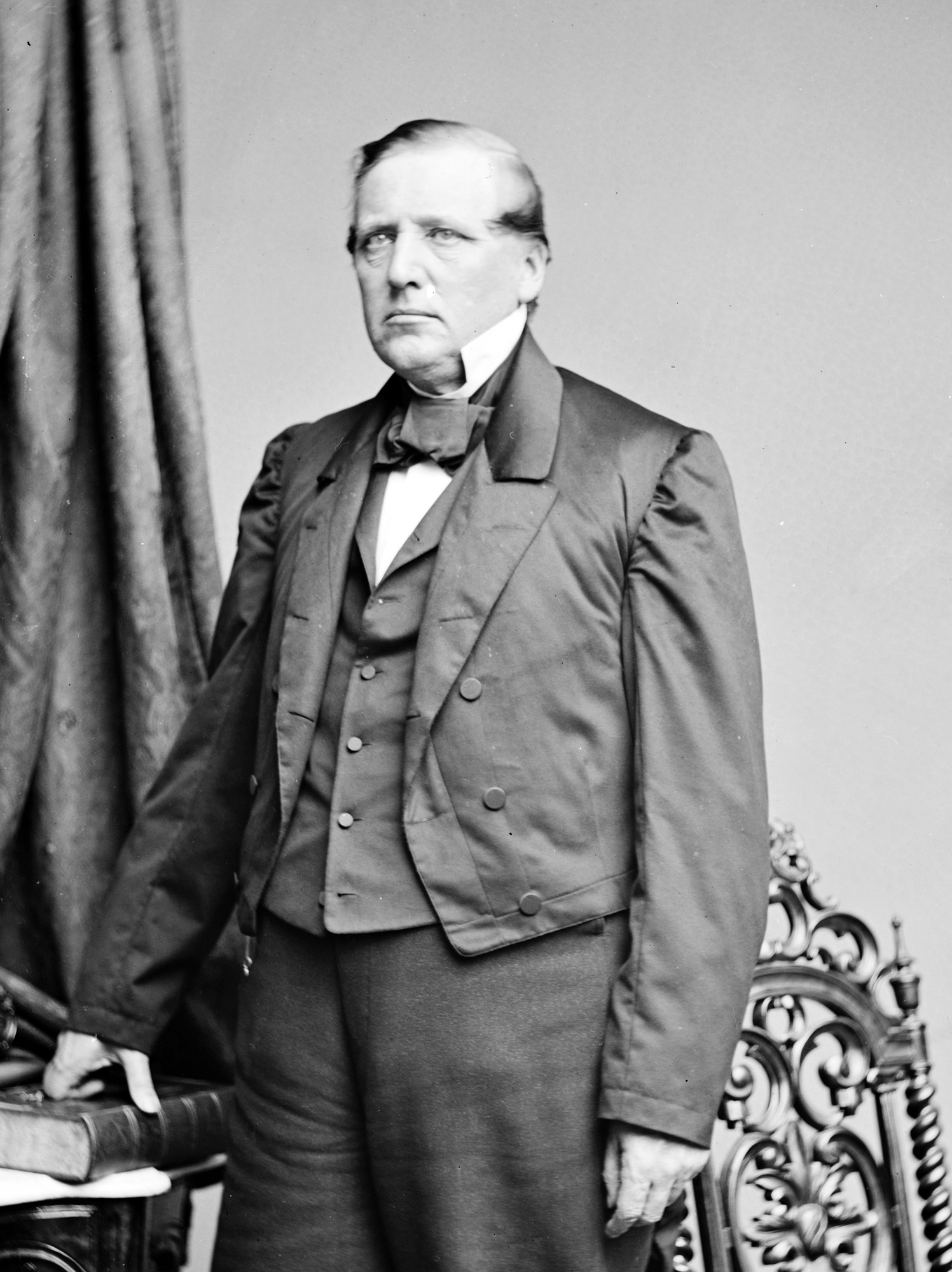

7th United States Secretary of the Interior
- In office January 1, 1863 – May 15, 1865
- President: Abraham Lincoln; Andrew Johnson
- Preceded by: Caleb Blood Smith
- Succeeded by: James Harlan

Assistant Secretary of the Interior
- In office March 1862 – January 1, 1863
- President: Abraham Lincoln

4th Attorney General of Indiana
- In office 1861 – March 1862
- Governor: Oliver P. Morton
- Preceded by: James Jones
- Succeeded by: John F. Kibbey

Member of the Indiana General Assembly
- In office 1850

Personal details
- Born: John Palmer Usher; January 9, 1816 Brookfield, New York, U.S.
- Died: April 13, 1889 (aged 73) Philadelphia, Pennsylvania, U.S.
- Party: Republican
- Spouse: Margaret Usher

John Palmer Usher (January 9, 1816 – April 13, 1889) was an American administrator who served in the Cabinet of President Abraham Lincoln, as Secretary of the Interior, during the American Civil War.

== Life and career ==
Born in Brookfield, New York, Usher trekked west in 1839 to locate in Terre Haute in western Indiana where he became a law partner with William D. Griswold in the firm of Griswold & Usher. An outstanding trial lawyer, Usher traveled the circuit in Indiana and Illinois during the 1840s and 1850s, becoming acquainted with Abraham Lincoln of Springfield, Illinois. He also became a mentor to young Joseph Gurney Cannon.

In 1850, Usher was elected to serve in the Indiana General Assembly. After the resignation of James G. Jones, Governor Oliver P. Morton appointed Usher to the office of Indiana Attorney General. While Usher was serving as Attorney General in March 1862, Lincoln asked him to serve as Assistant Secretary of the Interior. Then-secretary Caleb Blood Smith had little interest in the job, and, with declining health, soon delegated most of his responsibilities to Usher. When Smith resigned in December 1862, Usher became Secretary effective January 1, 1863.

Usher served as the Secretary of the Interior between 1863 and 1865. He was known as genial, courteous, and unobtrusive secretary. He accompanied Lincoln to Gettysburg, Pennsylvania, in November 1863 for the dedication of the Gettysburg National Cemetery and sat on the platform with other dignitaries when Lincoln gave the Gettysburg Address.

When William P. Fessenden resigned as Secretary of the Treasury in March 1865, Lincoln nominated Hugh McCulloch from Indiana to replace Fessenden at Treasury. Lincoln did not want two men from Indiana in his cabinet. Usher dated his resignation March 8, 1865 with an effective date of May 15. His resignation was accepted by Lincoln on March 9 and Usher continued to serve until May 15, a month after Lincoln's assassination. Lincoln had nominated his close friend James Harlan to replace Usher. Harlan had been confirmed by the Senate and took over as Secretary of Interior under now President Andrew Johnson.

Usher became general solicitor for the Union Pacific Railway, Eastern Division, and was active in promoting the construction of the railroad west from Kansas City. Later called the Kansas Pacific, the road was eventually consolidated with the Union Pacific in 1880.

Usher built a house in Lawrence, Kansas, completing it in 1873. Usher served one term as mayor of Lawrence. His house still stands at 1425 Tennessee Street and is on the National Register of Historic Places. It has been the home of the Alpha Nu chapter of Beta Theta Pi fraternity at the University of Kansas since 1912.

Usher died of cancer on April 13, 1889, in Philadelphia at the age of 73. He is buried in Oak Hill Cemetery in Lawrence.

== Portrayal ==
Usher is portrayed by Dakin Matthews in Steven Spielberg's Lincoln.

== See also ==
- List of mayors of Lawrence, Kansas

Political offices
Preceded by James Jones	Attorney General of Indiana; 1861–1862	Succeeded by John F. Kibbey
Preceded by Caleb Blood Smith	United States Secretary of the Interior; 1863–1865	Succeeded by James Harlan
