= David Turpie =

American politician

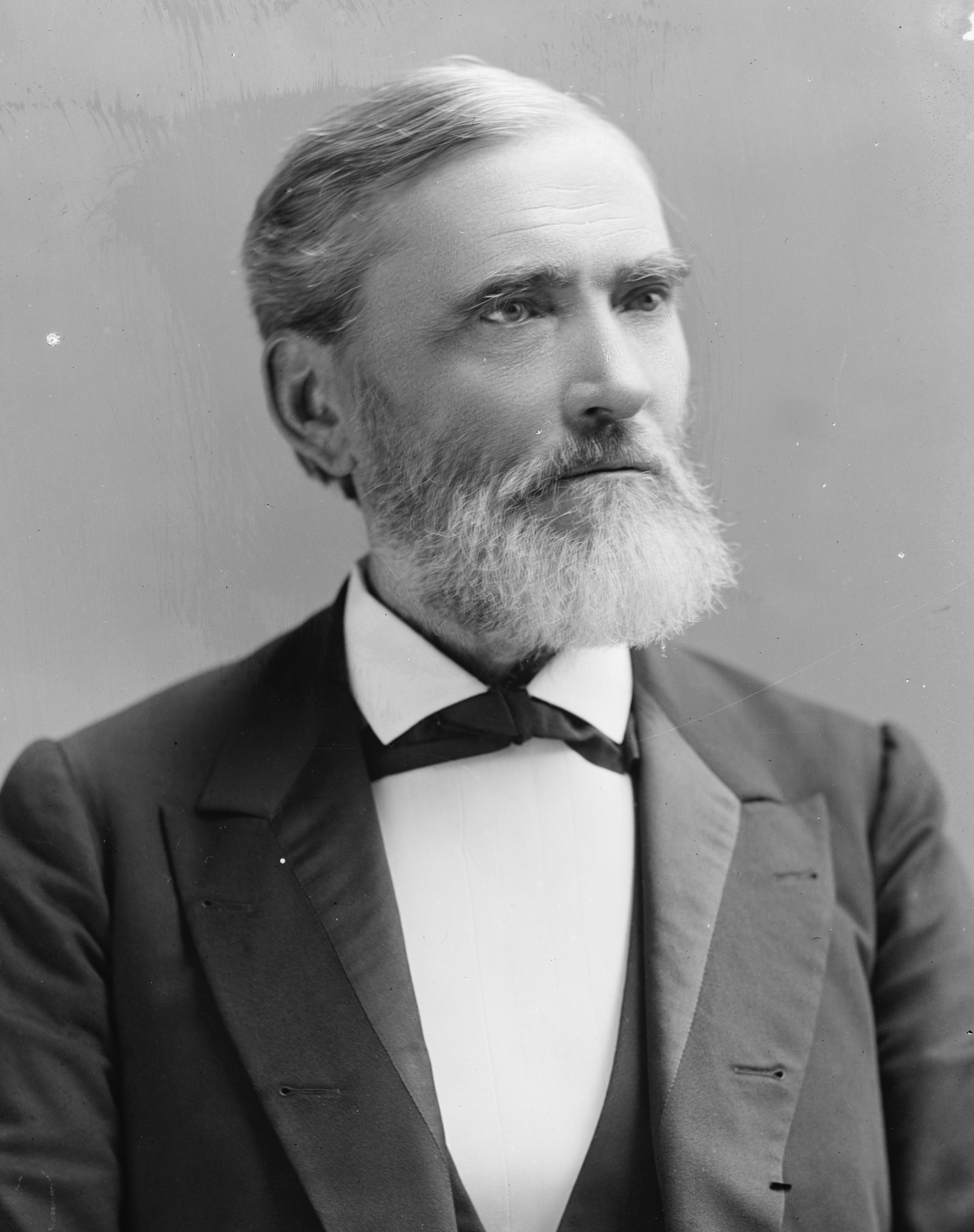
- Turpie, between January 1891 and January 1894

Chairman of the Senate Democratic Caucus
- In office April 1898 – 1899
- Preceded by: Arthur P. Gorman
- Succeeded by: James K. Jones

United States Senator from Indiana
- In office January 14, 1863 – March 3, 1863
- Preceded by: Joseph A. Wright
- Succeeded by: Thomas A. Hendricks
- In office March 4, 1887 – March 3, 1899
- Preceded by: Benjamin Harrison
- Succeeded by: Albert J. Beveridge

Personal details
- Born: David Battle Turpie; July 8, 1828 Hamilton County, Ohio, U.S.
- Died: April 21, 1909 (aged 80) Indianapolis, Indiana, U.S.
- Resting place: Crown Hill Cemetery and Arboretum, Section 25, Lot 164; 39.8184347°N 86.1705364°W
- Party: Democratic
- Education: Kenyon College (BA)

David Battle Turpie (July 8, 1828 – April 21, 1909) was an American politician who served as a senator from Indiana from 1887 until 1899; he also served as Chairman of the Senate Democratic Caucus from 1898 to 1899 during the last year of his tenure in the Senate.

== Biography ==
Turpie was born in Hamilton County, Ohio, the son of John Turpie and Mary Biddle Turpie. Mary was a native of Scotland. He grew up in Ohio and graduated from Kenyon College in 1848. He studied law and moved to Logansport, Indiana, where he set up a law practice. He soon became active in the United States Democratic Party to which he would belong for the rest of his life.

Turpie was elected to the state legislature at the age of 24 in 1852. He served one term and then returned to practicing law. In 1854 he became a common pleas judge and in 1856 he became a state circuit court judge. In 1858 he was elected to the state legislature again for one year.

He was the Democratic candidate for the U.S. House seat held by Schuyler Colfax in 1862, losing only narrowly. Shortly thereafter, Turpie was elected to the United States Senate from Indiana to fill the unexpired term of Jesse D. Bright who had been expelled for alleged disloyalty. He served for just under two months, until the regularly elected senator, Thomas A. Hendricks, arrived to take his seat.

Turpie moved to Indianapolis, Indiana, in 1872. He was again elected to the state legislature and served as speaker of the Assembly from 1874 to 1875. He served as the United States District Attorney for Indiana from 1886 to 1887.

In 1887, Turpie was again elected to the United States Senate from Indiana, this time for a full term. He defeated Benjamin Harrison who would soon become the President of the United States. His return to the U.S. Senate, after 24 years and 1 day out of office, marks the third longest gap in service to the chamber in history. Turpie was reelected in 1893 and served in the Senate for 12 years, from 1887 to 1899. As a senator, he served as chairman of the Committee on the Census from 1893 to 1895, chairman of the Democratic Conference from 1898 to 1899, and supported a plebiscite on annexation for the people of Hawaii rather than forced annexation. Turpie was defeated for reelection by Albert J. Beveridge. He retired from public life and died in Indianapolis.

Journalist and historian Claude G. Bowers, while acknowledging Turpie's reputation as a scholarly speaker of "classic English" and a scrupulous upholder of senatorial decorum, also recorded an anecdote reflecting the dry mischief of which Turpie was capable:

[W]hen Henry Cabot Lodge entered the Senate a bit pretentiously and his colleagues thought a bit of hazing might cut him down to size, Turpie, a master of satire, had been assigned the task, because he could do it so beautifully.

== Sources ==
- United States Congress. "David Turpie (id: T000432)". Biographical Directory of the United States Congress.

U.S. Senate
| Preceded by Joseph A. Wright | U.S. Senator (Class 1) from Indiana; 1863; Served alongside: Henry S. Lane | Succeeded by Thomas A. Hendricks |
| Preceded by Benjamin Harrison | U.S. Senator (Class 1) from Indiana; 1887–1899; Served alongside: Daniel W. Voorhees, Charles W. Fairbanks | Succeeded by Albert J. Beveridge |
| Preceded by Eugene Hale | Chair of the Senate Census Committee; 1893–1895 | Succeeded by William E. Chandler |
Party political offices
| Preceded by Arthur P. Gorman | Chair of the Senate Democratic Caucus; 1898–1899 | Succeeded by James K. Jones |
