= Thomas A. Hendricks =

Vice President of the United States in 1885

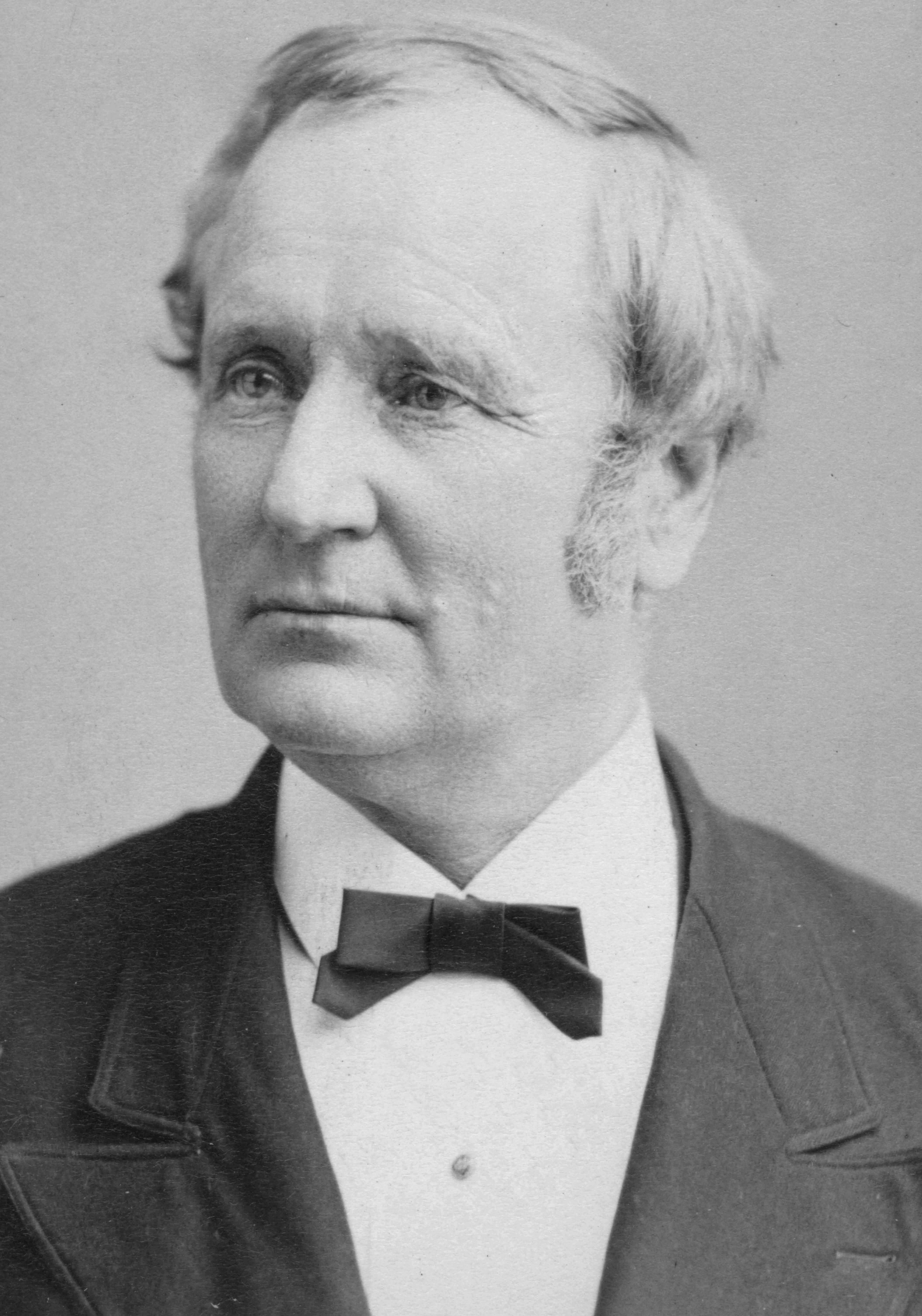
- 1875 portrait

21st Vice President of the United States
- In office March 4, 1885 – November 25, 1885
- President: Grover Cleveland
- Preceded by: Chester A. Arthur
- Succeeded by: Levi P. Morton

16th Governor of Indiana
- In office January 13, 1873 – January 8, 1877
- Lieutenant: Leonidas Sexton
- Preceded by: Conrad Baker
- Succeeded by: James D. Williams

United States Senator from Indiana
- In office March 4, 1863 – March 3, 1869
- Preceded by: David Turpie
- Succeeded by: Daniel D. Pratt

Member of the U.S. House of Representatives from Indiana
- In office March 4, 1851 – March 3, 1855
- Preceded by: William Brown
- Succeeded by: Lucien Barbour
- Constituency: 5th district (1851–1853); 6th district (1853–1855)

Personal details
- Born: Thomas Andrews Hendricks; September 7, 1819 Fultonham, Ohio, U.S.
- Died: November 25, 1885 (aged 66) Indianapolis, Indiana, U.S.
- Resting place: Crown Hill Cemetery and Arboretum, Section 29, Lot 2; 39.8171863°N 86.1712459°W
- Party: Democratic
- Spouse: Eliza Morgan
- Children: 1
- Profession: Attorney

Thomas Andrews Hendricks (September 7, 1819 – November 25, 1885) was an American politician and lawyer from Indiana who served as the 16th governor of Indiana from 1873 to 1877 and the 21st vice president of the United States from March 1885 until his death in November of that year. Hendricks represented Indiana in the U.S. House of Representatives (1851–1855) and the U.S. Senate (1863–1869). He also represented Shelby County, Indiana, in the Indiana General Assembly (1848–1850) and as a delegate to the 1851 Indiana constitutional convention. In addition, Hendricks served as commissioner of the United States General Land Office (1855–1859). Hendricks, a popular member of the Democratic Party, was a fiscal conservative. He defended the Democratic position in the U.S. Senate during the American Civil War and Reconstruction era and voted against the Thirteenth, Fourteenth, and Fifteenth Amendments to the U.S. Constitution. He also opposed Radical Reconstruction and President Andrew Johnson's removal from office following Johnson's impeachment in the U.S. House.

Born in Muskingum County, Ohio, Hendricks moved to Indiana, with his parents in 1820; the family settled in Shelby County in 1822. After leaving Hanover College without graduating, Hendricks studied law in Shelbyville, Indiana, and Chambersburg, Pennsylvania. He was admitted to the Indiana bar in 1843. Hendricks began his law practice in Shelbyville, moved to Indianapolis in 1860, and established a private law practice with Oscar B. Hord in 1862. The firm evolved into Baker & Daniels, one of the state's leading law firms. Hendricks also ran for election as Indiana's governor three times, but won only once. In 1872, on his third and final attempt, Hendricks defeated General Thomas M. Brown by a margin of 1,148 votes. His term as governor of Indiana was marked by numerous challenges, including a strong Republican majority in the Indiana General Assembly, the economic Panic of 1873, and an economic depression. One of Hendricks's lasting legacies during his tenure as governor was initiating discussions to fund construction of the present-day Indiana Statehouse, which was completed after he left office. A memorial to Hendricks was installed on the southeast corner of its grounds in 1890.

Hendricks, a lifelong Democrat, was his party's nominee for vice president as the running mate of New York governor Samuel Tilden in the controversial presidential election of 1876. Although they won the popular vote, Tilden and Hendricks lost the election by one vote in the Electoral College to the Republican Party's presidential nominee, Rutherford B. Hayes, and his vice presidential running mate, William A. Wheeler. Despite his poor health, Hendricks accepted his party's nomination for vice president in the election of 1884 as Grover Cleveland's running mate. Cleveland and Hendricks won the election, but Hendricks only served as vice president for slightly under nine months, from March 4, 1885, until his death on November 25, 1885, in Indianapolis. He is buried in Indianapolis's Crown Hill Cemetery.

== Early life and education ==
Hendricks was born on September 7, 1819, in Muskingum County, Ohio, near East Fultonham and Zanesville. He was the second of eight children born to John and Jane (Duke) Hendricks. His father was from Pennsylvania, and his mother was from Virginia.

In 1820 Hendricks moved with his parents and older brother to Madison in Jefferson County, Indiana, at the urging of Thomas's uncle, William Hendricks, a successful politician who served as a U.S. Representative, a U.S. Senator (1825–1837), and as the third governor of Indiana (1822–1825). Thomas's family first settled on a farm near his uncle's home in Madison, and moved to Shelby County, Indiana, in 1822. Hendricks's father, a successful farmer who operated a general store, became involved in politics, including appointment from President Andrew Jackson as deputy surveyor of public lands for his district. Indiana's Democratic Party leaders frequently visited the Hendricks home in Shelbyville, and from an early age Hendricks was influenced to enter politics.

Hendricks attended local schools (Shelby County Seminary and Greensburg Academy). He attended Hanover College in Hanover, Indiana, in the same class as Albert G. Porter, also a future governor of Indiana, but did not graduate. After leaving Hanover College, Hendricks read law with Judge Stephen Major in Shelbyville, and in 1843 he took an eight-month law course at a school operated by his uncle, Judge Alexander Thomson in Chambersburg, Pennsylvania. Hendricks returned to Indiana, was admitted to the bar in 1843 and established a private practice in Shelbyville.

== Marriage and family ==
Hendricks married Eliza Carol Morgan of North Bend, Ohio, on September 26, 1845, after a two-year courtship. The couple met when Eliza was visiting her married sister, Mrs. Elizabeth Morgan West, in Shelbyville. The couple's only child, a son named Morgan, was born on January 16, 1848, and died in 1851, at the age of three. Thomas and Eliza Hendricks moved to Indianapolis in 1860 and resided from 1865 to 1872 at 1526 South New Jersey Street, now known as the Bates-Hendricks House.

== Early political career ==
Hendricks remained active in the legal community and in state and national politics from the 1840s until his death in 1885.

=== Indiana legislature and constitutional convention ===
Hendricks began his political career in 1848, when he served a one-year term in the Indiana House of Representatives after defeating Martin M. Ray, the Whig candidate. Hendricks was also one of the two Shelby County delegates to the 1850–1851 Indiana constitutional convention. He served on committee that created the organization of the state's townships and counties and decided on the taxation and financial portion of the state constitution. Hendricks also debated the clauses on the powers of the different offices and argued in favor of a powerful judiciary and the abolishment of grand juries.

=== U.S. Congressman ===
Hendricks represented Indiana as a Democrat in the U.S. House of Representatives (1851–1855) in the Thirty-second and Thirty-third Congresses from March 4, 1851, to March 3, 1855. Hendricks was chairman of the U.S. Committee on Mileage (Thirty-second Congress) and served on the U.S. Committee on Invalid Pensions (Thirty-third Congress). He supported the principle of popular sovereignty and voted in favor of the Kansas–Nebraska Act of 1854, which expanded slavery into the western territories of the United States. Both positions were unpopular in Hendricks's home district in Indiana and led to defeat in his re-election bid to Congress in 1854.

=== Land office commissioner ===
In 1855 President Franklin Pierce appointed Hendricks as commissioner of the United States General Land Office in Washington, D.C. His job supervising 180 clerks and a four-year backlog of work was a demanding one, especially at a time when westward expansion meant that the government was going through one of its largest periods of land sales. During his tenure, the land office issued 400,000 land patents and settled 20,000 disputed land cases. Although Hendricks made thousands of decisions related to disputed land claims, only a few were reversed in court, but he did receive some criticism: "He was the first commissioner who apparently had no background or qualifications for the job. ... Some of the rulings and letters during Hendricks's tenure were not always correct."

Hendricks resigned as land office commissioner in 1859 and returned to Shelby County, Indiana. The cause of his departure was not recorded, but potential reasons may have been differences of opinion with President James Buchanan, Pierce's successor. Hendricks resisted Buchanan's efforts to make land office clerks patronage positions, objected to the pro-slavery policies of the Buchanan administration, and supported the homestead bill, which Buchanan opposed.

=== Candidate for Indiana governor ===
Hendricks ran for governor of Indiana three times (1860, 1868, and 1872), and succeeded only on his third attempt. He became the first Democrat to win a gubernatorial seat after the American Civil War.

In 1860 Hendricks, who ran with David Turpie as his running mate, lost to the Republican candidates, Henry S. Lane and Oliver P. Morton. Three of the four men (Lane, Morton, and Hendricks) eventually served as Indiana's governor, and all four became U.S. senators.

In 1868, his second campaign for Indiana governor, Hendricks lost to Conrad Baker, the incumbent, by 961 votes. Baker, who would later become one of Hendricks's law partners, was elected as lieutenant governor in 1864 and became governor after Morton was elected to the U.S. Senate in 1867. In the national election, Republican nominees Ulysses S. Grant and his running mate, Schuyler Colfax of Indiana, carried the state by a margin of more than 20,000 votes, suggesting that the close race for governor demonstrated Hendricks's popularity in Indiana. Following his defeat in his second gubernatorial race Hendricks retired from the U.S. Senate in March 1869 and returned to his private law practice in Indianapolis but remained connected to state and national politics.

In 1872, his third campaign to become governor of Indiana, Hendricks narrowly defeated General Thomas M. Browne, 189,424 votes to 188,276.

=== Law practice ===
In addition to his years of service in various political offices in Indiana and Washington, D.C., Hendricks maintained an active law practice, which he first established in Shelbyville in 1843 and continued after his relocation to Indianapolis. Hendricks and Oscar B. Hord established a law firm in 1862, where Hendricks practiced until the Indiana General Assembly elected him to represent Indiana in the U.S. Senate in 1863. The law practice was renamed Hendricks, Hord, and Hendricks in 1866, after Abram W. Hendricks joined the firm. In 1873 it was renamed Baker, Hord, and Hendricks, after Conrad Baker, the outgoing governor of Indiana, joined the firm and Hendricks succeeded him as governor. In 1888 the firm passed to Baker's son, who partnered with Edward Daniels, and it became known as Baker & Daniels, which grew into one of the state's leading law firms.

== High office ==
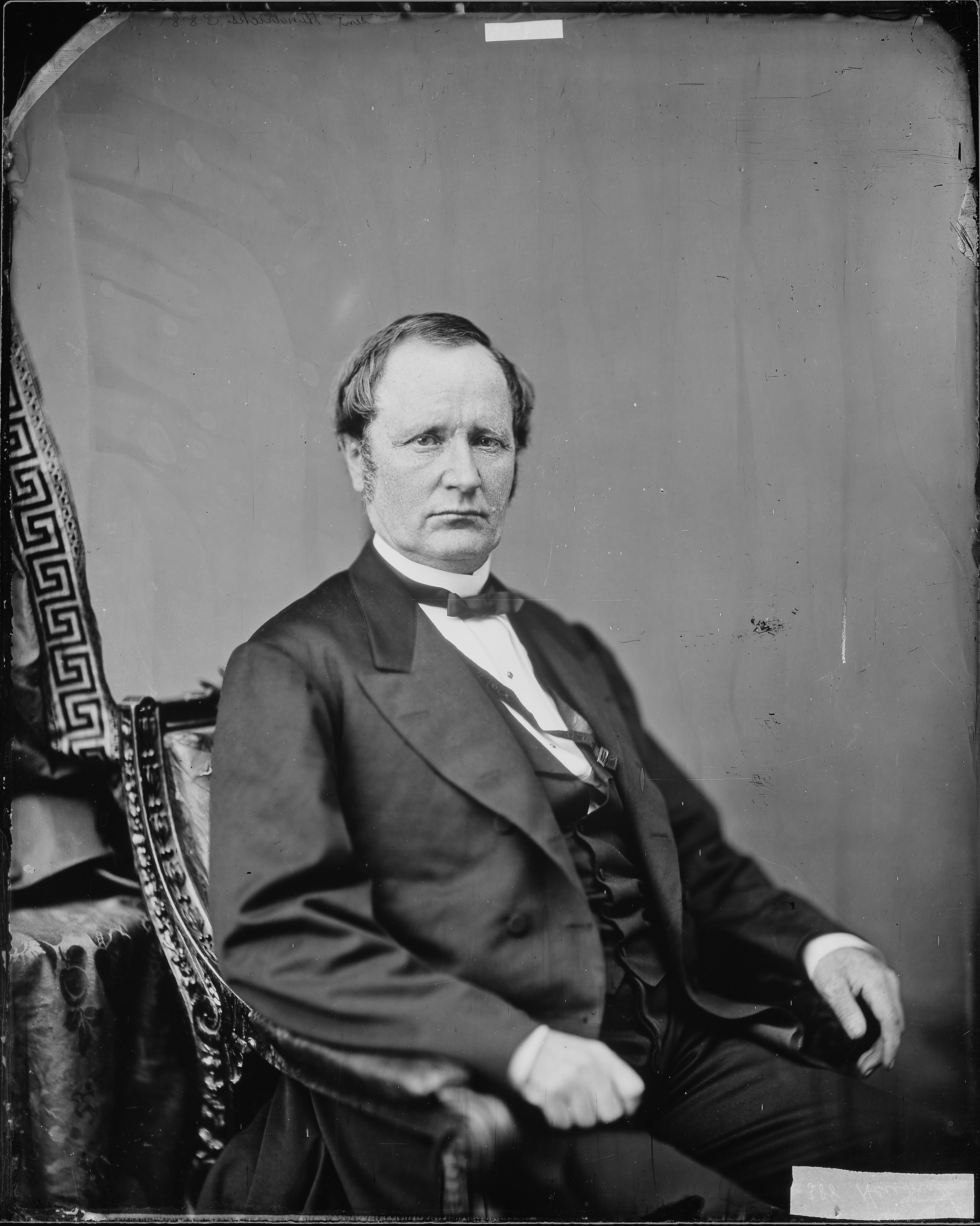
Photo of Sen. Thomas A. Hendricks (c. 1865)

=== U.S. Senator ===
Hendricks represented Indiana in the U.S. Senate from 1863 to 1869, during the final years of the American Civil War and the early years of the Reconstruction era. Military reverses in the Civil War, some unpopular decisions in the Lincoln administration, and Democratic control of the Indiana General Assembly helped Hendricks win election to the U.S. Senate. His six years in the Senate covered the Thirty-eighth, Thirty-ninth, and Fortieth Congresses, where Hendricks was a leader of the small Democratic minority and a member of the opposition who was often overruled.

Hendricks challenged what he thought was radical legislation, including the military draft and issuing greenbacks; however, he supported the Union and prosecution of the war, consistently voting in favor of wartime appropriations. Hendricks adamantly opposed Radical Reconstruction. After the war he argued that the Southern states had never been out of the Union and were therefore entitled to representation in the U.S. Congress. Hendricks also maintained that Congress had no authority over the affairs of state governments.

Hendricks voted against the Thirteenth, Fourteenth, and Fifteenth Amendments to the U.S. Constitution that would, upon ratification, grant voting rights to males of all races and abolish slavery. Hendricks felt it was not the right time, so soon after the Civil War, to make fundamental changes to the U.S. Constitution. Although Hendricks supported freedom for African Americans, stating, "He is free; now let him remain free," he unsuccessfully opposed reconstruction legislation. Hendricks did not believe in racial equality. For example, in a congressional debate with Indiana Senator Oliver P. Morton, Hendricks argued:

I am speaking of a race whose history for two thousand years has shown that it cannot elevate itself. I am speaking of a race which in its own country is now enshrouded by the darkness of heathenism, the darkest heathenism that covers land on earth. While the white man for two thousand years past has been going upward and onward, the negro race wherever found dependent upon himself has been going downward or standing still. ... What has this race ever produced? What invention has it ever produced of advantage to the world? ... This race has not been carried down into barbarism by slavery. The influence of slavery upon this race- I will not say it is the influence of slavery- but the influence of the contact of this race with the white race has been to give it all the elevation it possesses, and independent and outside of that influence it has not become elevated anywhere in its whole history. Can you tell me of any useful invention by the race, one single invention of greater importance to the world than the club with which the warrior beats to death his neighbor? Not one.

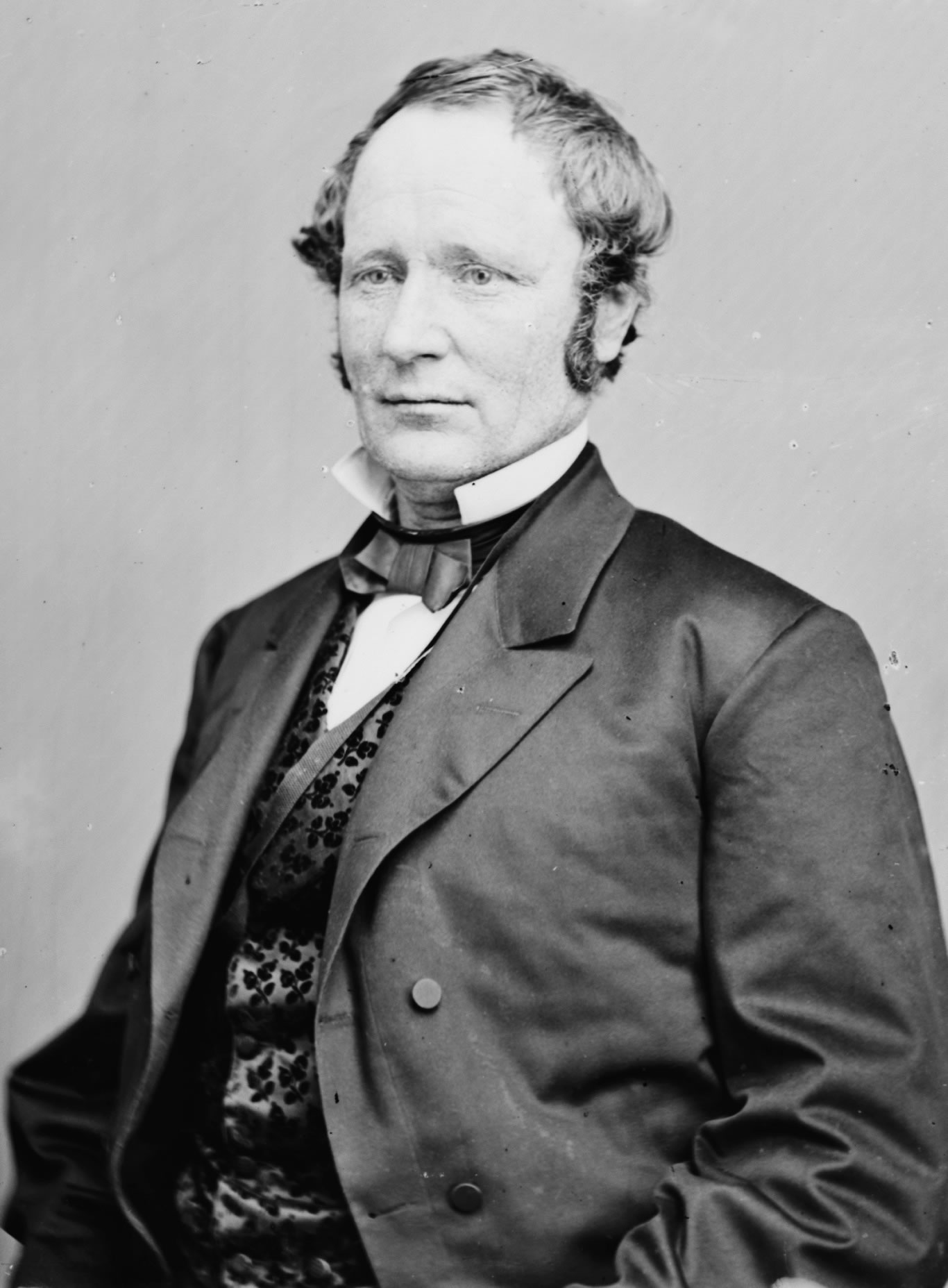
Photograph of Senator Hendricks, c. 1860–1865

Hendricks also opposed the attempt to remove President Andrew Johnson from office following his impeachment in the U.S. House of Representatives.

Hendricks's views were often misinterpreted by his political opponents in Indiana. When the Republicans regained a majority in the Indiana General Assembly in 1868, the same year Hendricks's U.S. Senate term expired, he lost reelection to a second term, and was succeeded by Republican Congressman-elect Daniel D. Pratt, who resigned the U.S. House seat to which he had been elected in 1868 in order to accept the Senate seat.

=== Governor of Indiana ===
In 1872 Hendricks was elected as the governor of Indiana in his third bid for the office. An indication of Hendricks's growing national popularity occurred during the presidential election of 1872; the Democrats nominated Horace Greeley, the Liberal Republican candidate. Greeley died soon after the election, but before the Electoral College cast its ballots; 42 of 63 Democratic electors previously pledged to Greeley voted for Hendricks.

Hendricks served as governor of Indiana from January 13, 1873, to January 8, 1877, a difficult period of post-war economic depression following the financial Panic of 1873. Indiana experienced high unemployment, business failures, labor strikes, and falling farm prices. Hendricks twice called out the state militia to end workers' strikes, one by miners in Clay County, and one by railroad workers' in Logansport.

Although Hendricks succeeded in encouraging legislation enacting election and judiciary reform, the Republican-controlled legislature prevented him from achieving many of his other legislative goals. In 1873 Hendricks signed the Baxter bill, a controversial piece of temperance legislation that established a strict form of local option, even though he personally had favored a licensing law. Hendricks signed the legislation because he thought the bill was constitutional and reflected the majority view of the Indiana General Assembly and the will of Indiana's citizens. The law proved to be unenforceable and was repealed in 1875; it was replaced by a licensing system that Hendricks had preferred.

One of Hendricks's lasting legacies during his tenure as governor began with discussion to fund construction of a new Indiana Statehouse. The existing structure, which had been in use since 1835, had become too small, forcing the growing state government to rent additional buildings around Indianapolis. Besides its size, the dilapidated capitol building was in need of major repair. The roof in the Hall of Representatives had collapsed in 1867 and public inspectors condemned the building in 1873. The cornerstone for the present-day state capital building was laid in 1880, after Hendricks left office, and he delivered the keynote speech at the ceremony. The new statehouse was completed eight years later and remains in use as Indiana's state capitol building.

=== Vice presidential nominee ===
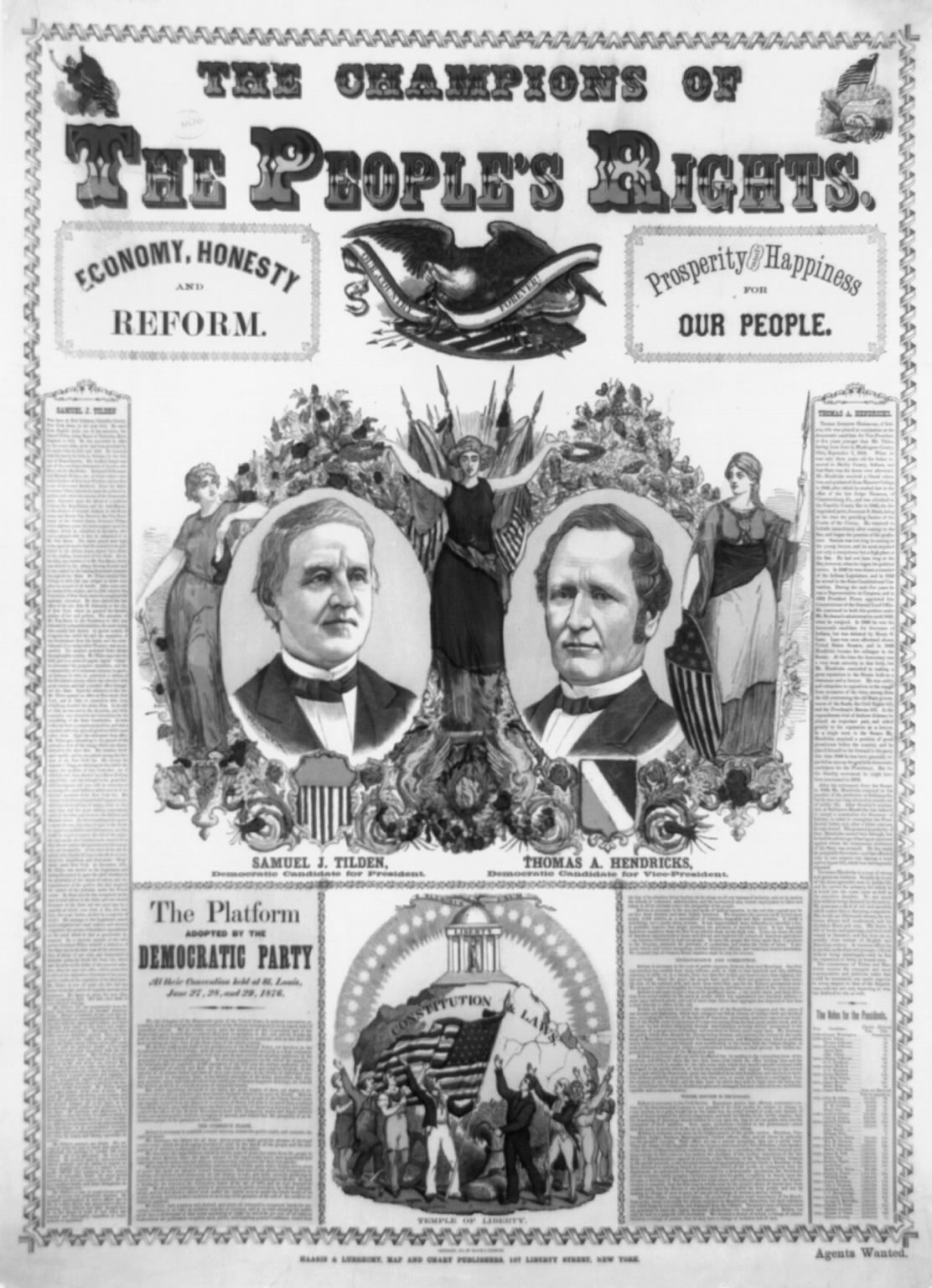
Campaign poster for the election of 1876.

Hendricks ran for vice president in 1876 and 1884; he won in 1884. The Democrats also nominated Hendricks for the vice presidency in 1880, but he declined for health reasons. In 1880, while on a visit to Hot Springs, Arkansas, Hendricks suffered a bout of paralysis, but returned to public life. No one outside of his family and doctors knew his health was failing. Two years later he was no longer able to stand.

In the disputed presidential election of 1876 Hendricks ran as the Democratic candidate for vice president with New York governor Samuel Tilden as the party's presidential nominee. Hendricks did not attend the Democratic convention in Saint Louis, but the party was pursuing the strategy of carrying the Solid South along with New York and Indiana. The Indiana delegation urged Hendricks as the vice-presidential nominee, and he was nominated unanimously.

Although they received the majority of the popular vote, Tilden and Hendricks lost the disputed election by one vote in Electoral College balloting to Rutherford B. Hayes, the Republican Party's presidential nominee, and William A. Wheeler, his vice-presidential running mate. A fifteen-member Electoral Commission that included five representatives each from the House, Senate, and U.S. Supreme Court determined the outcome of the contested electoral votes. In an 8 to 7 partisan vote, the commission awarded all twenty of the disputed votes from South Carolina, Louisiana, Florida, and Oregon to the Republican candidates. Tilden and Hendricks accepted the decision, despite deep disappointment at the outcome.

As chairman of the Indiana delegation, Hendricks attended the Democratic Party's national convention in 1884 in Chicago, where he was again nominated as its vice-presidential candidate by a unanimous vote. Grover Cleveland was the party's presidential nominee in the 1884 presidential election; once again the Democrats' strategy was to win New York, Cleveland's home state, and Hendricks's home state of Indiana, plus the electoral votes of the Solid South. Democrats narrowly won New York, Indiana, and two more Northern states plus the Solid South to secure the election.

== Vice presidency (1885) ==
Hendricks maintained a strong working relationship with President Cleveland during his brief tenure. He spoke highly of Cleveland's character and described him as "courteous and affable". Hendricks, who had been in poor health for several years, served as Cleveland's vice president during the last eight months of his life, from his inauguration on March 4 until his death on November 25, 1885. The vice presidency remained vacant after Hendricks's death until Levi P. Morton assumed office in 1889. On September 8, 1885, in Indianapolis, Hendricks made a controversial speech in support of Irish independence. Soon afterwards, Boston machine politician Martin Lomasney named the Hendricks Club after him.

=== Death and legacy ===
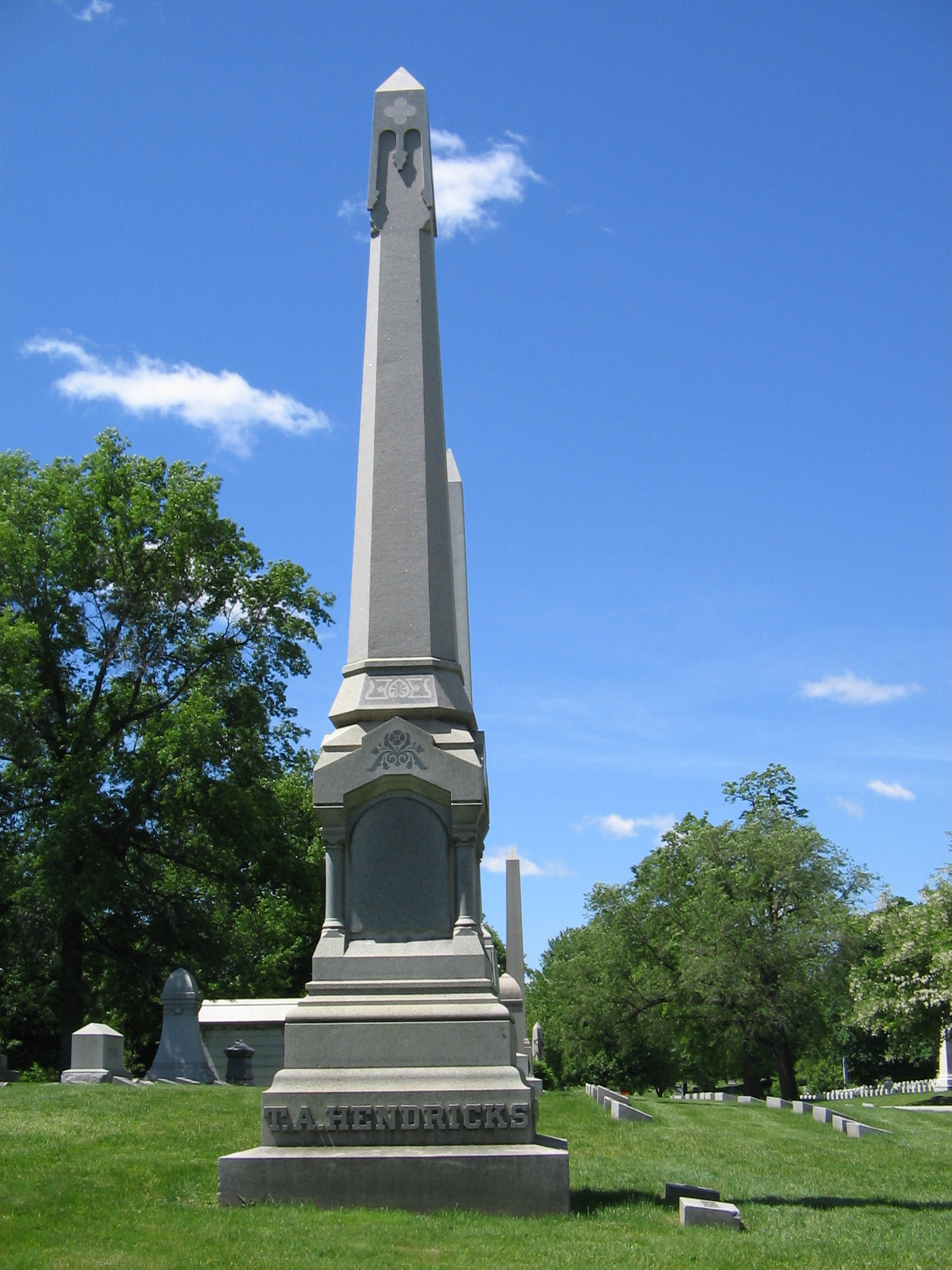
The tomb of Thomas Hendricks in Indianapolis, Indiana

Hendricks died unexpectedly of a heart attack on November 25, 1885, during a trip home to Indianapolis. He complained of feeling ill the morning of November 24, went to bed early, and died in his sleep the following day, aged 66. His reported last words were "Free at last!".

Hendricks's funeral service at Saint Paul's Episcopal Cathedral in Indianapolis was a large one. Hundreds of dignitaries were in attendance, including President Grover Cleveland, and thousands of people gathered along the city's street to see the 1.2-mile-long funeral cortege as it traveled from downtown Indianapolis to Crown Hill Cemetery, where his remains were interred.

Hendricks, a popular member of the Democratic Party, remained on good terms with both Democrats and Republicans. He was a fiscal conservative and a powerful orator who was known for his honesty and firm convictions.

Hendricks was one of four vice-presidential candidates from Indiana who were elected during the period 1868 to 1920, when Indiana's electoral votes were critical to winning a national election. (The three other men from Indiana who became U.S. vice presidents during this period were Schuyler Colfax, Charles W. Fairbanks, and Thomas R. Marshall.) Five other men from Indiana, George Washington Julian, Joseph Lane, Judge Samuel Williams, John W. Kern, and William Hayden English, lost their bids for the vice presidency during this time period.

== Honors and tributes ==
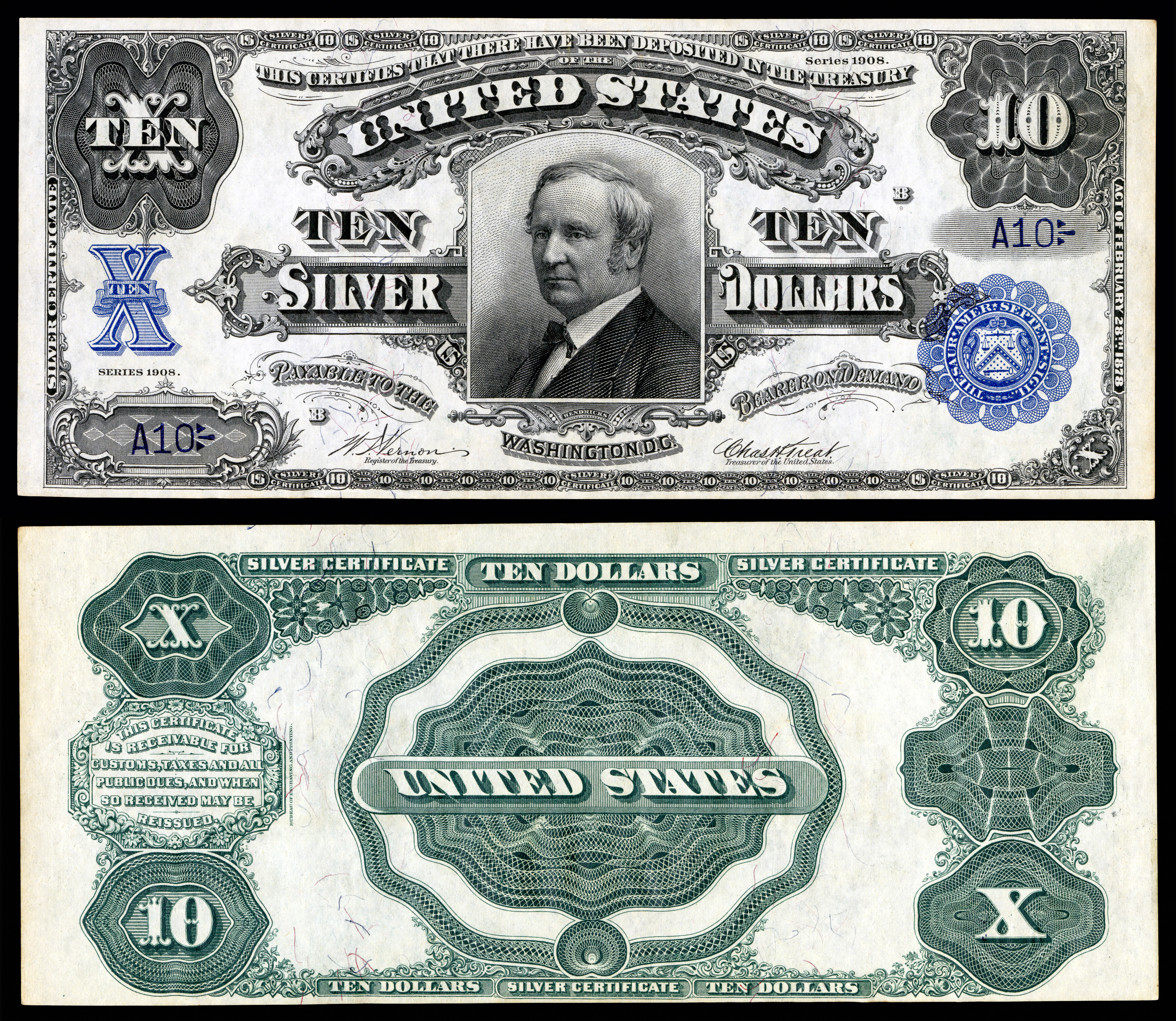
Hendricks depicted on a Series 1908 $10 silver certificate

- Hendricks remains the only vice president who did not serve as president whose portrait appears on U.S. paper currency. An engraved portrait of Hendricks appears on a $10 "tombstone" silver certificate. The currency note's nickname is derived from the tombstone-shaped border outlining Hendricks's portrait.
- The Bates-Hendricks House, where the family lived from 1865 to 1872, is located in Indianapolis at 1526 South New Jersey Street, Indianapolis. The home was added to the National Register of Historic Places on April 11, 1977.
- Thomas A. Hendricks Library (Hendricks Hall) at Hanover College, which overlooks the Ohio River near Madison, Indiana, was built in 1903. Hendricks's widow, Eliza, provided funding for the project as a tribute to her late husband, an alumnus of the college. The library was added to the National Register on February 26, 1982.
- The Thomas A. Hendricks Monument was installed on the southeast corner of the state capitol building's grounds in 1890. At 11 feet (3.4 m) it is the tallest bronze statue on the statehouse grounds.
- The community of Hendricks in Minnesota and the adjacent lake were named in his honor.

== Electoral history ==
1872 Indiana gubernatorial election
Party	Candidate	Votes	%
Democratic	Thomas A. Hendricks	189,242	50.1
Republican	Thomas M. Browne	188,276	49.9

1868 Indiana gubernatorial election
Party	Candidate	Votes	%
Republican	Conrad Baker	171,575	50.1
Democratic	Thomas A. Hendricks	170,614	49.9

1860 Indiana gubernatorial election
Party	Candidate	Votes	%
Republican	Henry S. Lane	139,675	51.8
Democratic	Thomas A. Hendricks	129,968	48.2

== See also ==
- List of governors of Indiana
- Thomas A. Hendricks Monument
- Hendricks, West Virginia, a town named after him

== Notes ==
U.S. House of Representatives
Preceded by William Brown	Member of the U.S. House of Representatives from Indiana's 5th congressional district 1851–1853	Succeeded by Samuel W. Parker
Preceded by Willis A. Gorman	Member of the U.S. House of Representatives from Indiana's 6th congressional district 1853–1855	Succeeded by Lucien Barbour
Government offices
Preceded by John Wilson	Commissioner of the General Land Office; 1855–1859	Succeeded by Samuel Axley Smith
Party political offices
Preceded by Ashbel P. Willard	Democratic nominee for Governor of Indiana; 1860	Succeeded by Joseph E. McDonald
Preceded by Joseph E. McDonald	Democratic nominee for Governor of Indiana; 1868, 1872	Succeeded by James D. Williams
Preceded by Gratz Brown	Democratic nominee for Vice President of the United States; 1876	Succeeded by William English
Preceded by William English	Democratic nominee for Vice President of the United States; 1884	Succeeded by Allen G. Thurman
U.S. Senate
Preceded by David Turpie	U.S. Senator (Class 1) from Indiana; 1863–1869; Served alongside: Henry S. Lane, Oliver P. Morton	Succeeded by Daniel D. Pratt
Political offices
Preceded by Conrad Baker	Governor of Indiana; 1873–1877	Succeeded by James D. Williams
Preceded by Chester A. Arthur	Vice President of the United States; 1885	Succeeded by Levi P. Morton
