= Indiana Attorney General =

Attorney general for the U.S. state of Indiana

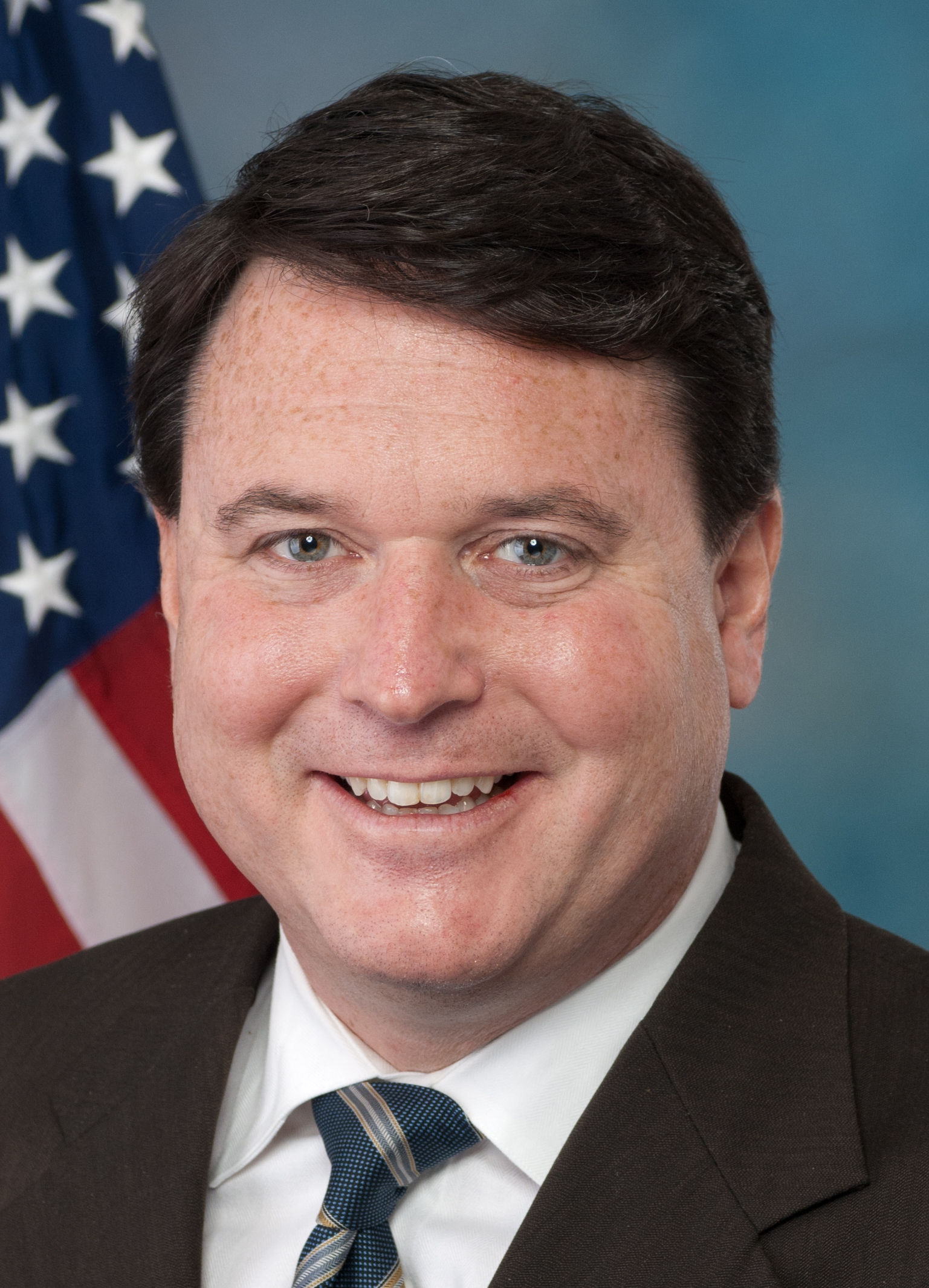
- Incumbent; Todd Rokita since January 11, 2021
- Term length: Four years
- Constituting instrument: Constitution of Indiana
- Formation: 1855
- First holder: James Morrison
- Succession: Statewide election
- Salary: $183,450
- Website: www.in.gov/attorneygeneral/

The Indiana attorney general is the chief legal officer of the State of Indiana in the United States. Attorneys General are chosen by a statewide general election to serve for a four-year term. The forty-fourth and current attorney general is Todd Rokita.

== Office of Attorney General Divisions ==
- Advisory Division - The Advisory Division provides legal advice and counsel to large state agencies and individual officials at every level of state government. The division also publishes official opinions related to significant state issues. The Advisory Division does not make or recommend policy. Rather, it guides officials in their efforts to understand specific state statutes, policies, and procedures. The Attorney General's law clients are the statewide elected officials, state legislators, state agencies, and the 92 county prosecutors.
- Appeals Division - The Appeals Division represents the state in both civil and criminal appeals, as well as in other specialized areas. Civil Appeals represents the state in appellate cases involving constitutional issues, civil rights, consumer protection, government benefits, administrative procedures, and employment matters, as well as business regulations and cases involving claims against the state. Criminal Appeals represents the state in criminal cases appealed to the Indiana Court of Appeals and Indiana Supreme Court. This means these attorneys work to uphold sentences - and keep criminals in prison. This section also represents the state's interests when prison inmates challenge their convictions in the federal court system through a habeas corpus petition.
- Complex Litigation Division - The Complex Litigation Division represents the State of Indiana in high profile and often multifaceted investigations and litigation in both state and federal courts. In furtherance of those matters, Complex Litigation works closely with other State agencies, States and office divisions to best advocate for Hoosiers. While not limited to one substantive subject matter area, Complex Litigation matters typically involve issues of unsettled law, large number of impacted individuals or damages, or issues of particular importance to the State of Indiana.
- Consumer Protection Division - The Consumer Protection Division works to protect consumers from deceptive and predatory business practices. By state law, the Attorney General's Office cannot act as an individual's private attorney or provide legal advice to citizens. However, the Attorney General's Consumer Protection Division mediates and investigates consumer complaints against businesses and other organizations and takes legal action on behalf of the state against individuals and companies that violate Indiana's Deceptive Consumer Sales Act.
- Litigation Division - The Litigation Division serves as the state's law firm and represents the State and its agencies, officials and employees in state and federal courts in complex and significant interest cases in almost every substantive area of the law - protecting the public interest by defending constitutional challenges and class actions to bringing actions to enforce state statutes and regulations to condemnation to public integrity whistleblower and fraud cases to recoup taxpayer money. The Litigation Division has four Sections - each with their own area of expertise; Administrative and Regulatory Enforcement Litigation Section, Asset Recovery and Bankruptcy Litigation Section, Government Litigation Section, and Real Estate Litigation Section.
- Medicaid Fraud Control Unit - The Medicaid Fraud Control Unit investigates fraud involving healthcare providers that intentionally defraud the state's Medicaid program through fraudulent practices. The unit also investigates allegations of prescription drug diversion, patient abuse, neglect, and exploitation in facilities receiving payments under the Medicaid program, such as nursing homes, facilities for the mentally and physically disabled, and assisted living facilities. The unit employs a professional staff of criminal investigators, auditors, attorneys and support staff who work closely with federal, state, and local partners to investigate and prosecute violations of health care laws.
- Solicitor General - The Solicitor General is the chief litigation policy advisor to the attorney general, providing comprehensive oversight of state and federal litigation for Indiana. The solicitor general also handles specific cases involving constitutional challenges, pursues cases with issues of vital interest to the state government, makes recommendations to the attorney general on the state's participation in filing amicus curiae briefs (friend of the court briefs), and consults with the Appellate Division to determine which civil cases the state should appeal and the appropriate legal position to pursue.
- Unclaimed Property Unit - Each year, millions of dollars in assets are turned over to the Indiana Attorney General's Office as unclaimed property. The Unclaimed Property Division works to help return these assets to their rightful owners. Unclaimed property is any financial asset with no activity by its owner for an extended period of time, including; dormant bank accounts, lost or forgotten uncashed checks, stocks or bonds, dividends, and bond interest, insurance proceeds, utility refunds, and safe-deposit box contents.

== List of Indiana Attorneys General ==
=== Territorial ===
Image	Attorney General	Political party	Term of service
	Benjamin Parke		1804–1808
	John Rice Jones		1808–1816

=== State ===
Under the 1816 Constitution of Indiana the office of Attorney General was filled by appointment. After the adoption of the 1851 constitution, the office was filled by popular election.

Parties

Democratic (19) Republican (25)

Image	Attorney General	Political party	Term of service
	James Morrison	Republican	1855–1856
	Joseph E. McDonald	Democratic	1856–1860
	James G. Jones	Republican	1860–1861
	John Palmer Usher	Republican	1861–1862
	John F. Kibbey	Republican	1862
	Oscar B. Hord	Democratic	1862–1864
	Delano E. Williamson	Republican	1864–1870
	Bayless W. Hanna	Democratic	1870–1872
	James C. Denny	Republican	1872–1874
	Clarence A. Buskirk	Democratic	1874–1878
	Thomas W. Woollen	Democratic	1878–1880
	Daniel P. Baldwin	Republican	1880–1882
	Francis T. Hord	Democratic	1882–1886
	Louis T. Michener	Republican	1886–1890
	Alonzo G. Smith	Democratic	1890–1894
	William A. Ketcham	Republican	1894–1898
	William L. Taylor	Republican	1898–1903
	Charles W. Miller	Republican	1903–1907
	James Bingham	Republican	1907–1911
	Thomas M. Honan	Democratic	1911–1915
	Richard M. Milburn	Democratic	1915
	Evan B. Stotsenburg	Democratic	1915–1917
	Ele Stansbury	Republican	1917–1921
	U. S. Lesh	Republican	1921–1925
	Arthur L. Gilliom	Republican	1925–1929
	James M. Ogden	Republican	1929–1933
	Philip Lutz Jr.	Democratic	1933–1937
	Omer Stokes Jackson	Democratic	1937–1940
	Samuel D. Jackson	Democratic	1940–1941
	George N. Beamer	Democratic	1941–1943
	James Emmert	Republican	1943–1947
	Cleon H. Foust	Republican	1947–1949
	J. Emmett McManamon	Democratic	1949–1953
	Edwin K. Steers	Republican	1953–1965
	John J. Dillon	Democratic	1965–1969
	Theodore L. Sendak	Republican	1969–1981
	Linley E. Pearson	Republican	1981–1993
	Pamela L. Carter	Democratic	1993–1997
	Jeffrey A. Modisett	Democratic	1997–2000
	Karen Freeman-Wilson	Democratic	2000–2001
	Steve Carter	Republican	2001–2009
	Greg Zoeller	Republican	2009–2017
	Curtis Hill	Republican	2017–2021
	Todd Rokita	Republican	2021–present
