= List of people executed in Indiana (pre-1972) =

The following is a list of people executed by the U.S. state of Indiana before capital punishment was resumed in the United States in 1976.

One hundred and thirty-one people, all male, were executed in Indiana during the pre-Furman era, seventy-two by hanging and fifty-nine by electrocution.

== List of people executed in Indiana (pre-1972) ==
=== Indiana Territory ===
No.	Name	Race	Age	Sex	Date of execution	County	Method	Victim(s)	Governor	Ref.
1	Slaughter	—	—	Male	1814	Knox	Hanging	Unknown	Thomas Posey	Ref.

=== Statehood: 1814–1972 ===
No.	Name	Race	Age	Sex	Date of execution	County	Method	Victim(s)	Governor	Ref.
1	Henry Chryst	White	—	Male	April 1, 1817	Wayne	Hanging	James Chambers	Jonathan Jennings	Ref.
2	James Ouley	White	—	Male	October 1, 1818	Crawford	Hanging	William Briley	Jonathan Jennings	
3	Amasa Fuller	White	—	Male	March 31, 1820	Dearborn	Hanging	Palmer Warren	Jonathan Jennings	
4	John Dahmen	White	—	Male	July 26, 1821	Floyd	Hanging	Frederick Nolte	Jonathan Jennings	
5	Thomas McKinney	White	—	Male	October 22, 1822	Knox	Hanging	James Boyd	Ratliff Boon	
6	Hampshire Pitts	Black	—	Male	December 6, 1822	Wayne	Hanging	William Mail	William Hendricks	
7	John Harvey	White	50	Male	June 27, 1823	Vanderburgh	Hanging	Thomas Casey	William Hendricks	
8	William Cox	Black	—	Male	April 9, 1824	Knox	Hanging	Rosannah Smith	William Hendricks	
9	James Hudson	White	—	Male	January 12, 1825	Madison	Hanging	Falls Creek massacre (Note: Nine Native Americans; John Bridge Jr. spared from death)	William Hendricks	
10	John Bridge Sr.	White	—	Male	June 3, 1825	Madison	Hanging	Falls Creek massacre	James B. Ray	
11	Stephen Sawyer	White	—	Male	June 3, 1825	Madison	Hanging	Falls Creek massacre	James B. Ray	
12	Edward Swanson	White	—	Male	May 11, 1829	Rush	Hanging	Elisha Clark	James B. Ray	
13	John Richardson	White	—	Male	November 12, 1830	Fountain	Hanging	Richardson family	James B. Ray	
14	Kader Herring	White	—	Male	June 11, 1833	Bartholomew	Hanging	John Comer	Noah Noble	
15	John Jones	White	—	Male	June 11, 1833	Bartholomew	Hanging	John Ray	Noah Noble	
16	Isaac Heller (Note: Real name Isaac Young)	White	26	Male	April 25, 1836	Union	Hanging	Heller family	Noah Noble	
17	David Scott	White	—	Male	June 15, 1838	LaPorte	Hanging	Joshua Copland	David Wallace	
18	Francis Staves	White	—	Male	June 29, 1838	Porter	Hanging	John Pelton	David Wallace	
19	John Lechner	White	—	Male	November 3, 1840	Noble	Hanging	John Farley	David Wallace	
20	William Thompson	White	—	Male	February 12, 1841	Putnam	Hanging	Abraham Rhinearson	Samuel Bigger	
21	James Sumner	White	—	Male	October 7, 1841	Jackson	Hanging	Nancy Sumner	Samuel Bigger	
22	Noah Beauchamp	White	—	Male	December 30, 1842	Parke	Hanging	George Mickleberry	Samuel Bigger	
23	Henry Dyas	White	—	Male	July 5, 1844	Vigo	Hanging	George Brock	James Whitcomb	
24	James Fields	White	—	Male	December 18, 1846	Crawford	Hanging	Susannah Fields	James Whitcomb	
25	Ernest William Gross	White	—	Male	December 13, 1850	Floyd	Hanging	John Peter Smith	Joseph A. Wright	
26	John D. Bennett	White	—	Male	December 5, 1851	Ripley	Hanging	William Maddox	Joseph A. Wright	
27	Benjamin Madden	White	—	Male	May 3, 1855	Allen	Hanging	John Dunbar	Joseph A. Wright	
28	George Keefer	White	—	Male	May 3, 1855	Allen	Hanging	John Dunbar	Joseph A. Wright	
29	John Hubbard	White	—	Male	December 13, 1855	Wabash	Hanging	French family, Edward Boyle	Joseph A. Wright	
30	Greenbury O. Mullinix	White	25	Male	December 18, 1857	Putnam	Hanging	Martha Ann Sublett	Ashbel P. Willard	
31	Henry Hardin	White	—	Male	June 17, 1864	Clark	Hanging	Peter Yesley	Oliver P. Morton	
32	John Hendley	—	—	Male	December 29, 1865	Marion	Hanging	John Cotton	Oliver P. Morton	
33	George W. Sage	—	—	Male	May 25, 1866	Jennings	Hanging	Unnamed child	Oliver P. Morton	
34	Milton White	White	23	Male	November 1, 1867	Madison	Hanging	Daniel Hoppes	Conrad Baker	
35	Oliver Anson Morgan	White	26	Male	December 23, 1869	Vigo	Hanging	John Petri	Conrad Baker	
36	Ben Sawyer	Black	—	Male	May 26, 1871	Vanderburgh	Hanging	Mrs. Sawyer	Conrad Baker	
37	Jerome Brooks	White	22	Male	October 27, 1871	Carroll	Hanging	Asher W. Slater	Conrad Baker	
38	William Thomas Camp	White	—	Male	November 22, 1872	Gibson	Hanging	J. R. Bilderback	Conrad Baker	
39	John Beavers	White	35	Male	February 15, 1878	Jefferson	Hanging	John W. Sewell	James D. Williams	
40	John Achey	White	—	Male	January 29, 1879	Marion	Hanging	George Leggett	James D. Williams	
41	William Merrick	White	—	Male	January 29, 1879	Marion	Hanging	Julia Merrick	James D. Williams	
42	Walter Watson	White	27	Male	April 3, 1879	Vermillion	Hanging	Ezra Compton	James D. Williams	
43	Louis Guetig	White	19	Male	September 19, 1879	Marion	Hanging	Mary McGlew	James D. Williams	
44	Joseph W. Stout (Note: Alias Buck Stout)	White	21	Male	August 8, 1883	Parke	Hanging	Taylor Dunbar	Albert G. Porter	
45	Samuel McDonald	White	—	Male	October 9, 1883	Allen	Hanging	Louis Laurent	Albert G. Porter	
46	John Anderson	White	17	Male	January 25, 1884	Posey	Hanging	James Vandiver	Albert G. Porter	
47	Zachary Snyder	White	21	Male	January 25, 1884	Posey	Hanging	James Vandiver	Albert G. Porter	
48	Charles Butler	White	26	Male	October 10, 1884	Whitley	Hanging	Lavina Abigail Shehan	Albert G. Porter	
49	John Coffey	White	21	Male	October 16, 1885	Montgomery	Hanging	Mr. and Mrs. James McMullen	Isaac P. Gray	
50	Weibern Wartena	White	—	Male	February 26, 1886	Jasper	Hanging	John Dreger	Isaac P. Gray	
51	Robert J. Phillips	Black	—	Male	April 8, 1886	Marion	Hanging	Mrs. Phillips	Isaac P. Gray	
52	John C. Henning	White	55	Male	May 27, 1886	Montgomery	Hanging	Lottie Vollmer	Isaac P. Gray	
53	Sam Archer	White	—	Male	July 9, 1886	Martin	Hanging	Samuel A. Bunch	Isaac P. Gray	
54	Nathaniel S. Bates	White	—	Male	August 26, 1886	Wayne	Hanging	Kittie Bates	Isaac P. Gray	
55	Macy Warner	White	25	Male	March 9, 1888	Clark	Hanging	Frank Harris	Isaac P. Gray	
56	Sylvester Grubb	White	—	Male	April 19, 1889	Knox	Hanging	Gertrude Downey	Alvin Peterson Hovey	
57	James E. Stone	White	—	Male	February 16, 1894	Daviess	Hanging	Wratten family	Claude Matthews	
58	Henry Jones	Black	23	Male	May 7, 1897	Marion	Hanging	Homer Thomas	James A. Mount	
59	Joseph D. Keith	White	40	Male	November 15, 1901	Gibson	Hanging	Nora Kifer	Winfield T. Durbin	
60	John Rinkard	White	63	Male	January 16, 1902	Wabash	Hanging	Laura Rinkard	Winfield T. Durbin	
61	Willis B. Wheeler	White	45	Male	June 6, 1902	Warrick	Hanging	Elias Burns	Winfield T. Durbin	
62	Lewis Russell	Black	48	Male	September 26, 1902	Gibson	Hanging	Perry Stout	Winfield T. Durbin	
63	Matthew Alexander	Black	28	Male	April 16, 1903	Vigo	Hanging	Thomas Burke	Winfield T. Durbin	
64	William Jackson	Black	—	Male	June 12, 1903	Vanderburgh	Hanging	Allan Blankenship	Winfield T. Durbin	
65	Ora E. Copenhaver	White	26	Male	June 12, 1903	Marion	Hanging	Delia Copenhaver	Winfield T. Durbin	
66	Edward Hoover	White	26	Male	November 13, 1903	Marion	Hanging	Frank Sutton	Winfield T. Durbin	
67	Benjamin Springs	Black	34	Male	July 1, 1904	Vigo	Hanging	Jesse Case	Winfield T. Durbin	
68	Jerry Duggins	White	28	Male	July 8, 1904	Vigo	Hanging	Ramsey family	Winfield T. Durbin	
69	Berkley Smith	Black	30	Male	June 30, 1905	Marion	Hanging	Hattie Smith	Frank Hanly	
70	George Williams	Black	28	Male	February 8, 1907	Marion	Hanging	Edward Petticord	Frank Hanly	
71	John Chirka	White	40	Male	February 20, 1914	Lake	Electrocution	Mary Chrika	Samuel M. Ralston	
72	Harry Rasico	White	35	Male	February 20, 1914	Vigo	Electrocution	Bertha and Walter Rasico	Samuel M. Ralston	
73	Robert Collier	Black	34	Male	October 16, 1914	Vanderburgh	Electrocution	John Cain	Samuel M. Ralston	
74	Kelly Robinson	Black	28	Male	February 1, 1916	Marion	Electrocution	John F. Roe	Samuel M. Ralston	
75	William Ray	Black	18	Male	August 5, 1920	Marion	Electrocution	Martha Huff	James P. Goodrich	
76	Will Thornton	Black	21	Male	December 10, 1920	Lake	Electrocution	Nick Kish	James P. Goodrich	
77	William E. Donovan	White	38	Male	June 1, 1922	Montgomery	Electrocution	Mrs. Donovan	Warren T. McCray	
78	Ben Brooks	White	40	Male	December 1, 1922	Bartholomew	Electrocution	Amazona B. Montgomery	Warren T. McCray	
79	Harry Diamond	White	26	Male	November 14, 1924	Porter	Electrocution	Nettie Diamond	Emmett Forest Branch	
80	Peter Vergolini	White	29	Male	January 30, 1925	Lake	Electrocution	Annie Tomick	Edward L. Jackson	
81	John Koval	White	32	Male	October 16, 1925	Lake	Electrocution	Martha Egolowski	Edward L. Jackson	
82	Edward Stewart	Black	25	Male	January 16, 1926	Marion	Electrocution	Ralph Cunningham	Edward L. Jackson	
83	Peter Jankowski	White	27	Male	January 22, 1926	Lake	Electrocution	Andy Hirtzu	Edward L. Jackson	
84	Henry Smith	Black	26	Male	March 26, 1926	Porter	Electrocution	Martin Smith	Edward L. Jackson	
85	Roosevelt Hicks	Black	25	Male	July 29, 1927	Marion	Electrocution	Mrs. Hicks	Edward L. Jackson	
86	John Grzyb (Note: Also known as John Hall)	White	23	Male	April 10, 1928	Elkhart	Electrocution	Louis C. Kreidler	Edward L. Jackson	
87	James Britt	Black	34	Male	March 21, 1930	Lake	Electrocution	Sam Goldberg	Harry G. Leslie	
88	Ignacio Saragoza	White	26	Male	June 24, 1931	LaPorte	Electrocution	Charles Glafcke	Harry G. Leslie	
89	Herbert Johnson	White	33	Male	February 12, 1932	LaGrange	Electrocution	Bert C. Frye	Harry G. Leslie	
90	Ulysses Mackneezer	Black	31	Male	July 1, 1932	Porter	Electrocution	Josephine Odoriczzi	Harry G. Leslie	
91	John E. Moore	White	29	Male	March 2, 1933	Blackford	Electrocution	Mr. and Mrs. Charles A. Moore	Paul V. McNutt	
92	Glen Donald Shustrom	White	24	Male	July 28, 1933	Lake	Electrocution	Alberta Knight	Paul V. McNutt	
93	Charles Vernon Witt	White	28	Male	November 24, 1933	Boone	Electrocution	Lafayette A. Jackson	Paul V. McNutt	
94	Harley Edwards	White	39	Male	March 2, 1934	Jackson	Electrocution	Lillian Edwards	Paul V. McNutt	
95	Louis E. Hamilton	White	28	Male	September 28, 1934	Boone	Electrocution	Lafayette A. Jackson	Paul V. McNutt	
96	Richard Perkins	Black	33	Male	October 1, 1934	Hancock	Electrocution	Carl Heckman	Paul V. McNutt	
97	Edward Coffin	White	21	Male	October 9, 1934	Clark	Electrocution	Harold Amick	Paul V. McNutt	
98	Olivett Griggs	Black	32	Male	June 14, 1935	Lake	Electrocution	Hugo Orescan	Paul V. McNutt	
99	Richard Chapman	White	21	Male	October 19, 1935	Lake	Electrocution	Henry Nolte	Paul V. McNutt	
100	George W. Barrett	White	55	Male	March 24, 1936	Marion	Hanging	Nelson B. Klein	Paul V. McNutt	
101	Gaston Slaughter	Black	37	Male	April 17, 1936	Vigo	Electrocution	Walter Lanfair	Paul V. McNutt	
102	Clarence E. Thomas	White	31	Male	October 19, 1936	Whitley	Electrocution	Harry Zumbrun	Paul V. McNutt	
103	Harry Singer	White	25	Male	December 26, 1936	Wabash	Electrocution	Kaufman family	Paul V. McNutt	
104	Chester Arkuszewski	White	25	Male	March 12, 1937	LaPorte	Electrocution	Ignatz Pazuchoski	M. Clifford Townsend	
105	William A. Kuhlman	White	28	Male	June 10, 1937	Franklin	Electrocution	Harry R. Miller	M. Clifford Townsend	
106	John Joseph Poholsky	White	35	Male	June 10, 1937	Franklin	Electrocution	Harry R. Miller	M. Clifford Townsend	
107	Frank Gore Williams	White	24	Male	June 10, 1937	Franklin	Electrocution	Harry R. Miller	M. Clifford Townsend	
108	Raymond Fortune	White	27	Male	September 17, 1937	Huntington	Electrocution	Orris N. Dokken	M. Clifford Townsend	
109	Willis Fuller	White	29	Male	January 14, 1938	Vigo	Electrocution	Paul Mankin	M. Clifford Townsend	
110	Monroe White	Black	32	Male	May 3, 1938	Newton	Electrocution	Michael Pappas	M. Clifford Townsend	
111	Heber L. Hicks	White	40	Male	May 6, 1938	Franklin	Electrocution	Harry R. Miller	M. Clifford Townsend	
112	John Dee Smith	White	22	Male	June 1, 1938	Whitley	Electrocution	Arlie N. Foster	M. Clifford Townsend	
113	Robert Shaw	White	27	Male	June 28, 1938	LaGrange	Electrocution	Harry Spice	M. Clifford Townsend	
114	Hugh Marshall Jr.	White	22	Male	July 8, 1938	Shelby	Electrocution	William H. Bright	M. Clifford Townsend	
115	Vurtis Neal	White	19	Male	July 8, 1938	Shelby	Electrocution	William H. Bright	M. Clifford Townsend	
116	Henry A. Noelke	White	32	Male	September 30, 1938	Vanderburgh	Electrocution	Hazel and Rita Jo Noelke	M. Clifford Townsend	
117	Rhuel James Dalhover	White	32	Male	November 18, 1938	St. Joseph	Electrocution	Paul Minneman	M. Clifford Townsend	
118	Orelle J. Easton	White	25	Male	June 3, 1939	LaPorte	Electrocution	Ray Dixon	M. Clifford Townsend	
119	James Reed Swain	Black	20	Male	June 23, 1939	Vanderburgh	Electrocution	Christian H. Bredenkamp	M. Clifford Townsend	
120	Adrian Miller	White	31	Male	August 16, 1939	Allen	Electrocution	Alice May Girton	M. Clifford Townsend	
121	Milton Leonard Hawkins	White	25	Male	November 14, 1941	Floyd	Electrocution	Edmund J. Davis	Henry F. Schricker	
122	Virginius Carter	White	33	Male	February 10, 1942	Dearborn	Electrocution	Johnston Agrue family	Henry F. Schricker	
123	Cleveland Greathouse	Black	64	Male	November 26, 1945	Lake	Electrocution	Rebecca Coaklin	Ralph F. Gates	
124	Frank Quarles	Black	44	Male	April 2, 1946	Vanderburgh	Electrocution	Julia Gottman	Ralph F. Gates	
125	Frank Ray Badgley	White	51	Male	February 23, 1949	Jasper	Electrocution	John Gerka and Donald Cook	Henry F. Schricker	
126	Robert Oscar Brown	White	38	Male	February 23, 1949	Jasper	Electrocution	John Gerka and Donald Cook	Henry F. Schricker	
127	Thomas Kallas	White	58	Male	March 29, 1949	Lake	Electrocution	George Stocks	Henry F. Schricker	
128	Franklin Sherman Click	White	31	Male	December 30, 1950	Allen	Electrocution	Phyllis Conine	Henry F. Schricker	
129	Robert Austin Watts	Black	28	Male	January 16, 1951	Bartholomew	Electrocution	Mary Lois Burney	Henry F. Schricker	
130	Richard Kiefer	White	41	Male	June 15, 1961	Allen	Electrocution	Pearl and Dorothy Kiefer	Matthew E. Welsh	

== Demographics ==
Race
Unknown	3	2%
White	100	76%
Black	28	21%
Age
Unknown	43	33%
17–19	4	3%
20–29	46	35%
30–39	23	18%
40–49	8	6%
50–59	5	4%
60–69	2	2%
Gender
Male	131	100%
Female	0	0%
Date of execution
1810–1819	3	2%
1820–1829	10	8%
1830–1839	6	5%
1840–1849	6	5%
1850–1859	6	5%
1860–1869	5	4%
1870–1879	8	6%
1880–1889	13	10%
1890–1899	2	2%
1900–1909	12	9%
1910–1919	4	3%
1920–1929	12	9%
1930–1939	34	26%
1940–1949	7	5%
1950–1959	2	2%
1960–1969	1	1%
Method
Hanging	72	55%
Electrocution	59	45%
Governor (Party)
Thomas Posey (DR)	1	1%
Jonathan Jennings (DR)	4	3%
Ratliff Boon (DR)	1	1%
William Hendricks (DR)	4	3%
James B. Ray (DR)	4	3%
Noah Noble (W)	3	2%
David Wallace (W)	3	2%
Samuel Bigger (W)	3	2%
James Whitcomb (D)	2	2%
Joseph A. Wright (D)	5	4%
Ashbel P. Willard (D)	1	1%
Oliver P. Morton (R)	3	2%
Conrad Baker (R)	5	4%
James D. Williams (D)	5	4%
Albert G. Porter (R)	5	4%
Isaac P. Gray (D)	7	5%
Alvin Peterson Hovey (R)	1	1%
Claude Matthews (D)	1	1%
James A. Mount (R)	1	1%
Winfield T. Durbin (R)	10	8%
Frank Hanly (R)	2	2%
Samuel M. Ralston (D)	4	3%
James P. Goodrich (R)	2	2%
Warren T. McCray (R)	2	2%
Emmett Forest Branch (R)	1	1%
Edward L. Jackson (R)	7	5%
Harry G. Leslie (R)	4	3%
Paul V. McNutt (D)	13	10%
M. Clifford Townsend (D)	17	13%
Henry F. Schricker (D)	7	5%
Ralph F. Gates (R)	2	2%
Matthew E. Welsh (D)	1	1%

== See also ==
- Capital punishment in the United States
- Capital punishment in Indiana
- Lists of people executed in the United States
- List of people executed in Indiana
