= 1924 Indiana gubernatorial election =

- November 4, 1924
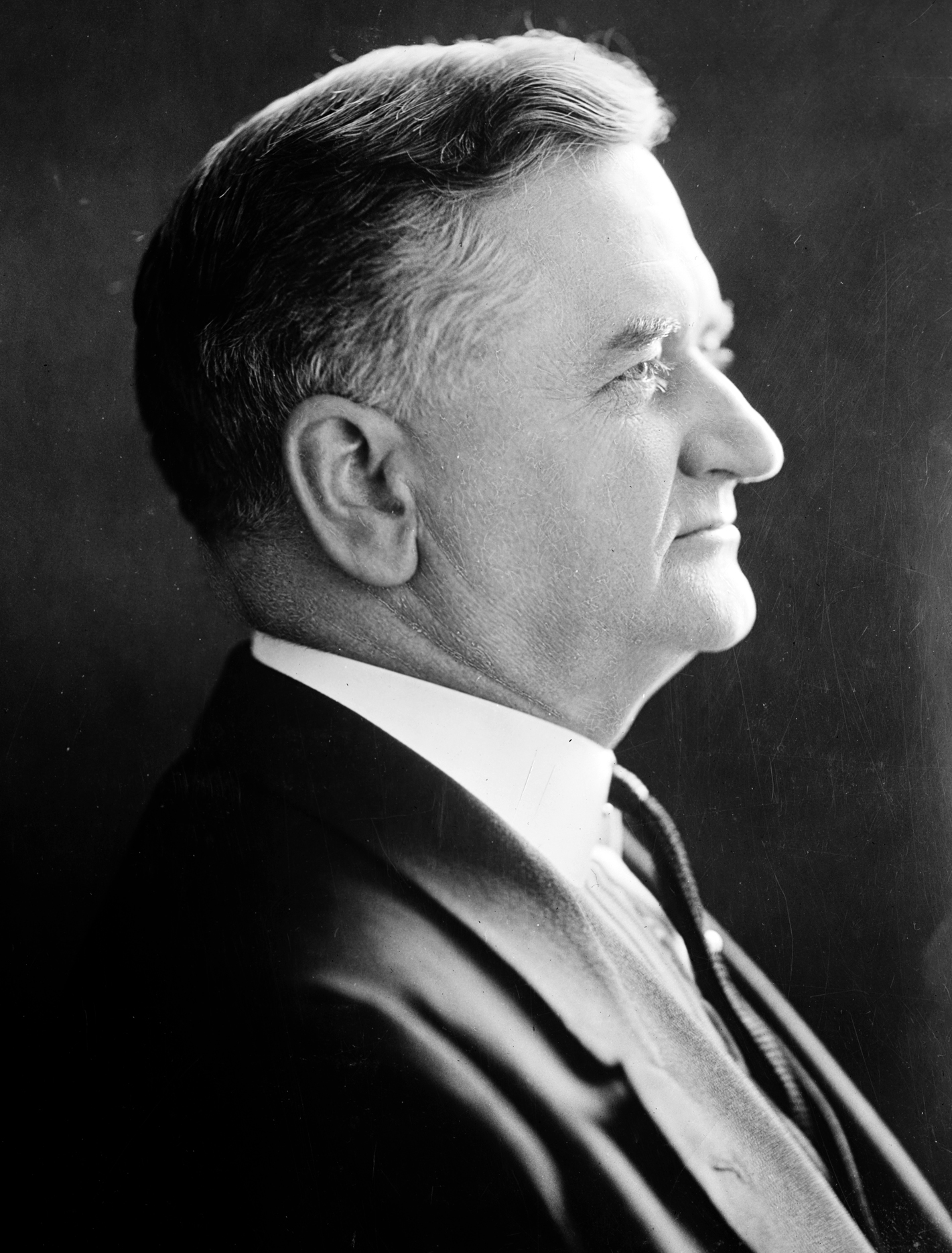

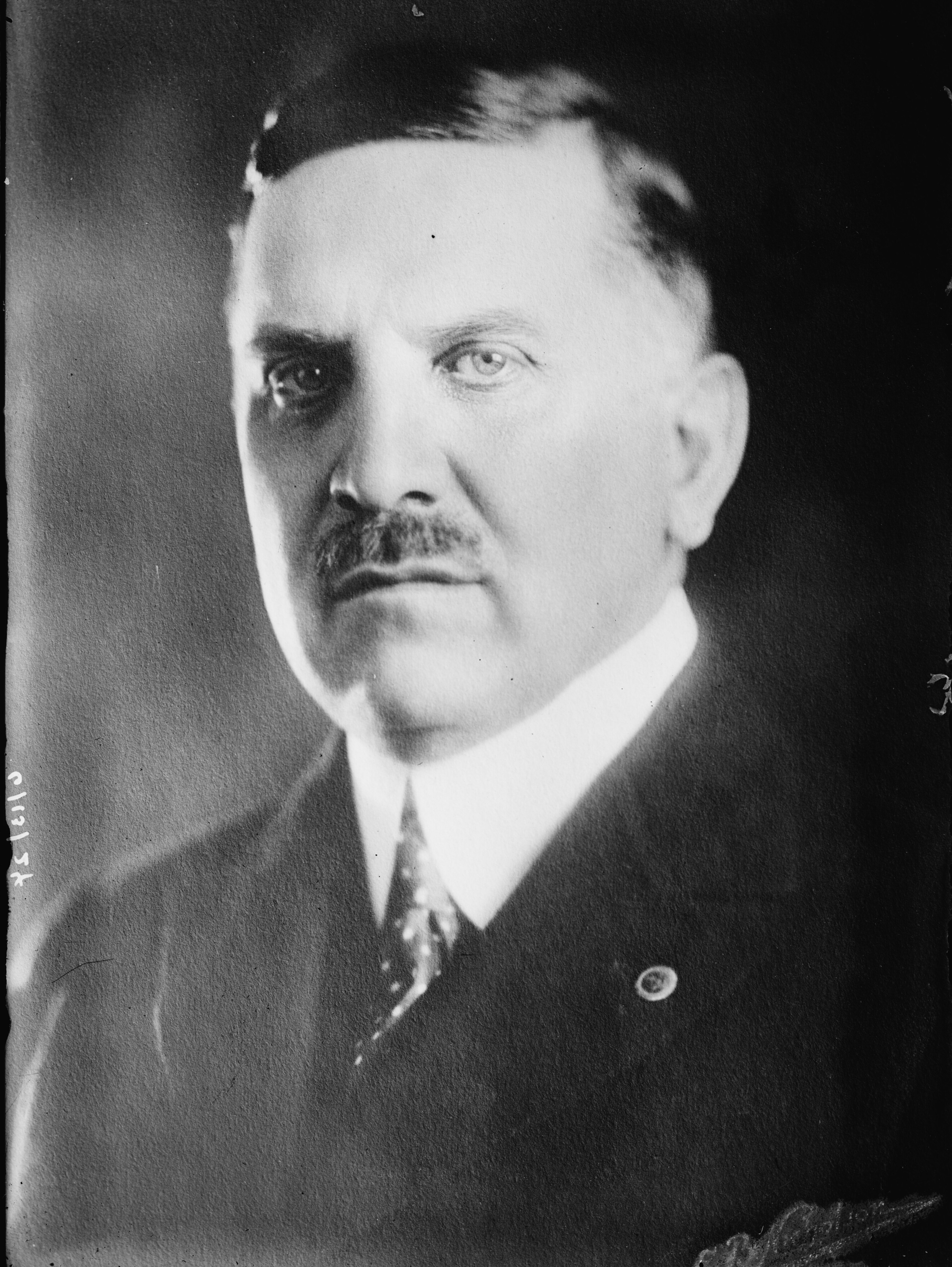
Nominee	Edward L. Jackson	Carleton B. McCulloch
Party	Republican	Democratic
Popular vote	654,184	572,303
Percentage	52.92%	46.29%
- County results Jackson: 40–50% 50–60% 60–70% McCulloch: 40–50% 50–60% 60–70%
Governor before election
Emmett Forest Branch
Republican
Elected Governor
Edward L. Jackson
Republican

The 1924 Indiana gubernatorial election took place on November 4, 1924, under the provisions of the Constitution of Indiana. It was the 31st gubernatorial election in the State of Indiana. Republican Edward L. Jackson defeated Democrat Carleton B. McCulloch. The election took place concurrently with the 1924 United States elections that saw Republicans hold the White House and increase their majorities in both houses of Congress.

Warren T. McCray defeated McCulloch in the 1920 election. His tenure was marked by conflict with the Indiana Ku Klux Klan and Grand Dragon D. C. Stephenson, who grew the organization to be the largest voluntary association in the state by 1924. At Stephenson's behest, Jackson offered McCray a $10,000 bribe to appoint certain Klansmen to state offices. When McCray refused, the Klan exposed his corrupt business dealings. McCray was convicted of mail fraud and resigned the governorship on April 30, 1924, days before the Republican primary election in which he was not a candidate.

Emmett Forest Branch, who succeeded McCray upon his resignation, did not run for re-election. Jackson was the frontrunner to receive the Republican nomination and had the support of Stephenson and the Indiana Klan. His main opponent was Lewis Shank, the outgoing mayor of Indianapolis and one of the Klan's most outspoken Republican critics. Jackson defeated Shank by a margin of more than two to one; the Klan celebrated his victory with a parade through downtown Indianapolis that drew as many as 100,000 onlookers. Democrats were divided in their response to the Klan's rising influence. One faction led by state chairman Thomas Taggart sought to maintain a neutral position on the Klan, while Irish Catholics vocally and strenuously denounced the Klan's activities. McCulloch kept a studied silence through the primary campaign and finished with the most votes for any candidate, but less than the majority requisite for nomination. In the aftermath of the primary, McCulloch declared his opposition to the Klan. He was formally nominated by the Democratic State Convention on a platform condemning the Klan's divisive tactics in targeting racial, ethnic, and religious minorities.

Discussion of the Klan dominated the fall campaign. In a break with tradition, African Americans overwhelmingly supported the Democratic ticket. Stephenson and the Klan worked tirelessly on behalf of the state and national Republican candidates, alleging that a Democratic victory would usher in a Catholic theocracy and the end of white supremacy. Jackson campaigned on law and order, anti-corruption, and support for Prohibition, the last policy being strongly associated with Anti-Catholicism and nativism. Despite the mass defection of historically Republican Black voters, Jackson won the election, albeit with less than the majority for McCray in 1920, amidst a statewide sweep for the Klan's candidates. Jackson carried northern and central Indiana, including White and Hamilton counties where the Klan was strongest. At the same time McCulloch performed well in traditionally Democratic southern Indiana and carried Allen County, Indiana's second most populous.

== Primary elections ==
Primary elections were held on May 6, 1924.

=== Republican primary ===
==== Candidates ====
- Edward L. Jackson, Secretary of State of Indiana
- Samuel Lewis Shank, Mayor of Indianapolis
- Edward C. Toner
- Edgar D. Bush, former Lieutenant Governor under James P. Goodrich
- Ora D. Davis
- Elias W. Dulberger

==== Results ====
Republican primary results
Party	Candidate	Votes	%
Republican	Edward L. Jackson	227,785	55.12
Republican	Samuel Lewis Shank	95,494	23.11
Republican	Edward C. Toner	55,381	13.40
Republican	Edgar D. Bush	22,531	5.45
Republican	Ora D. Davis	9,210	2.23
Republican	Elias W. Dulberger	2,821	0.68
Total votes		413,222	100.00

== General election ==
=== Candidates ===
Major party candidates

- Edward L. Jackson, Republican
- Carleton B. McCulloch, Democratic

Other candidates

- Francis M. Wampler, Socialist
- Basil L. Allen, Prohibition

=== Results ===
1924 Indiana gubernatorial election
Party	Candidate	Votes	%	±%
Republican	Edward L. Jackson	654,184	52.92%	
Democratic	Carleton B. McCulloch	572,303	46.29%	
Socialist	Francis M. Wampler	5,984	0.48%	
Prohibition	Basil L. Allen	3,808	0.31%	
Majority		81,881		
Turnout				
Republican hold		Swing		
