= Ila (given name) =

Given name

- Pronunciation: English: /ˈaɪlə/ or English: /ˈilə/
- Gender: Primarily feminine
- Language: Various

Origin
- Meaning: Various
- Region of origin: Various

Ila is a feminine and masculine given name, with multiple origins.

== Background and meaning ==
As an English feminine name, it might be a spelling variant of Isla, which is derived from the Scottish Islay, an island in the Hebrides. It is also a Hungarian diminutive of Ilona, a name sometimes considered to be a Hungarian version of Helen, that is also used as an independent name. Ila is also a largely feminine name in use in India and Bangladesh. According to one source, it can be an English translation of the Sanskrit feminine name इला, meaning "earth" or "speech" and is also a Yupik feminine name meaning "companion". Ila was also the first woman in Samoan mythology. The name ranked among the 1,000 most popular names for girls in the United States between 1880 and 1953. It then decreased in use, but reappeared on the United States popularity chart in 2020 at 864th position. It has increased in use from year to year and was given to 478 newborn American girls in 2023, the year it was ranked 620th on the popularity chart.

As a masculine name, it originated as a Georgian form of Ilarion or Ilya and other names. It has also been used as a diminutive of other names starting with Il, such as the Finnish name Ilkka.

== People ==
=== Women ===
- Ila Arun (born 1954), Indian actress
- Ila Bhattacharya(1921–2010), Indian politician
- Ila Borders (born 1975), American baseball player
- Ila Marshall Cronin (1893–1955), American politician
- Ila Fiete, Indian–American physicist and computational neuroscientist
- Ila Firouzabadi, Iranian Canadian interdisciplinary artist
- Ila Ghose (1930–2019), Indian mechanical engineer
- Ila Ray Hadley (1942–1961), American Olympic figure skater
- Ila Jones (1903–2017), American supercentenarian
- Ila Loetscher (1904–2000), American aviator and conservationist
- Ila Lóth (1900–1975), Hungarian actress
- Ila Majumder (1941–2011), Bangladeshi classical vocalist
- Ila Mae McAfee (1897–1995), American painter
- Ila Arab Mehta (born 1938), Indian writer
- Ila Mitra (1925–2002), Bangladeshi activist
- Ila Pal Choudhury (1908–1975), Indian politician and social worker
- Ila Paliwal, Indian vocalist, songwriter and producer based in New York City
- Ila Panda (1932–2005), Indian politician
- Ila Pant (born 1938), Indian politician
- Ila Patnaik, Indian economist
- Ila Dianne Thompson (born 1950), British businesswoman

=== Men ===
- Ila Alu (born 1995), Papua New Guinean professional rugby league footballer
- Ila Bêka, Italian artist
- Ila Teromaa (1953–2017), Finnish speedway rider

== Fictional characters ==
- Ila, a minor character in the television series Battlestar Galactica

== See also ==
- Ila (Hinduism), daughter of saint Manu
- Ila (Samoan mythology), the first woman on Tutuila (American Samoa), in Polynesian mythology
