= Hershey Misener =

Indiana suffragist and politician

Zeola Hershey Misener
- Born: Mary Zeola Hershey; October 22, 1878; West Salem, Ohio, US
- Died: October 30, 1966 (aged 88); St. Petersburg, Florida, US
- Occupations: Politician, suffragist
- Relatives: Dorothy Jurney (daughter)

Mary Zeola Hershey Misener (October 22, 1878 – October 30, 1966) was an Indiana suffragist and politician. A Republican, she was the first woman elected to state legislature from her district and one of the first in the state.

== Early life and education ==
Mary Zeola Hershey was born October 22, 1878, in West Salem, Ohio to John and Carrie Stephenson Hershey. She attended the United Brethren College in Westerville, Ohio, and King's School of Oratory in Pittsburgh, Pennsylvania.

== Family ==
Hershey Misener married Michigan City News publisher Herbert Roy Misener in Chicago on February 6, 1906. They had two children, Dorothy Louise, who became an influential newspaperwoman, and Richard Hershey, who founded a major marine construction firm in St. Petersburg, Florida. Hershey Misener lived with her husband and family in Michigan City, Indiana.

== Political career ==
Hershey Misener was a feminist and suffragist who helped organize Indiana's League of Women Voters and for several years served as vice-president. She spoke at the League's 1926 regional convention.

She was elected to the Indiana General Assembly in 1928, the first woman to be elected from her district and one of the first in the state. She was one of three women in the Indiana State House in the 1928–1930 term. Charles Roll in his 1931 history of Indiana called her "one of the prominent Republican women of the state."

While in the legislature, Hershey Misener "was a leader in several stirring political battles."

=== Voter registration law ===
Hershey Misener first achieved notoriety in March 1929 when, as a freshman member of the General Assembly, she sponsored Indiana's first voter registration law and blocked a Senate effort to kill it. She showed up uninvited on the floor of the Indiana Senate during a "midnight session" while some senators were claiming the governor had requested they recall the bill. She asked on whose authority members of the Senate had stated that the governor had asked for reconsideration of the bill, saying, "I have just come from the governor's office, and I am informed that he has not asked this move."

Then-Lieutenant Governor Edgar D. Bush ruled her out of order. She said, "That's all right. I've said everything I want to say anyhow," and left the floor to applause. After her departure, when the lieutenant governor refused to address her comments, a group of senators staged a walkout.

When the Senate requested the General Assembly to recall the bill, Hershey Misener told the General Assembly, "You can kill this bill if you want to, but if you do the Republican party will be to blame."

== Later life ==
She and her husband eventually moved to St. Petersburg, Florida. She was widowed in 1945. She died October 30, 1966, in St. Petersburg at age 88 and is buried in Greenwood cemetery in La Porte County, Indiana.
