= 1928 Indiana gubernatorial election =

- November 6, 1928
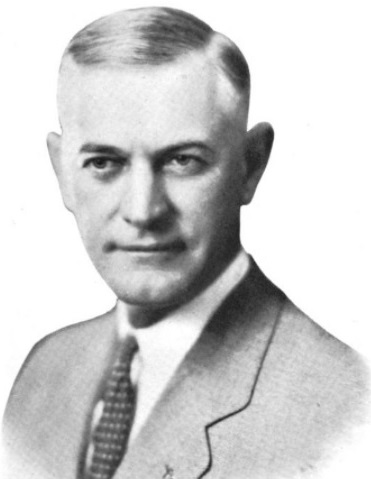

Nominee	Harry G. Leslie	Frank C. Dailey
Party	Republican	Democratic
Popular vote	728,203	683,545
Percentage	51.25%	48.10%
- County results Leslie: 40–50% 50–60% 60–70% Dailey: 40–50% 50–60% 60–70%
Governor before election
Edward L. Jackson
Republican
Elected Governor
Harry G. Leslie
Republican

The 1928 Indiana gubernatorial election was held on November 6, 1928. Republican nominee Harry G. Leslie defeated Democratic nominee Frank C. Dailey with 51.25% of the vote.

== General election ==
=== Candidates ===
Major party candidates

- Harry G. Leslie, Republican, Speaker of the Indiana House of Representatives
- Frank C. Dailey, Democratic

Other candidates

- Albert Stanley, Prohibition
- Clarence E. Bond, Socialist
- Cassimer Benward, Socialist Labor
- Harry W. Garner, Workers
- Henry O. Shaw, National

=== Results ===
1928 Indiana gubernatorial election
Party	Candidate	Votes	%	±%
Republican	Harry G. Leslie	728,203	51.25%	
Democratic	Frank C. Dailey	683,545	48.10%	
Prohibition	Albert Stanley	5,096	0.36%	
Socialist	Clarence E. Bond	3,258	0.23%	
Socialist Labor	Cassimer Benward	424	0.03%	
Workers	Harry W. Garner	319	0.02%	
National	Henry O. Shaw	168	0.01%	
Majority		44,658		
Turnout				
Republican hold		Swing		
