= Governor Townsend =

Governor Townsend may refer to:

- John G. Townsend Jr. (1871–1964), 55th Governor of Delaware
- M. Clifford Townsend (1884–1954), 35th Governor of Indiana
