= Governor Leslie =

Governor Leslie may refer to:

- Harry G. Leslie (1878–1937), 33rd Governor of Indiana
- Preston Leslie (1819–1907), 26th Governor of Kentucky and 9th Territorial Governor of Montana
