= King's School of Oratory =

The King's School of Oratory, or the Byron W. King School of Oratory, was a school for speech arts in Pittsburgh, Pennsylvania that operated from 1888 to at least 1948.

The school taught elocution and speech arts including public speaking, dramatics, voice production (singing and speaking), physical culture, Shakespeare, and cure of speech defects (i.e. speech therapy).

The school conferred degrees as well as operating short courses. Speech therapy was open to various ages.

== History ==
The school was founded by Dr. Byron Wesley King, who had overcome a stammer in his own youth to become a renowned orator. King taught speech and drama at Curry College before opening his own school. King died unexpectedly in 1924 during his return from a speaking engagement. His widow continued to operate the school until at least 1948.

== Notable alumni ==
- Dutton Peterson
- Ila Marshall Cronin
- N. C. Hanks
- Zeola Hershey Misener
- Venzella Jones
