= James J. Nejdl =

American politician

Lieutenant Governor of Indiana
- In office April 30, 1924 – January 12, 1925
- Governor: Warren T. McCray
- Preceded by: Emmett F. Branch
- Succeeded by: F. Harold Van Orman

Personal details
- Born: November 24, 1874 Kingdom of Bohemia (now Czech Republic)
- Died: July 3, 1938 (aged 63) Cook County, Illinois, U.S.
- Party: Republican

James Joseph Nejdl (/ˈneɪdəl/ NAY-dəl) (1874 – 1938) was a politician from the U.S. state of Indiana. In 1924 and 1925 he served as acting Lieutenant Governor of Indiana.

== Life ==
James Nejdl was born on 24 November 1874 in the Bohemian Kingdom which later became the Czech Republic. He emigrated to the United States in 1898 with his parents to Chicago. Like his family, James was a bricklayer who turned contractor. James and Mary, his wife, settled down in Whiting, Indiana, sometime before 1900. James joined the Whiting City Council in 1902, and left in 1904. James was appointed as Post Master General July 1, 1909.

== Political career ==
He joined the Republican Party and was elected to the Indiana Senate in 1916, inaugurated 1917. He was elected as one of two senators from Lake County. Although he received the fewest votes, of three candidates, at the primaries Nejdl still moved on to November.

James became the President Pro Tempore after a scandal hit Indiana. On 30 April 1924 Governor Warren T. McCray resigned from his office following his conviction for mail fraud. His Lieutenant Governor Emmett Forrest Branch followed him as new Governor of Indiana. According to the state constitution the now vacant position of the Lieutenant Governor was filled by the President Pro Tempore of the State Senate, James Nejdl. He served in this position between 30 April 1924 and 12 January 1925 when his term ended.

=== Pension Legislative Work ===
James's big two legislative contributions were of Wet Laws/Petitions and Old-Age Pensions.

== Death ==
His wife died in 1937. James Nejdl died on 3 July 1938 in Cook County in Illinois. He died of Pneumonia at the age of 63.

Political offices
Preceded by Emmett Forrest Branch	Lieutenant Governor of Indiana; 1924–1925	Succeeded by F. Harold Van Orman
