= Governor Branch =

Governor Branch may refer to:

- Emmett Forest Branch (1874–1932), 31st Governor of Indiana
- John Branch (1782–1863), Territorial Governor of Florida
