= N. C. Hanks =

N. C. (Nymphas Corey) Hanks (3 November 1882 - 26 January 1955) was a scholar of the Classics and popular lecturer in the first half of the twentieth century.

== Early life ==
Hanks's grandfathers were Ephraim K. Hanks, first cousin of Nancy Hanks and a member of the Mormon Battalion, and N. C. Murdock, nephew of William Stacy and also a Mormon pioneer.

== Career ==
In about 1903, Hanks lost his hands and eyes in a mining accident. The pain of the accident and the recovery led to frequent wishing for death. He credited a doctor's sharing of Edmund Vance Cooke's poem "How Did You Die?" for starting his drive to recovery and the poem became a frequent part of his lectures later.

After teaching himself to take over his personal care, he began to pay for his education as a salesman. He attended King's School of Oratory in Pittsburgh, Stanford University, Harvard University, and Columbia University. He particularly attributed his success to Byron W. King (of King's Oratory) for his success, and his professor John C. Swensen for helping him get make contacts at Stanford, and David Starr Jordan for "the best lectures I ever heard."

Hanks made his living travelling tens of thousands of miles, delivering his lectures. He was also considered remarkable for memorizing tens of thousands of words from the Classics.

== Later life ==
He would later marry a nurse, Mary Elizabeth Shive, in 1919. They lived in Heyburn, Idaho. She died in 1926.

Hanks died in 1955 of heart failure. He is interred in Heber, Utah.

== Books ==
- Up from the Hills (1921)
- Days of Naughty Men. | Grip of Native Sod. | Would You Live it Again? (1938)
- Men of the Rockies (1944)
