= Hugh Thomas Miller =

American politician

26th Lieutenant Governor of Indiana
- In office January 9, 1905 – January 11, 1909
- Governor: Frank Hanly
- Preceded by: Newton W. Gilbert
- Succeeded by: Frank J. Hall

Personal details
- Born: March 21, 1867 Johnson County, Indiana, U.S.
- Died: May 26, 1947 (aged 80) Columbus, Indiana, U.S.
- Party: Republican
- Spouse: Nettie Irwin Sweeney
- Children: 2, including J. Irwin Miller
- Education: Butler University

Hugh Thomas Miller (March 21, 1867 – May 26, 1947) was a politician from the U.S. state of Indiana. Between 1905 and 1909, he served as lieutenant governor of Indiana.

== Life ==
Hugh Miller was born in Johnson County in Indiana. In 1888, he graduated from Butler University. In the following years, until 1892, he taught French at the university. Afterwards, he studied history in Paris and Berlin. Between 1893 and 1899, he was a history professor at Butler University and in 1899, he accepted the position of assistant cashier at Irwin's Bank in Columbus, Indiana.

Miller joined the Republican Party and in 1902, he was elected to the Indiana House of Representatives. Two years later, he ran successfully for the office of lieutenant governor of Indiana. He served in this position between 9 January 1905 and 11 January 1909, when his term ended. In this function, he was the deputy of Governor Frank Hanly and he presided over the Indiana Senate. In 1914, he was a candidate for U.S. senator.

After his term as lieutenant governor, Hugh Miller started a business career. In 1910, he accepted the position of director and vice-president of the Union Trust Company. He also was a director of the Union Starch and Refining Company, and the Cummins Engine Company. He died on 26 May 1947 in Columbus, Indiana.

Miller was married to Nettie Irwin Sweeney. They had two children, Elizabeth Clementine Miller and Joseph Irwin Miller.

Political offices
Preceded by Newton W. Gilbert	Lieutenant Governor of Indiana; 1905–1909	Succeeded by Frank J. Hall
