= F. Harold Van Orman =

American politician

31st Lieutenant Governor of Indiana
- In office January 12, 1925 – January 14, 1929
- Governor: Edward L. Jackson
- Preceded by: James J. Nejdl
- Succeeded by: Edgar D. Bush

Personal details
- Born: September 26, 1884 Flint, Michigan, U.S.
- Died: January 6, 1958 (aged 73) Evansville, Indiana, U.S.
- Party: Republican
- Education: Harvard University (BA)

Frederick Harold Van Orman (26 September 1884 – 6 January 1958) was a politician from the U.S. state of Indiana. Between 1925 and 1929 he served as Lieutenant Governor of Indiana.

== Life ==
Van Orman was born in Flint, Michigan. His father was the owner of several hotels in Indiana, Michigan, Ohio, Illinois and other states. He attended the Evansville High School in Indiana and in 1904 he graduated from the Phillips Exeter Academy in New Hampshire. Afterwards he studied at the Harvard University, where he took his A. B. degree in 1908. For the most time of his life he resided in Evansville, Indiana. After he left the Harvard University in 1908 he worked in his father's hotel business and in 1926 he became president of the hotel chain. In Indiana he was also a member of various institutions and organizations.

He joined the Republican Party and between 1920 and 1924 he was a member of the Indiana Senate. In 1924, he was elected Lieutenant Governor of Indiana, backed by the Ku Klux Klan. He served in this position between 12 January 1925 and 14 January 1929 when his term ended. In this function he was the deputy of governor Edward L. Jackson, also a Klan-backed politician, and he presided over the State Senate. In 1932 he was a delegate and in 1936 an alternate delegate to the Republican National Conventions.

He died on 6 January 1958 in Evansville and was buried on the Oak Hill Cemetery in that city.

Political offices
Preceded by James J. Nejdl	Lieutenant Governor of Indiana; 1925–1929	Succeeded by Edgar D. Bush
