= 1920 Indiana gubernatorial election =

- November 2, 1920

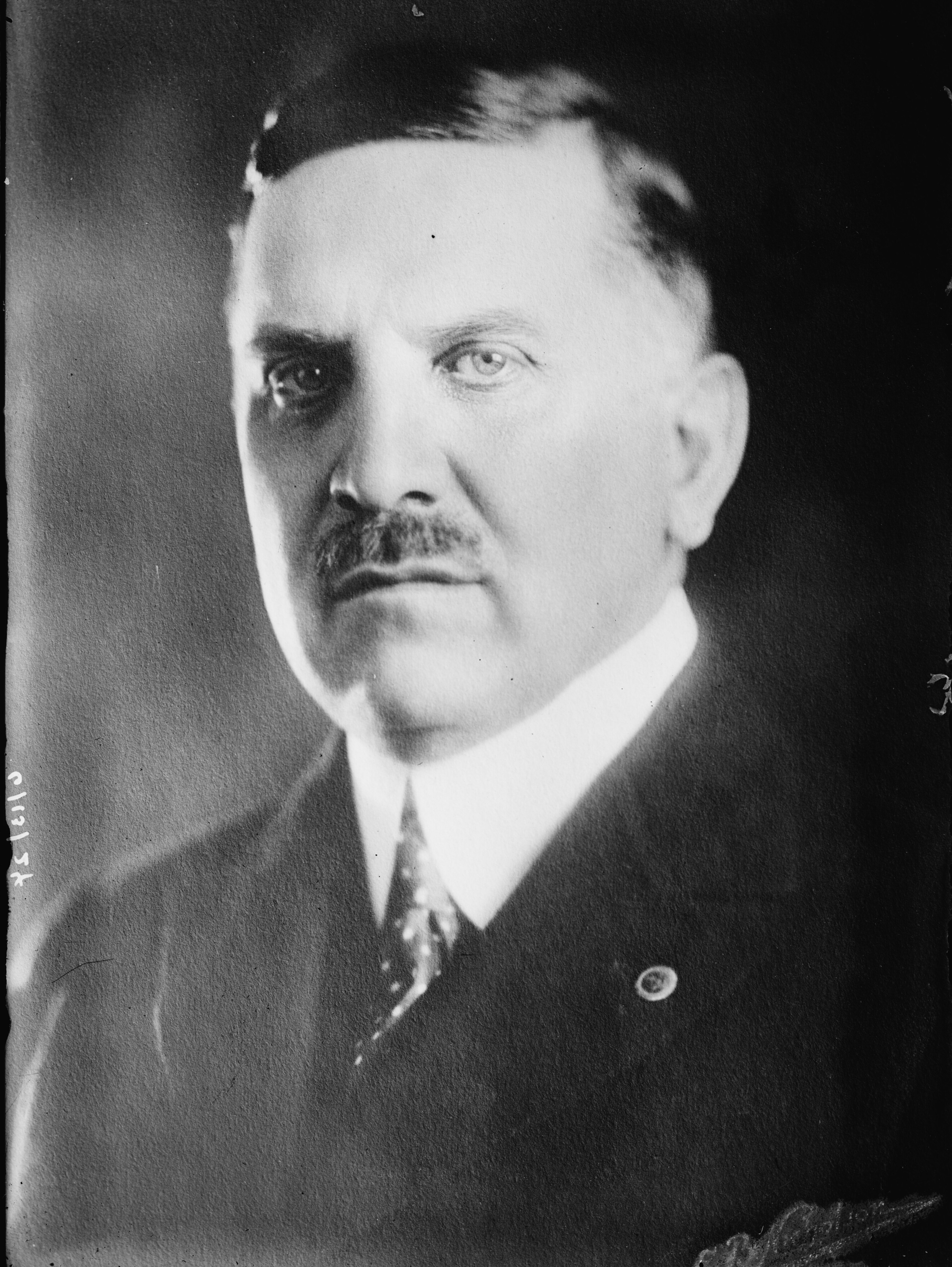
Nominee	Warren T. McCray	Carleton B. McCulloch
Party	Republican	Democratic
Popular vote	683,253	515,253
Percentage	54.63%	41.20%
- County results McCray: 40–50% 50–60% 60–70% 70–80% McCulloch: 40–50% 50–60% 60–70%
Governor before election
James P. Goodrich
Republican
Elected Governor
Warren T. McCray
Republican

The 1920 Indiana gubernatorial election was held on November 2, 1920. Republican nominee Warren T. McCray defeated Democratic nominee Carleton B. McCulloch with 54.63% of the vote.

== Primary elections ==
Primary elections were held on May 4, 1920.

=== Democratic primary ===
==== Candidates ====
- Carleton B. McCulloch, doctor
- Mason J. Niblack, former state legislator
- John Isenbarger, farmer
- James K. Risk, businessman

==== Results ====
Democratic primary results
Party	Candidate	Votes	%
Democratic	Carleton B. McCulloch	47,535	46.29
Democratic	Mason J. Niblack	20,798	20.26
Democratic	John Isenbarger	19,140	18.64
Democratic	James K. Risk	15,207	14.81
Total votes		102,680	100.00

=== Republican primary ===
==== Candidates ====
- Warren T. McCray, Chairman of the Food Conservation Committee of Indiana
- James W. Fesler
- Edward C. Toner

==== Results ====
Republican primary results
Party	Candidate	Votes	%
Republican	Warren T. McCray	109,742	51.13
Republican	James W. Fesler	63,737	29.69
Republican	Edward C. Toner	41,175	19.18
Total votes		214,654	100.00

== General election ==
=== Candidates ===
Major party candidates

- Warren T. McCray, Republican
- Carleton B. McCulloch, Democratic

Other candidates

- Andrew J. Hart, Socialist
- James M. Zion, Farmer–Labor
- Charles M. Kroft, Prohibition

=== Results ===
1920 Indiana gubernatorial election
Party	Candidate	Votes	%
Republican	Warren T. McCray	683,253	54.63%
Democratic	Carleton B. McCulloch	515,253	41.20%
Socialist	Andrew J. Hart	23,228	1.86%
Farmer–Labor	James M. Zion	16,626	1.33%
Prohibition	Charles M. Kroft	12,235	0.98%
Total votes		1,250,595	100.00%
Republican hold			
