= Venzella Jones =

Actress, playwright, theatre director (1893–1973)

Venzella Newsome Jones (1893–1973) was a black actress, orator, playwright, drama teacher, and theatre director.

== Education and career ==
Jones was born in Ohio. She attended King's School of Oratory in Pittsburgh, becoming its first black graduate. Later she taught drama at Rust College, Mississippi and at Morgan State College in Baltimore.

She organised the Imperial Art Players in Pittsburgh in 1924 and later formed the eponymous Venzella Jones Repertory Group.

She was the Director of the Federal Theatre Project’s Negro Youth Theatre.
