= Fred Schortemeier =

American politician and lawyer (1889–1965)

Fred E. Schortemeier

37th Secretary of State of Indiana
- In office December 1, 1924 – December 1, 1928
- Preceded by: Edward L. Jackson
- Succeeded by: Otto G. Fifield

Personal details
- Party: Republican
- Education: Butler University (BA); Harvard Law School (LLB)
- Profession: Lawyer, politician

Frederick Edward "Fred" Schortemeier (1889–1965) was an American lawyer and Republican politician from Indiana who served as the 37th Secretary of State of Indiana from December 1, 1924, to December 1, 1928.

Political offices
Preceded by Edward L. Jackson	Secretary of State of Indiana; 1924–1928	Succeeded by Otto G. Fifield
