= William P. O'Neill =

American politician

William O'Neill

28th Lieutenant Governor of Indiana
- In office January 13, 1913 – January 8, 1917
- Governor: Samuel M. Ralston
- Preceded by: Frank J. Hall
- Succeeded by: Edgar D. Bush

Personal details
- Born: February 7, 1874 South Bend, Indiana, U.S.
- Died: 1955 (aged 80–81) Mishawaka, Indiana, U.S
- Party: Democratic

William P. O’Neill (7 February 1874 – 17 February 1955) was a politician from the U.S. state of Indiana. Between 1913 and 1917 he served as Lieutenant Governor of Indiana.

== Life ==
William O’Neill was born in South Bend, St. Joseph County in Indiana. There is not much information available about him. He founded and published the Mishawaka Democrat which operated from 1891 through 1911. He joined the Democratic Party and in 1912 he was elected to the office of the Lieutenant Governor of Indiana. He served in this position between 13 January 1913 and 8 January 1917 when his term ended. In this function he was the deputy of Governor Samuel M. Ralston and he presided over the Indiana Senate.

William O’Neill died in 1955 in Mishawaka, St. Joseph County, in Indiana.

== Literature ==
- Indiana, Past and Present. Volume 1. M. R. Hyman Company, Indianapolis, Ind., 1914, page 55.

Political offices
Preceded by Frank J. Hall	Lieutenant Governor of Indiana; 1913–1917	Succeeded by Edgar D. Bush
