= Frank J. Hall =

American politician

Frank Hall

27th Lieutenant Governor of Indiana
- In office January 11, 1909 – January 13, 1913
- Governor: Thomas R. Marshall
- Preceded by: Hugh T. Miller
- Succeeded by: William P. O'Neill

Personal details
- Born: February 16, 1844 Rush County, Indiana, U.S.
- Died: August 19, 1925 (aged 81) Indianapolis, Indiana, U.S
- Party: Democratic
- Education: Indiana University

Frank J. Hall (16 February 1844 – 19 August 1925) was an American politician from Indiana. Between 1909 and 1913, he served as Lieutenant Governor of Indiana.

== Life ==
Frank Hall was born in Rush County in Indiana where he grew up on his father's farm. At the age of 17 he worked as a teacher for two years. Later he studied law at the Indiana University in Bloomington, and in 1869, he was admitted to the bar. Afterwards he became an attorney. Among his clients were several Railroad Companies. He joined the Democratic Party and was elected to the mayor's office in Rushville, Indiana. Twice he ran unsuccessfully for a seat in the Indiana House of Representatives.

In 1908, Frank Hall campaigned successfully for the office of the Lieutenant Governor of Indiana. He served in this position from January 11, 1909, to January 13, 1913, when his term ended. As Lieutenant Governor, he was the deputy to Governor Thomas R. Marshall and he presided over the Indiana Senate.

Hall died on August 19, 1925, in Franklin, Indiana.

== Literature ==
Indiana University. Alumni Association: Indiana University Alumni Quarterly. : volume 12, Alumni Association of Indiana University, Bloomington, Ind., 1925, page 520.

Political offices
Preceded by Hugh Thomas Miller	Lieutenant Governor of Indiana; 1909–1913	Succeeded by William P. O'Neill
