= Ila Bhattacharya =

Indian politician

Member of Parliament, Rajya Sabha
- In office 1980-1986
- Constituency: Tripura

Personal details
- Born: 25 September 1921 Dibrugarh, Assam, British India
- Died: 23 May 2010 (aged 88)
- Party: Communist Party of India (Marxist)
- Spouse: Narendra Nath Bhattacharya
- Children: 5 daughters and 2 sons

Ila Bhattacharya (1921-2010) was an Indian politician. She was a Member of Parliament, representing Tripura in the Rajya Sabha, the upper house of India's Parliament, as a member of the Communist Party of India (Marxist). Her parents Jatindra Mohan Bandhopadhyaya and Saraju Bala originally belonged to the Madharipur village in Faridpur District.
