= Edward L. Jackson =

American politician (1873–1954)

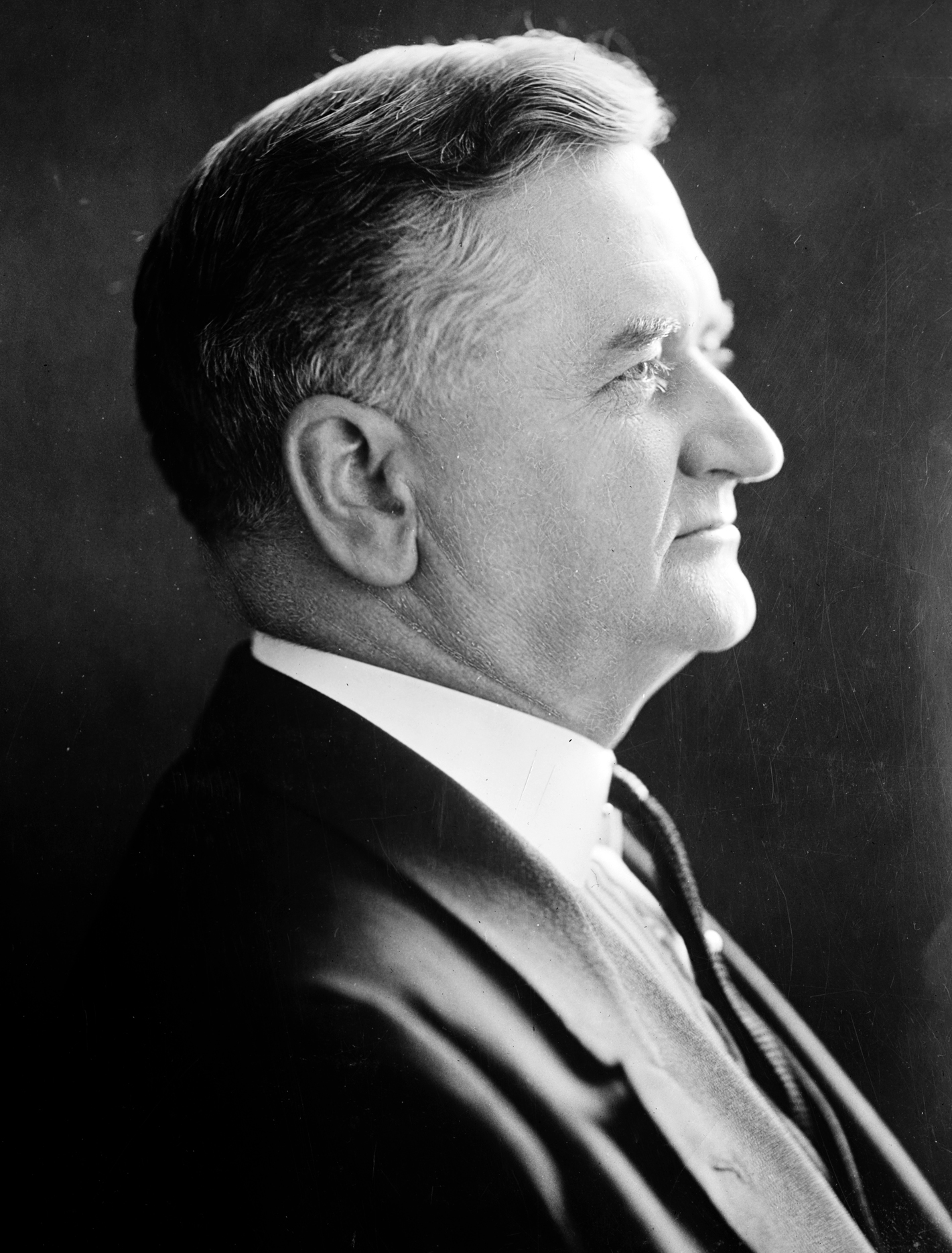

32nd Governor of Indiana
- In office January 12, 1925 – January 14, 1929
- Lieutenant: F. Harold Van Orman
- Preceded by: Emmett Forrest Branch
- Succeeded by: Harry G. Leslie

36th Secretary of State of Indiana
- In office January 22, 1920 – November 27, 1924
- Governor: James P. Goodrich; Warren T. McCray; Emmett Forrest Branch
- Preceded by: William A. Roach
- Succeeded by: Fred Schortemeier

34th Secretary of State of Indiana
- In office November 27, 1916 – November 21, 1917
- Governor: Samuel M. Ralston; James P. Goodrich
- Preceded by: Homer L. Cook
- Succeeded by: William A. Roach

Personal details
- Born: December 27, 1873 Howard County, Indiana, U.S.
- Died: November 18, 1954 (aged 80) Orleans, Indiana, U.S.
- Party: Republican
- Spouse(s): Rosa Wilkinson, Lydia Beatty Pierce
- Children: 3 (1 adopted)

Military service
- Allegiance: United States of America
- Branch/service: United States Army
- Years of service: 1917–1919
- Rank: Major
- Battles/wars: World War I

Edward L. Jackson (December 27, 1873 – November 18, 1954) was an American attorney, judge and politician, elected the 32nd governor of the U.S. state of Indiana from January 12, 1925, to January 14, 1929. He had also been elected as Secretary of State of Indiana.

Jackson repeatedly associated with Ku Klux Klan leaders, but there is no evidence he ever joined. He became involved in several political scandals. In 1927, he was investigated and tried on bribery charges related to having tried to bribe the previous governor, but was not convicted as the statute of limitations had expired. After finishing his term in office, he left in disgrace and never ran again for public office.

== Early life and education ==
Edward Jackson was born on December 27, 1873, in Howard County, Indiana, the son of Presley and Mary Howell Jackson. His family were members of the Disciples of Christ church. His father was a mill worker. As a boy, Edward delivered newspapers and attended public schools.

After completing school he took a job in a factory producing stakes.

== Marriage and family ==
After beginning his career as a lawyer, Jackson married Rosa Wilkinson on February 20, 1897. The couple had two daughters, Helen and Gertrude. Rosa died in October 1919 during the influenza epidemic.

Jackson remarried about a year later, on November 23, 1920, to Lydia Beaty Pierce. The couple adopted an infant son, whom they named Edward Jackson Jr.

== Law career ==
Jackson began reading the law as a legal apprentice after he finished school. He passed the bar and opened a law office in Kennard in 1893. His business was not very successful at first, and he worked in a brickyard to earn a steady income, especially to support his family.

By 1898, his law office had become a full-time position. He worked on many cases for the Henry County prosecutor's office.

== Political career ==
In 1901, Jackson ran successfully for the prosecutor's position and served until 1906. He was elected as a county circuit court judge in 1907 and remained on the court until 1914, during which time he gained a strong political base of support.

His popularity in the Republican Party helped in winning the nomination to run for Indiana Secretary of State in 1916, which he won. His time in office was brief however, as he resigned shortly after World War I broke out and enlisted in the United States Army. He was commissioned as a captain in November 1917 and stationed in Toledo, Ohio. He was soon moved to Battle Creek, Michigan, and then Lafayette, Indiana, where he was promoted to major and made commandant of a training facility. He continued to train new recruits until he was discharged from the army in February 1919.

== Ku Klux Klan ==
After leaving the military, Jackson opened a new law office in Lafayette, Indiana. In 1920 Governor of Indiana James P. Goodrich appointed Jackson as Secretary of State after the incumbent William Roach died in January 1920.

In 1922, he campaigned for the office and was elected. Jackson was interested in running for higher office, and began to seek out supporters for his coming bid for the governorship. There is no evidence that Jackson ever was a member of the KKK. However, he was approached by D. C. Stephenson, Grand Dragon of the Indiana Klan, who discussed issues of interest to the Klan, such as eliminating the influence of Catholics, Jews and 'coloreds'.

Although the full extent of the Klan's power was unknown at that time, it claimed that its members occupied more than half the seats in the Indiana General Assembly, and a large percentage of the local offices in Indiana. Historians estimate that nearly a third of the men in the state belonged to the Klan. At the time, the public generally perceived the Klan members as defenders of justice, morality, and Americanism. The organization's reputation and influence made Jackson decide to accept their support. Many Hoosiers feared that the Klan would control the state legislature in 1924. However, historian James Madison points out that, "The Klan's effort ended in nearly total failure."

Jackson soon found his deal with Klan leaders to be troublesome, as the Klan began demanding specific actions from him. He granted the Klan a state charter, to the disgust of Republican Governor Warren T. McCray who was one of the only state officials to try to battle them. Jackson worked to persuade McCray to support the Klan's agenda, and in 1923, Jackson offered McCray a $10,000 bribe on behalf of Stephenson if he would fill several public offices with Klan members. McCray, a millionaire, declined the bribe and was offended at the offer. The dealing was behind the scenes and not made public. The Klan then had McCray charged with mail fraud due to a separate transaction; McCray was convicted of the charge and resigned as governor on April 30, 1924.

== Governor ==
Both McCray and his successor, Emmett Forest Branch, declined to run for governor in 1924, leaving Jackson as the Republican front runner. Jackson's main opponent for the Republican nomination was Samuel Lewis Shank, the strongly anti-Klan mayor of Indianapolis who had banned masked parades in the city. Democrats had long dominated the Catholic and Jewish vote in Indiana, but most African-Americans still voted Republican despite the Republican Party's abandonment of civil rights since the Compromise of 1877. Jackson was accused of suppressing the black vote in the primary and defeated Shank in the primary by a margin of more than two to one. After the primary, Shank granted the Klan the right to march in Indianapolis because he believed that Indiana voters now desired to be ruled by the Klan. The Klan celebrated Jackson's victory by doing a march through the black areas of Indianapolis that may have attracted as many as 100,000 onlookers. Stephenson declared at the march that "We must put over Jackson our very right to existence" and "The fiery cross is going to burn at every crossroads in Indiana, as long as there is a white man left in the state." Stephenson claimed to control 85% of the delegates at the state Republican convention, and the state Republican Party came to increasingly be viewed as little more than a Klan organization.

Indiana Democratic politicians were divided on whether to take a stand against the Klan or to remain neutral on the Klan. Although few Democratic politicians in Indiana had joined the Klan, many rank and file Democratic voters in Indiana had joined the Klan, and some Indiana Democratic politicians were concerned about alienating pro-Klan voters. Irish Catholics counter-argued that an anti-Klan stance would attract the vote of not only African Americans, but also more tolerant white Protestants. Democratic gubernatorial nominee Carleton McCullouch, who wanted to take a neutral position on the Klan, compromised with anti-Klan Democrats at the state Democratic convention by agreeing to a "Freedom and Liberty" plank that did not technically mention the Klan by name, but declared that the Indiana Republican Party had "retired from the political arena", the Republican Party had "been delivered into the hands of an organization which has no place in politics and which promulgates doctrines which tend to break down the safeguards which the Constitution throws around every citizen" and that 1920s Indiana Republicans were "repungant to the principles of government" advocated by Civil War Indiana Republicans Abraham Lincoln and Oliver Morton.

Both McCullouch and Jackson made little mention of the Klan after their respective party's conventions, as McCulloch was concerned about alienating pro-Klan voters and Jackson was concerned about alienating black voters. The Klan issue nonetheless remained the unspoken elephant in the room that dominated the gubernatorial election and Indiana life as a whole. McCullouch dominated Jackson among the traditionally Republican black voters on election day. However, Jackson won the election by 3% by dominating in working class white Protestant districts, including in white Protestant districts that had voted Democratic in previous elections.

Jackson was inaugurated on January 12, 1925. He stressed the need to run the government economically. His administration oversaw the payoff of the state's US$3.5 million debt and a significant reduction in taxes. He also increased attention on the Department of Conservation. The Indiana Dunes State Park and the George Rogers Clark Memorial were established with his support.

=== Prohibition ===
As governor, Jackson supported stronger prohibition. The Wright Bone Dry Law was passed by the General Assembly to increase penalties and jail time for prohibition violators. It closed some loopholes in the prohibition laws, such as banning the sale of whiskey for medicinal purposes. The law also lowered the legal standard to convict people of Prohibition violations, and gave prosecutors monetary rewards for Prohibition convictions. Some legislators reportedly celebrated the passage of the law by holding a drunken party themselves. Jackson was soon caught up in a small scandal when his wife became sick in 1925. Jackson personally procured some medicinal whiskey, and she soon recovered from her sickness. Word soon got out about his actions, but he asked the public for forgiveness. He assured constituents that their prayers and not the whiskey had cured his wife.

=== Klan politics ===
After the Klan-dominated Republican Party won the governorship and large majorities in the legislature in 1924, it was widely believed that the Klan would pass whatever it wanted in the 1925 legislature. Instead, the 1925 legislature became an ineffective embarrassment because Stephenson had always been vague about what legislation he actually wanted to pass, and Stephenson was increasingly fighting with the Southerners at the Klan's national office in Atlanta. Various anti-Catholic legislation was proposed, such as bills that would have essentially banned nuns or graduates of Catholic colleges from teaching in public schools, but none of the anti-Catholic legislation passed. The only Klan legislation that actually passed was a law that required the flying of the US flag at public schools.

In the autumn of 1925, United States Senator Samuel M. Ralston died in office, and Jackson needed to appoint his replacement. He chose Arthur Raymond Robinson at the advice of Stephenson. Many Republican leaders were upset with Jackson over the choice, as they had favored the appointment of former senator Albert J. Beveridge. Opponents began to charge that the Klan was in control of the governor's office.

The following year Indiana Attorney General Arthur L. Gilliom arrested Edward Shumaker, the leader of the Indiana Anti-Saloon League. He charged Shumaker with contempt of court because of newsletters he was circulating that attacked the Indiana Supreme Court; he accused them of lax enforcement of prohibition laws. He was convicted and sentenced to serve time on the Indiana work farm. As Shumaker was the leader of a key Republican support group, Jackson pardoned him. Gilliom took the pardon to court and had the pardon overturned by the Supreme Court. Shumaker was required to serve his term.

High-profile problems continued for Jackson. In 1925, Stephenson had been arrested and tried for the rape and murder of Madge Oberholtzer. He was convicted and sentenced to life in prison. He demanded that Jackson pardon him, but the governor refused. Angered, Stephenson started talking to reporters in 1927 from the Indianapolis Times and provided names of people who had been paid bribes by the Klan and taken part in other illegal activity. He had kept a "black box" of records that provided evidence for many of his accusations. He exposed Jackson's attempt to bribe McCray with $10,000 years earlier.

Numerous religious and civic groups in the state demanded for Jackson to resign. His case, like many other Klan bribery cases, was brought to court. His trial ended in a hung jury, and the statute of limitations precluded any possible conviction. Despite the final result of the trial, Jackson was widely criticized across the state; he left office disgraced and ended his political career. The Indiana Klan's power collapsed and the scandals contributed to the decline of Klan membership nationally.

=== State parks ===
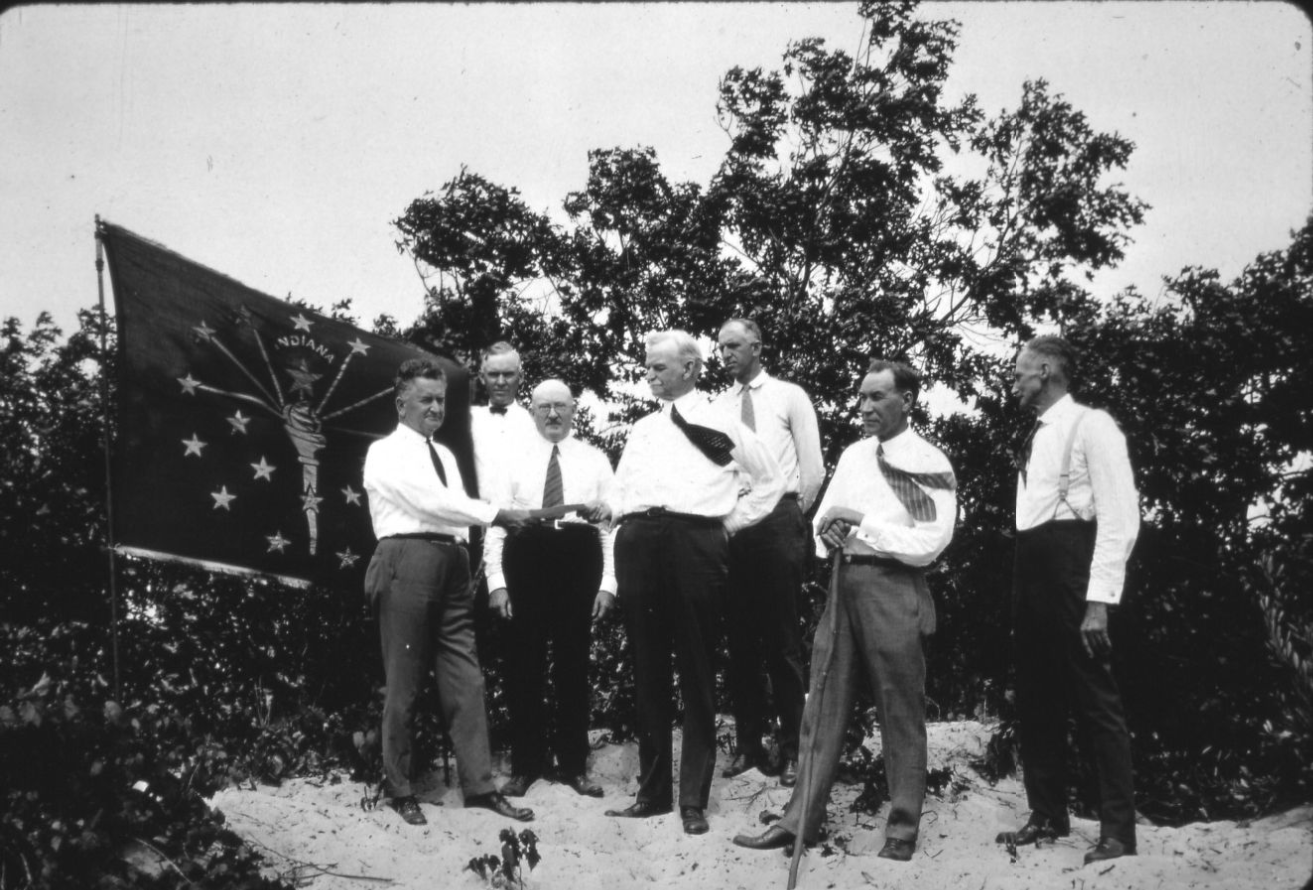
Edward Jackson presenting the deed of the first purchase of the Indiana Dunes State Park.

Numerous state parks were established during Jackson's term as governor: Brown County State Park, Indiana Dunes State Park in Porter County, Pokagon State Park in Steuben County, and Spring Mill State Park in Lawrence County (see List of Indiana state parks for exact years of park's establishment).

== Later life ==
Jackson resumed his law practice, opening an office in Indianapolis. He lived there until 1937. That year he moved to a large farm he purchased near Orleans, where he raised cattle and maintained an apple orchard. He was active in several local clubs. In 1948, he suffered a massive stroke that left him bedridden for the rest of his life. He died in his home on November 18, 1954, and was buried in the Green Hill Cemetery of Orleans.

== See also ==
- Indiana Klan
- List of governors of Indiana

Party political offices
Preceded by Warren T. McCray	Republican nominee for Governor of Indiana; 1924	Succeeded by Harry G. Leslie
Political offices
Preceded by Homer L. Cook	Secretary of State of Indiana; 1916–1917	Succeeded by William A. Roach
Preceded by William A. Roach	Secretary of State of Indiana; 1920–1924	Succeeded by Fred Schortemeier
Preceded by Emmett Forrest Branch	Governor of Indiana; January 12, 1925 – January 14, 1929	Succeeded by Harry G. Leslie
