= Lieutenant Governor of Indiana =

Constitutional office in Indiana, USA

- Seal of Indiana

- Incumbent; Micah Beckwith since January 13, 2025
- Government of Indiana
- Style: Mr Lieutenant Governor
- Term length: 4 years, no term limits
- Inaugural holder: Christopher Harrison; November 7, 1816
- Formation: Constitution of Indiana; 1816
- Succession: First
- Salary: $194,501
- Website: http://www.in.gov/lg/

The lieutenant governor of Indiana is a constitutional office in the US state of Indiana. Republican Micah Beckwith, who assumed office January 13, 2025, is the incumbent. The office holder's constitutional roles are to serve as the president of the Indiana Senate, become acting governor during the incapacity of the governor, and become governor should the incumbent governor resign, die in office, or be impeached and removed from office. Lieutenant governors have succeeded ten governors following their deaths or resignations. The lieutenant governor holds statutory positions, serving as the head of the state agricultural and rural affairs bureaus, and as the chairman of several state committees.

The lieutenant governor is elected on the same election ticket as the governor in a statewide election held every four years, concurrent with United States presidential elections. Should a lieutenant governor die while in office, resign, or succeed to the governorship, the constitution specifies no mechanism by which to fill vacancies in the lieutenant governor's office. Historically, the position has generally remained vacant during such events. The last attempt to fill such a vacancy in 1887 led to the outbreak of violence in the state legislature known as the Black Day of the General Assembly. However, in recent years the governor has appointed a lieutenant governor if a vacancy arises.

== Requirements ==
The position of lieutenant governor was created with the adoption of the first Constitution of Indiana in August 1816. The position was filled by an October election. The position was retained and the current requirements established in the state's second and current constitution adopted in 1851.

To become lieutenant governor, a candidate must have been a United States citizen and lived within Indiana for the period of five consecutive years before the election. The candidate must also be at least thirty years old when sworn into office. The lieutenant governor may not hold any federal office during his term, and must resign from any such position before being eligible to be sworn in as lieutenant governor. Before taking the office, the candidate must swear an oath of office administered by the chief justice of the Indiana Supreme Court, promising to uphold the constitution and laws of Indiana.

== Succession ==
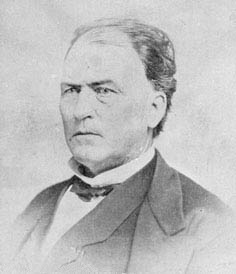
Jesse D. Bright, Lieutenant Governor and US Senator from Indiana; he was exiled from the United States during the American Civil War

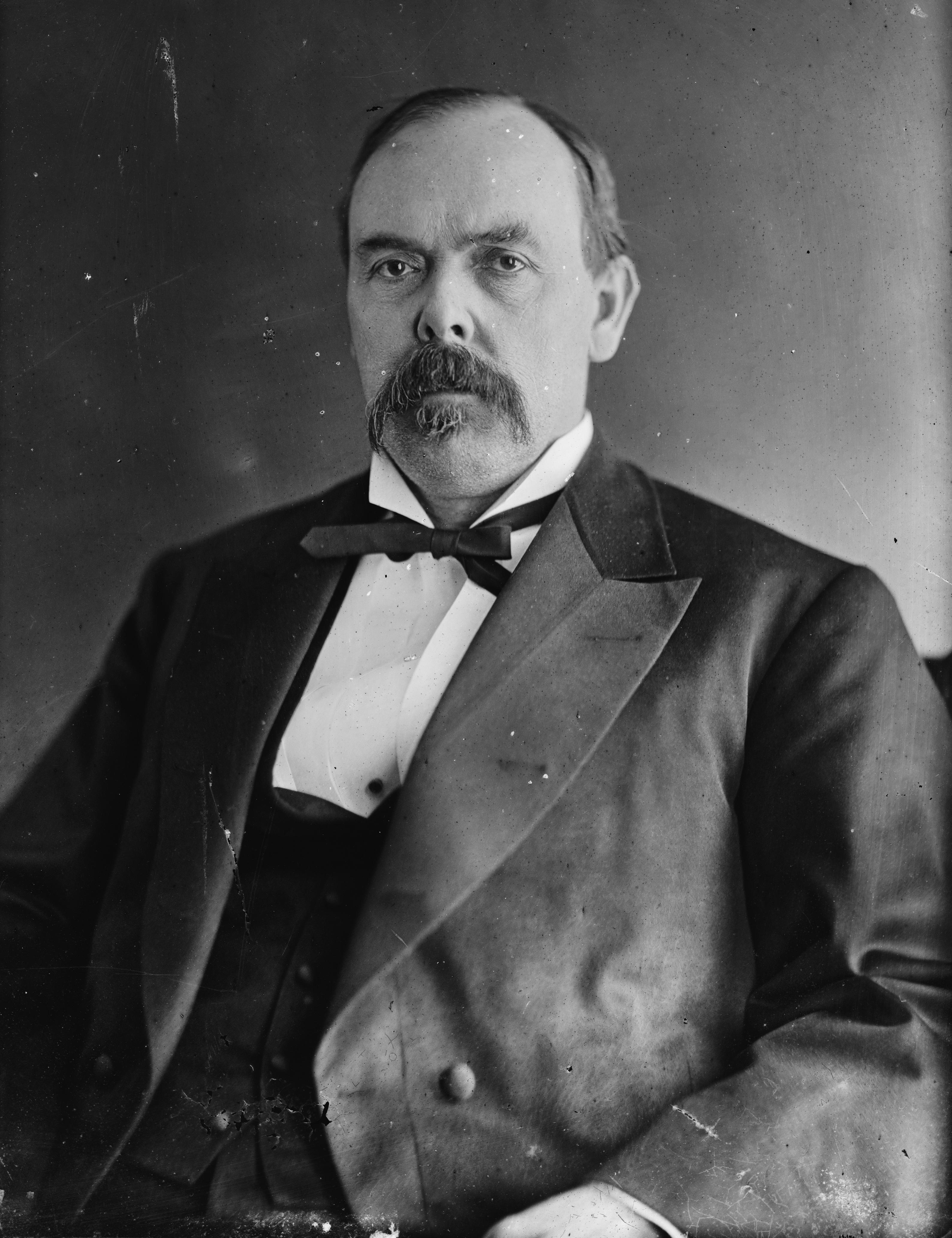
Oliver P. Morton, Lieutenant Governor, Governor, and US Senator from Indiana

The lieutenant governor serves as acting governor when the governor becomes incapacitated. In the state's early history, lieutenant governors would serve as acting governor while the governor was away from the capital. Christopher Harrison was the first lieutenant governor to serve as acting governor while Jonathan Jennings negotiated treaties far from the capital.

If the governor dies in office, becomes permanently incapacitated, resigns, or is impeached, the lieutenant governor becomes governor. In total, ten lieutenant governors become governor by succession. The first occurrence was when Jonathan Jennings resigned to become a congressman and was succeeded by Ratliff Boon.

In the event that both the governorship and lieutenant-governorship are vacant, the constitution stipulates that the Senate president pro tempore becomes governor. Historically, governors appointed the pro tempore to serve as acting lieutenant governor as a formality. This practice ended in the early twentieth century. Although the constitution did not specify a method to fill a vacancy in the lieutenant governorship, an attempt to fill a vacancy occurred in 1887. When the winner of the election attempted to be seated, the Senate erupted into violence known as the Black Day of the General Assembly; the lieutenant governor-elect was sworn in but never seated.

Should the lieutenant governorship become vacant for any reason, including death, resignation, or succession, the governor may nominate a replacement who must be approved by both houses of the General Assembly.

== Authority ==
=== Constitutional ===
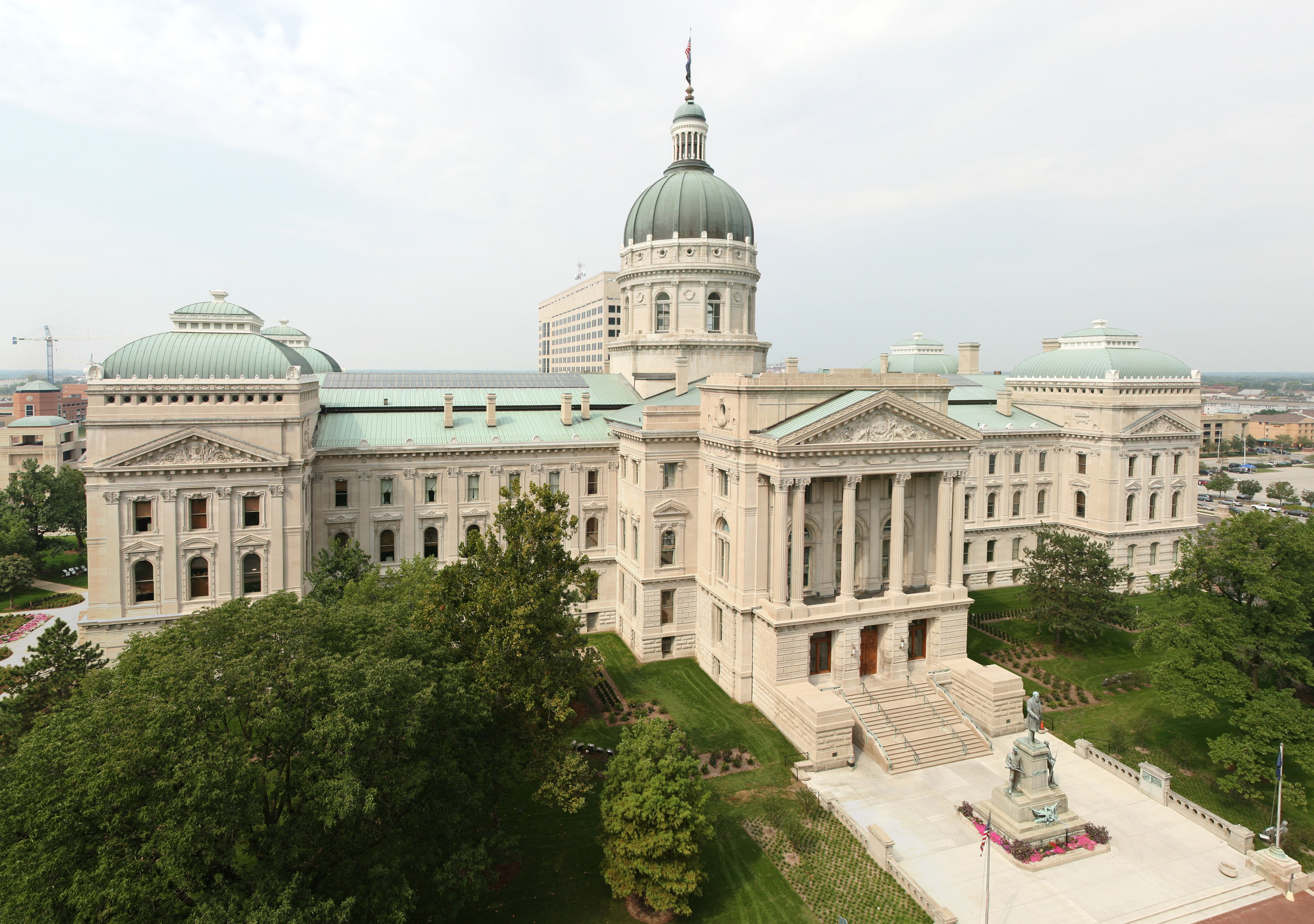
Indiana Statehouse, location of the Lieutenant Governor's office.

The lieutenant governor has two constitutional functions. The primary function is to serve as the president of the Indiana Senate. In the Senate the lieutenant governor is permitted to debate on legislation, introduce legislation, and vote on matters to break ties. As presiding officer in the Senate, lieutenant governors also have partial control over what legislation will be considered, and influence on the legislative calendar. Unless a special session is called by the governor, the Senate meets for no more than 91 days in any two years period, leaving the lieutenant governor free from their senatorial duties in the remainder of the year.

The secondary function is to serve as a successor to the governorship should it become vacant, or act as governor if necessary. If a lieutenant governor should succeed to the governorship, the office of lieutenant governor and president of the Senate become vacant; the duties are taken over by the Senate president pro tempore.

=== Statutory ===
The majority of the powers exercised by the lieutenant governor are statutory and have been assigned by the Indiana General Assembly. The first additional powers granted to the lieutenant governor were added in 1932 when the office holder was made the head of the state's agricultural commission. The office's powers have since expanded to include the chairmanship of the Office of Community and Rural Affairs, the Indiana Housing and Community Development Authority, Office of Energy and Defense Development, and the Office of Tourism Development. As head of the various office and committees, the lieutenant governor controls many patronage positions and is permitted to fill them by appointment. Important positions filled by the lieutenant governor include the members of the Corn Marketing Council, the Main Street Council, Steel Advisory Commission, and the Indiana Film Commission.

In addition to the chairmanship of the committees, the lieutenant governor is also a participating member of the Natural Resources Committee, State Office Building Commission, Air Pollution Control Board, Water Pollution Control Board, and Solid Waste Management Board.

The annual salary of the lieutenant governor is set by the Indiana General Assembly and was $76,000 in 2007.

== List of lieutenant governors of Indiana ==
There have been forty-nine lieutenant governors of Indiana since Indiana became a state in 1816.

Democratic-Republican (3) Democratic (22) Whig (3) Republican (26) Union (1) Independent (1)

#	Image	Lt. Governor	Took office	Left office	Party	Governor	Notes
1		Christopher Harrison	November 7, 1816	December 17, 1818	Democratic-Republican	Jonathan Jennings	(Note: Was acting governor.) (Note: Resigned from office.) (Note: James Beggs was elected Senate President pro tempore by the Senate to fill the vacancy created by the resignation of Christopher Harrison. He held the position until the election of Ratliff Boon (Funk, p. 206).)
2		Ratliff Boon	December 8, 1819	September 12, 1822	Democratic-Republican	Jonathan Jennings	(Note: Was elevated to the governorship during his term.)
3		Ratliff Boon	December 5, 1822	January 30, 1824	Democratic-Republican	William Hendricks	
4		John H. Thompson	December 7, 1825	December 3, 1828	Jacksonian	William Hendricks	(Note: Served two terms.)
5		Milton Stapp	December 3, 1828	December 7, 1831	Independent	James B. Ray	
6		David Wallace	December 7, 1831	December 6, 1837	Whig	Noah Noble	
7		David Hillis	December 6, 1837	December 9, 1840	Whig	David Wallace	
8		Samuel Hall	December 9, 1840	December 6, 1843	Whig	Samuel Bigger	
9		Jesse D. Bright	December 6, 1843	March 4, 1845	Democratic	James Whitcomb	(Note: Became a United States senator.) (Note: Godlove S. Orth, a Whig, was elected Senate President pro tempore by the Senate to fill the vacancy created by the resignation of Jesse B. Bright. He held the position until the election of Paris C. Dunning (Funk, p. 206).)
10		Paris C. Dunning	December 9, 1846	December 26, 1848	Democratic	James Whitcomb	(Note: James G. Read was elected Senate President pro tempore by the Senate to fill the vacancy created by the elevation of Paris C. Dunning to the governorship. He held the position until the election of Jim Lane (Funk, p. 206).)
11		Jim Lane	December 5, 1849	January 10, 1853	Democratic	Joseph A. Wright	
12		Ashbel P. Willard	January 10, 1853	January 12, 1857	Democratic	Joseph A. Wright	
13		Abram A. Hammond	January 12, 1857	October 3, 1860	Democratic	Ashbel P. Willard	(Note: The Senate did not elect a Senate president pro tempore following Hammond's succession as governor and the position remained vacant until the election of Oliver Morton (Funk, p. 206).)
14		Oliver P. Morton	January 14, 1861	January 16, 1861	Republican	Henry S. Lane	
—		John R. Cravens	January 16, 1861	October 9, 1863	Republican	Oliver P. Morton	acting (Note: After Morton's elevation to the governorship, John R. Cravens served as acting lieutenant governor from 1861 to 1863 (Funk, p. 206).) (Note: After the resignation of John R. Cravens, Paris C. Dunning served as acting lieutenant governor from 1863 to 1865 (Funk, p. 206).)
—		Paris C. Dunning	October 9, 1863	January 9, 1865	Democratic	Oliver P. Morton	acting
15		Conrad Baker	January 9, 1865	January 23, 1867	Union	Oliver P. Morton	
16		William Cumback	January 23, 1867	March 27, 1871	Republican	Conrad Baker	(Note: After Conrad Baker's elevation to the governorship, William Cumback served as acting lieutenant governor for the remainder of Baker's term; he was subsequently elected to a full term which began on January 11, 1869.)
—		George W. Friedley	November 13, 1872	January 13, 1873	Republican	Conrad Baker	(Note: Following Cumback's resignation, the office of lieutenant governor was vacant until January 13, 1873 (Funk, 209). There was no president pro tempore of the Senate until November 13, 1872 (Indianapolis Journal, Feb. 22, 1872), when Friedley was elected (Journal of the Indiana State Senate, 6).)
17		Leonidas Sexton	January 13, 1873	January 13, 1877	Republican	Thomas A. Hendricks	
18		Isaac P. Gray	January 13, 1877	November 2, 1880	Democratic	James D. Williams	
—		Fredrick Vieche	November 20, 1880	January 8, 1881	Democratic	Isaac P. Gray	acting (Note: Fredrick Vieche served as acting lieutenant governor following the elevation of Isaac Gray to the governorship until the election of Thomas Hanna.)
19		Thomas Hanna	January 10, 1881	January 12, 1885	Republican	Albert G. Porter	
20		Mahlon Dickerson Manson	January 12, 1885	August 3, 1886	Democratic	Isaac P. Gray	
21		Robert S. Robertson	January 10, 1887	January 13, 1889	Republican	Isaac P. Gray	
–		Alonzo G. Smith	November 8, 1886	January 14, 1889	Democratic	Isaac P. Gray	acting (Note: At the general election in November 1886 both parties entered candidates to fill the vacancy created by the resignation of Mahlon Manson. Robert S. Robertston, Republican, was elected and sworn into office on January 10, 1886. The Democrat-controlled Senate refused to seat him, declaring that the seat was not vacant and the election was invalid. The Senate then elected Alonzo G. Smith to serve as acting lieutenant governor until the election of Ira Chase. The Indiana Supreme Court ordered the senate to seat Robertson, but violence broke out when he attempted to enter the chamber, preventing him from ever taking office (Funk, p. 204).) (Note: Francis M. Griffin served as acting lieutenant governor following the elevation of Ira Chase to the governorship. He served until the election of Mortimer Nye.) (Note: Francis M. Griffin served as acting lieutenant governor following the elevation of Ira Chase to the governorship. He served until the election of Mortimer Nye (Funk, p. 204).)
22		Ira Joy Chase	January 14, 1889	November 24, 1891	Republican	Alvin Peterson Hovey	acting
—		Francis M. Griffith	November 23, 1891	January 9, 1893	Republican	Ira Joy Chase	acting
23		Mortimer Nye	January 9, 1893	January 11, 1897	Democratic	Claude Matthews	
24		William S. Haggard	January 11, 1897	January 14, 1901	Republican	James A. Mount	
25		Newton W. Gilbert	January 14, 1901	January 9, 1905	Republican	Winfield T. Durbin	
26		Hugh Thomas Miller	January 9, 1905	January 11, 1909	Republican	Frank Hanly	
27		Frank J. Hall	January 11, 1909	January 13, 1913	Democratic	Thomas R. Marshall	
28		William P. O'Neill	January 13, 1913	January 8, 1917	Democratic	Samuel M. Ralston	
29		Edgar D. Bush	January 8, 1917	January 10, 1921	Republican	James P. Goodrich	
30		Emmett Forrest Branch	January 10, 1921	April 30, 1924	Republican	Warren T. McCray	
—		James J. Nejdl	April 30, 1924	January 12, 1925	Republican	Warren T. McCray	acting (Note: James J. Nejdl served as acting lieutenant governor following the elevation of Emmett Branch to the governorship until the election of Harold Van Orman.)
31		F. Harold Van Orman	January 12, 1925	January 14, 1929	Republican	Edward L. Jackson	
32		Edgar D. Bush	January 14, 1929	January 9, 1933	Republican	Harry G. Leslie	
33		M. Clifford Townsend	January 9, 1933	January 11, 1937	Democratic	Paul V. McNutt	
34		Henry F. Schricker	January 11, 1937	January 13, 1941	Democratic	M. Clifford Townsend	
35		Charles M. Dawson	January 13, 1941	January 8, 1945	Democratic	Henry F. Schricker	
36		Richard T. James	January 8, 1945	January 10, 1948	Republican	Ralph F. Gates	
37		Rue J. Alexander	April 14, 1948	January 2, 1949	Republican	Henry F. Schricker	
38		John A. Watkins	January 10, 1949	January 12, 1953	Democratic	Henry F. Schricker	
39		Harold W. Handley	January 12, 1953	January 14, 1957	Republican	George N. Craig	
40		Crawford F. Parker	January 14, 1957	January 9, 1961	Republican	Harold W. Handley	
41		Richard O. Ristine	January 9, 1961	January 11, 1965	Republican	Matthew E. Welsh	
42		Robert L. Rock	January 11, 1965	January 13, 1969	Democratic	Roger D. Branigin	
43		Richard E. Folz	January 13, 1969	January 8, 1973	Republican	Edgar Whitcomb	
44		Robert D. Orr	January 8, 1973	January 12, 1981	Republican	Otis R. Bowen	
45		John Mutz	January 12, 1981	January 9, 1989	Republican	Robert D. Orr	
46		Frank O'Bannon	January 9, 1989	January 13, 1997	Democratic	Evan Bayh	
47		Joe Kernan	January 13, 1997	September 13, 2003	Democratic	Frank O'Bannon	
48		Kathy Davis	October 20, 2003	January 10, 2005	Democratic	Joe Kernan	
49		Becky Skillman	January 10, 2005	January 14, 2013	Republican	Mitch Daniels	
50		Sue Ellspermann	January 14, 2013	March 2, 2016	Republican	Mike Pence	(Note: Sue Ellspermann resigned to become president of Ivy Tech Community College.)
51		Eric Holcomb	March 3, 2016	January 9, 2017	Republican	Mike Pence	
52		Suzanne Crouch	January 9, 2017	January 13, 2025	Republican	Eric Holcomb	
53		Micah Beckwith	January 13, 2025		Republican	Mike Braun	

== Bibliography ==
- Funk, Arville (1983) [1969]. A Sketchbook of Indiana History. Rochester, Indiana: Christian Book Press.
- Gugin, Linda C.; St. Clair, James E, eds. (2006). The Governors of Indiana. Indianapolis, Indiana: Indiana Historical Society Press. ISBN 0-87195-196-7.
- "Lieutenant Governors". Indiana Historical Bureau.
- Indiana Chamber (2007). Here's Your Indiana Government. Indiana Chamber of Commerce. ISBN 978-1-883698-79-9.
