= M. Clifford Townsend =

American politician

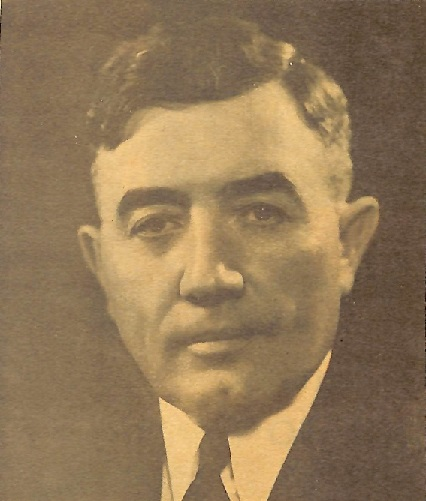
- From Indiana Democratic Party 1938 campaign newspaper

35th Governor of Indiana
- In office January 11, 1937 – January 13, 1941
- Lieutenant: Henry F. Schricker
- Preceded by: Paul V. McNutt
- Succeeded by: Henry F. Schricker

33rd Lieutenant Governor of Indiana
- In office January 9, 1933 – January 13, 1937
- Governor: Paul V. McNutt
- Preceded by: Edgar D. Bush
- Succeeded by: Henry F. Schricker

Member of the Indiana House of Representatives
- In office 1925–1929

Personal details
- Born: Maurice Clifford Townsend; August 11, 1884 Blackford County, Indiana, U.S.
- Died: November 11, 1954 (aged 70) Hartford City, Indiana, U.S.
- Party: Democratic
- Spouse: Nora Adele Harris
- Education: Marion College

Maurice Clifford Townsend (August 11, 1884 – November 11, 1954) was an American politician and the 35th governor of Indiana from 1937 to 1941. During his term, he led relief efforts during and after the Great Flood of 1937.

== Early life ==
Maurice Clifford Townsend was born on a farm in Blackford County, Indiana, to David and Lydia Glancy Townsend on August 11, 1884. He had one sister, Myrtle, and the two were raised on a country farm. He was the great-great-grandson of Eber Townsend (1760–1822) who fought in the Revolutionary War as a volunteer in the New York militia.

After completing high school in 1901, Townsend worked as a teamster in the oil fields during the Indiana Gas Boom, and later in a factory. In 1907, he entered Marion College in Grant County. After working as a teacher for six years to pay for his education, he graduated in 1907. He then taught in the common schools until 1909, when he became the superintendent of Blackford County schools. He remained superintendent there until 1919.

He entered politics as a representative in the Indiana House in 1923. His single term in the legislature was focused mostly on reforming the state's tax code, an issue he worked on up through his term as governor.

From 1925 to 1929, he served as superintendent of Grant County schools. When he began his tenure, he also became a member of the executive committee of the Indiana's Teachers Association.

In 1928 he ran an unsuccessful campaign for Congress but was defeated. Townsend's experience made Paul V. McNutt consider him as a candidate for Lieutenant Governor and helped him to win the nomination at the state's Democratic convention in 1932.

He was elected the 33rd Lieutenant Governor on the Democratic ticket and served from 1933 until 1937. The position of Lieutenant Governor was dramatically altered during his term. Previously, the position received only required active work during legislative sessions, which amounted to sixty days every two years. The salary at the time was only $1,000 (equivalent to US$24,871 in 2025) and a daily stipend when needed to preside over the State Senate. The position was granted significantly more power after the passage of the 1932 Executive Reorganization Act when the lieutenant-governor was made head of the state's agricultural department and assigning him other administrative duties. The change put a large number of patronage jobs under his control.

== Governor ==
Townsend's mother placed his name in nomination for governor at the 1936 Democratic state convention. His nomination though was a tough battle. The Democratic Party was split between three strong faction, with McNutt supporting Townsend, powerful senator Sherman Minton supporting Pleas Greenlee, and the chairman of the state party supporting Kirk McKinney. The fight at the convention was bitter, and a fist fight broke out before the final vote took place. In the end McNutt's control over the party machine determined the nomination in favor of Townsend. The popular McNutt campaigned heavily on Townsend's behalf in the general election. Republicans again made gains in the General Assembly, but Democrats kept the majority and Townsend won the election, defeating Republican Raymond Springer by over 180,000 votes.

Townsend was inaugurated on January 11, 1937. The state was immediately beset with a disaster as the Great Flood of 1937 began. Within a week, every community on the Ohio River was destroyed and hundreds of thousands were homeless. In the early stages, he coordinated evacuation efforts, routing all available trains to carry people to safety as flood waters rose. Thousand of relief workers and the national guard were called out to help rebuild. The disaster remains the second worse to have ever hit the state. Indiana was the only state affected by the flood, and there were no drownings reported. Harry L. Hopkins of the National Relief Administration said, "No state was better managed during the flood than Indiana."

Before the flood relief was completed, a large strike broke out in General Motors factories across the state. Violence broke out in Anderson and the National Guard was called out by Townsend to restore order and protect the factory. The strike prompted Townsend to request the creation of the state Division of Labor to provide voluntary mediation in union strikes. Steel workers in Gary launched a strike in 1937, and the division successfully prevented it from turning violent.

As the end of his term neared, the former state party chairman Frederick Van Nuys, who had been elected Senator again, attempted take control of the party from the McNutt-Townsend faction. The battle was primarily over who would control federal patronage jobs. President Franklin Roosevelt intervened after Van Nuys opposed his plan to stack the United States Supreme Court, and used his own influence to have Van Nuys defeated in his reelection bid. Townsend at first agreed to go along with Roosevelt's plan, but after McNutt decided it would be to harmful to the state party, Townsend changed his mind, much to Roosevelt's chagrin.

In the mid-term elections, Republican took the control of the Indiana House of Representatives, 51 to 49. The Republicans blocked Townsend's proposed new social programs and attempted to roll back many of his predecessor's programs. The Senate blocked the bills from passage, and the session ended in deadlock. Only a few pieces of legislation were passed: the driver's license examination became required by law, pensions for the state's firemen were approved, free textbooks were authorized for public schools and the state ordered school buses to be painted yellow for safety's sake—this last starting a nationwide trend.

== Later life ==
After Townsend left office, he extricated himself from internal politics of the state party and did not involve himself in the selection of his successor. During World War II Townsend used his farm experience in government service, directing the Office of Agricultural War Relations, the Agricultural Conservation and Adjustment Administration, and the Food Production Administration. In 1943 he resigned from federal service and returned to Indiana to manage his farms in Blackford and Grant counties. Townsend was the Democratic nominee for the United States Senate in 1946, but was defeated by William E. Jenner. He died November 11, 1954, from a heart attack, and was buried at the Odd Fellows Cemetery in Hartford City, Indiana.

== See also ==
- List of governors of Indiana

Party political offices
Preceded by Paul V. McNutt	Democratic nominee for Governor of Indiana; 1936	Succeeded by Henry F. Schricker
Preceded by Sherman Minton	Democratic nominee for U.S. Senator from Indiana (Class 1); 1946	Succeeded by Henry F. Schricker
Political offices
Preceded by Edgar D. Bush	Lieutenant Governor of Indiana; January 9, 1933 - January 13, 1937	Succeeded by Henry F. Schricker
Preceded by Paul V. McNutt	Governor of Indiana; January 11, 1937 - January 13, 1941	Succeeded by Henry F. Schricker
