= Emmett Forest Branch =

American politician

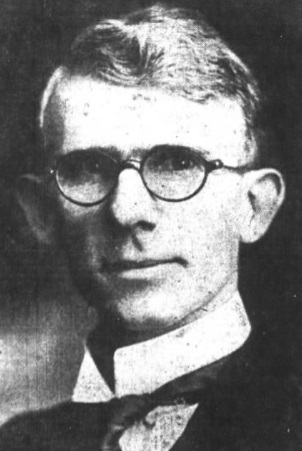
- The Indianapolis News, January 8, 1925

31st Governor of Indiana
- In office April 30, 1924 – January 12, 1925
- Lieutenant: James J. Nejdl (acting)
- Preceded by: Warren T. McCray
- Succeeded by: Edward L. Jackson

30th Lieutenant Governor of Indiana
- In office January 10, 1921 – April 30, 1924
- Governor: Warren T. McCray
- Preceded by: Edgar D. Bush
- Succeeded by: James J. Nejdl as Acting Lieutenant Governor

Speaker of the Indiana House of Representatives
- In office November 7, 1906 – November 4, 1908
- Preceded by: Sydney Wilberforce Cantwell
- Succeeded by: Thomas Michael Honan

Member of the Indiana House of Representatives from the Morgan County district
- In office November 5, 1902 – November 4, 1908
- Preceded by: James M. Bishop
- Succeeded by: Homer Levi McGinnis

Personal details
- Born: May 16, 1874 Martinsville, Indiana, U.S.
- Died: February 23, 1932 (aged 57) Martinsville, Indiana, U.S.
- Party: Republican
- Spouse: Katherine Bain
- Education: Indiana University Bloomington

Military service
- Allegiance: United States
- Branch/service: United States Army
- Years of service: 1898–1901; 1903–1908; 1916–1917
- Rank: Lieutenant Colonel
- Unit: 158th Regiment Indiana Infantry
- Commands: 151st Infantry, 165th Depot Brigade
- Battles/wars: Spanish–American War; Mexican Border War; World War I

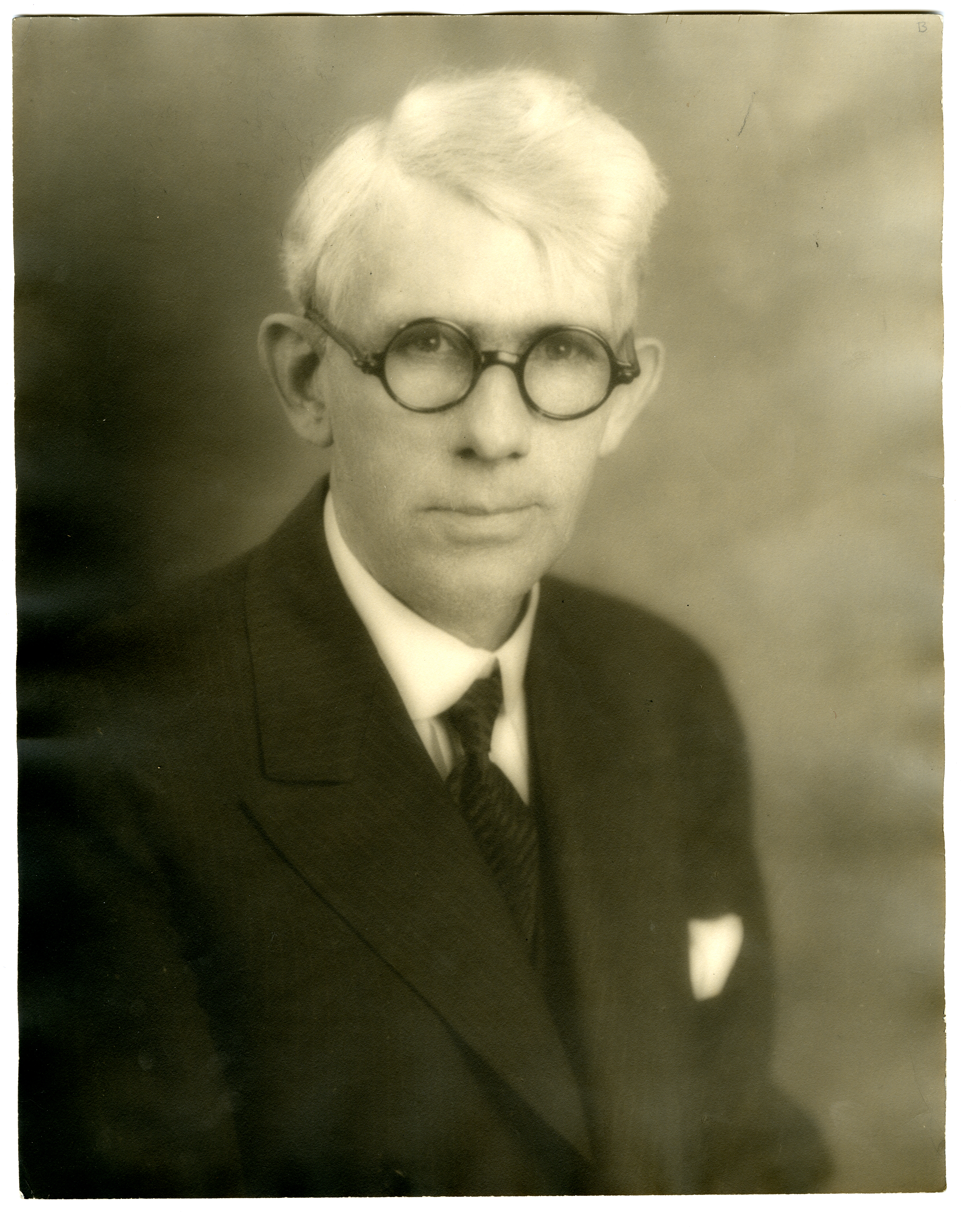
Emmett Forest Branch

Emmett Forest Branch (May 16, 1874 – February 23, 1932) was an American banker, politician and the 31st governor of the U.S. state of Indiana from 1924 to 1925, serving the remainder of the term of Warren T. McCray, who had resigned from office after being convicted for mail fraud. Branch's brief term focused on continuing the reforms and projects of his predecessor.

== Early life ==
Branch was born in Martinsville, Indiana the oldest of his four siblings Olive Branch, Leafy Branch, and Frank Oaks Branch. His parents were Elliot and Alice Parks Branch. His father was a Republican politician who had served in state government for several decades. His grandfather and great-grandfather had also been involved in state politics and served as state senators. He attended Indiana University Bloomington and graduated in 1896, where he played on the school's championship-winning baseball team. He would be the first Indiana University graduate to become governor. After college, he studied law with his uncle Judge M.H. Parks. He was admitted to the bar in 1899 and established a law practice in Martinsville.

During the Spanish–American War, he enlisted in Company K of the 158th Regiment eventually rising to the rank of First Lieutenant. After the war he entered politics and was elected to the Indiana House of Representatives, serving three terms from 1903 to 1909. During World War I, he returned to the army as a lieutenant colonel of the 151st Infantry. He later commanded the 165th Depot Brigade at Camp Travis in Texas and served as part of the forces guarding the Mexican border in 1916 and 1917.

== Politics ==
=== Legislator ===
After returning from the army, he opened a law office in Martinsville and married Katherine Bain, the daughter of a prominent newspaper owner. The couple had one son. In 1902, he was elected to the Indiana House of Representatives and served for three terms. He was elected Speaker of the House in 1907 and 1908. While Speaker, he ended the omnibus practice that allowed multiple bills to be combined and passed without debate.

In 1910, he returned to his law practice where he remained until nominated to run for Lieutenant Governor in 1920 and won the election. As President of the Senate, he took part in debate and supported several controversial measures including banning gambling and liquor sales on Memorial Day. When legislation to ban teaching the German language in public was introduced, the Senate edged on violence and order was restored only after Branch beat his gavel so hard on the podium that he broke both the podium and the gavel, causing the chamber to burst into laughter.

=== Governor ===
Governor Warren T. McCray had been having a behind the scenes battle with the Indiana Ku Klux Klan and became involved in questionable loan transactions, which the Klan exposed as a scandal to force him out of office. McCray was convicted of mail fraud and sentenced to ten years in prison, forcing him to leave office on April 30, 1924. The same day, Branch was sworn in as governor. A close friend of McCray, he cried while taking the oath of office and later said that everything was so "sudden and surprising."

Branch's term was brief, and he focused on continuing the projects and reforms McCray had begun, including expanding the state highway system, completing the new state prison, and expanding the school for the blind. He oversaw the completion of the Riley Hospital for Children. A month after taking office, a boxing match was held in Michigan City. Prize fighting was illegal in Indiana, and protesters demanded that for the governor to shut down the match. Branch secretly ordered the militia mobilized and put on standby, and sent a general to attend the match to see if he could detect any gambling going on. The general reported that nothing of note happened, and the match was held without incident.

== Later life ==
After his term as governor ended, he retired to Martinsville, where he practiced law and managed his business interests as President of the Branch Grain and Seed Company and a major stockholder in the Martinsville Trust Company. He also owned several large farms in Morgan County. In 1929, he was appointed by Governor Harry G. Leslie to manage the state armory, a post he held until his death from a heart attack on February 23, 1932. He is buried in the Hilldale Cemetery.

== See also ==
- List of governors of Indiana

Political offices
Preceded by Edgar D. Bush	Lieutenant Governor of Indiana; January 10, 1921 - April 30, 1924	Succeeded by James J. Nejdl; Acting Lieutenant Governor
Preceded by Warren T. McCray	Governor of Indiana; April 30, 1924 - January 12, 1925	Succeeded by Ed Jackson
