= Ila Marshall Cronin =

American politician (1893–1955)

Member of the Ohio House of Representatives from the Columbiana County district
- In office January 1, 1931-December 31, 1934

Personal details
- Born: May 27, 1893 East Liverpool, Ohio, U.S.
- Died: February 23, 1955 (aged 61) Columbus, Ohio, U.S.
- Party: Republican
- Spouse: Daniel M. Cronin

Ila Marshall Cronin (May 27, 1893 – February 23, 1955) was a former member of the Ohio House of Representatives from Columbiana County.
