= Edgar D. Bush =

American politician (1873–1949)

Edgar Bush

32nd Lieutenant Governor of Indiana
- In office January 14, 1929 – January 9, 1933
- Governor: Harry G. Leslie
- Preceded by: F. Harold Van Orman
- Succeeded by: M. Clifford Townsend

29th Lieutenant Governor of Indiana
- In office January 8, 1917 – January 10, 1921
- Governor: James P. Goodrich
- Preceded by: William P. O'Neill
- Succeeded by: Emmett F. Branch

Personal details
- Born: February 3, 1873 Washington County, Indiana, U.S.
- Died: July 21, 1949 (aged 76) New Albany, Indiana, U.S
- Party: Republican
- Education: Indiana University

Edgar D. Bush (February 3, 1873 – July 21, 1949) was a politician from the U.S. state of Indiana. Between 1917 and 1921 and again from 1929 through 1933 he served as Lieutenant Governor of Indiana.

== Life ==
Edgar Bush was born in Washington County, Indiana. Bush moved with his parents to Salem, Indiana and went to the public schools. In 1895, Bush graduated from Indiana University. He was a high school principal for the North Anderson Township High School in Anderson, Indiana. Bush was involved in the bonding business. He joined the Republican Party and in 1916 he was elected to the office of the Lieutenant Governor of Indiana. He served in this position between 8 January 1917 and 10 January 1921 when his term ended. In this function he was the deputy of Governor James P. Goodrich and he presided over the Indiana Senate. Between 14 January 1929 and 9 January 1933 he held the same offices again under Governor Harry G. Leslie.

Edgar Bush died on July 21, 1949, in New Albany, Indiana.

Political offices
Preceded by William P. O'Neill	Lieutenant Governor of Indiana; 1917–1921;	Succeeded by Emmett Forrest Branch;
Preceded by F. Harold Van Orman	Lieutenant Governor of Indiana; 1929–1933;	Succeeded by M. Clifford Townsend
