= Warren T. McCray =

American politician

Warren Terry McCray

30th Governor of Indiana
- In office January 10, 1921 – April 30, 1924
- Lieutenant: Emmett Forrest Branch
- Preceded by: James P. Goodrich
- Succeeded by: Emmett Forrest Branch

Personal details
- Born: February 4, 1865 Brook, Indiana, U.S.
- Died: December 19, 1938 (aged 73) Kentland, Indiana, U.S.
- Party: Republican
- Spouse: Ella M. Ade

Warren Terry McCray (February 4, 1865 – December 19, 1938) was the 30th governor of the U.S. state of Indiana from 1921 to 1924.

He came into conflict with the growing influence of the Indiana Ku Klux Klan after vetoing legislation they supported. His personal estate was threatened with bankruptcy during his term and he solicited loans via the mail in order to help maintain his home and took a questionable loan from the State Department of Agriculture. The Indiana attorney general was a Klan member and used the opportunity to bring a suit against the governor for embezzlement for which he was found not guilty.

Immediately after the embezzlement case failed, a new case was launched in federal court claiming he had solicited private loans in a fraudulent way. He resigned from office after his conviction for mail fraud and served three years in federal prison before being paroled in 1927 and pardoned by President Herbert Hoover in 1930.

== Early life ==
=== Family and background ===
Warren Terry McCray was born near Brook, Indiana, on February 4, 1865, to Greenberry Ward and Martha (Galey) McCray. His friends and family called him "Warnie". He had two sisters, Annie Eliza and Fannie. At age five he moved to Kentland, Indiana where he grew up attending a local public school. His father and uncle formed a successful livery business there. From an early age, McCray was encouraged to find a way to make money, and began growing vegetables and selling them door to door as a young boy. As he grew older he began taking care of cattle of townspeople who did not have enough land for them to graze. For a fee, he drove the cattle into a pasture outside of town during the day and returned them in the evening.

In April 1874, his uncle died and his father took on new partners. They soon purchased the Discount and Deposit Bank of Kentland and began to accumulate considerable wealth. As a teenager, McCray took a job in the bank as a bookkeeper. After completing high school in 1882 his father offered to send him to college, but the young McCray choose to instead remain working at the bank. By 1885 he had grown tired of his banking job, and decided to go into business on his own. With a friend, Willis Kirkpatrick, he purchased a town grocery store which was immediately very profitable. He used his income from the store to invest in railroad and mining stock, but mostly to buy land. He also made a significant investment in grain elevators and became President of the National Grain Dealers Association.

McCray soon owned a large tract of quality farmland surrounding a large pond outside of Kentland which he named Orchard Lake. He married Ella Ade, the daughter of one of his father's business partners and sister of writer George Ade, on June 15, 1892. The couple had four children, although one died as an infant. McCray became interested in breeding cattle and began building a herd of specialized breeds. His reputation in the cattle community grew rapidly and he established a show barn and auction house and began selling his quality bred cattle, quickly growing his fortune.

=== Local politics ===
McCray became involved in local civics organizations and served on the country school board for one term in 1890. A devastating fire struck Kentland a few years later, and the county placed him in charge of overseeing several projects to rebuilding the town. He gained a reputation for getting things done quickly and cost effectively, and ran for a seat on the town council the following year. There, he successfully advocated the modernization of the town by paving the roads, building an electric plant, installing street lighting, building safer railroad crossings, and several other projects. The tax increases needed to pay for the projects turned out to be too much, and he was voted out of office after one term.

His activities gained him notice by the state party leaders who helped him to gain a seat on the state committee in the summer of 1896. He traveled to Washington D.C. in 1901 to attend the inauguration of President William McKinley and came back convinced he should pursue politics. The same year he was appointed by Governor Winfield T. Durbin as a trustee of the Northern Hospital for the Insane, serving as treasurer. He remained on the board for twelve years. In 1912, he was appointed to the State Board of Agriculture, and became President of the board in 1915. His success at implementing reforms as a board member helped his popularity in the state.

=== State politics ===
McCray decided to run for governor in the 1916 Republican primary, but was defeated by the well connected former state party chairman, James P. Goodrich. McCray returned to his board duties, which expanded as World War I broke out. Goodrich appointed him Chairman of the Food Conservation Committee of Indiana and a member of the United States Live Stock Advisory Committee to help ensure adequate army supplies and rationing during the war. In 1922 he became Chairman of the Corn Belt Advisory Committee of the War Finance Corporation which sought government assistance for farmers. McCray was also very involved with the Red Cross and led several fund raising drives to help the organization.

In 1920 McCray considered running for governor in the Republican primary again, but decided against it and to instead support Will H. Hays in his run. Hays, however, announced he would not be running and instead backed McCray. In the primary, he ran against five other candidates, who attacked him primarily over his war record, as some Republicans were not supportive of the war effort, and for his business practices. The charges proved ineffective, and McCray won the primary defeating his closest competitor by over 50,000 votes.

== Governor ==
=== Reforms ===
In the general election, McCray was opposed by Democratic congressman Carleton B. McCulloch. McCulloch was a war veteran and a doctor and the campaign focused largely on the progressive agenda. The election was highly contested and remains the election with highest voter turnout in state history, most polling places having a turnout near 95%. The election was a landslide for Republicans across the board, as they increased majorities in both houses of the Indiana General Assembly.

McCray came to office and in his inaugural address he all but declared an end to the Progressive Era, stating that people demanded "a season of government economy and a period of legislative inaction and rest." He and the Republican majority in the General Assembly began rolling back several key regulatory laws and attempted to cut back on government spending. McCray focused attention on what he considered the useful and necessary state institutions and undertook an expansion of the education system by building dozens of new schools, constructing the first new state prisons in several decades, enlarging state hospitals, and building a new state reformatory for juvenile delinquents. McCray began laying out plans for a grander state highway system to better accommodate the automobiles which were becoming commonplace. Among the roads he approved creation of was the Lincoln Highway. To fund the road projects, the state introduced its first gasoline tax.

=== Ku Klux Klan ===
The Indiana Ku Klux Klan had been rising in power over the past decade in Indiana. Although it was unknown to McCray at the time, over half the members of the Indiana General Assembly were klansmen. Several members of the administration were also klansmen including Indiana Secretary of State Edward L. Jackson. In 1921, the General Assembly passed a bill to approve a "Klan Day" at the state fair, complete with cross-burnings and other Klan trappings. McCray promptly vetoed the bill, angering Klan leaders.

The Klan gained even more influence in the government in the following year, and Edward Jackson granted the Klan a state charter and officially recognized their organization. McCray was angry with Jackson over the action, and demanded it be rescinded and threatened to take the measure to court, claiming that no organization could receive a charter unless its leaders would reveal themselves and sign the charter. Grand Dragon D.C. Stephenson ordered Jackson to offer McCray a bribe to change his mind. Jackson offered McCray US$10,000 if he would fill several public offices with Klan members. McCray, a millionaire, declined the bribe and was offended. The dealing was behind the scenes and not made public.

=== Loan scandal ===
Land values in Indiana collapsed during the early 1920s and severely hurt McCray's financial position because of his large involvement in land speculation. Although he owned nearly $3 million in assets, he was faced with bankruptcy, but was disturbed at the thought of losing his beloved farm. He took a loan from the State Agricultural Board for $155,000 and deposited into his personal account to cover his debts. He then began soliciting loans from banks by creating fake promissory notes and using them as collateral. Bank officials later claimed that they were coerced by the governor, who hinted that he would remove state deposits if they did not grant him the loans.

Klan members soon found out about McCray's dealings and decided to use the situation to force him out of office. The Indiana attorney general brought McCray up on charges of embezzlement regarding the loan he took from the agricultural board. By then, however, he had already repaid the loan to the board with the help of several friends. The case ended in a hung jury on April 11, 1924. On April 21, he was brought up on mail fraud charges after it was alleged he had mailed the fake promissory notes to several banks. During the trial, he admitted his entire scheme but declared he intended to repay all of the debts and had no criminal intentions. He was soon convicted and sentenced to serve ten years in prison, and he resigned on April 30 and was promptly arrested. The same day, Lieutenant Governor Emmett Forrest Branch was sworn in as governor. A close friend of McCray, he cried while taking the oath of office and later said that everything was so "sudden and surprising."

== Later life ==
After serving three years in the federal penitentiary in Atlanta, Georgia, he was paroled and returned home in 1927. While in prison, the Indiana Klan fell apart as their schemes were revealed by the Grand Dragon after he was convicted of the rape and murder of Madge Oberholtzer. McCray resumed his business, which had recovered and repaid his loans though he remained reclusive in his home. When Republican party leaders informed U.S. President Herbert Hoover in 1930 of the Klan's role in McCray's conviction, he received a presidential pardon. McCray remained on his farm where he died on December 19, 1938. He was buried in Fairlawn Cemetery in Kentland, Indiana.

== Electoral history ==
Indiana gubernatorial election, 1920
Party	Candidate	Votes	%
Republican	Warren T. McCray	683,253	54.6
Democratic	Carleton B. McCulloch	515,252	41.2

== See also ==
- List of governors of Indiana
- List of people pardoned or granted clemency by the president of the United States

Party political offices
Preceded by James P. Goodrich	Republican nominee for Governor of Indiana; 1920	Succeeded by Edward L. Jackson
Political offices
Preceded by James P. Goodrich	Governor of Indiana; January 10, 1921 – April 30, 1924	Succeeded by Emmett Forrest Branch
