= Harry G. Leslie =

American politician

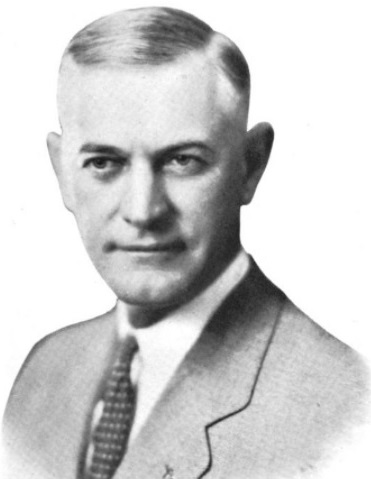
- 1929 frontispiece of Leslie's inaugural message

33rd Governor of Indiana
- In office January 14, 1929 – January 9, 1933
- Lieutenant: Edgar D. Bush
- Preceded by: Edward L. Jackson
- Succeeded by: Paul V. McNutt

Speaker of the Indiana House of Representatives
- In office 1925–1929
- Preceded by: Raymond Charles Morgan
- Succeeded by: James Merril Knapp

Member of the Indiana House of Representatives from Tippecanoe County and Warren County
- In office 1923–1929
- Preceded by: Russell Kenneth Bedgood
- Succeeded by: Roy C. Street

Personal details
- Born: April 6, 1878 West Lafayette, Indiana, U.S.
- Died: December 10, 1937 (aged 59) Miami, Florida, U.S.
- Party: Republican
- Spouse: Martha Morgan Pierce
- Education: Purdue University; Indiana Law School

Harry Guyer Leslie (April 6, 1878 – December 10, 1937) was an American politician and Indiana Republican Party member, speaker of the state house and the 33rd governor of the state. His term as governor was marked by the start of the Great Depression.

== Early life ==
=== Family and education ===
Harry G. Leslie was born in West Lafayette, Indiana, on April 6, 1878, to Daniel and Mary Burkhart Leslie. His father was a local politician and served a chief of police for the town. While he was still a boy, his family moved into the country outside of the town. He attended public schools and worked delivering groceries as a teenager. In 1898 he was elected town clerk, a year after he graduated.

He soon enrolled in the recently constructed Purdue University where he was a member of the Sigma Pi fraternity and Acacia fraternity. While at Purdue, Leslie was captain of both the school's football and baseball teams and became one of the school's "immortal" players. As one of the school's star players, his team was on course to win the state championship in 1903. On October 31 he and his teammates took a train from Lafayette to Indianapolis to a match against Indiana University. As the train neared the 18th Street crossing in Indianapolis, it collided with another train, and Leslie's coach was shattered. One member of the team miraculously landed on his feet and was unharmed after being thrown out a window. The other eighteen boys, including Leslie, were pronounced dead at the scene and taken to the morgue.

A few hours later at the morgue, as the morticians prepared to embalm his body, they discovered he still had a pulse and immediately rushed him to the hospital. Barely alive, he needed several operations and edged on death for several weeks. His recovery was slow, but he eventually regained his health, although he walked with the aid of a cane for the remainder of his life. He returned to school at the end of 1904 and after another year he graduated. His survival of the "Purdue Wreck" received significant attention across the state and he became a famous folk hero.

In 1904, Leslie founded the Purdue College Republicans. For a number of years in the 1990s and early 2000s, the Purdue chapter held a "Leslie Day" celebration and fundraiser in his honor.

Leslie graduated from the Indiana Law School in 1907. He opened a law office in Lafayette the year he graduated and took a position at a local high school coaching football. There he met Martha Morgan, whom he married on August 16, 1910, and by whom he had three sons, Jack, Richard, and Robert. Leslie became involved in local politics and was elected as a Republican Tippecanoe County treasurer in 1912. He purchased a farm in 1914, but disliking the labor, he sold the farm and bought stock in a local bank at which he served as president until 1924.

== Political career ==
=== Speaker of the House ===
In 1923 Leslie, aided by his popularity, was elected to represent Tippecanoe and Warren County in the Indiana House of Representatives. He became known for his down-to-earth style of speaking, and quickly made many allies in the body. He was reelected twice, and served through 1929. In 1925 he was elected Speaker of the House, and remained in that position until he left the body. His term as Speaker was dominated by the Indiana Ku Klux Klan. Their leader was arrested and convicted of rape and murder in 1925, and over the next two years many other Klansman were exposed and forced out of office on a host of charges—including nearly half the members of the General Assembly. The Klan had supported him in his bid for the speakership primarily because they opposed his rival candidate. Leslie fought the Klan block on several issues, including committee assignments, legislation aimed at eliminating Catholic schools, and other issues.

Leslie was pleased with the Grand Dragon's conviction and the collapse in Klan power. He personally believed he was innocent of the charges but thought he deserved prison because of his many unknown crimes. Among the causes Leslie championed was the creation of the Riley Children's Hospital in Indianapolis.

=== Governor ===
Leslie ran for the governor's nomination in the 1928 Republican primary. Among the five candidates, no one took a majority and the nomination went to the state convention. Leslie won on the fifth ballot and defeated the Democratic major of Indianapolis, Frank C. Dailey, and was elected with 51.3% if the vote. He was the state's fifth consecutive Republican governor.

One of his first acts as governor was to support legislation to repeal the state's 1915 primary election laws, and return candidate selections to state conventions. The measure was approved in 1929, and much to the disappointment of the Klan. The first part of Leslie's term was a period of economic growth and he hosted several high-profile events, including the National Governors Association, a visit by President Herbert Hoover, Charles Lindbergh, and other famous guests.

The Great Depression began in 1929, and was complicated by a drought in the state. He instituted some relief measures, but largely did nothing significant believing that the Depression would soon end. In 1932 he called a special session of the General Assembly to lower taxes. Among the relief legislation passed by the General Assembly was Indiana's first old-age pension act, but Leslie vetoed it. As the Depression continued, Leslie decided more needed to be done. He began hiring unemployed workers to work on state road projects. He also advocated that his program be duplicated by the federal government, and his plan was soon implemented as the WPA. Among Leslie's other projects was continuing to grow the state park system.

== Later years ==
Following his governorship Leslie became a founder, and eventually the president, of Standard Life Insurance Company in Indianapolis. Leslie enjoyed humor and among his close friends were George Ade and Will Rogers. While visiting Ade in Miami, Leslie died unexpectedly from heart disease on December 10, 1937. His remains were returned to Indianapolis where he lay in state before being moved to Lafayette for a funeral and burial.

== See also ==
- List of governors of Indiana

Party political offices
Preceded by Edward L. Jackson	Republican nominee for Governor of Indiana; 1928	Succeeded by Raymond S. Springer
Political offices
Preceded by Ed Jackson	Governor of Indiana; January 14, 1929 – January 9, 1933	Succeeded by Paul V. McNutt
