= James P. Goodrich =

American politician (1864–1940)

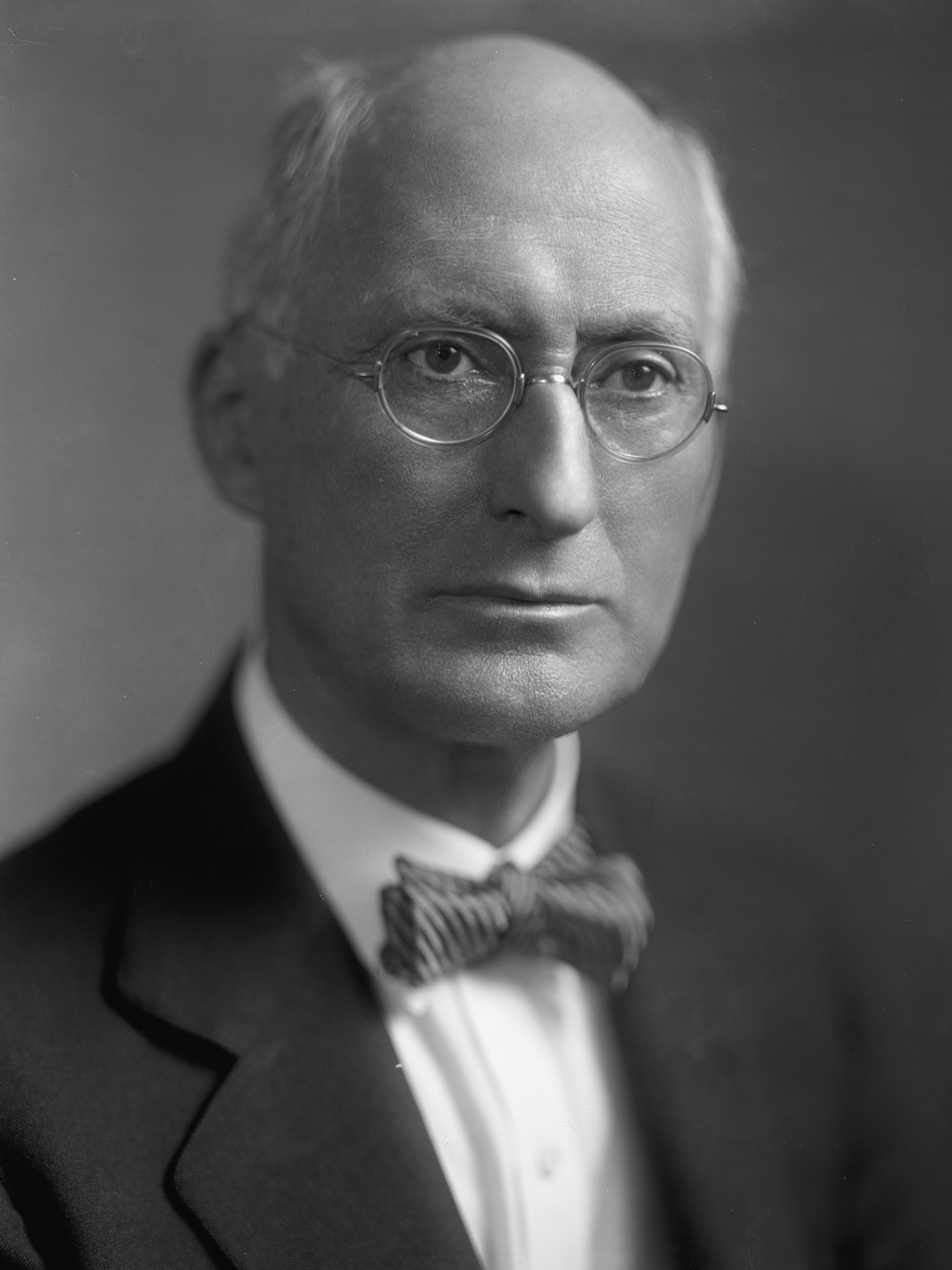
- Goodrich, 1905–1940

29th Governor of Indiana
- In office January 8, 1917 – January 10, 1921
- Lieutenant: Edgar D. Bush
- Preceded by: Samuel M. Ralston
- Succeeded by: Warren T. McCray

Personal details
- Born: James Putnam Goodrich; February 18, 1864 Winchester, Indiana, U.S.
- Died: August 15, 1940 (aged 76) Winchester, Indiana, U.S.
- Party: Republican
- Spouse: Cora Frist
- Children: Pierre F. Goodrich

James Putnam Goodrich (February 18, 1864 – August 15, 1940) was an American politician and member of the Republican Party who served as the 29th governor of Indiana from 1917 to 1921. His term focused on reforming the operations of the state government and overseeing the state's contributions to World War I. He nearly died twice during his term, and spent a considerable time bedridden. Following his term as governor, he became increasingly wealthy from his business interests and owned a controlling share in many companies.

== Early life ==
=== Family and background ===
James Putnam Goodrich was born on February 18, 1864, in Winchester, Indiana, the son of John Baldwin and Elizabeth Edger Goodrich. His father was an attorney who suffered from tuberculosis; he died in 1872. Goodrich attended public schools and intended to enter the U.S. Naval Academy. He earned an appointment to the school, but a severe hip injury incurred after falling from a tree ended his prospect for a military career, and he had to decline the offer.

Goodrich taught in Randolph County public schools for two years to save money for college. He then enrolled in DePauw University, where he was a member of Phi Kappa Psi fraternity. In college he became friends with Albert J. Beveridge who influenced him to be involved in politics. After attending college for two years, he was forced to quit due to a lack of funds. He then began to study law with Enos Watson, the father of his classmate James E. Watson.

=== Party leader ===
Admitted to the bar in 1887, Goodrich practiced law in Winchester and quickly gained prominence in Republican politics. He was involved in a variety of organizations including the Knights of Labor, The Grange, Knights of Pythias, and the Republican Party. In 1897 he became chairman of the Randolph County Republican Party and was later elevated to serve as state chairman from 1901 to 1910 and a national committeeman from 1912 to 1916. His time in party leadership was difficult for him as the party was wracked by a growing internal division over various progressive agenda items. Charles W. Fairbanks was trying to lead the party to the right, while Albert J. Beveridge was trying to pull the party to the left. Despite Goodrich's attempts to heal the division, the conflict between the two men split the party in 1912, as the progressive wing left to form a new party.

In 1910, he moved his law practice to Indianapolis. His investments in farms, grain elevators, coal mines and banks made him wealthy. For the next five years he spent his time working in his law practice and overseeing his business interests. He returned to active politics again in 1915 when he announced he would run for governor. Indiana had just begun implementing its new primary method of electing candidates, and removing candidate selection by convention. He defeated Warren T. McCray and Quincy Alden Myers by more than 50,000 votes to win the nomination.

== Governor ==
=== Tax reform ===
In the 1916 general election, the gubernatorial campaign focused primarily on prohibition and the tax reforms of previous administrations. Following a tight race, Goodrich came out on top, defeating his chief opponent, Democrat John A. M. Adair, by a margin of 12,771, from nearly 700,000 votes cast. On assuming office, Goodrich's stated his primary goal was to bring "efficiency and economy" to government. At the time, almost all of the state's revenue came from property taxes, which was seen as unfairly targeting farmers and rural areas of the state. In 1917, Goodrich tried to have a constitutional convention called to amend the Constitution of Indiana to allow excise taxes to be imposed.

Opponents of the tax lobbied the Indiana General Assembly to kill the excise tax bills. The General Assembly approved the constitutional convention but the opponents took the measure to court. The Indiana Supreme Court ruled that the legislature had no constitutional authority to call a convention, and that a convention could only be called if approved by popular vote. Earlier court decisions had stated the legislature also had no power to amend the constitution, effectively creating a narrow and difficult path for amendment. The decision ended the attempted imposition of new taxes but started a movement that succeeded in later years.

Although Goodrich was not successful in having excise taxes legalized, he did succeed in having legislation passed in 1919 to standardize property tax assessments across the state, and to grant the State Board of Tax Commissioners power to override local assessments. This effectively led to higher property values being assessed on city properties, thereby ensuring the rural areas of the state no longer contributed the majority of the state's revenues.

=== World War I ===
Goodrich pursued several measures to reform the civil service in Indiana. He began by attempting to eliminate patronage. Initially, numerous positions were eliminated by not filling them. His plans, however, were thwarted by the need to grow the state government to manage the recruitment for World War I, which the United States entered in 1917. During the war, Indiana contributed over 130,000 soldiers, which was the state's largest deployment of troops since the American Civil War. At least 3,354 Hoosier soldiers were killed or died from disease during World War I. As a percentage of population, this was higher than any other state. In his endeavors to sell war bonds, Goodrich proved to be extremely successful, leading other states to copy his techniques.

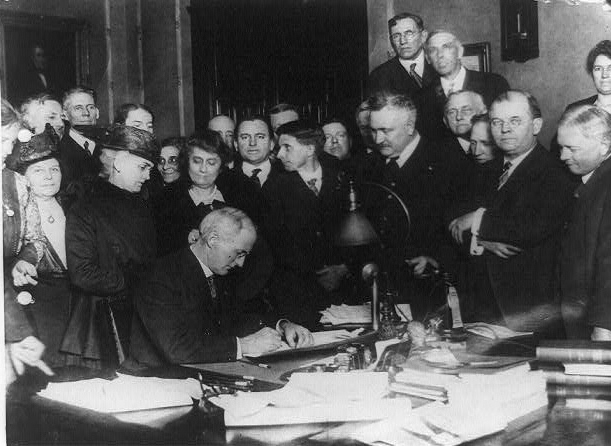
Governor James P. Goodrich signs the Indiana prohibition act, 1917.

In August 1917, Goodrich contracted typhoid after touring a prison in northern Indiana. The sickness left him bedridden for two months, and bordering on death. He was nursed back to health at Indianapolis Methodist Hospital. However, he did not return to the statehouse until November. As a result, he had to deal with several major issues, including coal shortages, working from home. Goodrich also created a commission led by Will Hays to assist him in organizing and directing the state's resources.

In the spring of 1918, when Goodrich was driving home after attending a military send-off, his vehicle was struck by a streetcar. The serious accident caused bone fractures to his hip, skull, ribs, and collarbone. He was again near death, but survived. The accident left Goodrich greatly weakened, and he was forced to walk with a cane for the rest of his life.

=== Amendments ===
During 1919, the United States Congress passed the Eighteenth Amendment to the United States Constitution, banning the sale of liquor, and the Nineteenth Amendment to the United States Constitution, granting women the right to vote. At the passage of each amendment, Goodrich called a special one-day legislative session to have the amendments ratified by the state. When he signed the 18th Amendment into law, Indiana became the final state needed to add it to the federal constitution, beginning national prohibition. Among Goodrich's other accomplishments in office were the creation of a state highway commission, creation of a department of conservation on the heels of the development of state parks (at the behest of his close friend Richard Lieber), and approval for the creation of the Indiana World War Memorial. He called a one-day session of the legislature on January 16, 1920, to ratify the Women's Suffrage Amendment to the United States Constitution.

== Later life ==
In 1920, Goodrich was Indiana's favorite son candidate for the Republican nomination for president, losing to Senator Warren G. Harding. As president, Harding appointed Goodrich to the Russian Relief Commission. Goodrich made four trips to Russia, then governed by the Bolshevik regime of Vladimir Lenin, and gained a reputation as one of America's best-informed observers of conditions there. Goodrich also served in Herbert Hoover's American Relief Administration and on the St. Lawrence Waterway Commission. He remained active in Republican Party politics and made large donations from his personal fortune to Wabash College in Crawfordsville, Indiana, where he served on the board of trustees.

He became increasingly wealthy in his later life from his business investments. He successfully founded a business empire that lasted nearly a century. By the time of his death he owned a major stake in Central Newspapers, and held controlling interests in the Indiana Telephone Company, Goodrich Brothers' Company, City Securities and a host of smaller businesses.

He died on August 15, 1940, at the Randolph County Hospital in Winchester, Indiana, after suffering a cerebral hemorrhage. He is buried in Fountain Park Cemetery in Winchester. Goodrich Hall at Wabash College was named in his honor.

== Electoral history ==
Indiana gubernatorial election, 1916
Party	Candidate	Votes	%
Republican	James P. Goodrich	337,831	47.8
Democratic	John A. M. Adair	325,060	46.0
Prohibition	William Hickman	16,401	2.3
Progressive	Frank Hanly	7,067	1

== See also ==
- List of governors of Indiana

Party political offices
Preceded by Winfield T. Durbin	Republican nominee for Governor of Indiana; 1916	Succeeded by Warren T. McCray
Political offices
Preceded by Samuel M. Ralston	Governor of Indiana; January 8, 1917 - January 10, 1921	Succeeded by Warren T. McCray
