= William L. Taylor (Indiana politician) =

American lawyer and politician (1850–1940)

17th Indiana Attorney General
- In office November 18, 1898 – January 1, 1903
- Governor: James A. Mount, Winfield T. Durbin
- Preceded by: William A. Ketcham
- Succeeded by: Charles W. Miller

William Lamborn Taylor (July 16, 1850 – November 8, 1940) was an American lawyer and politician who served as the seventeenth Indiana Attorney General from November 18, 1898, to January 1, 1903.

== Biography ==
=== Early life and education ===
Taylor was born in a log cabin in Wolcottville, Indiana. His father was Venorris Raymond Taylor, a farmer and member of the Indiana General Assembly, originally from Lawrence County, Ohio who settled first in LaGrange County and Iowa Territory before coming to Noble County. William Taylor's mother was Mary Ann (née Rowe) Taylor of Marion, Ohio.

Taylor worked on the family farm before becoming a section hand on the Grand Rapids and Indiana Railroad at age sixteen. He was promoted to fireman and considered a long-term career on the railroad, but ultimately decided against it. Taylor attended common school in Wolcottville before attending Hillsdale College in Hillsdale, Michigan. He then attended Indiana University in Bloomington graduating with a B.A. in 1877. In 1881, despite his poverty, Taylor began attending Central Law School (today known as the Indiana University Robert H. McKinney School of Law) in Indianapolis, obtaining his LL.B. from the school and remaining in Indianapolis after graduating. He began practicing law first with Henry Clay Allen (a circuit court judge) and Stanton J. Peelle (a U.S. Representative from Indiana and later Chief Justice of the United States Court of Claims), and later with Floyd A. Woods (son of federal judge William Allen Woods).

=== Political career ===
Taylor, a Republican, was elected city attorney of Indianapolis in 1885. He was re-elected to the position in 1887 and served until 1889.

In 1886, Taylor traveled across the state with Benjamin Harrison (later President of the United States) to campaign for candidates of the Indiana Republican Party in numerous upcoming elections. Taylor gave numerous speeches during his tour of the state and gained a reputation within the party as a skilled public speaker.

In 1889, after receiving the unanimous nomination by 1,500 Republican delegates at the party's convention, Taylor was elected Indiana Attorney General, succeeding William A. Ketcham. Taylor served as Attorney General in the administrations of Governors James A. Mount and Winfield T. Durbin, both Republicans. During his time as Attorney General, Taylor helped to collect a $636,000 war claim filed by the state of Indiana against the federal government three decades prior in 1868, making Indiana the only Union state that collected the entirety of its Civil War claim. Taylor also worked with IU biologist Carl H. Eigenmann to introduce a bill to the General Assembly to establish a state nature reserve in Lawrence County on a tract of farmland to protect the unique flora and fauna that were found to be living there. Former prosecutor Cassius C. Hadley served as Assistant Attorney General to Taylor. Taylor was re-elected to the position in a landslide and served until January 1, 1903, when he was succeeded to the office by Charles W. Miller.

Taylor sought the Republican nomination in the 1904 Indiana gubernatorial election. Those promoting his candidacy claimed that Taylor was a wise choice for the nomination due to his popularity within Marion County, which at that time was a bellwether county that often predicted statewide electoral trends. Taylor was considered "the leading candidate for several months" but ultimately lost the race for the Republican nomination to Frank Hanly, who would go on to win the election.

Taylor served as counsel for the city corporation of Indianapolis.

=== Personal life and death ===
Taylor was a member of the Indianapolis Bar Association. In 1929, he was elected president of the association with no opposition.

Taylor was a member of the Methodist Episcopal Church.

Taylor died in 1940.

Political offices
Preceded by William A. Ketcham	Indiana Attorney General; 1898-1903	Succeeded by Charles W. Miller
