= Indiana White Caps =

American vigilante group

White caps were groups involved in the whitecapping movement who were operating in southern Indiana in the late 19th century. They engaged in vigilante justice and lynchings, with modern viewpoints describing their actions as domestic terrorism. They became common in the state following the American Civil War and lasted until the turn of the 20th century. White caps were especially active in Crawford and neighboring counties in the late 1880s. Several members of the Reno Gang were lynched in 1868, causing an international incident. Some of the members had been extradited to the United States from Canada and were supposed to be under federal protection. Lynchings continued against other criminals, but when two possibly innocent men were killed in Corydon in 1889, Indiana responded by cracking down on the white cap vigilante groups, beginning in the administration of Isaac P. Gray.

Governor of Indiana James A. Mount belonged to one of the white cap groups, and reversed state policy of trying to stop the groups. His successor, Winfield T. Durbin, resumed the policy in 1900, two years after the Indiana General Assembly passed a strong anti-lynching law. When a lynching occurred in Vincennes in 1902 Durbin removed several law enforcement personnel from their positions, to show that he expected locals to cooperate in stopping the lynching. His plan worked; however, when a lynching was threatened in the following year in Evansville, local police notified Durbin who called out the state militia to guard the jailhouse. When the white cap groups attacked the jailhouse, the militia opened fire, shooting dozens of people, several of them fatally. The confrontation is known as the Evansville race riot.

The show of force effectively brought an end to vigilante lynching in Indiana. Only two recorded lynchings have occurred since then, the 1930 murders of Thomas Shipp and Abram Smith. Lynching in Indiana was not explicitly racial, but tended to occur against anyone suspected of murder. Between 1860 and 1910, at least 68 people were lynched; twenty were blacks and forty-eight were whites.

== Early white cap activity ==
=== Reno Gang lynching ===
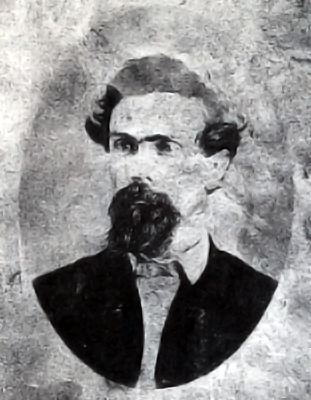
Frank Reno, one of the first lynching victims in Indiana

In the years following the American Civil War, southern Indiana experienced several high-profile criminal events. The Reno Gang began to terrorize the region in the immediate years after the war, becoming the first gang in the nation to begin robbing trains. They sacked rural towns, murdered and robbed travelers, and carried out numerous acts of indiscriminate violence against people. The state police were unable to bring the group under control, but the Pinkerton Agency was hired by one of the robbed train companies to pursue and capture the group. It took a year for the Pinkertons to capture the gang leaders and the townspeople had already grown wary of the gang and had formed the "Jackson County Committee of Vigilance" in 1868, one of the first of the white cap groups in Indiana. Most likely made of up Civil War veterans, they attacked the jail where the men were held and lynched three of them. Four more gang members were captured in Canada and were extradited to the United States. The same group of hooded men traveled by night, marching in formation as they attacked the New Albany jail where the prisoners were held, wounding the county sheriff, and lynching the men.

Their murders caused an international incident with Great Britain, who demanded to know why they had not been adequately protected and threatened to cancel their extradition treaty with the United States. Given the severity of the gang's crimes, and the near certainty they would have suffered the same fate after a trial, the state government did not take any action against the white cap group.

=== Moral police ===
White caps groups began to spring up across the state over the next decade. By the mid-1870s, there were numerous such groups like the State Horse Thief Detective Association, which carried out vigilante justice against horse thieves. The groups operated in secret, and had an element of masonic influence in their organization. The groups were most prevalent in the southern part of Indiana, and especially so in Harrison and Crawford Counties. Many of the groups started as enforcers of morality. They were known to target alcoholics, people believed to be idle, and men who did not provide for their families. Such people were often abducted and flogged.

They soon began to target women who were not believed to be adequately caring for their home and children, children who were truant from school, and people who shirked from civic duty like working on road projects. By the late 1870s, the groups were beginning to target criminals for punishment, and continued to carry out sporadic lynchings.

== State crackdown ==
=== Early measures ===
The June 13, 1889, lynching of two men in Corydon sparked an outcry for something to be done about the vigilantes. A mob of 150 mounted men, led by twenty masked white caps, arrived at the county jail and demanded the release into their custody of two men (James Devin and Charles Tennyson) being held on charges of attempted murder. The leaders of the group demanded the keys to the jail, threatening to burn down the town if they were refused; after the sheriff refused to hand over the keys, the mob used hammers to knock down the jail doors and removed the two alleged assailants. The two men were dragged to the old Western Bridge, where they were hanged. The guilt of the men was not widely accepted, and many believed they had been killed unfairly and deserved a trial.

In 1889, Governor of Indiana Isaac P. Gray was the first to begin attempting to put an end to the white cap's activities. He did so primarily by offering increased police support to local officials in southern Indiana. The measure proved ineffective though, because many of the local sheriffs were themselves members of the organizations and turned a blind eye to the activity. Governor Alvin Hovey, an American Civil War general who had campaigned in part on the white cap problem, was the next governor to combat them. He continued his predecessor's attempt to have local law enforcement play a role in stopping the white caps, but ratcheted up the rhetoric by making threats to remove local law enforcement from office and declare martial law in towns where lynchings occurred. His threats were somewhat successful, and only two lynchings occurred during his term.

Governor Claude Matthews took another step in dealing with the groups, primarily by attempting to identify and prosecute leaders of the groups. His attempts were mostly unsuccessful in capturing anyone of merit, but did add another level of suppression to the groups. When James A. Mount came to office though, he stopped most of the anti-white cap policies. He himself had been a member of one such organization. During his term, the groups became increasingly active, leading to numerous incidents of vigilante justice and a rise in lynchings. The Indiana General Assembly attempted to force the governor to action by passing a law in 1898 that required local sheriffs to petition the governor for support in the event of a threatened lynching. They also authorized the governor to call out the militia to protect prisoners, and granted him the power to remove local officials from office if they did not notify him of a threatened act of violence. Despite the law, Mount took no action against the groups during his term.

=== Confrontation ===
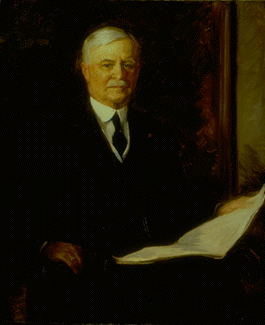
Governor of Indiana Winfield T. Durbin cracked down on white caps.

Winfield T. Durbin succeeded Mount in 1900 and began a vigorous campaign to put an end to the white caps. In 1902, he invoked the new anti-lynching law after a lynching in Vincennes. He removed from office numerous law enforcement officials and put the militia on patrol, and launched a host of investigations into local government.

In Evansville in 1903, a black man, Lee, killed a white police officer who was trying to prevent Lee from killing another black man at a bar. The next night, a mob of over 100 people surrounded the jailhouse with the intent of lynching Lee. The sheriff refused to submit to the mob, which then broke down the gate but lacked the organization or leadership to actually storm the jail. By 4 pm the next day, the mob had melted away, and the sheriff then immediately sent Lee away to Vincennes for safekeeping. Later that day, some people in Evansville began to loot weapons stores and then went into black parts of town, firing at two black people and shooting up two black bars, but no one was seriously injured. The next day was to be a circus day. The sheriff sent word to governor Durbin for assistance; and he in turn quickly dispatched a company of militia from Vincennes. These 40 or 50 men were stationed around the jailhouse. A mob then began to form, slowly at first, and largely composed of curious onlookers and passers-by. No effort was made to prevent this mob from forming. As the hours passed, the mob gradually became hostile, starting with insults towards the militia. There eventually came a point where someone threw a rock at a militiaman, which was immediately followed by someone else firing a pistol at the militia. In response, the militia, largely composed of young men not trained for such situations, opened fire on the crowd, which then dispersed. Many of those killed or wounded that day were innocent bystanders, and some were children; all were white. These events came to be known as the Evansville Race Riot. As a result of these proceedings, many from the local black community fled the city and did not return. This debacle also marked the end of White Cap activity in the state.

== Aftermath ==
No more lynchings would occur in Indiana for more than thirty years until the deaths of Thomas Shipp and Abram Smith in 1930. Between 1865 and 1905, at least sixty-eight people had been lynched by the white caps. In all cases, the victims had been suspected criminals, almost all of which were in state custody when they were killed. Forty-eight of the victims were whites, while twenty were blacks. Although the white cap ended their lynching and more severe forms of vigilante justice, the Indiana branch of the Ku Klux Klan began to rise in the following decade, drawing many former white caps into their numbers.

== See also ==
- Whitecapping
- Indiana Klan
