= Charles W. Miller =

Indiana Attorney General, 1903–1907

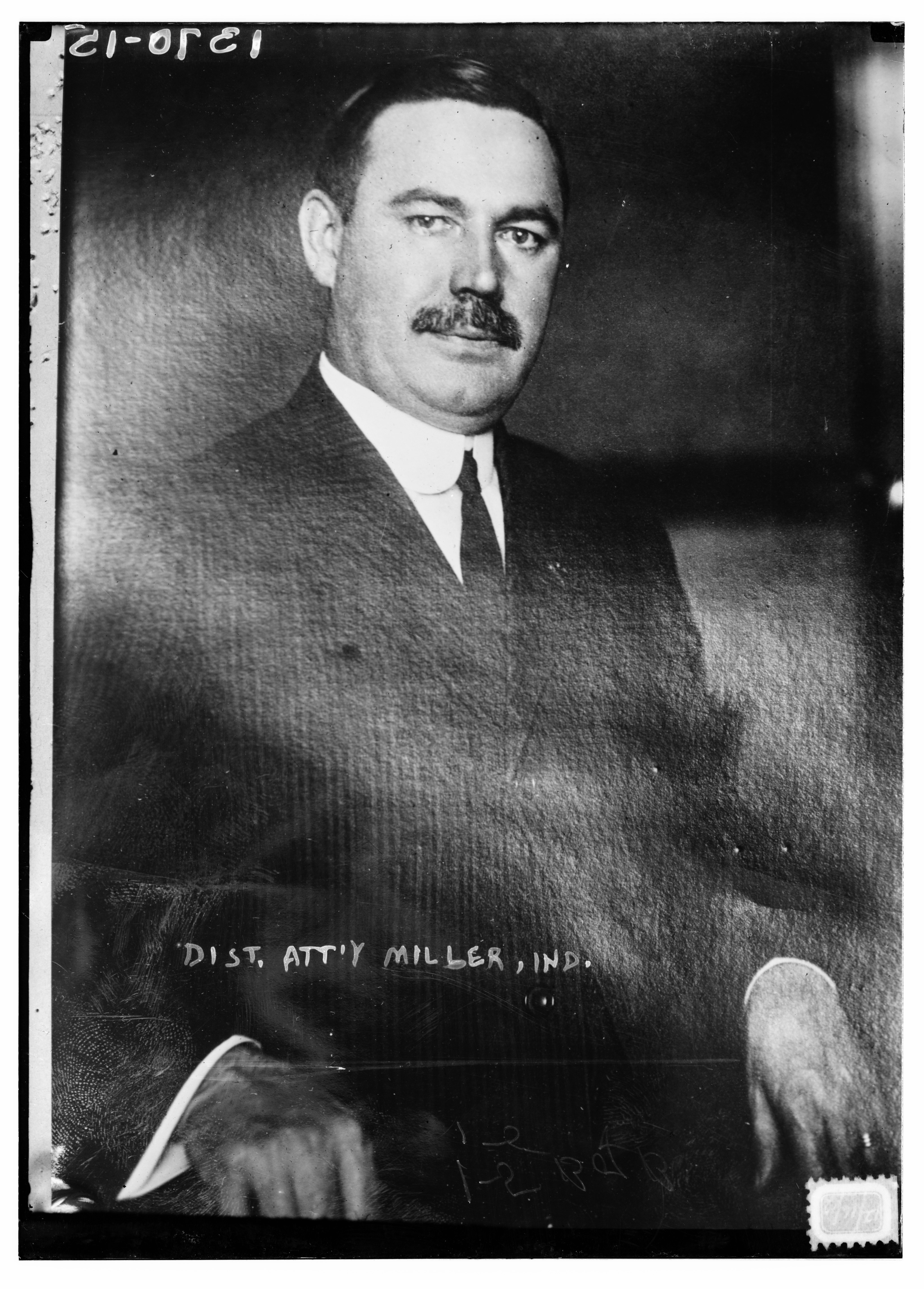

18th Indiana Attorney General
- In office January 1, 1903 – January 1, 1907
- Governor: Winfield T. Durbin, Frank Hanly
- Preceded by: William L. Taylor
- Succeeded by: James Bingham

Personal details
- Born: Charles Wesley Miller; February 4, 1863 Floyd County, Indiana, US
- Died: February 16, 1923 (aged 60) Indianapolis, Indiana, US
- Spouse: Sarah Elizabeth Perkins (m. 1887)

Charles Wesley Miller (February 4, 1863 – February 16, 1923) was an American lawyer, politician, and businessman who served as the eighteenth Indiana Attorney General from January 1, 1903, to January 1, 1907, and as the U.S. Attorney for the District of Indiana from 1909 to 1913.

== Biography ==
=== Early life and education ===
Miller was born in Floyd County, Indiana, to Jacob B. and Isabelle Miller. His parents, both natives of Floyd County, were farmers.

Miller attended common school in Floyd County. He then attended a private school in Paoli, Normal College in Ladoga, and lastly the University of Michigan Law School in Ann Arbor, from which he graduated in 1884. Miller returned to Indiana after graduating, settling in Goshen.

=== Political career ===
At age twenty-four, Miller (a Republican) was elected mayor of Goshen. He held no other political offices until his election as Indiana Attorney General.

Miller was a delegate to the 1892 Republican National Convention in Minneapolis, Minnesota. Miller served as chairman of the Elkhart County Republican Central Committee and as a member of the advisory committee to the Indiana Republican Central Committee.

Miller was elected Attorney General in 1902, succeeding William L. Taylor. He served as Attorney General in the administration of Republican Governors Winfield T. Durbin and Frank Hanly. In 1906, Miller (breaking with former Attorney General Alonzo G. Smith's decision on the matter) supported the state government's lawsuits against hotel companies in French Lick and West Baden Springs regarding illegal gambling. Also, in 1906, Miller reviewed and approved the appointment of Mary Stubbs to the office of state statistician. Mary Stubbs had previously served as assistant to the former statistician, her father, Joseph Stubbs, but he had died while in office. Governor Hanly nominated Mary Stubbs to her father's former position. Despite the controversy surrounding the appointment due to Stubbs's gender, Miller declared that Governor Hanly had the authority to nominate a woman for the position. Additionally, Miller earned the ire of labor organizations in East Chicago due to his opposition to a bill regarding Calumet River canal construction. The Brotherhood of Railroad Trainmen declared Miller an enemy of labor unions and opposed his re-election campaign. Despite this, Miller was re-elected to the position in 1904. He served until 1907, when he was succeeded by James Bingham.

After leaving office, Miller remained in Indianapolis to practice law. From 1909 to 1913, Miller was a U.S. Attorney for the District of Indiana. While serving as U.S. Attorney, Miller wrote a letter to U.S. Attorney General George W. Wickersham questioning the involvement of the Justice Department in the prosecution of the 1911 Los Angeles Times bombing.

=== Personal life and death ===
Miller was a friend of Francis E. Baker, a Goshen native who served as a Justice of the Indiana Supreme Court and as a U.S. Circuit Judge. They practiced law at the firm of Baker & Miller in Goshen, which grew to be one of the most prominent legal firms of Northern Indiana. Both Joseph Mitchell (an Indiana Supreme Court Justice) and John H. Baker (a U.S. Representative from Indiana and a U.S. District Judge) both practiced law at this firm with Baker and Miller. John H. Baker convinced Miller to support Albert J. Beveridge's candidacy in a race for a U.S. Senate seat.

Miller was president of the State Bank of Goshen, the Elkhart County Loan and Trust Company, and two local telephone companies. He also served as secretary of Lesh, Prouty & Abbott Company, a walnut lumber manufacturing business in East Chicago.

Miller gave a patriotic address to students during a Memorial Day celebration at Purdue University in 1907. He was a member of the Knights of Pythias.

He married Sarah Elizabeth Perkins of Goshen in 1887.

Miller was found dead in his hotel room in Indianapolis on February 17, 1923. City detectives determined that he had drunk carbolic acid and cut his own throat the previous day.

The Indiana University Maurer School of Law named a fellowship in his honor.

Political offices
Preceded by William L. Taylor	Indiana Attorney General; 1903-1907	Succeeded by James Bingham
