= 1900 Indiana gubernatorial election =

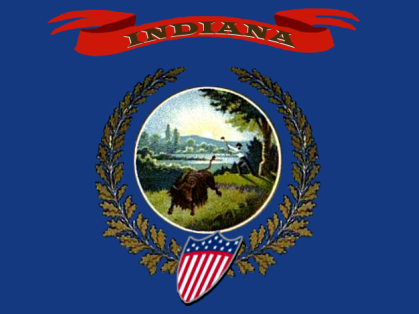
- November 6, 1900
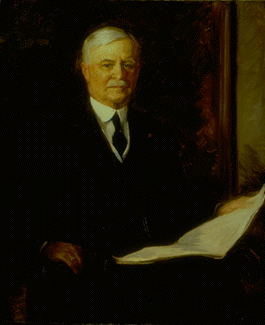

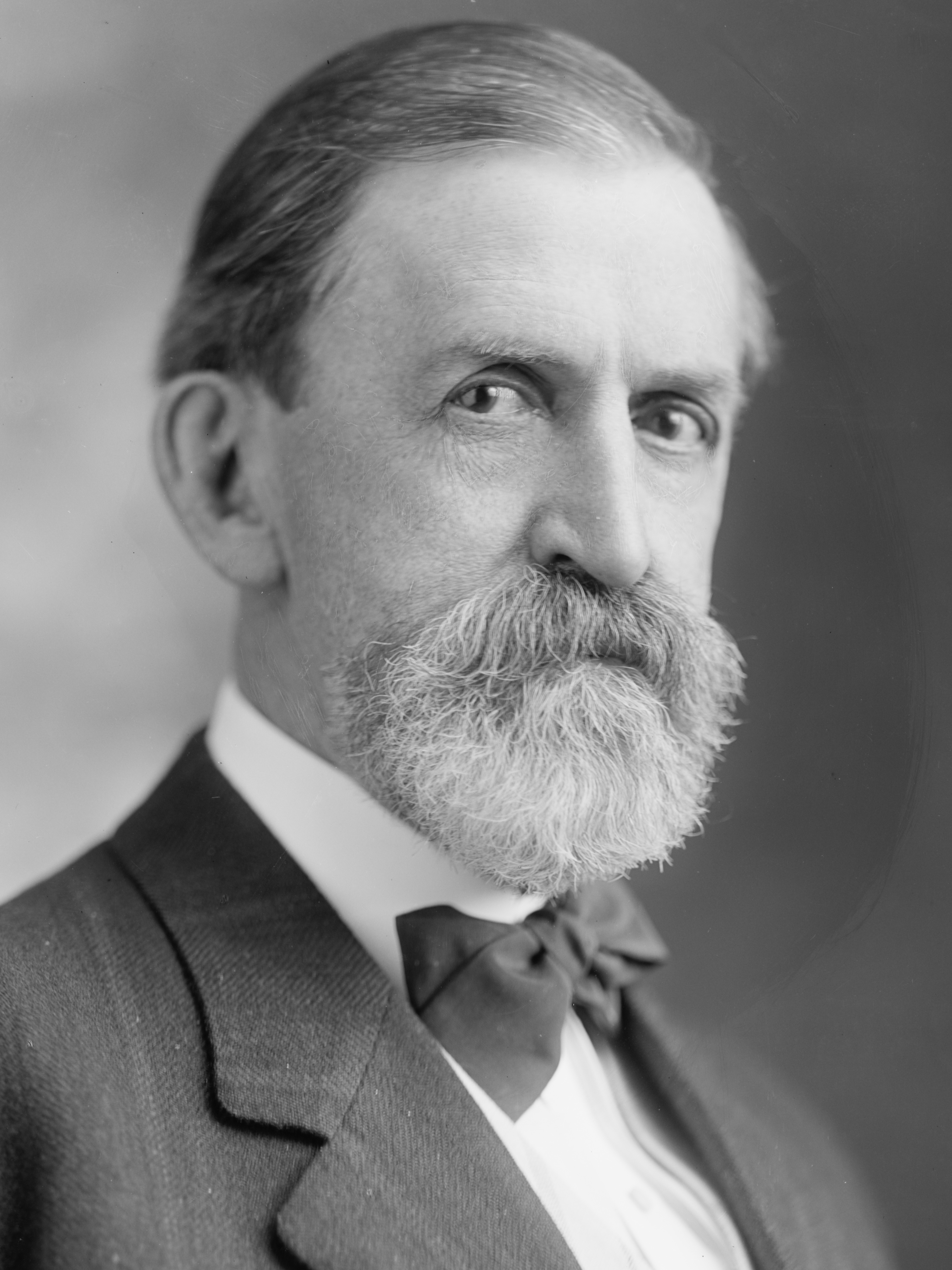
Nominee	Winfield T. Durbin	John W. Kern
Party	Republican	Democratic
Popular vote	331,531	306,361
Percentage	50.56%	46.72%
- County results Durbin: 40–50% 50–60% 60–70% Kern: 40–50% 50–60% 60–70%
Governor before election
James A. Mount
Republican
Elected Governor
Winfield T. Durbin
Republican

The 1900 Indiana gubernatorial election was held on November 6, 1900, in all 92 counties in the state of Indiana. Governor James A. Mount could not succeed himself to a second term. Winfield T. Durbin was elected governor over his Democratic opponent, John W. Kern. Mount died from a heart-attack just 2 days after Durbin's inauguration.

== Nominations ==
Durbin (member of the Indiana Republican Central Committee) was nominated to run for governor in 1900, and easily won the convention vote.

Opinion was strongly against Democrats, and the leading members of the party refused to run for governor that year. The party fielded John Kern, a former state senator serving at the time as city solicitor of Indianapolis, to oppose Durbin.

== General election ==
Durbin became the first governor to win by majority in twenty-five years. Durbin's primary goal as governor was to bring efficiency to the state, and reform the government to function more economically, and to enact progressive legislation.

Indiana gubernatorial election, 1900
Party	Candidate	Votes	%
Republican	Winfield T. Durbin	331,531	50.56
Democratic	John W. Kern	306,361	46.72
Prohibition	Charles N. Eckhart	13,451	2.05
Social Democratic	John W. Kelly	2,240	0.34
Populist	Alonzo G. Burkhart	1,504	0.22
Socialist Labor	Philip H. More	644	0.10
Union Reform	M. A. Wilson	227	0.03
Total votes		655,695	100.00

== Bibliography ==
- Hunt, Union B. (1900). Biennial Report of Union B. Hunt, Secretary of State of the State of Indiana [...]. Indianapolis.
