= William A. Ketcham =

Indiana Attorney General, 1894-1898

16th Indiana Attorney General
- In office November 22, 1894 – November 22, 1898
- Governor: Claude Matthews, James A. Mount
- Preceded by: Alonzo G. Smith
- Succeeded by: William L. Taylor

Personal details
- Born: January 2, 1846 Indianapolis, Indiana, US
- Died: December 27, 1921 (aged 75) Indianapolis, Indiana, US

William Alexander Ketcham (January 2, 1846 - December 27, 1921) was an American lawyer, soldier, and politician who served as the sixteenth Indiana Attorney General from November 22, 1894, to November 22, 1898. Ketcham also served as Commander-in-Chief of the Grand Army of the Republic from September 24, 1920, to September 29, 1921.

== Biography ==
=== Early life and education ===
Ketcham was born in Indianapolis to John L. and Jane (née Merrill) Ketcham. John L. Ketcham (son of politician and surveyor John Ketcham) was a leading lawyer of the Indianapolis bar association who was born in Kentucky, but came to Indiana with his family at a young age. Jane Ketcham was the daughter of Samuel Merrill, Indiana State Treasurer, a member of the Indiana General Assembly, and President of the Jeffersonville, Madison and Indianapolis Railroad Company. William Ketcham's sister was the painter, Susan Merrill Ketcham. His aunt was the nurse and professor, Catharine Merrill.

Ketcham attended public school in Indianapolis until age thirteen when he studied for two years abroad in Germany. In 1861, Ketcham began attending Wabash College in Crawfordsville. He remained a student at the college until February 1864, when he enlisted, joining Company A of the 13th Indiana Infantry Regiment. Ketcham fought in the Battle of Cold Harbor, the Bermuda Hundred Campaign, the Richmond-Petersburg Campaign, and the Second Battle of Fort Fisher. He attained the rank of captain before leaving the regiment in September 1865.

Following his time in the Union Army, Ketcham began attending Dartmouth College in Hanover, New Hampshire, graduating in 1867. Ketcham returned to Indianapolis and read law with his father and a judge, David McDonald, Ketcham's future father-in-law. He was admitted to the bar in 1869 and began practice with his father and James L. Mitchell (who later served as Mayor of Indianapolis). Later, he would practice law with Horatio F. Newcomb and Solomon Claypool. Their firm became one of the leading legal practices in the state. Ketcham remained with the firm until 1890 when he left to open a separate practice.

=== Political career ===
Ketcham, a Republican, served as Marion County attorney from 1884 to 1886. During his time as county attorney, he was specially employed to represent the state of Indiana in various notable cases, including cases regarding the constitutionality of an indeterminate sentencing law, a case against the Ohio Oil Company, and a case against the Vandalia Railroad Company regarding taxation.

Ketcham was elected Indiana Attorney General in 1894, succeeding Alonzo G. Smith. He served in the administrations of Governors Claude Matthews (a Democrat) and James A. Mount (a Republican). As Attorney General, Ketcham broke up a notorious ring of gamblers at the Roby horse racetrack in Hammond, successfully convinced the Indiana Supreme Court that apportionment laws passed in 1893 and 1895 were unconstitutional, and represented the state in a case against the Chicago and Eastern Illinois Railroad regarding unpaid incorporation fees. He was re-elected in 1896 and was succeeded by William L. Taylor.

After leaving office, Ketcham returned to practicing law in Indianapolis.

=== Personal life and death ===
Ketcham was affiliated with the Grand Army of the Republic. From 1907 to 1908, he served as commander of the G.A.R. department of Indiana, and from 1915 to 1920, he was one of the organization's national judge advocates. He was elected Commander-in-Chief of the G.A.R. at the fifty-fourth annual encampment in Indianapolis in 1920. He retired at the next annual encampment, also in Indianapolis, one year after his election, succeeded as commander-in-chief by Lewis Pilcher.

At a G.A.R. encampment in Minneapolis, Ketcham gave a speech opposing the decision by the Daughters of the Confederacy to construct a monument to Henry Wirz, a Confederate officer who terrorized thousands of Union prisoners of war at Andersonville Prison. He gave a particularly controversial speech at an encampment in Boston, during which he promoted the Americanization of immigrants to the United States. The Boston crowd so poorly received his remarks that forty members of the Massachusetts General Court signed a statement decrying Ketcham's address. Ketcham responded by stating, "We do not want German-Americans, Irish-Americans or Russian-Americans but just plain, every-day Americans." He similarly condemned a meeting of German sympathizers in Madison Square Garden during the First World War and further promoted Americanization and nationalism in a speech at the Cadle Tabernacle. During another speech at an encampment in Indianapolis, he denounced pacifism, Bolshevism, the I.W.W., and the Ku Klux Klan.

Ketcham supported the construction of the Soldiers' and Sailors' Monument in downtown Indianapolis. He served twelve years on the Monument's board of control and authored a letter in protest of two county commissioners who opposed the Monument's construction.

In 1873, Ketcham married Flora McDonald, daughter of Ketcham's mentor, Judge David McDonald. They had six children, all daughters.

Ketcham was a lifelong Presbyterian. His parents were associated with the Second Presbyterian Church of Indianapolis, and Ketcham was baptized by the famous clergyman and abolitionist, Henry Ward Beecher. Ketcham later joined the city's Fourth Presbyterian Church. Ketcham was associated with the Indianapolis Chamber of Commerce, the Columbia Club, the Indianapolis Literary Club (serving once as the club's president), the Loyal Legion, and the Wabash College Alumni Association.

Ketcham died of indigestion in 1921 in Indianapolis.

Political offices
Preceded by Alonzo G. Smith	Indiana Attorney General; 1894-1898	Succeeded by William L. Taylor
