= Thomas M. Honan =

American lawyer and politician (1867–1932)

65th Speaker of the Indiana House of Representatives
- In office November 7, 1908 – November 9, 1910
- Preceded by: Emmett Forest Branch
- Succeeded by: Albert J. Veneman

20th Indiana Attorney General
- In office January 1, 1911 – January 1, 1915
- Governor: Thomas R. Marshall, Samuel M. Ralston
- Preceded by: James Bingham
- Succeeded by: Richard M. Milburn

Thomas Michael Honan (August 8, 1867 - September 21, 1932) was an American lawyer and politician who served as the sixty-fifth Speaker of the Indiana House of Representatives (from November 7, 1908, to November 9, 1910) and the twentieth Indiana Attorney General (from January 1, 1911, to January 1, 1915).

== Biography ==
=== Early life and education ===
Honan was born in Seymour, Indiana to James and Mary (née Giger) Honan. James Honan (born in County Clare, Ireland) was a farmer, a businessman, a soldier who served in the 50th Indiana Infantry Regiment during the Civil War, and a saloon owner who is speculated to have had connections to the infamous Reno Gang. Mary Honan was born in Switzerland and originally settled with her family in Ohio.

After completing his education at Shields High School, Honan began attending Hanover College. He transferred to Indiana University Bloomington before graduating in 1889. In 1890, Honan was admitted to the bar and began practicing law with W. T. Branaman.

=== Political career ===
Honan, a Democrat, served three terms as the prosecuting attorney of Indiana's forty-second judicial district (comprising the counties of Jackson, Washington, and Orange). He also served four years as Seymour's city attorney.

Honan was elected to represent Jackson County in the Indiana House of Representatives. He served in the sixty-fourth, sixty-fifth, and sixty-sixth sessions of the legislature. Honan was elected Speaker of the House in the sixty-sixth session, serving from 1908 to 1910. During his time as Speaker, he was a member of several important committees and supported the passage of remedial legislation. He also consistently voted against laws pushed by the Temperance movement to curb alcohol consumption.

Honan was elected Indiana Attorney General in 1910, succeeding James Bingham. He served in the administrations of Democratic Governors Thomas R. Marshall and Samuel M. Ralston. As Attorney General, he continued to fight against Temperance movement-backed legislation. Honan also successfully defended a 1907 "full-crew" law before the U.S. Supreme Court following a legal challenge by the Pennsylvania Railroad Company which tried to convince the court that the law was unconstitutional. Honan also cracked down on illegal gambling in French Lick and West Baden Springs. Honan's appointee to the office of second deputy attorney general, Omer Stokes Jackson, would later serve as Attorney General himself. After four years, Honan was succeeded by Richard M. Milburn.

When his service as Attorney General concluded, Honan returned to Seymour and resumed practicing law there.

=== Personal life and death ===
Honan remained a bachelor throughout his life.

Honan was a Catholic, an Elk, a member of Phi Delta Theta, and a trustee of Indiana University Bloomington.

Honan fell ill in 1929 while traveling to Texas. After many years of declining health, Honan died at St. Vincent Indianapolis Hospital in 1932.

Political offices
Preceded by Emmett Forest Branch	Speaker of the Indiana House of Representatives; 1908-1910	Succeeded by Albert J. Veneman
Preceded by James Bingham	Indiana Attorney General; 1911–1915	Succeeded by Richard M. Milburn
