= James Bingham (Indiana politician) =

American lawyer and politician (1861–1940)

19th Indiana Attorney General
- In office January 1, 1907 – January 1, 1911
- Governor: Frank Hanly, Thomas R. Marshall
- Preceded by: Charles W. Miller
- Succeeded by: Thomas M. Honan

Personal details
- Born: March 16, 1861
- Died: August 19, 1940 (aged 79)
- Resting place: Crown Hill Cemetery and Arboretum, Section 14, Lot 69; 39.8203784°N 86.1752581°W

James Bingham (March 16, 1861 – August 19, 1940) was an American lawyer and politician who served as the nineteenth Indiana Attorney General from January 1, 1907, to January 1, 1911.

== Biography ==
=== Early life and education ===
Bingham was born in Fountain County, Indiana. His father was Alexander Bingham, a farmer.

Growing up, Bingham worked on the family farm and on the railroad. After his time at the local district schools, Bingham attended Valparaiso Normal School for six months before becoming a schoolteacher at age fifteen. At age twenty-one, after six years of teaching, Bingham was elected superintendent of Fountain County schools. As superintendent, he held one of Indiana's first grade school graduations and organized a course of study for the county's common schools (he would later serve on a committee that prepared a statewide course of study for all Indiana grade schools).

In 1885, Bingham helped open law offices in Covington. In 1887, he was admitted to the Fountain County bar, but during the course of his "tireless study of law", he had severely damaged his eyesight. Bingham's wife, Elizabeth, had to assist him in his legal work before his vision eventually recovered.

=== Political career ===
Bingham, a Republican, served as prosecuting attorney of Fountain and Warren counties. Ele Stansbury, who would later become the twenty-third Indiana Attorney General, served under Bingham at this time as deputy prosecuting attorney.

In 1888, Bingham served as chairman of the Fountain County Republican Party and campaigned in the county for Republican presidential candidate Benjamin Harrison.

In 1892, Bingham moved to Muncie. Opening a law office, he practiced in the city until he was elected Attorney General.

Bingham was elected Indiana Attorney General in 1906, succeeding Charles W. Miller. Bingham served in the administrations of Governors Frank Hanly (a Republican) and Thomas R. Marshall (a Democrat). During his time as Attorney General, Bingham enforced state alcohol laws amid the nationwide debate over laws curbing alcohol consumption that would lead to Indiana becoming a dry state in 1918. Bingham is also remembered for his fight for the passage of state legislation on food purity, responding again to another topical cause of the Progressive Era, with the Pure Food and Drug Act having been passed by Congress months before Bingham took office. Bingham also helped to break up an insurance monopoly within the state by obtaining an injunction against the activities of the rating bureaus of various insurance companies. Bingham also voiced his concerns about a 1907 state sterilization law (the first of its kind in the nation, inspired by the growing popularity of eugenics), questioning the constitutionality of the law. Edward M. White, a judge from Muncie, served as Assistant Attorney General under Bingham (the two would later practice law together). Bingham left office after four years, succeeded by Thomas M. Honan.

After leaving office, Bingham remained in Indianapolis and opened a private law practice with his son, Remster A. Bingham. Bingham was involved as an attorney in two test cases originating from Ohio that led the U.S. Supreme Court to affirm the constitutionality of the Eighteenth and Nineteenth Amendments, enacting nationwide Prohibition and granting women the right to vote respectively.

In 1908, Bingham wrote a letter to U.S. President Theodore Roosevelt encouraging him to seek a third term instead of allowing William Taft to be the Republican nominee in the upcoming election.

=== Personal life and death ===
In 1887, Bingham married Elizabeth Remster, a high school principal from Veedersburg. Elizabeth was the sister of an Indianapolis judge. She died in 1925. One of their sons, Remster A. Bingham, was a national judge advocate of the American Legion and a member of the state board of law examiners. Another son, Charles Bingham, served in the First World War and died young of an illness caused by his service.

Bingham was a member of the American Bar Association, the Indiana State Bar Association, and the Indianapolis Bar Association. He was also a member of the Indiana Historical Society and the Columbia Club. He attended the Second Presbyterian Church in Indianapolis.

Bingham died in 1940. He was buried in Crown Hill Cemetery.

Political offices
Preceded by Charles W. Miller	Indiana Attorney General; 1907–1911	Succeeded by Thomas M. Honan
