= Flossie Bailey =

American civil rights and anti-lynching activist

Katherine "Flossie" Bailey
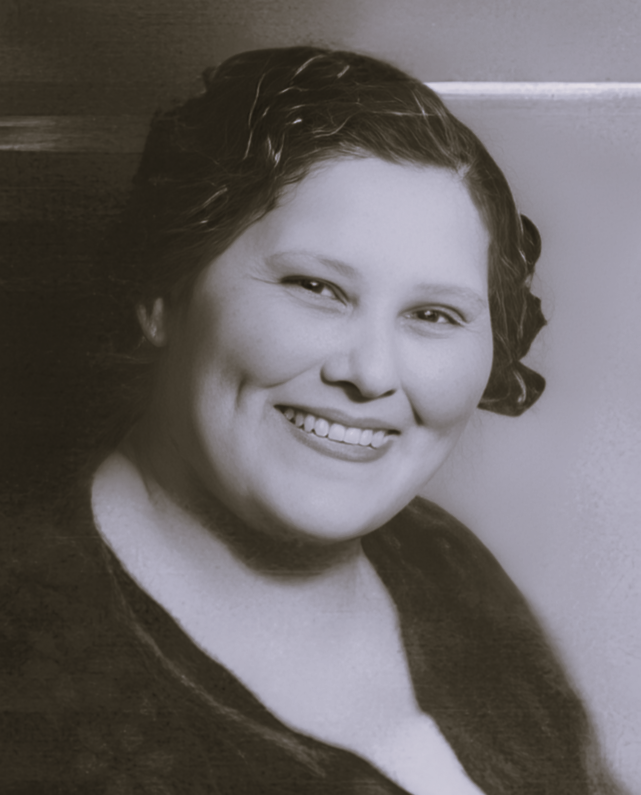
- Flossie Bailey, Indianapolis Recorder, accessed Hoosier State Chronicles
- Born: Katherine Harvey; 1895; Kokomo, Indiana
- Died: February 6, 1952 (aged 56–57); Indianapolis, Indiana
- Citizenship: United States
- Occupation: Civil rights activist
- Years active: 1918–43
- Organization: NAACP
- Known for: Anti-lynching activism
- Title: President, Indiana NAACP
- Spouse: Walter T. Bailey
- Children: Walter Charles Bailey

Katherine "Flossie" Bailey (1895 – February 6, 1952) was a civil rights and anti-lynching activist from Indiana. She established a local chapter of the National Association for the Advancement of Colored People (NAACP) in Marion, Indiana, in 1918 and became especially active fighting for justice and equality following the double lynching of Thomas Shipp and Abram Smith in 1930. As president of the Indiana NAACP, Bailey was pivotal in lobbying for passage of a statewide anti-lynching law in Indiana in 1931 and advocated for a similar bill at the national level. She was also a recipient of the national NAACP's Madam C. J. Walker Medal.

== Early life and education ==
Katherine Harvey, the daughter of Mr. and Mrs. Charles Harvey, was born in Kokomo, Indiana, in 1895. Known as "Flossie", she grew up in Kokomo and attended Kokomo High School.

== Marriage and family ==
Flossie married Walter T. Bailey, a physician, in 1917. The couple resided in Marion, Indiana. Doctor Bailey died on February 10, 1950. Their only surviving child was a son named Walter Charles Bailey.

While living in Marion, Bailey also became actively involved in the Marion community. She was a member of the city's Bethel African Methodist Episcopal Church congregation.

== Career ==
Bailey spent her adult life seeking equality and justice as a civil rights activist. In 1918, Bailey established the Marion branch of the National Association for the Advancement of Colored People (NAACP). Initially, it did not receive much support. In June 1930, it had 96 members. However, after the Marion community was the site of a lynching in August 1930, the local chapter's membership increased. By the end of 1930, the total member count went up to 155 members.

On August 7, 1930, a mob broke into the Grant County, Indiana's jail (in Marion), dragging out two African-American men, Thomas Shipp and Abram Smith. They brought them to the Courthouse Square and lynched them from a tree. Bailey, who was the president of the local branch of the NAACP, tried to obtain police protection for the jailed men prior to the lynching. Afterwards, she was actively involved in organizing a Hoosier delegation of NAACP members to speak to Indiana governor Harry Leslie and persuade him to intervene in the investigation of the men's murders.

Bailey, and a number of others, worked hard to obtain a fair investigation into the double lynching. Despite objections from those in the Marion community who wanted to forget about the event, Bailey and the NAACP played an important role in seeking justice for the murders of Shipp and Smith, as well as to restore calm in Marion. Two men were indicted and went on trial for the lynching, but neither one was found guilty of the crime, and no one was ever punished for the deaths of Shipp and Smith.

In 1930, Bailey was elected president of the Indiana NAACP and helped plan its second annual meeting. The Bailey home in Marion became the Indiana headquarters for the NAACP. The national organization recognized Bailey's efforts by awarding her the Madam C. J. Walker Medal for "the person who has done the best work in the NAACP during the year."

Bailey worked to ensure nothing like the lynching in Marion would occur again. She lobbied the Indiana General Assembly to pass stricter anti-lynching laws. When opponents to the bill rejected many of the safety measures, Bailey organized a statewide effort, calling on chapters of the NAACP, Optimist Clubs, Exchange Clubs, and Democratic organizations to lobby state legislators. Bailey's efforts were successful and the governor signed a stricter anti-lynching law in March 1931. Once the Indiana bill became law, Bailey began lobbying for a national anti-lynching law, as well as for the fair treatment of African Americans in other sectors of American life. Bailey especially focused on fighting to end the segregation of schools, hospitals, and other public spaces such as movie theaters.

== Later years ==
Bailey and the NAACP struggled during the years of the Great Depression. Her husband, who suffered a stroke, closed his medical practice in Marion around 1940, and the couple moved to Indianapolis.

== Death and legacy ==
Bailey died in Indianapolis on February 6, 1952. As an activist and president of the Indiana NAACP in the 1930s, her leadership helped establish a foundation for the civil rights movement of the 1950s.
