= Evan B. Stotsenburg =

Indiana Attorney General, 1915–1917

22nd Indiana Attorney General
- In office November 11, 1915 – January 1, 1917
- Governor: Samuel M. Ralston
- Preceded by: Richard M. Milburn
- Succeeded by: Ele Stansbury

Personal details
- Born: Evan Brown Stotsenburg; May 16, 1865; New Albany, Indiana
- Died: August 1, 1937 (aged 72)

Evan B. Stotsenburg (May 16, 1865 – August 1, 1937) was an American politician and lawyer who served as the twenty-second Indiana Attorney General from November 11, 1915, to January 1, 1917. He also served as President Pro Tempore of the Indiana Senate.

== Biography ==
=== Early life and education ===
Stotsenburg was born in New Albany, Indiana to John H. and Jane "Jennie" F. (née Miller) Stotsenburg. John H. Stotsenburg was a prominent attorney and judge in New Albany. Jennie Stotsenburg was originally from Constableville, New York. Evan's brother was Colonel John M. Stotsenburg who died while serving in the Philippine–American War.

Stotsenburg attended grade school in New Albany before entering the University of Louisville across the Ohio River in Kentucky. He later attended Kenyon College in Gambier, Ohio. He was admitted to the bar in 1886 and began practicing law in New Albany with his father. After his father retired in 1890, Stotsenburg practiced law alone.

=== Political career ===
Stotsenburg, a Democrat, represented Floyd County in the Indiana General Assembly. He served as a state senator from 1905 to 1913 and was elected president pro tempore of the Indiana Senate.

In 1915, following the death of Richard M. Milburn, Governor Samuel M. Ralston appointed Stotsenburg to replace Milburn as the new Indiana Attorney General. In 1916, the Indiana Democratic Party renominated Stotsenburg for a second term as Attorney General, but he was defeated by Republican challenger Ele Stansbury.

Stotsenburg became a member of the State Highway Commission sometime prior to 1936.

=== Personal life and death ===
Stotsenburg married Zenobia Borden of Washington, Arkansas in 1892.

Stotsenburg was a law partner of Sherman Minton, U.S. Senator from Indiana and associate justice of the United States Supreme Court. Stotsenburg's firm, Stotsenburg & Weathers, hired Minton in the early 1920s.

Stotsenburg died in 1937.

Political offices
Preceded by Richard M. Milburn	Indiana Attorney General; 1915–1917	Succeeded by Ele Stansbury
