= Evansville race riot =

1903 riot in Evansville, Indiana, United States

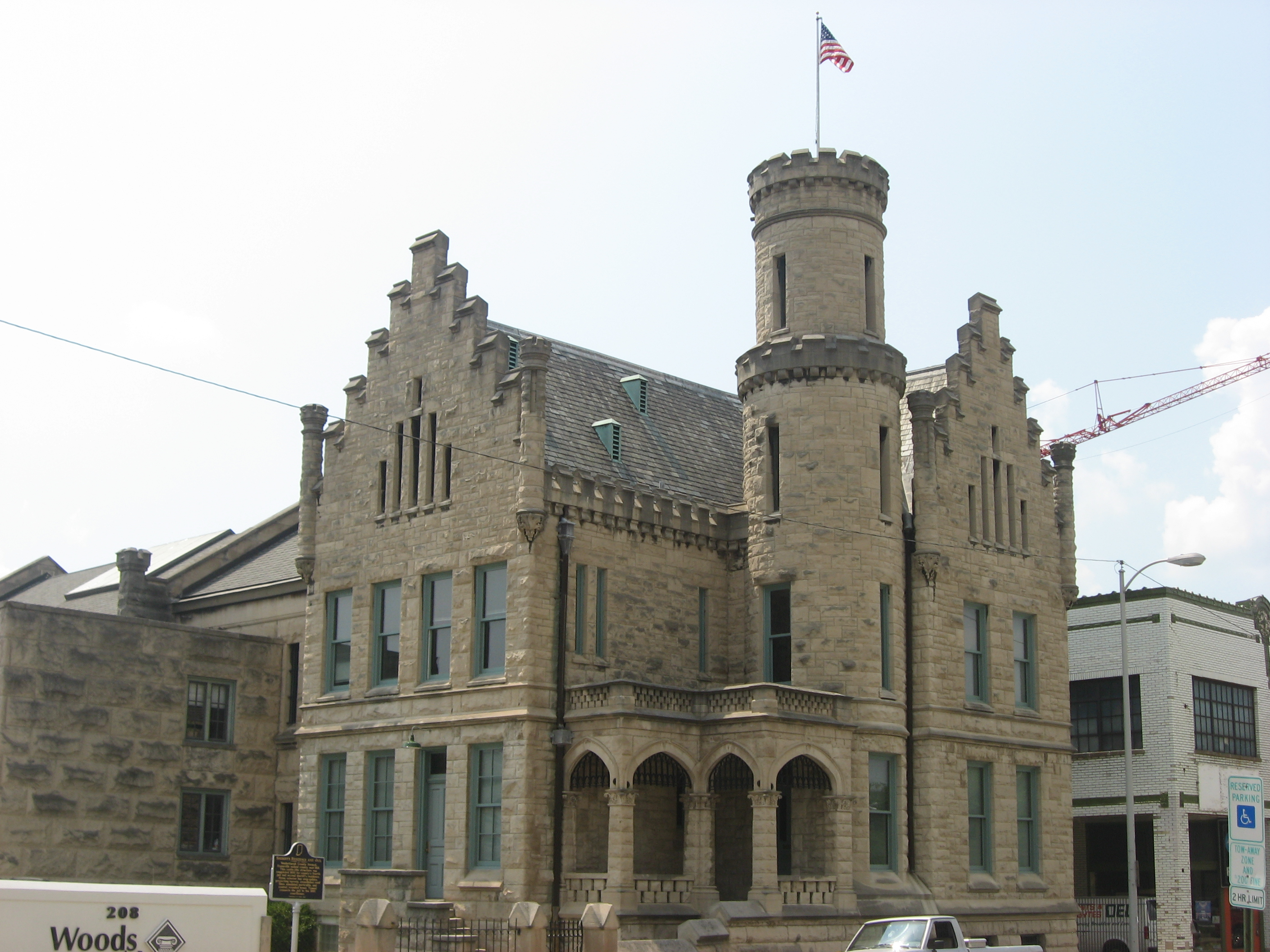
- The old jail at the Former Vanderburgh County Sheriff's Residence, the site where the riot began
- Date: July 5 – 6, 1903
- Location: Evansville, Indiana; 37°58′24.4″N 87°34′22.8″W
- Caused by: Lack of appropriate crowd control by militia / killing of a white policeman by a black man.
- Methods: Attempted lynching, rioting, looting, shootout

Parties
White rioters	Indiana National Guard; Evansville Police Department; Vanderburgh County Sheriff's Department Black residents

Number
1,000+	200 initially

Casualties
- Deaths: 12
- Injuries: 40+
- Location within Indiana

The Evansville Race Riot occurred in July 1903 in Evansville, Indiana and was the worst riot in the city's history. The riots occurred after a black man shot and killed a white policeman and ultimately resulted in 12 deaths.

On July 3, a 33-year-old black man named John Tinsley, had a dispute with a black bartender, Tom Berry, over Tinsley's refusal to pay for a beer. Brown attempted to return to the bar with a gun but was stopped by Louis N. Massey, the most senior policeman on the force. Massey attempted to arrest Tinsley, but Tinsley shot and fatally wounded Massey. However, Massey was able to fire back before dying, wounding Tinsley, who eventually also succumbed to injuries on July 31.

Tinsley was using the name "Lee Brown" and also known as "Robert Lee," but was recognized as a man who had previously served a sentence at the Indiana State Prison. He was imprisoned there from 1896 to 1901 on a conviction for assault with intent to kill.

Armed with axes, guns, and a battering ram, a mob of 150 formed on the following day to lynch Tinsley, unaware that Sheriff Chris Kratz had already snuck him out to Vincennes. A larger mob threatened the jail again the next day. Despite being told that Tinsley was not there, the mob continued to besiege the jail. When a group of 20 to 30 armed black men marched towards the jail, the mob attacked black people, homes, and businesses. The next day, Governor Winfield T. Durbin deployed Evansville's company of the Indiana National Guard to protect the jail.

A mob of several thousand white people formed outside the Vanderburgh County Jail on July 6 and attempted to storm the jail. Those guarding the jail opened fire on the mob, killing and injuring several rioters. The crowd then began looting hardware stores of weapons and stormed into black neighborhoods in an attempt to expel black people from Evansville. The rioting continued until July 10 and a total of 13 people died during the riot, with more than 40 others seriously wounded and about 2,000 of Evansville's 8,000 black residents fleeing the city. Several accounts describe the escalation as coming to a head after a rock was thrown by someone in the crowd, at the militia, who in turn fired warning shots which caused chaos.

The people killed during the riot were:

- Edward Schiffman, 28, painter
- Hazel Allman, 15, killed while driving with her parents
- August Jordan, 21, musician
- Ed Ruhl, 23, laborer
- Joseph Tech "Peck", middle-aged
- Robert W. Bock, 24, (Originally thought to be H.E. Johnson)
- Fred Kappler, 18
- Frank Lamble, 23, stove molder
- John Barnett, 20
- John Geil
- Earnest Walters
- Charles Taylor, factory hand
- Calvin Hawkins, 26

== See also ==
- List of incidents of civil unrest in the United States
