= Omer Stokes Jackson =

Indiana Attorney General (1937–1940)

28th Indiana Attorney General
- In office January 1, 1937 – June 1, 1940
- Governor: Paul V. McNutt, M. Clifford Townsend
- Preceded by: Philip Lutz, Jr.
- Succeeded by: Samuel D. Jackson

Omer Stokes Jackson (September 1884 – June 1, 1940) was an American lawyer and politician who served as the twenty-eighth Indiana Attorney General from January 1, 1937, to June 1, 1940.

== Biography ==
=== Early life and education ===
Jackson was born in Hancock County, Indiana. His father was Stokes Jackson, a lawyer and former chairman of the Indiana Democratic Party.

Jackson graduated from high school in Greenfield. He attended Valparaiso University before entering Indiana University Bloomington, where he earned his legal degree from the Maurer School of Law.

Jackson practiced law with his father until the latter's death in 1916. Jackson also practiced law for over twenty years in Rushville as a partner of John B. Hinchman, a local judge who would later swear Jackson in as attorney general.

=== Political career ===
In 1911, State Attorney General Thomas M. Honan appointed Jackson to the office of second deputy AG. Honan's successor, Richard M. Milburn, retained Jackson, reappointing him to the same office.

Throughout the 1930s, Jackson worked his way up the ranks of the Indiana Democratic Party. In 1930, he was elected Democratic chairman of Hancock County. In 1933, he was elected Democratic chairman of Indiana's 11th District. In 1934, Jackson was elected chairman of the party, leading the Democrats to several key victories in the state throughout the rest of the decade. As chairman, Jackson helped to establish the party's first "colored bureau" and was known throughout his life as a friend to Black Hoosiers. Jackson resigned as chairman in 1939, amid criticism from those in his party that he was holding too many offices at once—in addition to his position as chairman, Jackson was also serving as state attorney general and as a member of the state election board.

In January 1937, shortly before the end of his term, Governor Paul V. McNutt appointed Jackson to serve as Indiana Attorney General, succeeding Philip Lutz, Jr. Jackson was the first attorney general to be appointed since the passage of the 1933 State Governmental Reorganization Law, which turned state attorney general from an elected to an appointed office (appointed by the governor). Jackson served the bulk of his term in the administration of Democratic Governor M. Clifford Townsend. James P. Hughes, former Justice of the Indiana Supreme Court, served as Assistant Attorney General under Jackson.

Jackson pushed Lieutenant Governor Henry F. Schricker to run for governor in the 1940 gubernatorial race. Schricker did run, and narrowly won the election.

=== Personal life and death ===
Jackson was married to Ellis Rock Jackson. They had a daughter, Dorothy June Williams.

In 1940, while traveling to his farm in Hancock County with his son-in-law, Jackson died suddenly of a heart attack, in the middle of his term. Governor Townsend appointed Samuel D. Jackson, former Allen County prosecutor, to succeed Jackson as attorney general.

Political offices
| Preceded by Philip Lutz, Jr. | Indiana Attorney General; 1937–1940 | Succeeded by Samuel D. Jackson |
