= Ele Stansbury =

American lawyer and politician (1861–1929)

23rd Indiana Attorney General
- In office January 1, 1917 – January 1, 1921
- Governor: Samuel M. Ralston, James P. Goodrich
- Preceded by: Evan B. Stotsenburg
- Succeeded by: U. S. Lesh

Ele Stansbury (February 8, 1861 - August 23, 1929) was an American lawyer and politician who served as the twenty-third Indiana Attorney General from January 1, 1917, to January 1, 1921.

== Biography ==
=== Early life and education ===
Stansbury was born in Saybrook, Illinois to John M. and Margaret Stansbury. The Stansburys were not a wealthy family, and after Margaret Stansbury's death, Ele (at age fifteen) had to get a job to support himself and pay his own way through school.

After attending common school in Saybrook, Stansbury moved with his family to Williamsport, Indiana in 1883. Stansbury attended high school in Williamsport. Reading law under John G. Pearson, Stansbury was admitted to the bar in 1887. In 1890, Stansbury founded a law office with a young lawyer, Frank Hanly, who would later go on to become Governor of Indiana from 1905 to 1907.

=== Political career ===
Starting in 1887, Stansbury, a Republican, served as deputy prosecuting attorney of Warren and Fountain counties, first under prosecutor Will B. Reed and then under James Bingham (who would later serve as Indiana Attorney General). He later served two terms as prosecuting attorney himself, elected to the office first in 1892 and then re-elected in 1894, becoming the first lawyer from Warren County to fill the position in twenty-six years. He also served as Warren county attorney for ten years, in addition to being the city attorney of Williamsport. Stansbury served as an elector in the 1900 presidential election, representing Indiana's Tenth District and casting his vote for William McKinley. From 1903 to 1905, he was a member of the Indiana House of Representatives, serving on the Committee on Fees and Salaries, the Ways and Means Committee, the Judiciary Committee, and the Employment Committee. He also was a trustee of the Indiana School for the Deaf in Indianapolis for eight years, appointed to the board in 1907 by his old law partner, Governor Hanly, and then reappointed by Governor Thomas R. Marshall.

In 1914, Stansbury was the Republican candidate in the election for Indiana Attorney General, but he was defeated by Democrat Richard M. Milburn. In 1917, Stansbury ran for Attorney General again and won, defeating Democratic incumbent Evan B. Stotsenburg (Milburn had died shortly after taking office). Stansbury served the bulk of his term in the administration of Governor James P. Goodrich, a fellow Republican. U. S. Lesh, a lawyer from Huntington, served as Assistant Attorney General under Stansbury. Willard Gemmill, a state senator from Marion, served as Special Deputy Attorney General under Stansbury for two years, before resigning to return to his private practice (Gemmill would become a Justice of the Indiana Supreme Court).

As Attorney General, Stansbury challenged the interpretation of a 1909 law that allowed public school officials to transfer students to private and parochial schools. Stansbury also challenged the abilities of country commissioners in Indiana to approve salary increases for school superintendents, declaring that the power to do so rested instead with town trustees.

Stansbury defended the Board of Election Commissioners of the City of Indianapolis in the controversial case of Board of Election Commissioners v. Knight, regarding a legal challenge by Indiana businessman William M. Knight to a partial women's suffrage law passed by the General Assembly. Stansbury attempted to defend the partial suffrage law from Knight's challenge in the Marion County Superior Court, but after the case was appealed to the Indiana Supreme Court, the law was declared unconstitutional, causing women in Indiana to lose the right to vote mere months after they had gained it. After the ruling, Stansbury urged the Woman's Franchise League of Indiana to campaign for an amendment to the Constitution of Indiana that granted women the right to vote.

Stansbury left office after four years, succeeded as Attorney General by Assistant AG Lesh.

=== Personal life and death ===
Stansbury was a Freemason, an Odd Fellow, a Knight of Pythias, and a member of the Columbia Club.

Stansbury married Ella Fisher, a teacher from Williamsport, in 1888. They had two children, a son (who practiced law with his father) and a daughter (who married Frank T. Stockton, Dean of the University of South Dakota).

Stansbury died in 1929.

Political offices
Preceded by Evan B. Stotsenburg	Indiana Attorney General; 1917-1921	Succeeded by U. S. Lesh
