= U. S. Lesh =

Indiana Attorney General, 1921–1925

Ulysses Samuel Lesh

24th Indiana Attorney General
- In office January 1, 1921 – January 1, 1925
- Governor: James P. Goodrich, Warren T. McCray, Emmett Forest Branch
- Preceded by: Ele Stansbury
- Succeeded by: Arthur L. Gilliom

Ulysses Samuel Lesh (August 9, 1868 – June 5, 1965) was an American lawyer, politician, and novelist who served as the twenty-fourth Indiana Attorney General from January 1, 1921, to January 1, 1925.

== Early life and education ==
Descended from Germans who immigrated to America in the early 18th century, Lesh was born on a farm in Rockcreek Township, Wells County, Indiana to Joseph and Sarah Lesh. After graduating from the University of Michigan Law School in Ann Arbor in 1891, Lesh moved to Huntington and practiced law there.

== Political career ==
Lesh, a Republican, was Huntington's city attorney from 1902 to 1904 and a county attorney for Huntington County from 1907 to 1909.

From 1917, he was Assistant Attorney General of Indiana under Ele Stansbury, whom he was elected to succeed as Indiana Attorney General in 1921. Lesh served the bulk of his term in the administration of Republican governor Warren T. McCray. As Attorney General, Lesh successfully made the Indiana State Fair a state agency. He also submitted a complaint against the Great Lakes Sand Company in the Lake County Circuit Court for illegally taking sand from Lake Michigan in the counties of Lake, Porter, and LaPorte; asking for an injunction and claiming that the company was liable to pay $50,000 (equivalent to $710,000 in 2025) in damages to the State of Indiana.

After leaving office, Lesh remained in Indianapolis, practicing law there with two of his sons until 1938. He then moved back to Huntington, practicing law with his younger brother Eben Lesh.

== Personal life and death ==
Lesh married Minnie Fulton in 1894. They had three sons; John, Lex, and Joseph.

Lesh also wrote two historical novels. His first novel, A Knight of the Golden Circle (published 1911), focuses on the actions of a secret society, the Knights of the Golden Circle, during the Civil War, and the famous Supreme Court case Ex parte Milligan. His second novel, Three Profiteers (published 1934), doubles as a narrative and an explanation of an economic theory. Running themes between both books include nostalgia for Indiana's pre-industrial era and the erosion of nature and its beauty by human activity and industry. Lesh also wrote The Three Guards, an educational play set during the American Revolution.

Lesh died in 1965.

Political offices
Preceded by Ele Stansbury	Indiana Attorney General; 1921–1925	Succeeded by Arthur L. Gilliom
