= Arthur L. Gilliom =

American lawyer and politician (1886–1968)

25th Indiana Attorney General
- In office January 1, 1925 – January 1, 1929
- Governor: Emmett Forest Branch, Edward L. Jackson
- Preceded by: U. S. Lesh
- Succeeded by: James M. Ogden

Arthur Luther Gilliom (August 2, 1886 - February 19, 1968) was an American lawyer and politician who served as the twenty-fifth Indiana Attorney General from January 1, 1925, to January 1, 1929.

== Biography ==
=== Early life and education ===
Gilliom was born in Hickory County, Missouri to Swiss farmers, Peter and Rachel (née Lehman) Gilliom. He was the tenth of their fourteen children.

After several crop failures, the Gillioms were forced to leave their Missouri home and go live with family in Berne, Indiana, when Arthur was just four years old. Growing up in the town until age twenty-one, Gilliom left home to attend college. From 1907 to 1910, he attended Goshen College. He then transferred to the University of Michigan Law School in Ann Arbor, graduating in 1913 with his LL.B. Soon after graduating, Gilliom was admitted to the Indiana and Michigan bars, and he moved to South Bend to practice law. Gilliom became increasingly involved in politics and worked as a campaign speaker.

=== Political career ===
In 1922, Gilliom was the Republican nominee in the local justice of the peace election, but he was defeated. Also in 1922, Gilliom tried to prevent the Ku Klux Klan from gaining a permit that would allow them to march through South Bend and helped to protect an official at a local school who was being targeted by the Klan. Gilliom would spend his whole career fighting the KKK, who were increasingly becoming a major force in state politics.

In 1923, Gilliom argued before the Indiana Supreme Court in a case involving the constitutionality of a new law regarding automobile licenses. The case earned Gilliom statewide fame. In 1924, he sought the Republican nomination in the election of the state attorney general. He won the nomination in an upset victory, defeating fellow Republican candidates Wilbur Ryman (a Klansman from Muncie who had the support of both the KKK and the Anti-Saloon League, another very powerful organization in 1920s state politics that allied itself with the Klan) and Edward M. White. Gilliom defeated his Democratic opponent, Harvey Harman, in the general election. Edward J. Lennon, a lawyer from Fort Wayne, served as Deputy Attorney General under Gilliom.

Succeeding Attorney General U. S. Lesh, Gilliom served in the administration of Governor Edward L. Jackson. Gilliom and Jackson were both Republicans, but Jackson was a supporter of the KKK and the Anti-Saloon League, leading to frequent clashes between the two. Early into his term, Gilliom came into conflict with the powerful leader of the Indiana Anti-Saloon League and KKK ally, Edward Shumaker, after Shumaker began spreading libelous information about the Indiana Supreme Court. Gilliom charged Shumaker with contempt of court and he was sentenced to a short prison term. Governor Jackson, an ally of Shumaker's, tried to pardon him, but the Indiana Supreme Court blocked the pardon from taking effect. Gilliom again provoked the ire of the state's temperance movement when he attacked strict state laws restricting the prescription of alcohol for medicinal use. In a 1927 open letter to Governor Jackson, Gilliom revealed to the public that he had illegally procured and gave his sons whiskey on the recommendation of his physician while his sons were suffering from typhoid and pneumonia. Gilliom also revealed in the letter that Governor Jackson had approached him about illegally procuring alcohol for his wife, who was also suffering from pneumonia. Later that year, Gilliom admitted he had illegally procured alcohol again for his ill sister. These sensational reveals caused organizations like the Women's Christian Temperance Union to again attack Gilliom. Some called for his arrest, but a grand jury refused to indict him. In 1928, Gilliom filed a lawsuit against the KKK with the goal of forcing the Klan out of Indiana altogether. The KKK had already lost much of its power and influence following the widely publicized rape and murder of Madge Oberholtzer by Indiana Klan leader D.C. Stephenson. Gilliom was succeeded in 1928 by James M. Ogden.

Gilliom sought the Republican nomination in the 1928 U.S. Senate election in Indiana, but was defeated by the incumbent Arthur Raymond Robinson.

Gilliom returned to practicing law after leaving office and losing the Senate election. He joined the firm of Pickens, Davidson, Gause, and Pickens in Indianapolis.

=== Personal life and death ===
Gilliom was a Freemason, a Knight of Pythias, and a member of the South Bend Chamber of Commerce.

Gilliom married Nancy B. Kulp of Elkhart in 1912. They had four children; Elbert, Luther, Arthur, and Richard.

Gilliom died in 1968.

Political offices
Preceded by U. S. Lesh	Indiana Attorney General; 1925-1929	Succeeded by James M. Ogden
