= Richard M. Milburn =

American lawyer and politician (1866–1915)

21st Indiana Attorney General
- In office January 1, 1915 – November 9, 1915
- Governor: Samuel M. Ralston
- Preceded by: Thomas M. Honan
- Succeeded by: Evan B. Stotsenburg

Richard M. Milburn (September 24, 1866 – November 9, 1915) was an American lawyer and politician who served as the twenty-first Indiana Attorney General from January 1, 1915, to November 9, 1915.

== Biography ==
=== Early life and education ===
Sources disagree about whether Milburn was born in Portersville, Dubois County, Indiana or in neighboring Daviess County, Indiana. Previous generations of the Milburn family lived in Virginia, then Tennessee, and then Kentucky, where Milburn's father, Richard F. Milburn, was born. After Richard F. was born, the family moved again to Dubois County.

Richard M. Milburn attended public school in Daviess County before attending Indiana State University in Terre Haute, graduating from the school in 1881. He also attended Indiana University (in Bloomington, Indiana), Cumberland University (in Lebanon, Tennessee), and Columbia Law School (in New York City). He returned to Dubois County and settled in Jasper following the conclusion of his education. Milburn was admitted to the bar in 1888.

=== Political career ===
Milburn, a Democrat, served as county attorney of Dubois County from 1903 to 1905.

Milburn served in the Indiana Senate, representing Daviess and Dubois counties.

Milburn was elected Indiana Attorney General in 1914, defeating Republican candidate Ele Stansbury. He served in the administration of Democratic Governor Samuel M. Ralston. He appointed Horace M. Kean (from Jasper) as assistant attorney general, Roy Naftzger (from Muncie) as deputy attorney general, Michael A. Sweeney (from Jasper, Milburn's law partner) as traveling deputy, Omer Stokes Jackson (of Greenfield, later Indiana Attorney General himself, the only one of former AG Thomas M. Honan's appointments retained by Milburn) as second deputy, Edna Wickens (of Indianapolis) as stenographer, and Wilbur T. Gruber (of Lafayette) as deputy stenographer. As Attorney General, Milburn spoke at a session of the Indiana State Board of Health about state insanity laws. Milburn also helped to modify a notable 1910 injunction against fire insurance companies operating within Indiana.

=== Personal life and death ===
Milburn taught law for twelve years at Indiana University in Bloomington.

Milburn was a cousin of Carl M. Gray, a state senator and noted jurist who made many important contributions to Indiana law. Milburn inspired Gray to become a lawyer after Gray attended a murder trial where Milburn was part of the defense team.

Less than a year into his term as Attorney General, Milburn grew ill and died in November 1915.

Political offices
Preceded by Thomas M. Honan	Indiana Attorney General; 1915-1915	Succeeded by Evan B. Stotsenburg
