= Philip Lutz Jr. =

American lawyer and politician (1888–1947)

27th Indiana Attorney General
- In office January 1, 1933 – January 1, 1937
- Governor: Harry G. Leslie, Paul V. McNutt
- Preceded by: James M. Ogden
- Succeeded by: Omer Stokes Jackson

Personal details
- Education: Indiana University Bloomington

Philip C. Lutz Jr. (August 28, 1888 – May 22, 1947) was an American lawyer and politician who served as the twenty-seventh Indiana Attorney General from January 1, 1933, to January 1, 1937.

== Biography ==
=== Early life and education ===
Lutz was born in Boonville, Indiana.

Lutz attended Indiana University in Bloomington, receiving both his BA and his LL.B. from the school. In addition to his legal career, Lutz ran a peony farm in Boonville.

=== Political career ===
Lutz, a Democrat, served as a clerk of the Indiana General Assembly in the 1911 and 1913 legislative sessions. In 1915, he served as a member of the Indiana House of Representatives, representing Warrick County. In 1916, Lutz became juvenile judge of Warrick County.

In 1932, Lutz was elected to succeed James M. Ogden as Indiana Attorney General. He served his term in the administration of Democratic Governor Paul V. McNutt. In 1934, Lutz was involved with the extradition of John Dillinger from Tucson, Arizona back to Indiana. Dillinger would be placed in Lake County Jail in Crown Point, but would later escape and die months later in a shootout in Chicago. Lutz successfully defended a law that fixed the price of milk before the U.S. Supreme Court following a legal challenge by the Kroger Grocery & Baking Company in 1936. Lutz also issued a number of opinions related to Indiana medical law, setting limits on who can practice podiatry in the state of Indiana and deciding that mental asylum officials could perform sexual sterilizations with a court order. Lutz also issued an unofficial opinion stating that township trustees were still responsible for temporary medical care of those in poverty, even as Governor McNutt was reforming welfare in the state in the era of the New Deal. Lutz was succeeded to the office by Omer Stokes Jackson.

=== Personal life and death ===
Lutz was involved with the erection and dedication of a historical marker in Boonville, commemorating Abraham Lincoln’s connection to the town. On July 4th, 1935, Lutz gave a patriotic address in Rockport at the dedication ceremony of the Lincoln Pioneer Village.

Lutz died of a heart attack in 1947.

Political offices
Preceded by James M. Ogden	Indiana Attorney General; 1933-1937	Succeeded by Omer Stokes Jackson
