= James Cameron (activist) =

American civil rights advocate (1914–2006)

- Born: February 15, 1914; La Crosse, Wisconsin, U.S.
- Died: June 11, 2006 (aged 92); Milwaukee, Wisconsin, U.S.
- Occupation: Political activist
- Years active: 1940–2006
- Known for: Surviving an attempted lynching
- Notable work: Founding America's Black Holocaust Museum
- Spouse: Virginia Hamiliton (m. 1938)
- Children: 5

James Cameron (February 25, 1914 – June 11, 2006) was an American civil rights activist. In the 1940s, he founded three chapters of the National Association for the Advancement of Colored People (NAACP) in Indiana. He also served as Indiana's State Director of the Office of Civil Liberties from 1942 to 1950.

In the 1950s he moved with his family to Milwaukee, Wisconsin, where he continued as an activist and started speaking on African-American history. In 1988 he founded America's Black Holocaust Museum in the city, devoted to African-American history from slavery to the present.

Cameron was a survivor of a lynching attempt, which occurred when he was a 16-year-old suspect in a murder/robbery case in Marion, Indiana; two older teenagers were killed by the mob.

== Early life and education ==
Cameron was born February 25, 1914, in La Crosse, Wisconsin, to James Herbert Cameron and Vera Carter. After his father left the family, they moved to Birmingham, Alabama, and then to Marion, Indiana. When James was 14, his mother remarried.

=== Arrest and attempted lynching ===
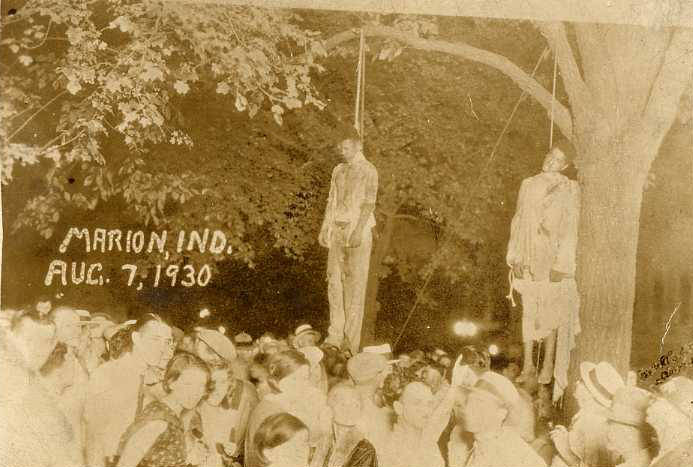
Thomas Shipp and Abram Smith, lynched August 7, 1930, in Marion, Indiana

On August 7, 1930, when Cameron was 16 years old, he had gone out to play horseshoes before getting in a 1926 Ford Roadster driven by teenager Thomas Shipp, who soon picked up another teenager, Abram Smith. People said they attempted to rob a young white man, Claude Deeter, and killed him. Initial reports said that Shipp and Smith raped Deeter's fiancée, Mary Ball. Cameron said he ran away before the man was killed, and Ball could not identify him as one of the attackers.

The three youths were caught quickly, arrested, and charged the same night with robbery, murder and rape. A lynch mob broke into the jail where Cameron and his two friends were being held. According to Cameron's account, a lynch mob of 12,000–15,000 at the Grant County Courthouse Square took all three youths from the jail. The lynch mob killed the older two first: they took Shipp out of the cell and beat him, and hanged him from the bars of his jail window; Smith was dead from beating before the mob hanged both the boys from a tree in the square. The mob beat Cameron and put a noose around his neck; before he was hanged, the voice of an unidentified woman intervened, saying that he was innocent. The rope scarred Cameron's neck; years later, he bought a piece of it. The crowd parted ways and let Cameron stumble back to the jail.

Flossie Bailey, a local NAACP official, and the State Attorney General worked to gain indictments against leaders of the mob in the lynchings. A total of eight people were indicted for the lynching. However, all of the cases were dropped after two of the defendants were acquitted.

In 1931, Cameron was tried for being an accessory before the fact to the murder of Deeter. He was convicted on a lesser count of being an accessory before the fact to manslaughter and sentenced to two to 21 years in prison. He served four years at the Indiana State Prison before being paroled in 1935. Afterwards, Cameron moved to Detroit, Michigan, where he worked at Stroh Brewery Company and attended Wayne State University.

In 1993, Governor Evan Bayh pardoned Cameron, who said his confession that he had held Ball while Smith raped her had been beaten out of him.

== Career ==
Cameron studied at Wayne State University to become a boiler engineer and worked in that field until he was 65. At the same time, he continued to study lynchings, race, and civil rights in America and trying to teach others.

Because of his personal experience, Cameron dedicated his life to promoting civil rights, racial unity, and equality. While he worked in a variety of jobs in Indiana during the 1940s, he founded three chapters of the National Association for the Advancement of Colored People (NAACP). This was a period when the Ku Klux Klan was still active in the Midwest, although its numbers had decreased since its peak in the 1920s. Cameron established and became the first president of the NAACP Madison County chapter in Anderson, Indiana.

He also served as the Indiana State Director of Civil Liberties from 1942 to 1950. In this capacity, Cameron reported to Governor of Indiana Henry Schricker on violations of the "equal accommodations" laws designed to end segregation. During his eight-year tenure, Cameron investigated more than 25 incidents of civil rights infractions. He faced violence and death threats because of his work.

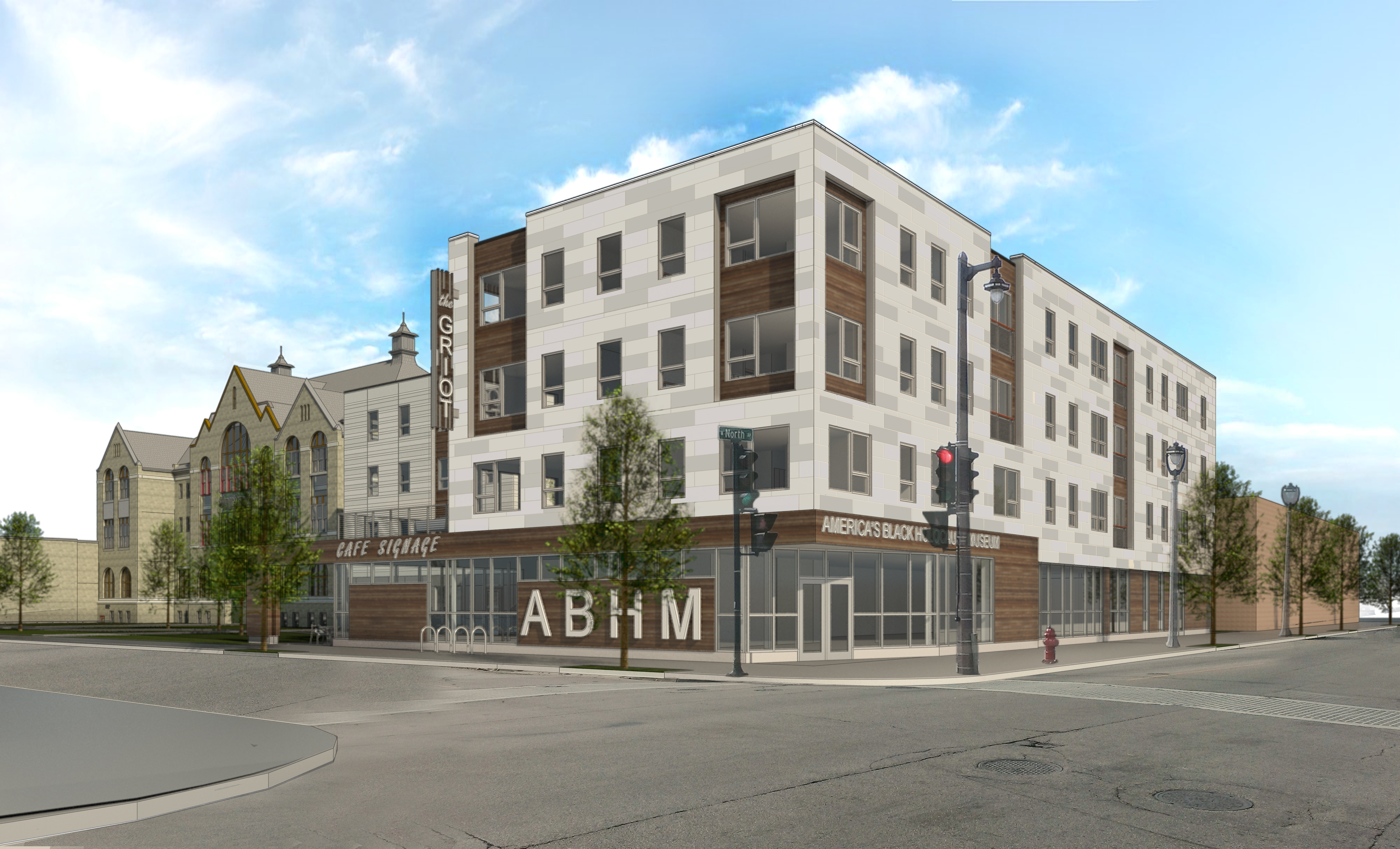

=== Civil rights activism ===
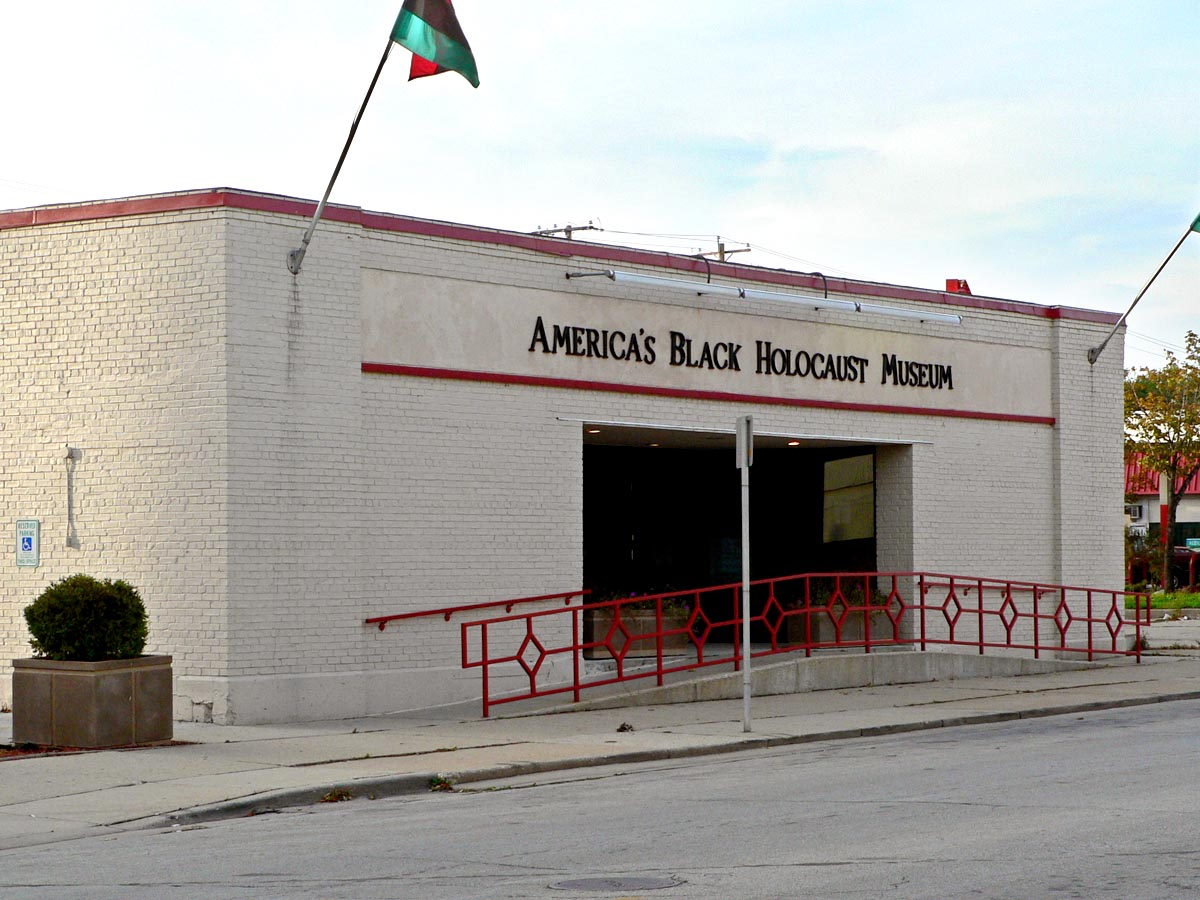
America's Black Holocaust Museum

By the early 1950s, the emotional toll of threats led Cameron to search for a safer home for his wife and five children. Planning to move to Canada, they decided on Milwaukee when he found work there. There Cameron continued his work in civil rights by assisting in protests to end segregated housing in the city. He also participated in two marches on Washington in the 1960s, the 1963 March on Washington for Jobs and Freedom and the 1968 Solidarity Day, part of the Poor People's Campaign.

Cameron studied history on his own and lectured on the African-American experience. From 1955 to 1989 he published hundreds of articles and booklets detailing civil rights and occurrences of racial injustices, including "What is Equality in American Life?"; "The Lingering Problem of Reconstruction in American Life: Black Suffrage"; and "The Second Civil Rights Bill". In 1982 he published his memoir, A Time of Terror: A Survivor's Story.

=== America's Black Holocaust Museum ===
After being inspired by a visit with his wife to the Yad Vashem memorial in Israel, Cameron founded America's Black Holocaust Museum in 1988. He used material from his collections to document the struggles of African Americans in the United States, from slavery through lynchings, and the 20th-century civil rights movement. When he first started collecting materials about slavery, he kept it in his basement. Working with others to build support for the museum, he was aided by philanthropist Daniel Bader.

The museum started as a grassroots effort and became one of the largest African-American museums in the country. In 2008, the museum closed because of financial problems. It reopened on Cameron's birthday, February 25, 2012, as a virtual museum. It reopened as a physical museum on February 25, 2022.

== Personal life ==
Cameron and his wife, Virginia Hamilton, had five children. By age 88, he had become a great-grandfather, undergone heart surgery, battled cancer, and had scars on his neck from the attempted lynching in 1930. He died on June 11, 2006, at the age of 92, from congestive heart failure. He was a devout Catholic and is buried at Holy Cross Cemetery in Milwaukee. Two sons, David and James, had died before him.

== Legacy and honors ==
- PBS Wisconsin produced a documentary entitled A Lynching in Marion.
- Marion, Indiana, presented Cameron with a key to the city.
- Cameron was interviewed by BBC, and Dutch and German television.
- In 1999 Cameron was awarded an honorary doctorate by the University of Wisconsin–Milwaukee.
- Milwaukee added his name to four blocks of West North Avenue, from North King Drive to North 7th Street.

== Published works ==
- Cameron, James (1994) [Originally self-published in 1982]. A Time of Terror: A Survivor's Story. Black Classics Press. ISBN 978-0996576901.
