= James M. Ogden =

American lawyer and politician (1870–1956)

26th Indiana Attorney General
- In office January 1, 1929 – January 1, 1933
- Governor: Edward L. Jackson, Harry G. Leslie
- Preceded by: Arthur L. Gilliom
- Succeeded by: Philip Lutz Jr.

Personal details
- Born: James Matlock Ogden; April 5, 1870 Danville, Indiana
- Died: November 11, 1956 (aged 86)
- Party: Republican
- Spouse: Alice Bell Dean
- Children: Mary Ann Parrish
- Education: DePauw University; Harvard Law School

James Matlock Ogden (April 5, 1870 – November 11, 1956) was an American lawyer and Republican politician who served as the twenty-sixth Indiana Attorney General from January 1, 1929, to January 1, 1933.

== Early life and education ==
Ogden was born in Danville, Indiana.

Ogden attended DePauw University in Greencastle, graduating in 1894 with a PhB. He then attended Harvard Law School in Cambridge, Massachusetts, graduating in 1899 with a LL.B.

== Career ==
After his graduation from Harvard, Ogden moved to Kendallville, where he became a teacher and eventually a principal at Kendallville High School from 1894 to 1896. In 1899, he moved to Indianapolis and began to practice law.

Starting in 1900, Ogden taught at the Indiana Law School in Indianapolis. He wrote the book, Ogden's Negotiable Instruments. Ogden was a member of the Indiana State Bar Association and the Indianapolis Bar Association. He served as vice president of the American Bar Association, and state president of the Epworth League in 1903.

=== Political career ===
Ogden, a Republican, served as city attorney of Indianapolis. From 1924 to 1926, he served as counsel to the city corporation.

Ogden was elected Indiana Attorney General in 1928, succeeding Arthur L. Gilliom. Ogden served his term in the administration of Republican Governor Harry G. Leslie. As Attorney General, Ogden oversaw changes in Indiana banking laws. Ogden also oversaw an investigation into an infamous lynching of two African American teenagers in Marion in 1930 (see Lynching of Thomas Shipp and Abram Smith). Twelve white men were put on trial for the crime, but they were all quickly found innocent. Ogden appointed his old friend from law school, Robert L. Bailey, to the office of Assistant Attorney General. This appointment was notable because Bailey was a Black man from Alabama. In 1933, Ogden served as president of the National Association of Attorneys General. Ogden was succeeded by Philip Lutz Jr.

=== Later life ===
Ogden was a member of DePauw University's Board of Trustees and the university's alumni association. DePauw bestowed an honorary LL.D. degree on Ogden in 1952.

== Personal life ==
Ogden married Alice Bell Dean of Danville. They had a daughter, Mary Ann Parrish.

Ogden, a Presbyterian, died on November 11, 1956.

Political offices
Preceded by Arthur L. Gilliom	Indiana Attorney General; 1929-1933	Succeeded by Philip Lutz Jr.
