= Whitecapping =

Vigilante violence against minorities in the 1800s US

Whitecapping was a violent vigilante movement of farmers in the United States during the late 19th and early 20th centuries. It was originally a ritualized form of extralegal actions to enforce community standards, appropriate behavior, and traditional rights. However, as it spread throughout the poorest areas of the rural South after the Civil War, white members operated from economically driven, anti-black, and anti-Mexican biases. States enacted laws against it, but whitecapping continued into the early 20th century.

After it was institutionalized in formal law, its legal definition became more general than the specific movement itself: "Whitecapping is the crime of threatening a person with violence. Ordinarily, members of the minority groups are the victims of whitecapping."

Whitecapping was associated historically with such insurgent groups as The Night Riders, Bald Knobbers, and the Ku Klux Klan. They were known for committing "extralegal acts of violence targeting select groups, carried out by vigilantes under cover of night or disguise."

== History ==
The Whitecapping movement started in Indiana around 1837, as white males began forming secret societies in order to attempt to deliver what they considered justice on the American frontier, independent from the state. These groups became known as the "White Caps". The first White Cap operations generally aimed at those who went against a community's values. Men who neglected or abused their family, people who showed excessive laziness, and women who had children out of wedlock all were likely targets.

As whitecapping spread into the Southern states during the 1890s after Reconstruction, a period of increasing racial violence against blacks by whites, the targets changed. In the South, White Cap societies were generally made up of poor-white farmers, frequently sharecroppers and small landowners, who operated to control black laborers and to prevent merchants from acquiring more land. In the South, Whitecaps tried to force victims to abandon their home or property. Whitecapping in the South is thought to have been related to the stresses of the Reconstruction Era agricultural depression that occurred immediately after the Civil War. The South had issues with overproduction and falling crop prices. With attention centered on producing cotton, the South's economy became very unbalanced. Many farmers went into debt and lost their lands to merchants through mortgage foreclosures.

The dispossessed turned on merchants, African-American laborers, and sometimes new white tenants. Racism contributed to the problem as well. Prosperous black men, or simply African Americans who acquired land in the South, frequently faced resentment that could be expressed violently. White Caps were also part of the effort by whites to maintain white supremacy, particularly in the economy. Mexican Americans were also victims of whitecapping, particularly in the state of Texas.

Many White Cap societies were disbanded by 1894 and their members were punished with fines. Some state governments were determined to disband the White Cap societies operating in their regions. While a segregationist, Mississippi Governor James K. Vardaman assembled an executive task force in 1904 in order to gather information about membership. He feared that the violence would drive too many black workers away from the state economy, as the number of lynchings was also high in the state. Active members of the Whitecaps were found and punished by states in the early 1900s. Though the negative economic effects of whitecapping violence were the main reason for state response to the lawlessness, political leaders often expressed values of Christianity as the main reason to end whitecapping.

In Oklahoma, both white and black settlers migrated to Oklahoma Territory after its creation and opening for settlement in 1890, with black migrant leaders such as Edward P. McCabe proclaiming Oklahoma as a new opportunity to escape racism from elsewhere in the South. After the initial wave of settlement, tensions eventually rose, especially in mixed-race towns. Whitecappers would threaten violence and encourage blacks in mixed-race areas to move out, as well as threaten black farmers who were seen as controlling too much land and competing with white farmers. As a result, Oklahoma became quite segregated, with some formerly mixed towns becoming all-white; black residents generally lived in all-black towns. Popular history and perception of the state generally omitted its black residents, especially during the 20th century, portraying only whites and American Indians due to the whitecappers' successful campaign to push black life away from view in most of the state.

Over many years, whitecapping not only affected individuals, but communities and counties as a whole. In the South, whitecapping discouraged many merchants and industrialists from doing business in the counties. Added to the thousands of murders committed by whites in lynchings of blacks, whitecapping threatened to drive away black laborers. Beginning around the time of World War I, tens of thousands of rural blacks began to leave in the Great Migration, with 1.5 million leaving for northern and midwestern industrial cities by 1940.

In the late twentieth century, whitecapping continued to be an issue in the South: Mississippi passed an edentulous statute criminalizing its practice in 1972. The statute reads as follows:

Any person or persons who shall, by placards, or other writing, or verbally, attempt by threats, direct or implied, of injury to the person or property of another, to intimidate such other person into an abandonment or change of home or employment, shall, upon conviction, be fined not exceeding five hundred dollars, or imprisoned in the county jail not exceeding six months, or in the penitentiary not exceeding five years, as the court, in its discretion may determine.

== Methodology ==
Despite the different whitecapping targets, the White Caps used similar methods. Generally, the members of this society were disguised in a way that somewhat resembled that of the Ku Klux Klan (KKK), and always attacked at night. Physical attacks could include such things as whipping, drowning, firing shots into houses, arson, and other brutalities, with whipping and threats constituting the majority of the tactics used against victims. The White Caps also used intimidation to force certain residents from their homes. These included posting signs on doors of blacks' and merchants' homes, as well as cornering a target and verbally threatening them. If a resident or witness to a crime did not abandon their homes after being terrorized, White Caps sometimes murdered them.

The victims of these attacks had little support from the legal authorities until 1893, when the threat from whitecapping began to be taken more seriously. But, even if suspects were prosecuted, local officials had difficulty clearing juries of White Cap members or sympathizers. In addition to white bias against black victims, part of the White Cap oath was to never help convict a fellow member.

Some members of the White Caps had elite connections to defense attorneys in their state, who aided them in avoiding harsher sentences in court. In the case of Hodges v. United States, the defendants' attorneys were the lieutenant governor and a candidate running for state prosecutor. Defendants were convicted, but sentenced only to one year and a day in prison, along with a $100 fine. The penalty for violating the blood oath of the White Caps was death. In some states, whitecapping societies were interconnected throughout the region. Members could call on members from another county to terrorize witnesses of crimes as a scare tactic.

== See also ==
- Indiana White Caps
- Ku Klux Klan
- The Night Riders
- Bald Knobbers
- Vigilantism in the United States of America
