= James A. Mount =

American politician

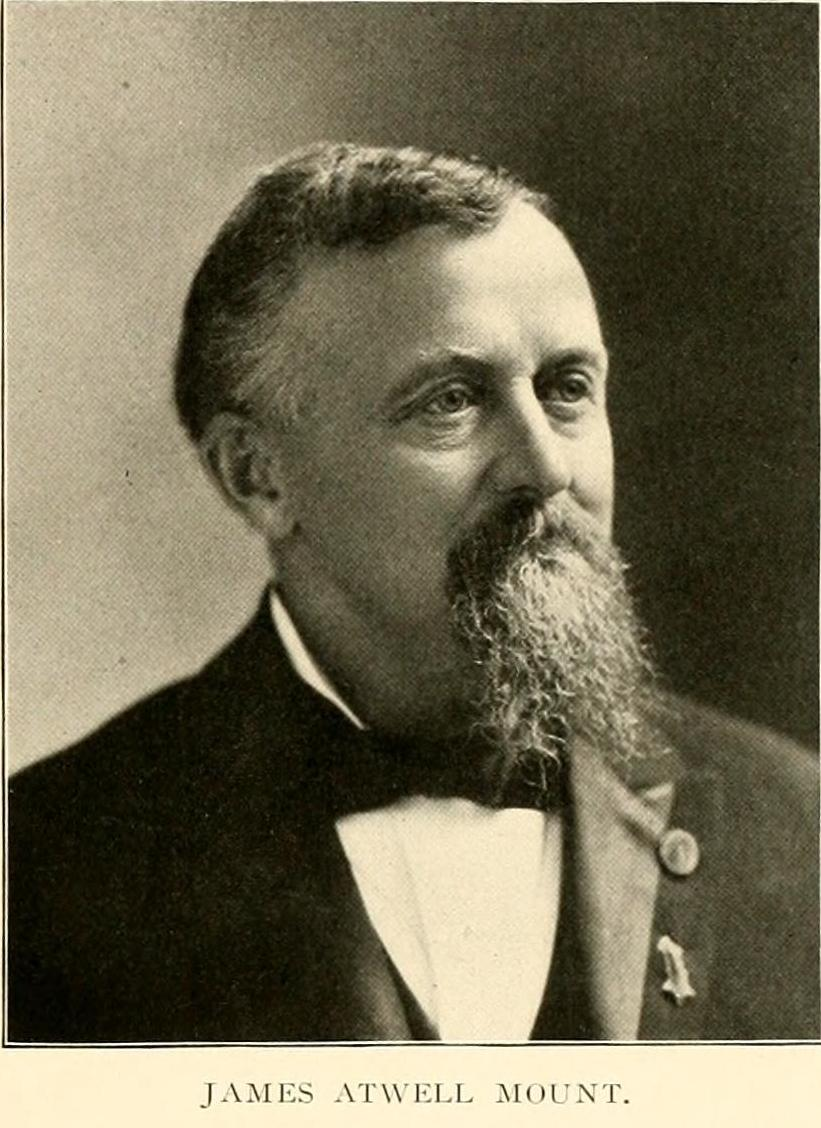

24th Governor of Indiana
- In office January 11, 1897 – January 14, 1901
- Lieutenant: William S. Haggard
- Preceded by: Claude Matthews
- Succeeded by: Winfield T. Durbin

Member of the Indiana State Senate
- In office 1888–1892

Personal details
- Born: March 24, 1843 Montgomery County, Indiana, U.S.
- Died: January 16, 1901 (aged 57) Indianapolis, Indiana, U.S.
- Party: Republican
- Spouse: Catherine Boyd

Military service
- Allegiance: United States
- Branch/service: United States Army
- Years of service: 1862–1865
- Rank: Sergeant
- Unit: 72nd Regiment Indiana Infantry
- Battles/wars: American Civil War: Battle of Chickamauga; Siege of Atlanta; Sherman's march to the sea

James Atwell Mount (March 24, 1843 – January 16, 1901) was an American politician serving as the 24th governor of Indiana from 1897 to 1901. His term coincided with the economic recovery following the Panic of 1893, and focused primarily on industrial regulations and advancement of agriculture. As governor during the Spanish–American War, he oversaw the formation as dispatch of the state levies and played an important role in changing national policy to allow African Americans to serve as army officers.

== Early life ==
James Atwell Mount was born in Montgomery County, Indiana, on March 24, 1843, one of the twelve children of Atwell and Lucinda Fullenwider Mount. He received little formal education during the winter months when no farming could be conducted, and spent most of his youth working on his family's farm, and clearing land for use as pasture and fields.

=== American Civil War ===
He enlisted in the Union Army on 22 July 1862, during the height of the American Civil War, and was assigned to D Company of the 72nd Indiana Infantry. His regiment was part of the famous Lightning Brigade commanded by John T. Wilder. Mount gained a reputation for leadership, valor, and bravery, and twice volunteered for charges against superior forces during the Battle of Chickamauga during September 1863.

He remained in the service for the duration of the war and served primarily as a scout and skirmisher. During Sherman's march to the sea he was one of the leading scouts of the army, and was the first Union soldier to enter Georgia. He remained with the army throughout its destructive march across the state, and participated in the widespread scorched earth tactics of the campaign. He was promoted during his service for his demonstrated leadership and mustered out as a sergeant in D Company on 24 July 1865.

=== Farming ===
After the war ended, Mount returned to Indiana in 1865 where he used the money he had earned as a soldier to pay for schooling. He attend the Presbyterian Academy in Boone County and received a classical education. While in school he met Kate Byrd, who became one of his closest friends. He only had funds to complete one year at the university, and returned to his family's farm. Kate and Mount continued their relationship and fell in love, marrying after she graduated in 1867. The couple rented a small run-down house and farm in Montgomery County and began to work it. After working the farm for several years they were able to save enough to purchase it and all of its equipment. They soon had three children who grew to help them on the growing farm. They purchased neighboring land, eventually owning over 500 acres (200 ha) and building a new large home. He called the estate Willow Brook.

Mount was known for his business acumen in the community and was very good at predicting the most profitable times to sell crops. In his spare time, he would lecture and teach at a county agricultural school to help other farmers learn advanced farming techniques and methods to get the greatest income from their crop sales, primarily through marketing timing and group negotiations. Mount became instrumental in the formation of several farming co-ops and became well known in the region.

== Political career ==
=== State senator ===
Mount had been approached several times to run for public office by the Republican Party, to which he belonged, but had always refused. In 1888 he was nominated to run for the Indiana State Senate, despite his protests. The party at that time was losing farming votes to the Populist Party, and bringing farmers to the ticket was seen as a way to reverse the trend. He reluctantly accepted the nomination expecting to lose, but won the election in an ordinarily Democratic-controlled district. In the Democratic-controlled Senate he submitted no legislation of his own, but did support several measures he believed would benefit the farming community, including increasing funding for state agricultural programs.

In 1890, his party nominated him to run for Congress, again against his wishes. He again reluctantly accepting, believing he would be defeated and not have to serve in the office. He was overwhelmingly defeated in the election, finished out his two remaining years as a state senator, and returned to his farm in 1892. The following year the nation was adversely affected by the Panic of 1893, leading to a collapse of farm and produce value. Across the state, farmers began to lose their land to their lenders. The following year in the 1894 mid-term elections the Republicans swept to power in the statehouse, and took control of the Indiana General Assembly. As a farmer, Mount was also affected by the economic downturn and decided a return to politics was the best way he could help the situation.

=== Governor ===
Mount sought his party's nomination for governor, and won, being aided by his farming background which was believed to give him an edge in the campaign. The primary issue of the campaign was national, the unlimited coinage of silver money, which would cause inflation, which farmers believed would alleviate their financial problems. Although the issue could only be resolved at the federal level, it dominated the state campaign as well, and Mount openly supported the measure. Mount won the election by plurality, defeating the Democratic candidate Benjamin by over 26,000 votes.

Mount had become president of the State Horse Thief Detective Association in 1892. It was a vigilante group that privately defended country farmers, leading him to change the policy of recent Governors who were attempting to suppress such white cap groups. Although he actively sought the governor's seat, he soon came to dislike it and wanted to leave office. Mount's primary dislike from the job arose from the constant lobbying of individuals for patronage jobs and party leaders' demands. Several progressive agenda items were enacted during his term, including compulsive school attendance laws, requiring all children between age eight and fourteen attend school. Anti-trust laws, a number of industry regulations on worker health and safety, and food and drug quality were also passed during his term.

The economy began to recover shortly after his term began, increasing state revenues and taking pressure off of the government. A coal miners strike was still continuing when his term began, so he dispatched two commissioners to determine the problems who successfully ended the strike with promises of regulatory reform. Mount's primary concern remained to be the farming community. He advocated granting more power to the state agricultural department. Among the authority it was granted was the ability to enforce quarantines on diseased farm animals, the ability to inspect farms for disease, and promotion of fruit crops.

The Spanish–American War began during the second half of Mount's term, and he was responsible for preparing the Indiana's levies. Indiana had maintained regiments of black troops since the Civil War, and Mount activated two of their companies to serve in the new conflict. The United States War Department refused to accept them unless they were commanded by white officers, leading to a dispute with Mount. Most blacks in Indiana were Republican at the time, and the party did not want to alienate them given the recent string of close elections. Mount objected strongly to the War Department demand and enlisted the support of Indiana's senator, Charles W. Fairbanks. Mount and Fairbanks both spoke with President McKinley to demand that he allow the blacks companies to be commanded by black officers. McKinley complied, making the first steps towards the racial equality and integration of the United States Army.

Mount received national attention in the last year of his term when he refused to extradite William S. Taylor to Kentucky. Taylor was a Republican candidate for Governor of Kentucky in the 1899 election, and was believed to have been involved in the murder of his Democratic opponent after making accusations of vote fraud. Mount ordered state police to protect Taylor who remained in Indiana for the rest of his life.

Mount left office on January 14, 1901, and was relieved and happy to return to his farm. In his farewell speech he called it the happiest day of his life. Two days later, January 16, as he was preparing to leave the capitol and return home, he died of a heart attack in his Indianapolis apartment. His body lay in state for three days before he was returned to be buried in Oak Hill Cemetery in Crawfordsville, Indiana.

== Electoral history ==
Indiana election, 1896
Party	Candidate	Votes	%
Republican	James Mount	321,032	47.7
Democratic	Benjamin F. Shively	294,855	47.0
Populist	Thomas Wadsworth	8,525	1.4
Prohibition	Riley F. Hicks	2,996	0.5

== See also ==
- List of governors of Indiana
- Indiana White Caps

== Bibliography ==
- Gugin, Linda C.; St. Clair, James E, eds. (2006). The Governors of Indiana. Indianapolis, Indiana: Indiana Historical Society Press. ISBN 0-87195-196-7.
- Terrell, William Henry Harrison, Adjutant General (1866). Roster of Enlisted Men [incl.] Indiana Regiments Sixtieth to One Hundred and Tenth 1861-1865 (PDF). Report of the Adjutant General of the State of Indiana. Vol. VI. Indianapolis, IN: Samuel R. Douglas, State Printer. p. 169. OCLC 558004259.

Party political offices
Preceded by Ira Joy Chase	Republican nominee for Governor of Indiana; 1896	Succeeded by Winfield T. Durbin
Political offices
Preceded by Claude Matthews	Governor of Indiana; January 11, 1897 – January 14, 1901	Succeeded by Winfield T. Durbin
