= Lynching of Thomas Shipp and Abram Smith =

1930 lynching of African-American prisoners in Marion, Indiana

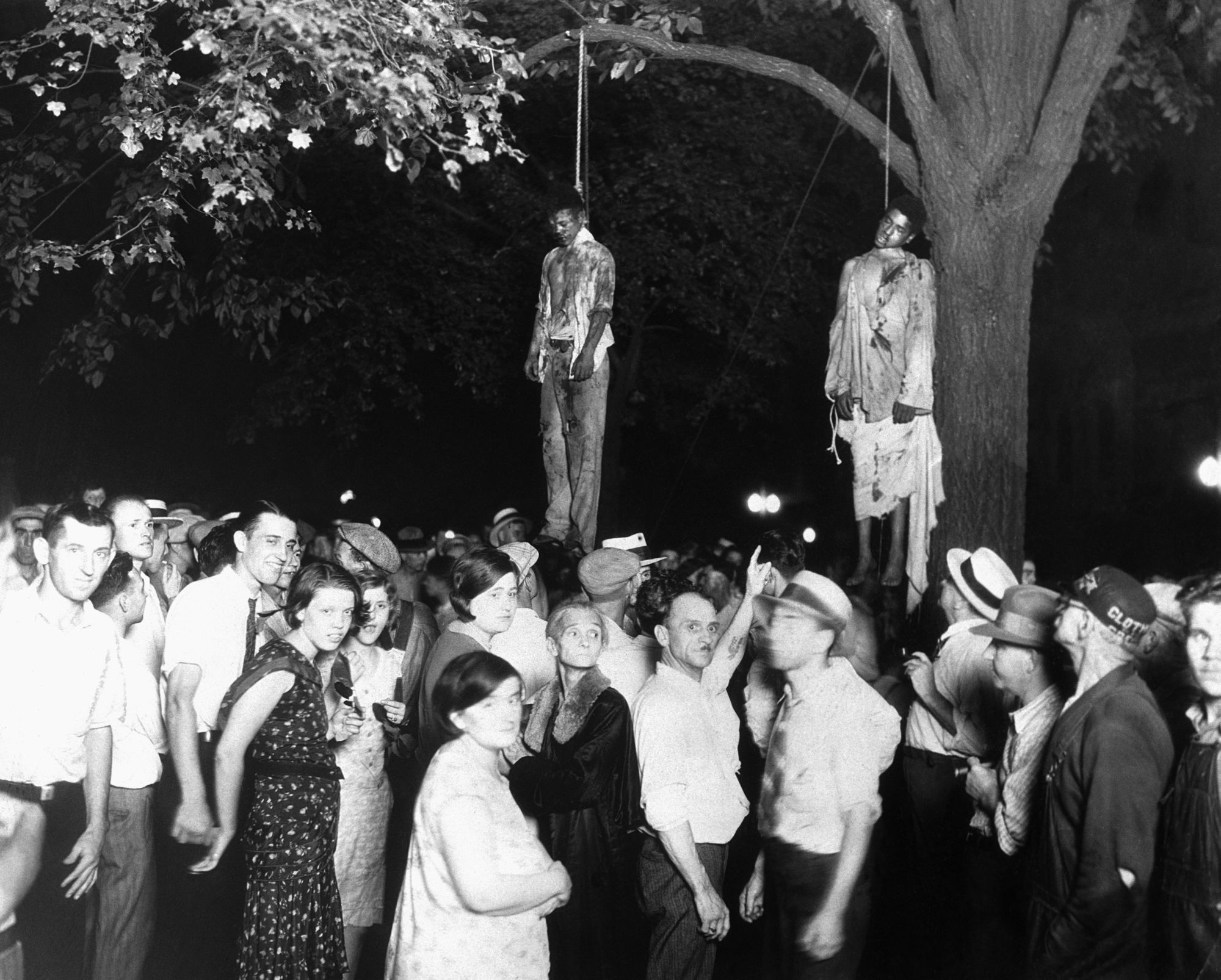
Lynching of Thomas Shipp and Abram Smith

J. Thomas Shipp (March 1, 1911 – August 7, 1930) and Abraham S. Smith (October 14, 1910 – August 7, 1930) were two young African-American men who were murdered in a spectacle lynching by a group of thousands on August 7, 1930, in Marion, Indiana. They were taken out from their jail cells, beaten, and hanged from a tree in the county courthouse square. They had been arrested that night as suspects in the attack of a white couple. They were accused of robbing and murdering Claude Deeter, 24 years old, and raping his fiancée, Mary Ball, 18. A third African-American suspect, 16-year-old James Cameron, was also arrested and taken by the mob, but narrowly escaped the same fate. Just before he was going to be lynched, an unknown woman in the crowd claimed he was innocent, after which the mob returned him to the jail.

In his memoirs, Cameron stated that Shipp and Smith had committed the murder, albeit the version of events were different from what the mob claimed. Cameron admitted to initially participating in the robbery under peer pressure, but said he got cold feet and ran away upon recognizing the man, who was a friend. Cameron said he then heard Shipp and Smith shoot and kill the man as he fled.

The local chapter of the NAACP had tried, unsuccessfully, to evacuate the suspects from town to avoid the mob violence. The NAACP and the state's attorney general pressed to indict leaders of the lynch mob. Eight people were indicted for the lynching. However, the case was dropped after two of the defendants were acquitted.

Cameron was convicted of being an accessory before the fact to manslaughter and served four years in prison. Afterwards, he pursued work and an education. After dedicating his life to civil rights activism, Cameron was pardoned by the state of Indiana in 1991.

== Incident ==
The three suspects had been arrested the night before, charged with robbing and murdering a white factory worker, 23-year-old Claude Deeter, and raping his fiancée, 18-year-old Mary Ball, who was with him at the time. Deeter had planned to present Ball with her engagement ring the next day and the two were planning to get married next month.

A large crowd broke into the jail with sledgehammers, pulled out the three suspects, beating them and hanging them. When Abram Smith tried to free himself from the noose as his body was hauled up, he was lowered and men broke his arms to prevent such efforts. Police officers in the crowd cooperated in the lynching. A third person, 16-year-old James Cameron, narrowly escaped death thanks to an unidentified woman who said that the youth had nothing to do with the rape or murder. A local studio photographer, Lawrence Beitler, took a photograph of the dead men hanging from a tree surrounded by the large lynch mob; the crowd was estimated at 5,000 and included women and children. He sold thousands of copies of the photograph in the next ten days. After the lynchings, Mary Ball's mother muttered that Shipp and Smith had gotten what they deserved. Her daughter said it changed nothing. She later said she wished that she 'could have pulled the rope and would do the same for the other one," referring to Cameron. However, as they made funeral arrangements for their son, Deeter's parents both condemned the lynching of his murderers. His father told reporters, "God should have been the judge," while his mother said, "The mob had no right to do it."

Flossie Bailey, a local NAACP official in Marion, and Attorney General James M. Ogden worked to gain indictments against leaders of the mob in the lynchings, but the Grant County grand jury refused to return an indictment. Attorney General Ogden then brought charges against four leaders of the mob, as well as bringing impeachment proceedings against the Grant County sheriff who had refused to intervene.

Eight people were arrested and charged for the lynching. They were 36-year-old Robert Beshire, Charles Lennon, Chester Pease, 18-year-old Philip Boyd, Arnold Waller, 19-year-old Everett Paul Clark, Asa Davis, and a man whose last name was Praim. Beshire was acquitted after 30 minutes of deliberation, while Lennon was acquitted after 18 hours. Afterwards, the cases against the remaining defendants were dropped. Robert Beshire died of tuberculosis on March 14, 1933, at the age of 38. Charles Lennon died on January 31, 1971, at the age of 70. Philip Boyd and Everett Clark were both drafted into the Army during World War II. Both men survived the war. Boyd died on October 10, 1983, at the age of 71, and Clark died on July 17, 1986, at the age of 73.

In 1931, Cameron was tried for being an accessory before the fact to the murder of Deeter. On the stand, Mary Ball said she had been raped, but that she could not identify Cameron as one of her attackers. He was convicted on a lesser count of being an accessory before the fact to manslaughter and sentenced to two to 21 years in prison. He served four years at the Indiana State Prison before being paroled in 1935. Afterwards, he moved to Detroit, where he worked and went to college. In the 1940s he returned to Indiana, working as a civil rights activist and heading a state agency for equal rights. In the 1950s he moved to Milwaukee, Wisconsin. There in 1988 he founded America's Black Holocaust Museum, for African-American history and documentation of lynchings of African Americans. Cameron, who said his confession that he had held Ball while Smith raped her had been beaten out of him, was pardoned by Indiana's Governor in 1991.

== Legacy ==
- In 1937 Abel Meeropol, a Jewish schoolteacher from New York City and later the adoptive father of the sons of Julius and Ethel Rosenberg, saw a copy of Beitler's 1930 photograph. Meeropol later said that the photograph "haunted [him] for days" and inspired his poem "Bitter Fruit". It was published in the New York Teacher in 1937 and later in the magazine New Masses, in both cases under the pseudonym Lewis Allan. Meeropol set his poem to music, renaming it "Strange Fruit". He performed it at a labor meeting in Madison Square Garden. In 1939 it was performed, recorded and popularized by American singer Billie Holiday. The song reached 16th place on the charts in July 1939, and has since been recorded by numerous artists, continuing into the 21st century.
- After years as a civil rights activist, in 1988 James Cameron founded and became director of America's Black Holocaust Museum in Milwaukee, Wisconsin, devoted to African-American history in the United States. He intended it as a place for education and reconciliation.
- In 2007, artist David Powers supervised the creation of a mural, titled American Nocturne, in a park in downtown Elgin, Illinois. The mural depicts the bottom half of the Beitler photograph, showing the crowd at the lynching but not the bodies of Shipp and Smith. The artwork was intended as a critique of racism in American society. After it had been displayed without controversy for nearly a decade, in 2016 dissension was generated after someone posted images of the mural and lynching photo together on social media, and its origin was seen. The mural was moved from the park to the Hemmens Cultural Center. After hearing public comment, the Elgin Cultural Arts Commission recommended to the city council that the mural be permanently removed from public display. In 2021 the mural was replaced by one inspired by images painted on boarded-up storefronts during protests following George Floyd's murder.
- Artist Kerry James Marshall's "Heirlooms and Accessories" (2002) recontextualizes the photograph of the lynching, isolating the faces of three women in the crowd in pendants or lockets. The women are accessories to the murder, and part of a legacy of violence passed from generation to generation like an heirloom.

== See also ==
- List of photographs considered the most important
