= Winfield T. Durbin =

American politician

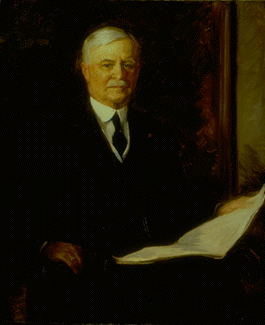

25th Governor of Indiana
- In office January 14, 1901 – January 9, 1905
- Lieutenant: Newton W. Gilbert
- Preceded by: James A. Mount
- Succeeded by: Frank Hanly

Personal details
- Born: May 4, 1847 Lawrenceburg, Indiana, U.S.
- Died: December 18, 1928 (aged 81) Anderson, Indiana, U.S.
- Resting place: Crown Hill Cemetery and Arboretum, Section 23, Lot 11; 39.8189029°N 86.1716489°W
- Party: Republican
- Spouse: Bertha McCullough

Military service
- Allegiance: United States
- Branch/service: United States Army
- Years of service: 1862–1864; 1898
- Rank: Colonel
- Unit: 139th Regiment Indiana Infantry
- Battles/wars: American Civil War; Spanish–American War

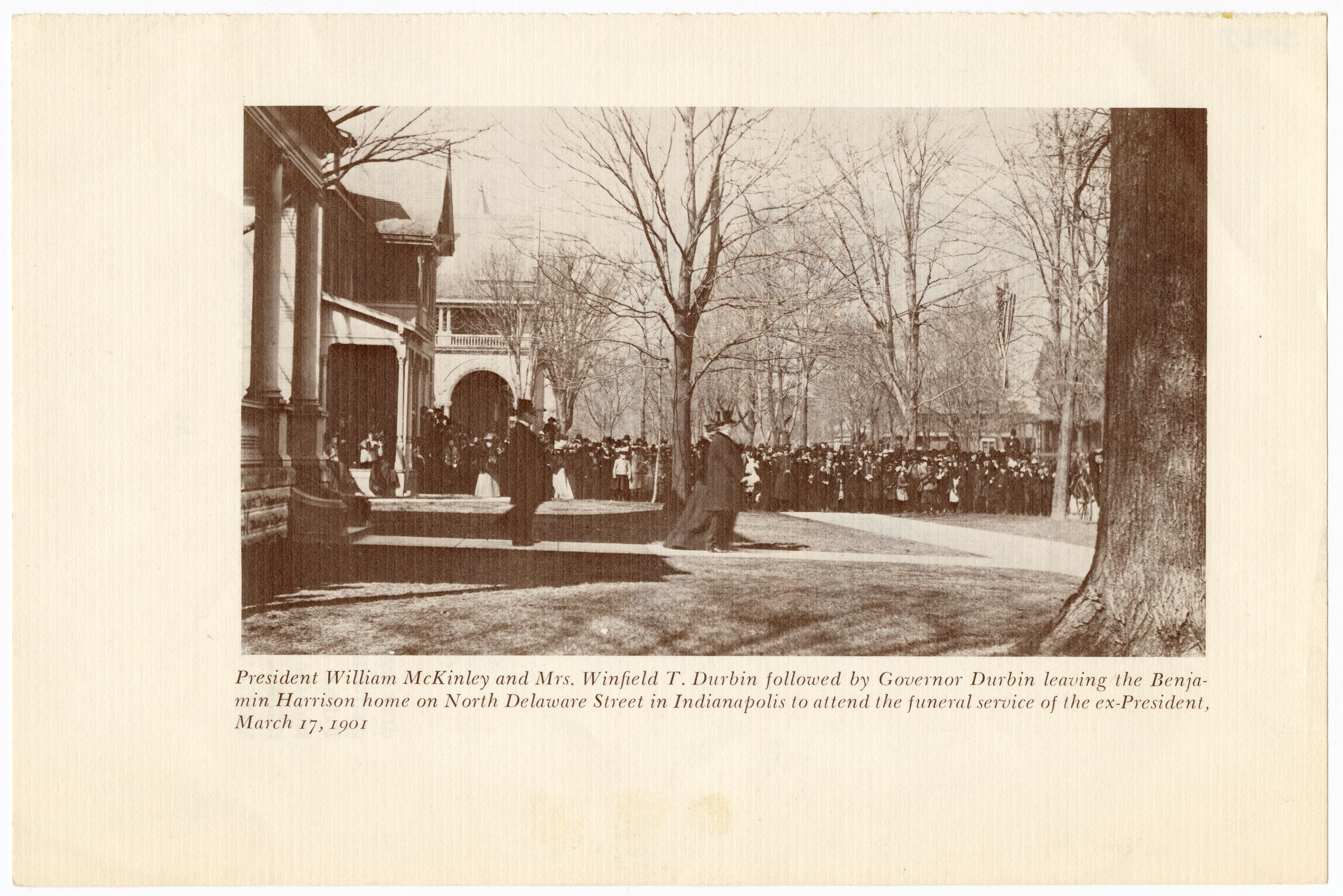
Durbin accompanying William McKinley to the funeral of Benjamin Harrison, 1901

Winfield Taylor Durbin (May 4, 1847 – December 18, 1928) was an American politician serving as the 25th governor of the U.S. state of Indiana from 1901 to 1905. His term focused on progressive legislation and suppression of white cap vigilante organizations operating in the southern part of the state. He was the seventh and last veteran of the American Civil War to serve as governor.

== Early life ==
Durbin was born in Lawrenceburg, Indiana, on May 4, 1847, the son of William S. and Eliza Ann Sparks, the youngest of seven sons. While still a young boy, his family moved to New Philadelphia, Indiana where he attended public school and worked in his father's tannery producing leather. At the outbreak of the American Civil War, he and his brothers enlisted in the Union army. His brothers were accepted, but he was turned away because of a recent arm injury. After it healed he attempted to enlist again, and helped raise a company of the 139th Regiment Indiana Infantry, serving from April 1864 until the conclusion of the war. He mustered in at Camp Morton and his regiment was first dispatched to the Siege of Vicksburg, (Durbin could not have been at the siege of Vicksburg. The Rebels surrendered Vicksburg July 4, 1863. Durbin did not begin serving until nearly a year after Vicksburg.) and was then in the expedition to Arkansas Post.

He left the army after the war and studied briefly in a St. Louis, Missouri college before moving to Indianapolis, Indiana where he worked in a dry-goods store as a bookkeeper. In 1879 he left Indianapolis and moved to Anderson where he met Bertha McCullough. The two were married on October 6, 1875, and had two children. During the Indiana Gas Boom, Durbin worked with his father-in-law to found a number of manufacturing businesses and became moderately wealthy.

Durbin became active in local politics and was elected as a member of the State Republican Central Committee and was appointed to the executive committee in charge of western headquarters. He played a prominent role nationally in the Grand Army of the Republic, and was involved in lobbying. At the outbreak of the Spanish–American War he enlisted in the army and promoted by Governor James A. Mount to colonel, and was given command of the 161st Regiment Indiana Infantry in July 1898. His regiment was deployed in the occupation of Havana, Cuba for three months after which he returned home.

Durbin was nominated to run for governor in 1900, and easily won the convention vote. Opinion was strongly against Democrats, and the leading members of the party refused to run for governor that year. The party fielded John Kern to oppose Durbin, but Durbin became the first governor to win by majority in twenty-five years. Durbin's primary goal as governor was to bring efficiency to the state, and reform the government to function more economically, and to enact progressive legislation.

Winfield T. Durbin was a Freemason, raised in Ancient Landmarks Lodge No. 319, Indianapolis (1871) and later affiliated with Mt. Moriah Lodge No. 77, Anderson (1885). He belonged to Anderson Chapter and Commandery; served as Grand Commander of Knights Templar in Indiana (1896); and was crowned a 33° Scottish Rite Mason in 1899.

== Governor ==
=== White caps ===
His predecessors policy toward white cap organizations had led to an increase of their activities. Although exact numbers are not known, at least sixty-eight lynching had occurred in recent years against suspected criminals, and numerous other types of vigilante justice was being dealt out by the groups. Most of their activity was in the southern part of the state. The General Assembly passed anti-lynching laws in 1899, requiring sheriff's to petition the governor for military assistance when lynchings were threatened and granted the governor power to remove sheriffs from office who refused to turn over prisoners to state custody, and to call out the militia to protect prisoners. Despite the law, lynchings continued until Durbin took office. In 1902 he invoked the law after a lynching, removing from office numerous law enforcement officials and putting the militia on patrol.

In 1903, a police officer was killed in Evansville, and the sheriff sent word to the governor, requesting assistance in protecting the suspect in custody. Durbin dispatched a company of militia to protect the jailhouse. A mob of the white caps soon surrounded the jailhouse and the militia and began taunting them for several hours. Someone in the crowd fired a shot at the soldiers, who responded by opening fire on the crowd, wounding eleven and killing one. The mob quickly fled. No more lynchings would occur in Indiana for more another thirty years until the deaths of Thomas Shipp and Abram Smith.

=== Progressive agenda ===
Indiana's industry had grown at a rapid pace over the past decade, and numerous labor unions had begun to form in the state. He advocated additional anti-trust protections for the public, enactment of fines for vote buyers, and the creation of juvenile courts. He conducted statewide audits, and discovered an embezzlement scheme at Indiana University by Monroe County officials. He threatened to move the college to another city if the board could not get the situation under control.

Automobile usage in Indiana went from almost non-existent to such a level that Durbin began to advocate the construction of superior state highways. He saw the advantages of Indiana's position in the nation, which required a large part of traffic from the west to pass through Indiana in order to reach the northeastern United States.

== Final years ==
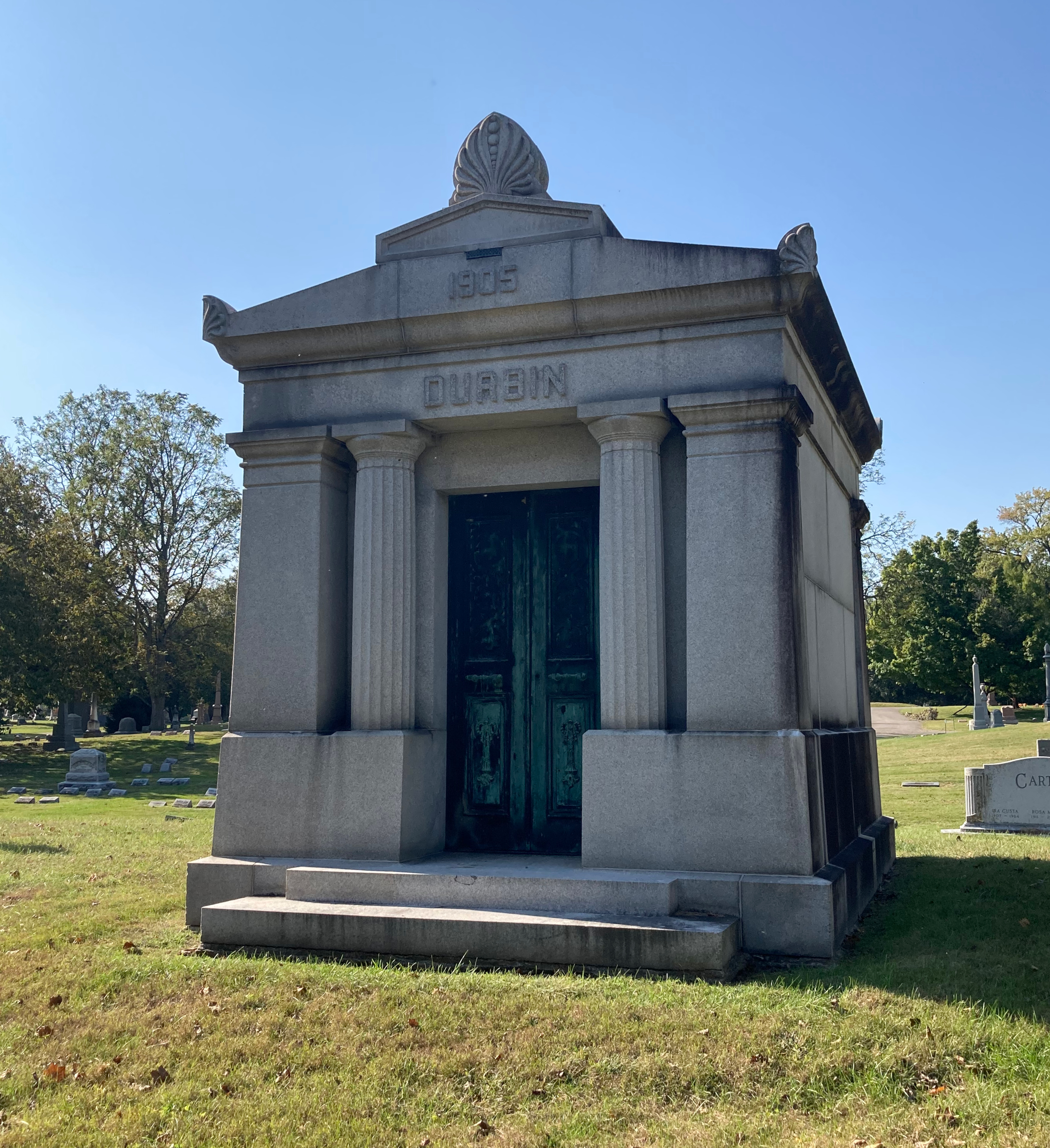
Durbin mausoleum at Crown Hill Cemetery

When Durbin left office he returned to Anderson to resume overseeing his business interest. He returned to the public again in 1911 when Democrats attempted to call a constitutional convention. Along with former Governor Frank Hanly, he traveled the state railing against the Democrats and their proposed constitution as socialist. He remained active in the party, and was nominated as the Republican candidate to for governor again in 1912. The Republican party had fractured over the constitutional issue, despite preventing the calling of a convention. Many members left to join the Progressive Party in the following year. Durbin came in third in the election and was defeated by Democrat Samuel M. Ralston, with the Progressive candidate Albert Beveridge coming in second.

Durbin returned again to Anderson where he remained the rest of his life. He died on December 18, 1928, of bronchial pneumonia following an attack of influenza. He is buried in Crown Hill Cemetery.

== Electoral history ==
Indiana gubernatorial election, 1900
Party	Candidate	Votes	%
Republican	Winfield T. Durbin	331,531	50.5
Democratic	John W. Kern	306,272	46.7
Prohibition	Charles N. Eckhart	13,453	2.1
Populist	A.G. Burkhart	1,504	0.2

== See also ==
- List of governors of Indiana

Party political offices
Preceded by James A. Mount	Republican nominee for Governor of Indiana; 1900	Succeeded by Frank Hanly
Preceded by James Eli Watson	Republican nominee for Governor of Indiana; 1912	Succeeded by James P. Goodrich
Political offices
Preceded by James A. Mount	Governor of Indiana; January 14, 1901 – January 9, 1905	Succeeded by Frank Hanly
