= 1849 Indiana gubernatorial election =

- August 6, 1849
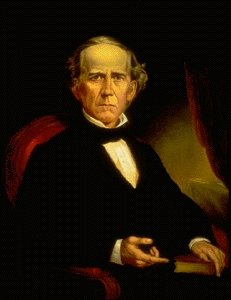

Nominee	Joseph A. Wright	John A. Matson
Party	Democratic	Whig
Popular vote	76,996	67,218
Percentage	52.27%	45.64%
- County results Wright: 40–50% 50–60% 60–70% 70–80% 80–90% Matson: 40–50% 50–60% No Vote/Data
Governor before election
James Whitcomb
Democratic
Elected Governor
Joseph A. Wright
Democratic

The 1849 Indiana gubernatorial election was held on August 6, 1849.

This was the last election held in August, and the last election for a three-year term, until a new state constitution came into effect in 1851.

Incumbent Democratic Governor James Whitcomb was term-limited, and could not seek a third consecutive term.

Democratic nominee Joseph A. Wright defeated Whig nominee John A. Matson and Free Soil nominee James H. Cravens with 52.27% of the vote.

Before the election, on December 26, 1848, Whitcomb resigned, having been elected to the United States Senate. Lieutenant Governor Paris C. Dunning acted as governor for the remainder of the unexpired term.

== General election ==
=== Candidates ===
- James H. Cravens, Free Soil, former U.S. Representative
- John A. Matson, Whig, attorney, former member of the Indiana House of Representatives, unsuccessful candidate for Indiana's 3rd congressional district in 1843
- Joseph A. Wright, Democrat, former U.S. Representative

=== Results ===
1849 Indiana gubernatorial election (Note: The Indiana State Senate Journal and some other sources give the result as Wright 76,996, Matson 67,228, Cravens 3,018.)
Party	Candidate	Votes	%	±%
Democratic	Joseph A. Wright	76,996	52.27%	
Whig	John A. Matson	67,218	45.64%	
Free Soil	James H. Cravens	3,076	2.09%	
Write-in	Ephraim Trabu	3	0.00	
Write-in	James A. Matson (Note: Likely intended for John A. Matson.)	2	0.00	
Majority		9,778	6.63%	
Turnout		147,295		
Democratic hold		Swing		
