= Steele Dunning Historic District =

Historic district in Indiana, United States

- U.S. National Register of Historic Places
- U.S. Historic district
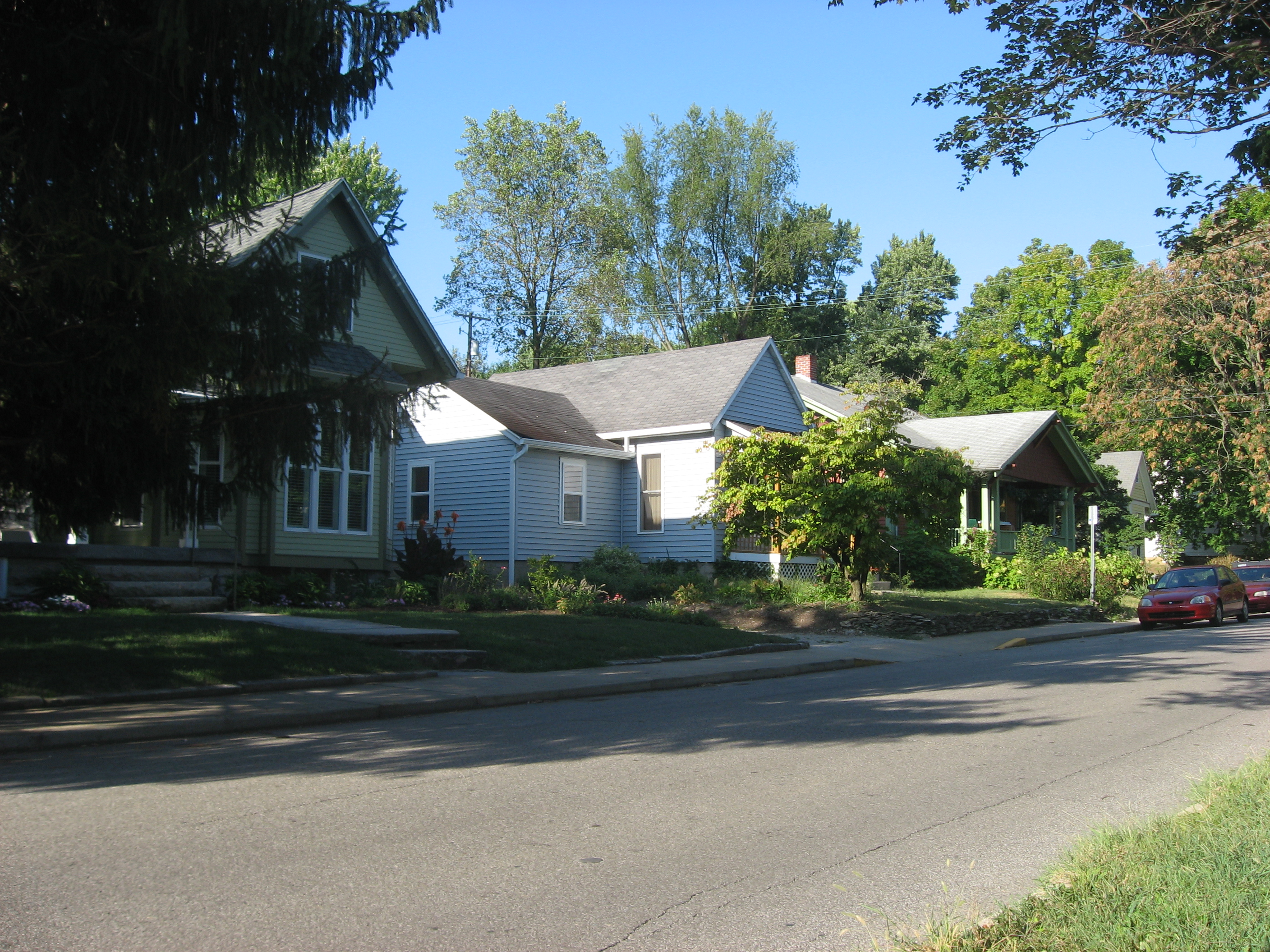
- Houses on Fourth Street in the district

- Location within Indiana Location within the United States
- Location: Roughly bounded by Maple St., Kirkwood Ave., Rogers St., and W. 3rd St., Bloomington, Indiana
- Coordinates: 39°9′54″N 86°32′24″W
- Area: 8.7 acres (3.5 ha)
- Architectural style: Queen Anne, Bungalow/American Craftsman
- NRHP reference No.: 00001140
- Added to NRHP: September 22, 2000

The Steele Dunning Historic District is a neighborhood and historic district in Bloomington, Indiana, United States. Composed of small, single- or double-family houses, the district includes houses built from the late nineteenth century through the middle of the twentieth century.

== Construction ==
Steele Dunning is located on Bloomington's west side, north of the older Prospect Hill neighborhood. In the earliest years of white settlement of Bloomington, the land presently occupied by the neighborhood was part of a farm once owned by Paris C. Dunning, once Governor of Indiana. Dunning's house, known as the Blair-Dunning House, sits immediately southeast of Steele Dunning; among its owners after Dunning was Henry Steele, who bought the land in 1931. At this time, Bloomington was prospering greatly, and Steele chose to subdivide 6 acres (2.4 ha) of his land to create a neighborhood. The resulting community is located primarily along the east-west Third and Fourth Streets and the north-south Fairview and Jackson Streets.

== Architecture ==
The neighborhood that resulted from Steele's subdivision consists almost entirely of single-story houses, most of which were built in a "Free Classic" style that resembles the Queen Anne style of architecture. Some of the houses in the neighborhood are older than the neighborhood itself, such as three different double-pen houses that were constructed during the nineteenth century. Two of the houses are duplexes; erected largely for speculative purposes, they were constructed in such a way that they resemble single-family houses. The form of architecture employed for these residences is known as the "T-plan" because of their floor plan that is shaped like that letter; they feature porches on both sides that are separated by a large gable with a pediment.

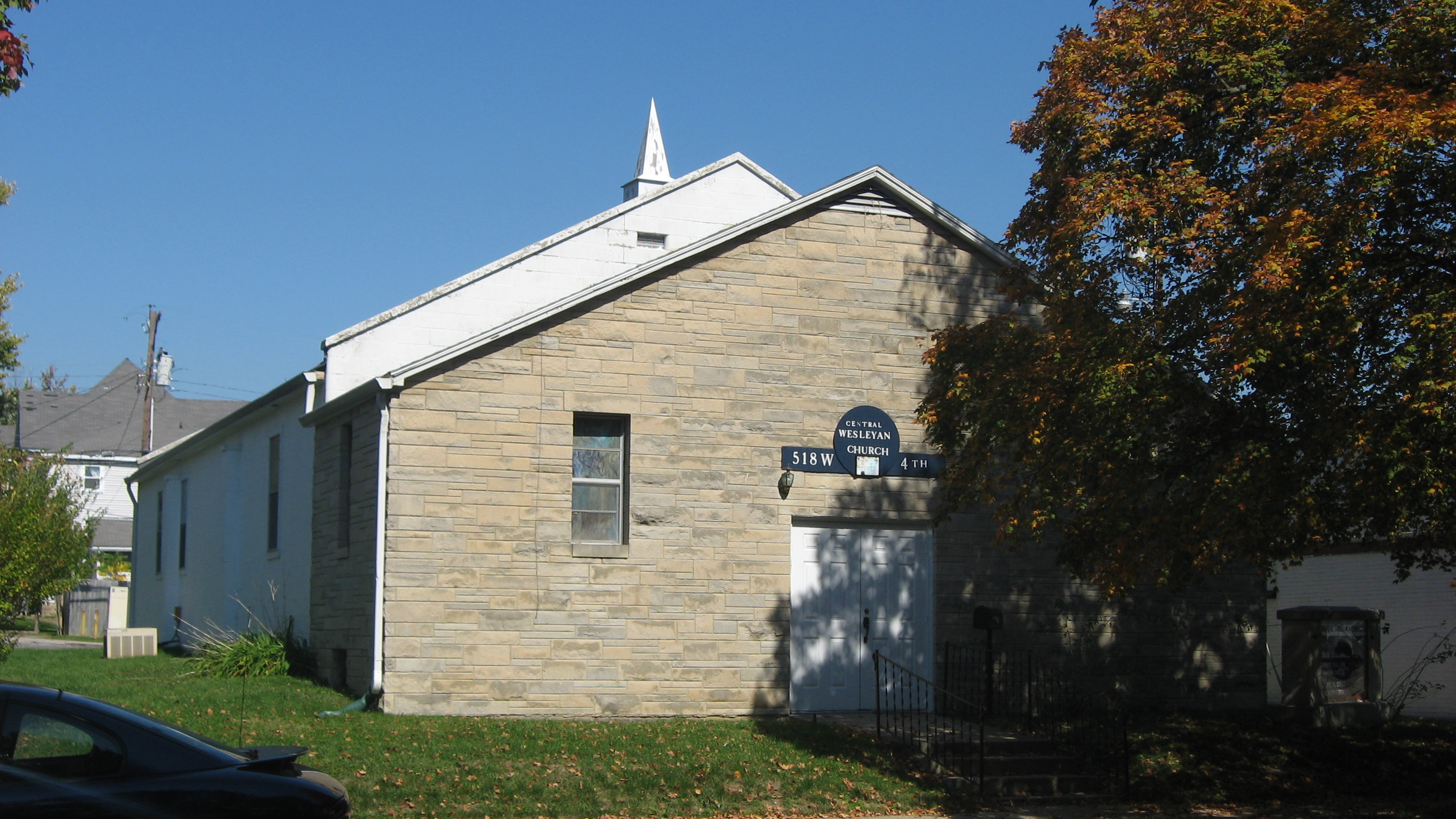
Central Wesleyan Church, one of the non-contributing buildings

Despite the small size of the neighborhood, its houses were built at different times; some were built in the late nineteenth century, including one from 1880, while others are as late as 1950. In addition, there are eight non-contributing buildings (seven houses and a church building); built at various dates as late as 1962, they are located within the boundaries of the historic district, but are not parts of it. The majority of the properties in the district were constructed in the early twentieth century; most houses on Fourth Street were constructed between 1900 and 1910, and the houses on Third Street were erected in the second quarter of the century. As a result of the different construction dates, the architectural styles of the two streets are different: Fourth Street primarily features the Free Classic style, while most Third Street residences are in the Arts and Crafts style. Among the most historically significant of the houses are the duplexes on Fourth Street (among the city's first duplexes), the house at 608 Fourth Street that was once home to Bloomington mayor John Hetherington, and the "saddlebag" house at 521 Fourth Street, which was built in 1898. Two Sears Modern Homes and one shotgun house are also found in the district.

== Historic assessment ==
Twenty-five buildings within the district's boundaries qualified as contributing properties — they help to make the district historic. Between 1999 and 2001, historic preservation officials working with the city of Bloomington surveyed the entire city and identified over two thousand buildings that were deemed to be historic to one extent or another, including the twenty-five in Steele Dunning. These buildings were divided into three classifications: Outstanding, Notable, and Contributing. Properties rated as "Outstanding" were deemed to be historically significant enough to deserve consideration for inclusion on the National Register of Historic Places by themselves; "Notable" properties were worthy of special consideration, although not likely to be worthy of individual National Register status; "Contributing" locations were seen as significant parts of their historic districts, but not of great significance by themselves. One of Steele Dunning's contributing properties (the "saddlebag" house) received an "Outstanding" rating, and nine were deemed "Notable;" only fifteen were called "Contributing." The district includes a disproportionately large number of above-average properties: about 13% of the city's sites were named either "Notable" or "Outstanding," in contrast to 40% of those in Steele Dunning. In late 2000, the entire district was listed on the National Register, qualifying both because of its place in the region's history and because of its historically significant architecture. Like the city-designated district, the federally designated district includes twenty-five buildings; however, it also includes two structures, which were not included in the city's designation.

=== Table of contributing buildings ===
Rating	Image	Address	Year	Style	Comments
Contributing		616 Third Street; 39°9′52″N 86°32′26″W	1935	Sears	Model name of "Berwyn"
Contributing		618 Third Street; 39°9′52″N 86°32′26.5″W	1948	Vernacular	
Notable		704 Third Street; 39°9′52″N 86°32′27.5″W	1928	American Craftsman/Bungalow	
Notable		706 Third Street; 39°9′52″N 86°32′28″W	1928	American Craftsman/Bungalow	
Contributing		710 Third Street; 39°9′52″N 86°32′29.2″W	1920	Vernacular	
Contributing		712 Third Street; 39°9′52″N 86°32′30″W	1916	Vernacular	
Contributing		517 Fourth Street; 39°9′56″N 86°32′21.8″W	1909	Vernacular	
Contributing		520 Fourth Street; 39°9′56.8″N 86°32′22.5″W	1915	Arts and Crafts/Bungalow	
Outstanding		521 Fourth Street; 39°9′56″N 86°32′23″W	1898	Vernacular	
Contributing		522 Fourth Street; 39°9′56.8″N 86°32′23″W	1920	Vernacular	
Contributing		600 Fourth Street; 39°9′56.8″N 86°32′24″W	1898	Free Classic	
Notable		601-603 Fourth Street; 39°9′56″N 86°32′24″W	1900	Free Classic	
Notable		605-607 Fourth Street; 39°9′56″N 86°32′25″W	1907	Free Classic	
Notable		608 Fourth Street; 39°9′56.8″N 86°32′25″W	1910	Vernacular	Home of John Hetherington
Contributing		612 Fourth Street; 39°9′56.8″N 86°32′25.8″W	1910	Vernacular	
Notable		613 Fourth Street; 39°9′56″N 86°32′26″W	1900	Free Classic	
Notable		620 Fourth Street; 39°9′56.8″N 86°32′26.7″W	1904	Free Classic	Restoration in 1998 sparked recognition of the neighborhood as a historic district
Notable		621 Fourth Street; 39°9′56″N 86°32′27″W	1900	Free Classic	
Contributing		701 Fourth Street; 39°9′56″N 86°32′28″W	1940	Bungalow	
Contributing		705 Fourth Street; 39°9′56″N 86°32′28.5″W	1920	Vernacular	
Contributing		713 Fourth Street; 39°9′56″N 86°32′29.2″W	1926	Shotgun	
Contributing		715 Fourth Street; 39°9′56″N 86°32′30″W	1925	American Craftsman/Bungalow	
Contributing		209 Fairview Street; 39°9′54.5″N 86°32′25.8″W	1930	Sears	Model name of "Selby"
Contributing		210 Jackson Street; 39°9′54.5″N 86°32′25″W	1950	Vernacular	
Notable		213 Jackson Street; 39°9′54.7″N 86°32′23″W	1880	Vernacular	
