= George Hedford Dunn =

American lawyer and politician (1794–1854)

George H. Dunn

4th Indiana State Treasurer
- In office 1841–1844
- Governor: Samuel Bigger; James Whitcomb
- Preceded by: Nathan B. Palmer
- Succeeded by: Royal Mayhew

Member of the U.S. House of Representatives from Indiana's 4th district
- In office March 4, 1837 – March 3, 1839
- Preceded by: Amos Lane
- Succeeded by: Thomas Smith

Member of the Indiana House of Representatives
- In office 1828–1829; 1832–1824

Personal details
- Born: George Hedford Dunn; November 15, 1794 New York City, US
- Died: January 12, 1854 (aged 59) Lawrenceburg, Indiana, US
- Resting place: Glendale Cemetery
- Party: Whig

George Hedford Dunn (November 15, 1794 – January 12, 1854) was an American lawyer, slaveholder, and politician. A Whig, he was a member of the United States House of Representatives from 1837 to 1839. He later served as the Indiana State Treasurer.

== Biography ==
Dunn was born on November 15, 1794, in New York City. In 1817, he moved to Lawrenceburg, Indiana, where he studied law. After being admitted to the bar in 1822, after which he commenced practice in Lawrenceburg.

He owned slaves.

=== Political career ===
Dunn was a Whig. He served in the Indiana House of Representatives in 1828 and 1829, and again from 1832 to 1834. As a representative, he promoted Indiana's first railroad. He was an unsuccessful candidate for the Indiana Senate in 1831. He unsuccessfully ran for the United States House of Representatives for the 24th Congress, though won the following Congressional election. He served in Congress from March 4, 1837, to March 3, 1839, representing Indiana's 4th district. He lost the following election. From 1841 to 1844, he was the Indiana State Treasurer, and from 1847 to 1850, was judge of Dearborn County.

Between serving in Congress and as Indiana State Treasurer, Dunn returned to practicing law.

=== Later career and death ===
Up until his death, he was president of the Cincinnati, Indianapolis and Western Railroad. He was also a trustee of Indiana University. He died on January 12, 1854, aged 59, in Lawrenceburg. He was buried at New Town Cemetery, later being moved to Glendale Cemetery. His tombstone features a model train on top of it. He was married, with him being buried beside his wife.

Political offices
Preceded by Nathan B. Palmer	Treasurer of Indiana; 1841–1844	Succeeded by Royal Mayhew
U.S. House of Representatives
Preceded by Amos Lane	Member of the U.S. House of Representatives from Indiana's 4th congressional district 1837-1839	Succeeded by Thomas Smith
