= Joseph A. Wright =

American politician (1810–1867)

Joseph Albert Wright
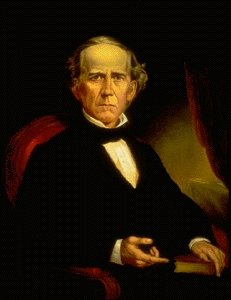

United States Senator from Indiana
- In office February 24, 1862 – January 14, 1863
- Appointed by: Oliver P. Morton
- Preceded by: Jesse D. Bright
- Succeeded by: David Turpie

United States Envoy Extraordinary and Minister Plenipotentiary to Prussia
- In office September 3, 1865 – May 11, 1867
- President: Andrew Johnson
- Preceded by: Norman B. Judd
- Succeeded by: George Bancroft
- In office September 3, 1857 – July 1, 1861
- President: James Buchanan
- Preceded by: Peter Dumont Vroom
- Succeeded by: Norman B. Judd

10th Governor of Indiana
- In office December 5, 1849 – January 12, 1857
- Lieutenant: Jim Lane; Ashbel P. Willard
- Preceded by: Paris C. Dunning
- Succeeded by: Ashbel P. Willard

Member of the U.S. House of Representatives from Indiana's 7th district
- In office March 4, 1843 – March 3, 1845
- Preceded by: Henry S. Lane
- Succeeded by: Edward W. McGaughey

Member of the Indiana House of Representatives
- In office 1832-1838

Personal details
- Born: Joseph Albert Wright; April 17, 1810 Washington, Pennsylvania, US
- Died: May 11, 1867 (aged 57) Berlin, Prussia
- Party: Democratic
- Spouses: Louisa Cook (m. 1831; died 1852) Harriet Burbridge (m. 1854; died 1855) Caroline Rockwell (m. 1863)
- Children: 4
- Education: Indiana University Bloomington

Joseph Albert Wright (April 17, 1810 – May 11, 1867) was the tenth governor of the U.S. state of Indiana from December 5, 1849, to January 12, 1857, most noted for his opposition to banking. His positions created a rift between him and the Indiana General Assembly who overrode all of his anti-banking vetoes. He responded by launching legal challenges to the acts, but was ruled against by the Indiana Supreme Court. The state's second constitutional convention was held during 1850–1851 in which the current Constitution of Indiana was drafted. He was a supporter of the new constitution and gave speeches around the state urging its adoption. He was opposed throughout his term by Senator Jesse D. Bright, the leader of the state Democratic Party.

After his term as governor, he was appointed to serve as United States Envoy Extraordinary and Minister Plenipotentiary to Prussia where he served until the outbreak of the American Civil War. Although he was a Democrat, he was openly pro-Union during the war, and was elected to serve as a United States senator, filling the term of Copperhead Jesse D. Bright, who was expelled from the Senate for disloyalty. Following the war he was reappointed to his ambassadorial post where he remained until his death in Berlin, Prussia.

== Early life ==
=== Family and education ===
Joseph Albert Wright was born in Washington, Pennsylvania, on April 17, 1810, the son of John and Rachel Seaman Wright. He moved with his family to Bloomington, Indiana, in 1820, where he attended public school. His father was a bricklayer, and worked as one of the laborers who built the first halls of Indiana State Seminary (now Indiana University). He was the brother of future Iowa Senator George G. Wright. His father died when he was fourteen, and his family become impoverished. Wright worked as a janitor, bell ringer, and occasional bricklayer, in order to pay for his schooling and provide income for his family.

Living in Bloomington, he was able to attend the seminary while living at home, making the education affordable for him. Many of his classmates were from wealthier families, and he earned money by selling them nuts and fruits he picked in the forest around his home. Wright received a classical education, learning Greek and Latin. He graduated in 1828 and decided to become a lawyer. He studied law in the office of Craven Hester, one of southern Indiana's leading judges and political figures, and was admitted to the bar in 1829. He then moved to Rockville where he opened a law practice where he met Louisa Cook, the daughter of a wealthy local farmer. She was an ardent Methodist who converted Wright before the couple married on November 30, 1831. The couple had a son, but Louisa's poor health and several bouts with malaria prevented her from having more children, leading them to adopt a daughter in 1832. Wright became very active in the Methodist Church and an outspoken advocate of Sunday School and religious study in public schools. Much of his early support came from the church and many of his campaign rallies were held in Methodist churches.

=== State legislator ===
Through his law office, Wright became a friend of state representative William Perkins Bryant. In 1832, Bryant moved to Kentucky, leaving his seat vacant, and urged Wright to take it. With his support, Wright was elected and served as Parke County's representative to the Indiana House of Representatives, serving a one-year term. During the term he supported the charter for the Bank of Indiana, an unpopular act in his district, and he was defeated in his reelection bid. In 1836, supporting internal improvements, he ran again and was elected to serve a second term; it was during the height of the state's internal improvement craze and he voted for the implementing act.

He left the General Assembly to become the prosecuting attorney of the Indiana 1st circuit in 1838, but found he did not like the constant traveling and resigned the following year. He ran for the Indiana State Senate in 1839. The campaign was hard-fought, occurring in the same year that the Indiana Territory's popular former governor, William Henry Harrison, became President of the United States. Wright ran against Whig candidate Edward W. McGaughty, in a "bitter and strenuous" campaign. In one of his opponents tracts, Wright was referred to as the "Infidel Dog who dares to open his God-deyfing lips" against Harrison. Wright narrowly won the election by 171 votes. The election caused a great deal of personal animosity between Wright and the Whig party.

=== Congressman ===
After the 1840 legislative session, Wright reopened his law office with a new partner, congressman Tilghman A. Howard, a friend of the governor and President Andrew Jackson. At Tilghman's suggestion he ran for Congress in 1843 in his Whig dominated district and won election narrowly, by only three votes. In Congress he opposed the expansion of slavery, but opposed abolition in favor of colonization and gradual emancipation. He was defeated in his 1845 reelection campaign by 171 votes. He ran again in 1847, but was again defeated in a close election. His popularity in a Whig district further helped his standing in the party. He had been a supporter of the independence of the Republic of Texas while in Congress and was appointed by President James Polk to serve as the United States Commissioner to Texas in 1845, a diplomatic post he held throughout the Mexican–American War until the annexation of Texas.

In 1849, Wright backed Whitcomb in his failed bid for the United States Senate against pro-slavery state Democratic leader Jesse D. Bright. Wright considered Bright to be his greatest foe, and on every occasion possible attempted to thwart his political success. For his loyalty, Whitcomb guaranteed Wright's nomination for governor in the state's 1849 Democratic Convention where Whitcomb presided. The state party had a major divide on the slavery issue and the internal improvement projects. Whitcomb tried to accommodate both side by taking the anti-slavery position and the anti-internal-improvement position.

== Governor ==
=== First term ===
The Whigs fielded John Matson to run against Wright in the 1849 gubernatorial election. The campaign focused almost exclusively on the issue of slavery and on which party was best positioned to prevent the extension of slavery into Indiana and the western territories, and which party was to blame for the state's bankruptcy which had finally been resolved in 1847. Wright had the most public record of opposing slavery as a congressman, and that seemed to help him in his decisive win at the polls. He was elected governor, winning by 9,778 votes, and took office on December 5, 1849. During the same election, the electorate also approved a constitutional convention to replace the Constitution of Indiana.

As governor, Wright nevertheless signed the arrest warrant for Methodist minister for Calvin Fairbank, who helped slaves escape from Kentucky on the Underground Railroad. As a result of Wright's signature, Fairbank was kidnapped by Kentuckians in Jeffersonville, Indiana, in 1851, dragged to Kentucky for trial, and sentenced to fifteen years' imprisonment under the Fugitive Slave Act of 1850. Fairbank reportedly received over 30,000 lashes in jail until he was pardoned in 1864.

His wife died on May 21, 1852, from malaria. Wright remarried to Harriet Burbridge on August 15, 1854, and the couple had twins, a son, Joseph Albert Jr. (1855–1932) and a daughter, Harriet (1855–1923). His second wife died in October 1855 shortly after giving birth.

During his administration Indiana adopted its current constitution, and Wright was a driving force in its adoption in 1851 election. Wright was a delegate at the convention where he championed the cause of tax reform, primarily by defining what could and could not be taxed by the state property tax and the creation of a bureau to manage the state's penal and benevolence institutions. The constitution also authorized a major reorganization of the state school system, which was enacted in 1852 with Wright overseeing many parts of the reform. He personally oversaw the creation of school boards across the state and placed tax collectors to begin collecting the revenues for the boards. He also oversaw the creation of the State Board of Education and the State Agricultural Board. Wright was an avid supporter of agriculture and created the State Board of Agriculture to help encourage and assist farm growth in Indiana. Among its early achievements, the first Indiana State Fair was organized in 1851.

Wright became an outspoken "anti-banker" primarily because of the popularity of the position, and unlike most of his party which supported the creation of private banks and ending the monopoly of the state bank, he was opposed to banks in any form. The charter for the Bank of Indiana was set to expire in 1857, and Wright not only opposed an extension of the bank's charter, but the enactment of laws to legalize any new banks from operating in the state. In 1851, Wright vetoed the state's Free Banking Act, which revoked the Bank of Indiana's monopoly within the state and allowed new banks to open in Indiana. The bill was returned to the General Assembly who passed it and overrode his veto.

His primary opponent during his term remained Jesse D. Bright, who led his faction of the party against Wright on many different measures. Bright continued to antagonize Wright, and at the party's 1852 convention Bright was able to keep a large number of delegates from casting a vote in an attempt to bog down proceedings and keep Wright from being nominated to run again for Governor. Despite the attempt, Wright did win.

=== Second term ===
He ran for governor again in 1852 under the new constitution—with an extended four-year gubernatorial term—against Whig Nicholas McCarty, and Free-Soiler Andrew L. Robinson. Wright won again with 95,576 votes to McCarty's 73,641, and Robinson's 3,308. There was a brief contention about the legality of his second term. The new state constitution banned governors from serving consecutive terms, but it was decided that because his original term occurred under the old constitution, he was still eligible to serve.

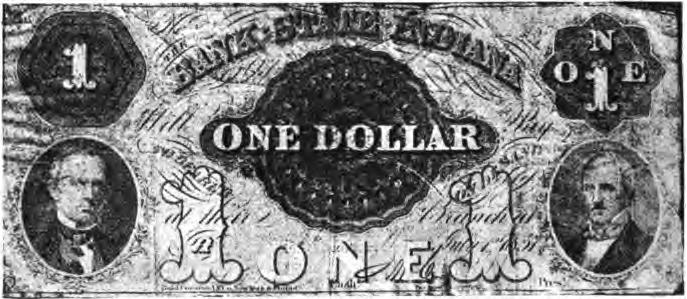
A one dollar bank note from the Bank of Indiana.

In 1855, another bill was passed to permit the Bank of Indiana to incorporate privately, and was also vetoed by Wright. The General Assembly again overrode his veto with a super-majority. Before the passage of law that permitted the bank to reincorporate, Wright personally delivered a speech to the House of Representatives in which he harangued the bank and accused them of "corruption and fraud", and alluded that the bank had bribed members of the General Assembly to pass the bill.

Wrights speech put him at odds with the Democrat-controlled legislature and severely hurt his relationship with them, including the lieutenant governor, who was a major supporter of the bill. Unhappy with the outcome of the situation, Wright decided to continue in his attempt to prevent the new bank from operating and launched lawsuits against the bill and the bank in the state courts. He demanded that the courts declare the law "null and void", but the circuit courts ruled against him. He appealed to the Indiana Supreme Court, who ultimately ruled in favor of the bank. With his legal options exhausted, Wright took the fight back to the legislature in 1857, giving a scathing speech accusing the body of many different violations of public good-will. He went on to say that "the means and applications brought to bear to secure passage of charter, would if exposed, exhibit the nakedest exposition of fraud and corruption that ever disgraced the Legislature of this state". The Senate responded by creating a commission to look into the accusations made by the Governor. Although only a few minor infractions were found, the committee agreed that the circumstances surrounding the passage of the bill were questionable and recommended the bank's charter be revoked, but no action was taken.

In 1854, the first cracks in the state Democratic Party began to show after the passage of the Kansas–Nebraska Act by Congress. Bright and his faction, a majority of the party, began forcing out anti-slavery members of the party leadership, using support of the act as a litmus test of party loyalty. By then the national debate over the possible break-up of the Union had begun. The Whig party was also on the brink of collapse, and a new coalition party of former Whigs, former Democrats, and the anti-slavery Free Soil and Liberty parties came together. The result was the so-called Know-Nothing Party and the first real challenge to Democratic control of the state in a generation. The 1854 mid-term election caused the Democrats to lose seats in the Senate, but still maintain control. The Democrats did, however, lose their majority in the house. The House was split with no party attaining majority, and the Whigs caucused with the Democrats to control the assembly. The effect was a virtual paralysis to the legislature, and Wright was unable to make any significant accomplishments during his last two years in office.

The Washington Monument was under construction during Wright's term. A strong supporter of the Union, Wright had a block sent for the monument with the inscription, "Indiana knows no East, no West, no North, no South; nothing but Union". The stone eventually found its way into the monument where it remains today. Wright left office popular with the public, but at odds with the leadership of his party. His position on banking had cost him much of their support, and he was especially denounced by Jesse D. Bright for his support of the Union over states-rights.

== Later life ==
=== American Civil War ===
In an attempt to maintain party unity, Wright declined an offer to run against Bright for his seat in the Senate, and instead supported Bright in his reelection. In exchange, Bright offered to secure Wright a cabinet post with James Buchanan. The offer was false, and Bright instead sought to have Wright removed to a post as far from Indiana as possible. Wright accepted appointment by President Buchanan to serve as Envoy Extraordinary and Minister Plenipotentiary to Prussia from 1857 until 1861. While he was away, Bright had Wright and many others officially thrown out of the party. Wright was in Germany when the American Civil War began, and he quickly returned home, arriving in Indianapolis on September 7, 1861, and openly supported the Union cause.

In 1861, a letter was intercepted addressed to "His Excellency, the President of the Confederate States of America", and was from Senator Bright, offering advice on procuring weapons. The Senate moved swiftly to expel Bright, and exiled him from the country on charges of disloyalty. Governor Oliver P. Morton seized Bright's Indiana estate for use a military post, and Bright was left ruined and impoverished. Wright was appointed to serve as senator in his place from February 24, 1862, until his replacement was elected and took the seat on January 14, 1863.

=== Death ===
He remarried again in 1863 to Caroline Rockwell who returned with him to Germany after Abraham Lincoln reappointed Wright to serve as the Ambassador to Prussia. Wright returned to Berlin in 1863 and remained there until his death on May 11, 1867. His body was returned to the United States and he was buried in New York City. The Wright Quadrangle student housing dorm at Indiana University was named after Wright.

== Electoral history ==
1849 Indiana gubernatorial election
Party	Candidate	Votes	%
Democratic	Joseph A. Wright	76,996	52.3
Whig	John A. Matson	67,218	45.6
Free Soil	James H. Cravens	3,076	2.1

1852 Indiana gubernatorial election
Party	Candidate	Votes	%
Democratic	Joseph A. Wright (incumbent)	95,576	55.4
Whig	Nicholas McCarty	73,641	42.7
Free Soil	James H. Cravens	3,308	1.9

== See also ==
- List of governors of Indiana

Party political offices
Preceded by James Whitcomb	Democratic nominee for Governor of Indiana; 1849, 1852	Succeeded by Ashbel P. Willard
U.S. House of Representatives
Preceded by Henry S. Lane	Member of the U.S. House of Representatives from Indiana's 7th congressional district 1843–1845	Succeeded by Edward W. McGaughey
Political offices
Preceded by Paris C. Dunning	Governor of Indiana; December 5, 1849 – January 12, 1857	Succeeded by Ashbel P. Willard
U.S. Senate
Preceded by Jesse D. Bright	U.S. senator (Class 1) from Indiana; 1862–1863; Served alongside: Henry S. Lane	Succeeded by David Turpie
Diplomatic posts
Preceded by Peter D. Vroom	United States Envoy to Prussia; September 3, 1857 – July 1, 1861	Succeeded by Norman B. Judd
Preceded by Norman B. Judd	United States Envoy to Prussia; September 3, 1865 – May 11, 1867	Succeeded by George Bancroft
