= Blair–Dunning House =

Historic house in Indiana, United States

- U.S. National Register of Historic Places
- U.S. Historic district – Contributing property
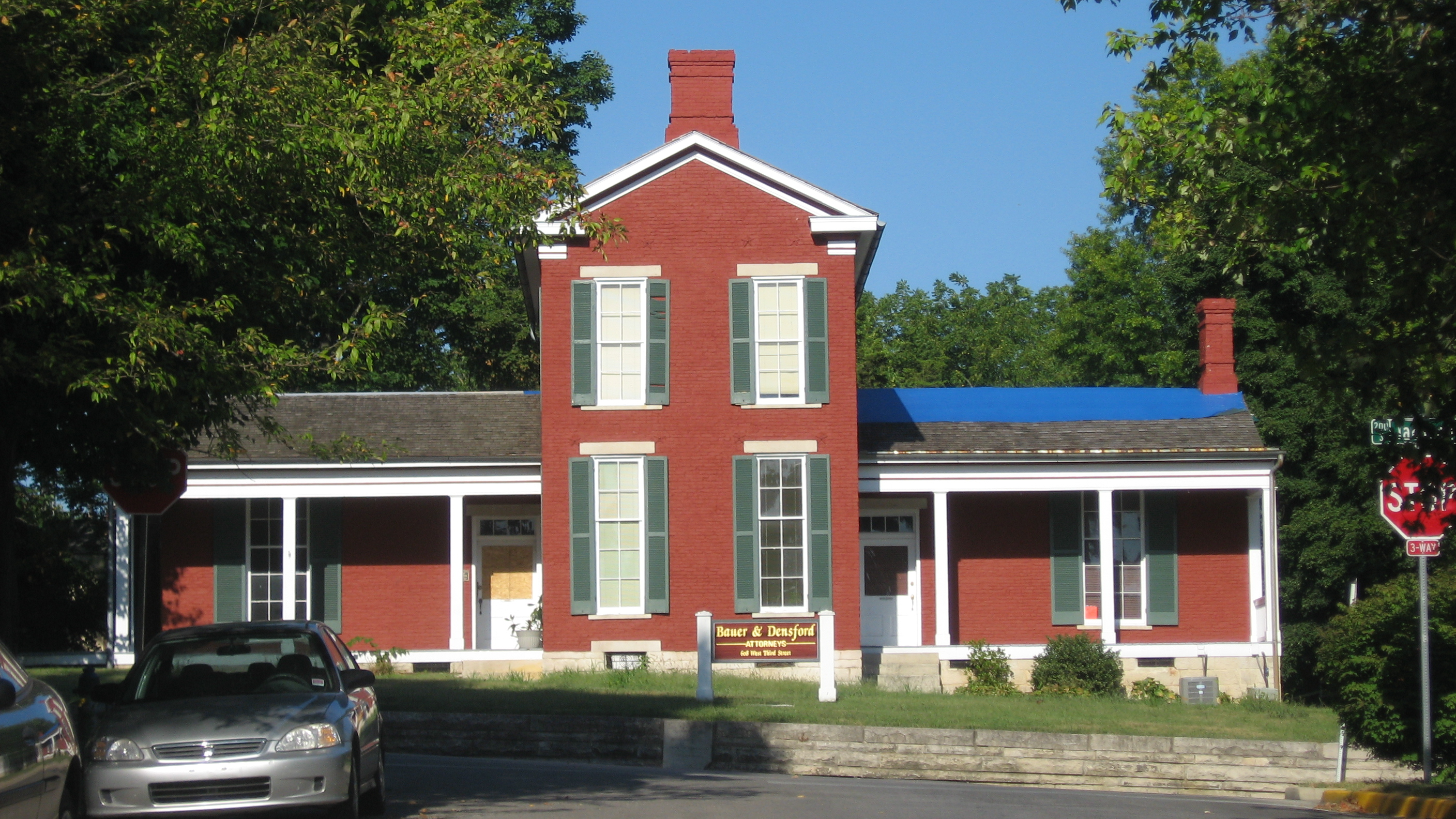
- Front of the Blair–Dunning House

- Location within Indiana Location within the United States
- Location: 608 W. 3rd St., Bloomington, Indiana
- Coordinates: 39°9′52″N 86°32′24″W
- Area: Less than 1 acre (0.40 ha)
- Built: 1822
- Architect: Enos Blair
- Architectural style: Greek Revival, Federal
- Part of: Prospect Hill Historic District (ID91000272)
- NRHP reference No.: 83000009
- Added to NRHP: February 10, 1983

The Blair–Dunning House is a historic house on the west side of Bloomington, Indiana, United States. Built in the 1820s as a farmhouse, it now lies at the heart of one of the city's neighborhoods, and it is one of Bloomington's most prominent houses. Once the home of the Governor of Indiana, it has been designated a historic site.

== Early history ==
The first settler on the grounds of the present house was Robertson Graham, who began farming there in 1817. He inhabited the land for a short time, selling it to the town of Bloomington in 1819. Construction of the Blair–Dunning House was a gradual process that lasted from 1822 to 1845, costing approximately $1,200. Its builder and first resident, Enos Blair, was one of Monroe County's most prominent citizens: among the area's first settlers, he served as the first jailer for the city of Bloomington and later held the offices of sheriff and Justice of the peace. Blair died in 1845; over the next twenty years, the house passed through many hands, including those of state representatives Elias Abel and Ransom Akin.

== Architecture ==
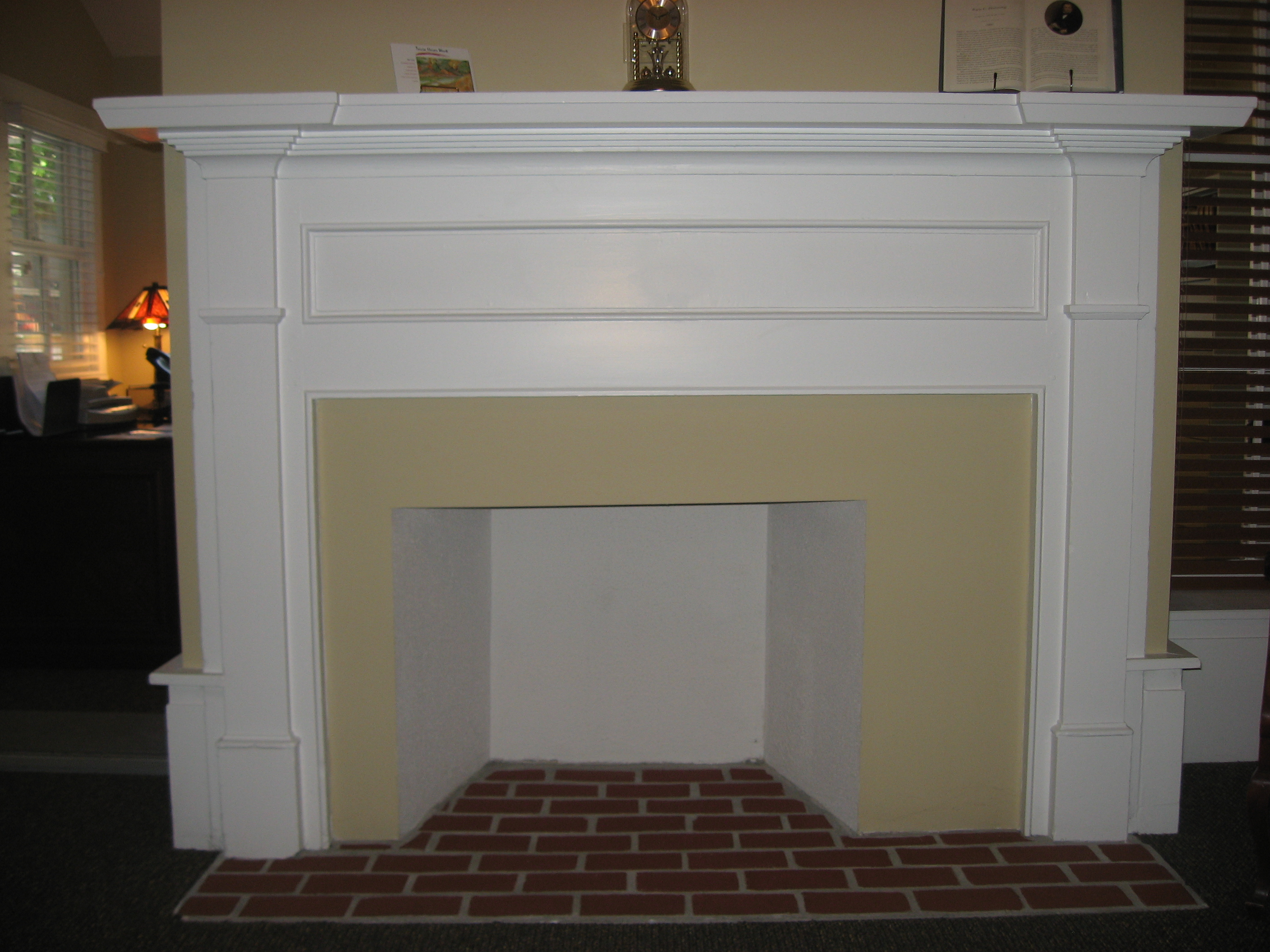
A fireplace inside the house

The original part of the Blair–Dunning House is a rectangular brick structure with a stone foundation, two stories tall and covered with a gabled roof. It is a linear quadruple-pen structure, measuring far longer east–west than north–south. Because the house occupies a hilly lot, the foundation under the front of the house is visible above the surface of the ground. Prominent elements of the exterior include large rectangular double-hung windows with limestone sills and lintels, a frieze with cornice, and corbelled chimneys on the eastern and western ends. The various elements of the house's design combine to form a structure that mixes the Greek Revival and Federal styles of architecture.

When the house was built, its front door faced north; this situation changed in the late 1860s, when wings were added both to the northern side and to the southern side of the original portion. As a result, the size of the house nearly doubled, and its main entrance was moved to the eastern end of the original house. Both additions are single-story structures with an individual room that measures 26 by 18 feet (7.9 by 5.5 m). Architecturally, they closely resemble the original portion of the house, with brick walls, corbelling, gabled roofs, stone window sills and lintels, and end chimneys.

Inside, the Blair–Dunning House is primarily a wooden building; yellow poplar wood is used throughout the building. Among the distinctive elements of the six-room interior are baseboards 18 inches (460 mm) tall, fireplaces in every room with massive mantels, and ceilings 11 feet (3.4 m) high, and a basement.

== After Blair ==
Paris C. Dunning bought the former Blair House in 1864. By this time, Dunning had established a reputation as a leading Indiana politician: he had served in the state legislature, been elected to the position of Lieutenant Governor, and served as Governor from 1838 to 1850. He only lived on the property for five years before selling it to grocer Jacob Young in 1869, who in turn sold it to businessman Matthew Dillon two years later; Dillon's family owned the farm for the rest of the century and into the 1930s.

Although the Blair–Dunning House was constructed in the middle of open countryside, the city of Bloomington has grown to surround it; the house now occupies a double lot within the city, and the only original structures remaining around the house are a pump and two cisterns. This growth was largely the result of expansion in the 1930s — the Dillon family sold their farm in 1931 to Henry Steele, who subdivided the property into a neighborhood; this neighborhood was designated the Steele Dunning Historic District in 2000. Today, the house occupies a hill at the end of Third Street, one of the city's most significant thoroughfares; as a result, it is visible from a great distance.

== Restoration ==
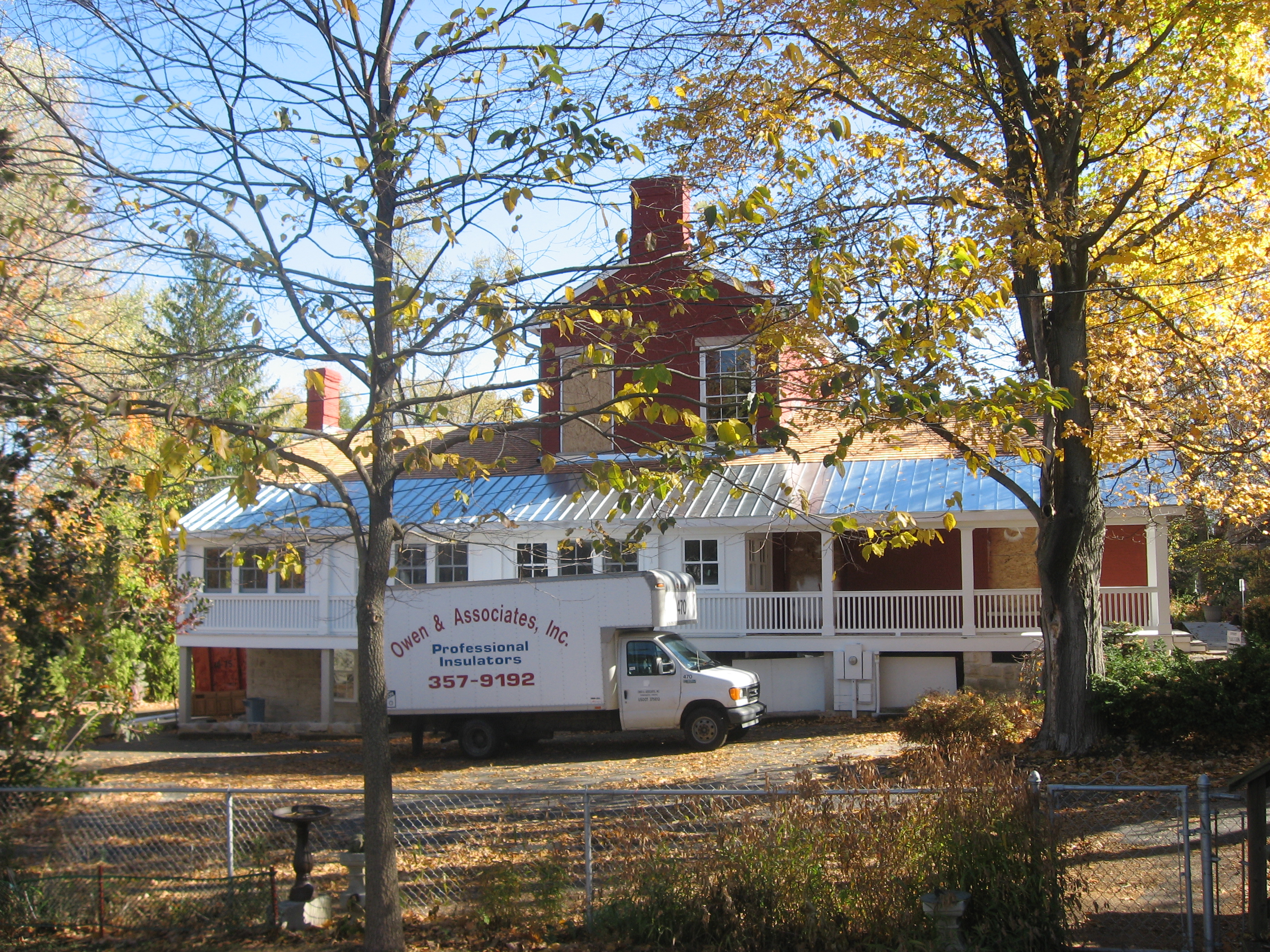
Rear during restoration after the fire

In the mid-1980s, a community foundation known as Bloomington Restorations led the restoration of the Blair–Dunning House. Problems such as water damage had destabilized the house's structure, almost causing the roof to collapse, while some of the bricks used in the walls had crumbled and weakened these walls significantly. As a result, one of the wings had to be removed, although the bricks were preserved and used to rebuild the wing. The exterior walls had changed significantly: they were originally painted red, but by the 1980s, they had been changed to grey, and for a time in the 20th century, the bricks were covered with stucco in order to protect them from the elements. Before the process began, it was estimated that the restoration of the exterior alone would cost nearly $50,000. Owner Lingle Craig enabled the restoration effort by donating the property to Bloomington Restorations in 1984; restoration or destruction of the house had been proposed for several years, but never accomplished. The foundation ultimately needed a loan of $90,000 to accomplish the restoration; besides the restoration and repainting of the wall bricks and the rebuilding of the wing, this renovation accomplished the rebuilding of a large rear porch and the reinforcement of the house's walls with steel rods.

At the end of 1985, the house was sold to a group of investors from Miami, Florida, who bought it with plans to rent it as commercial offices or as room for businesses in the arts and crafts fields. Today, the house is occupied by the law firm of Bauer and Densford. In 2010, the house was badly damaged by a short but fierce fire. Shortly after midnight on July 10, flames erupted in many portions of the house; sprinklers reduced the fire's impact, and a rapid response by the city fire department stopped the burning. Many Bloomington residents, recognizing the house's place in the community, offered aid to the owners in restoring the building, and the law firm promised that the damage would be completely repaired.

== Recognition ==
Local historians have pronounced the Blair–Dunning House the most important house in the city of Bloomington, except perhaps for buildings on the Indiana University campus. In recognition of its status, the house was designated a historic site by the city of Bloomington on July 5, 1979. This designation, which was granted in response to a request from the owners, prohibited significant modifications without permission from the city planning commission. At that time, the city was considering extending Third Street through the western side of the city; this designation prevented such an extension. As a result, the designation was controversial; some officials mildly opposed this designation, and others saw this opposition as a rejection of the very idea of historic preservation. Four years later, it was listed on the National Register of Historic Places, due primarily to its status as the home of Paris Dunning, the only Indiana politician to have held every elected executive and legislative office in state government. Today, the Blair–Dunning House is seen as the most important part of the Prospect Hill Historic District; added to the National Register in 1991, Prospect Hill encompasses one of Bloomington's oldest neighborhoods.
