= McMullan–Skinner House =

- U.S. National Register of Historic Places
- The house in November 1985
- Interactive map of McMullan–Skinner House
- Location: 308 South St., Greenville, Alabama
- Built: circa 1890
- Architectural style: Vernacular
- MPS: Greenville MRA
- NRHP reference No.: 86001865
- Added to NRHP: September 4, 1986

The McMullan–Skinner House was a historic residence in Greenville, Alabama, United States. The house was built around 1890 and shared a corner lot with the House at 308 South Street. It was a gable-roofed one-and-a-half story house with an inset front porch. The interior had a double-pen plan, with the originally detached kitchen connected to the house through an enclosed porch. The house was listed on the National Register of Historic Places in 1986, and demolished sometime before 2008.
