= Samuel Bigger =

American politician

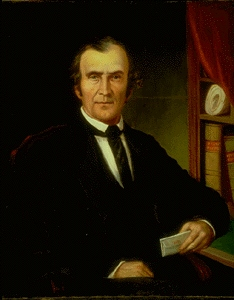

Indiana House of Representatives
- In office December 5, 1834 – December 4, 1835

Indiana Circuit Court Judge
- In office 1835–1840

7th Governor of Indiana
- In office December 9, 1840 – December 6, 1843
- Lieutenant: Samuel Hall
- Preceded by: David Wallace
- Succeeded by: James Whitcomb

Personal details
- Born: March 20, 1802 Franklin, Ohio, US
- Died: September 9, 1846 (aged 44) Fort Wayne, Indiana, US
- Party: Whig
- Spouse: Ellen Williamson

Samuel Bigger (March 20, 1802 – September 9, 1846) was the seventh governor of the U.S. state of Indiana from December 9, 1840, to December 6, 1843. Bigger was nominated to run for governor because he had no connection to the failed public works program. The state had entered a severe financial crisis in his predecessor's term and the government became insolvent during his first year in office. He oversaw the state's bankruptcy negotiations, but the bankruptcy he negotiated was only able to return the state to solvency briefly. By the time of his reelection campaign, the Whig Party had become the target of public blame for the debacle, and Bigger was defeated.

== Early life ==
=== Family and background ===
Samuel Bigger was born in Franklin, Ohio, on March 20, 1802, the son of John Bigger, a veteran of the American Revolutionary War and an Ohio House of Representatives Speaker of the House. Because of his father he regularly encountered many of the leading men of the frontier. He attended a log cabin school in Ohio. As a boy, Bigger enjoyed reading books. At age eighteen he contracted a severe cold from which he nearly died. Because of the sickness he was constantly in poor health and his father decided he was unfit for manual labor on the farm and sent him to school where he could learn a profession. Bigger was enrolled as a student at Ohio University in Athens, Ohio, in the 1820s where he studied law.

Bigger moved to Liberty, Indiana, in 1829 after completing school and entered a law practice. There he married Ellen Williamson; the couple never had children. He lived only a short time in Liberty before moving to Rushville where he began his public career. He was partnered in his law office with future United States Senator Oliver H. Smith for a period of time, and later with James Whitcomb and Joseph A. Wright.

=== Legislator and judge ===
In 1833 Bigger was elected to the Indiana House of Representatives. He served three terms until 1835. He was not a great orator, but became known for his simple and straightforward method of speaking. He was narrowly defeated by James Gregory in the election of the house speaker in 1835. The same year he was appointed as a judge on the Indiana Circuit Court where he served until his election as governor.

During the time he was on the court, the state passed the Mammoth Internal Improvement Act to build canals, roads, and railroads across the state. Although the act met with celebration at first, the Panic of 1837 devastated the economy just as the government had taken on a $10 million debt. The situation spiraled out of control as Governor David Wallace attempted to delay the collapse of the states finances and continue work on the projects, which led the debt to increase to $12 million. Along with other debts, the government owed more than $15 million. As the election approached, the Whig Party decided to abandon the governor and run a candidate who had no connection to the failure.

== Governor ==
=== Internal improvements ===
In 1840 Bigger was nominated to become the Whig Party candidate for Governor of Indiana. He was opposed by Democratic candidate Congressman Tilghman Howard. The state's financial status and the failed public works projects were the central debates of the campaign. Bigger claimed to have always opposed the projects and promised to try to get the state out of its dire situation. Howard had been in the assembly and voted for the projects and was branded as a supporter of the failure. Despite the situation of the state, the election was overshadowed by territorial governor William Henry Harrison's campaign for United States President. Years had passed since the state had repudiated his actions as governor, and he had become a popular historical figure and a folk legend in the state. The support he brought to the Whig ticket was enough to return the state Whig Party to their final term of domination of state government. Whigs retained majorities in the General Assembly and Bigger defeated Howard, 62,932 to 54,274.

As Bigger entered office, the interest on the state debt alone was over $500,000 annually while state income was closer to $250,000. The state's credit maxed out during his first year in office and the state defaulted on its debts in July, leading the debt to grow even more quickly. At first, Bigger recommended reforming the property tax system that provided the majority of the state's income. County boards were created to "equalize" property values used to set tax amounts. The result was a massive tax increase of as much as 300% in some areas. The public outcry was so great, and so many people refused to pay their taxes, that the system was repealed in the following year.

The government's primary hope of escaping the situation was to complete the projects, which they believed would produce income to start to cover their costs. The projects were prioritized and it was decided that the most valuable project, the Wabash and Erie Canal, should receive all the available funds. A negotiator was sent to London to negotiate with the state's creditors. The Whitewater Canal, two other smaller canal projects, and the Madison and Indianapolis Railroad were transferred to the creditors in exchange for a 50% reduction in the debt they held, leaving the state owing a total debt of around $9 million. Despite the progress made, the debt was still more than the state could bear, but gained the state more time to try and deal with the problem.

A commission was created, which Bigger oversaw, to investigate the failure of the internal improvements program. The commission alleged corruption of many of the contractors who worked on the projects, claimed the state was misled in many different areas, and was the victim of "imposition and fraud." In its summary, the state had significantly underestimated the costs of the projects, the time they would take to complete, and its own ability to pay for the debt. To complicate matters, no routes had been surveyed for many of the canal projects, which turned out to be unfeasible in the first place.

=== Legal reforms ===
In 1841, at the request of the state legislature, Bigger completely rewrote the state's code of laws with the help of Indiana State Treasurer George H. Dunn. Bigger was well qualified for the job with his background as a lawyer. His new code of laws was passed almost immediately and overwhelmingly by the legislature in 1842.

In 1834, leaders of the Methodist church requested that Governor Bigger appoint Methodists to the board of Indiana University, which was dominated by Presbyterians. Bigger himself was a Presbyterian and refused their request. During a legislative debate on the matter, Bigger said that there was "not a Methodist in America with sufficient learning to fill a professor's chair." He also said the Methodist Church did not require educated preachers, but rather uneducated preachers better suited its members. The quote was printed in state newspapers, and Bigger became the subject of fiery sermons in Methodist churches across the state. Methodists outnumbered Presbyterians four to one in the state at that time, hurting Bigger's popularity. In his reelection campaign again Methodist James Whitcomb, the church, led mainly by Bishop Ames, campaigned heavily on behalf of Whitcomb. Ames was quoted as saying, "it is with the amen corner of the Methodist Church that defeated Governor Bigger, and I had a hand in that". Coupled with the blame the public placed on the Whigs for the state's financial situation, Bigger was overwhelming defeated by Whitcomb.

== Later life ==
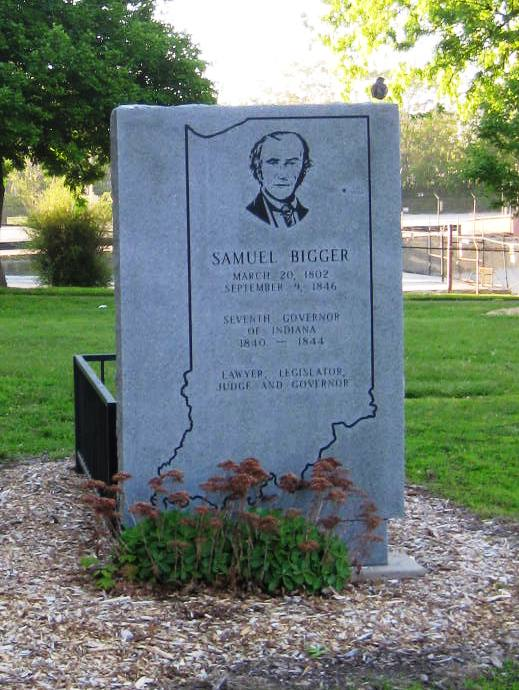
Governor Samuel Bigger's gravesite

After leaving office, Bigger moved to Fort Wayne where he formed a new law practice with Joseph K. Edgerton. The Whig party attempted to nominate Bigger to run for governor again in the 1846 race for governor, but he declined the offer without giving an explanation. He suddenly became ill and died in his Fort Wayne home on September 9, 1846, aged 44, and was buried in that city's McCulloch Park.

The U.S. 27 (Lafayette Street) bridge over the St. Marys River in downtown Fort Wayne was renamed the Governor Samuel Bigger Memorial Bridge by a Resolution of the Indiana General Assembly authored by State Representative Mitchell Harper. Historian Gayle Thornbrough noted that Bigger was among the governors who had the least impact on the events of the day, largely because of the state financial situation.

== See also ==
- List of governors of Indiana

Party political offices
Preceded by David Wallace	Whig nominee for Governor of Indiana; 1840, 1843	Succeeded by Joseph G. Marshall
Political offices
Preceded by David Wallace	Governor of Indiana; December 9, 1840 – December 6, 1843	Succeeded by James Whitcomb
