= 1843 Indiana gubernatorial election =

- August 7, 1843
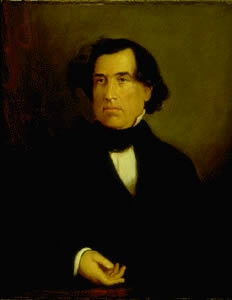

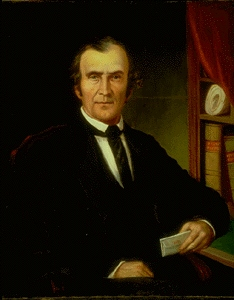
Nominee	James Whitcomb	Samuel Bigger
Party	Democratic	Whig
Popular vote	60,784	58,721
Percentage	50.16%	48.45%
- County results Whitcomb: 40–50% 50–60% 60–70% 70–80% 80–90% Bigger: 40–50% 50–60% 60–70% No Vote/Data
Governor before election
Samuel Bigger
Whig
Elected Governor
James Whitcomb
Democratic

The 1843 Indiana gubernatorial election was held on August 7, 1843, in order to elect the governor of Indiana. Incumbent Whig governor Samuel Bigger lost his re-election bid against Democratic nominee and former member of the Indiana Senate James Whitcomb.

== General election ==
On election day, August 7, 1843, Whig nominee Samuel Bigger lost the election by a margin of 2,063 votes against his opponent Democratic nominee James Whitcomb, thereby gaining Democratic control over the office of governor. Whitcomb was sworn in as the 8th governor of Indiana on December 6, 1843.

=== Results ===
Indiana gubernatorial election, 1843
Party	Candidate	Votes	%
Democratic	James Whitcomb	60,784	50.16
Whig	Samuel Bigger (incumbent)	58,721	48.45
Liberty	Elizur Deming	1,683	1.39
Write-in	William Culbertson	2	0.00
Write-in	William Steele	1	0.00
Total votes		121,191	100.00
Democratic gain from Whig			
