= James Cravens =

James Cravens may refer to:

- James H. Cravens, (1802–1876), U.S. Representative from Indiana
- James A. Cravens, (1818–1893), U.S. Representative from Indiana, second cousin of the above
