= Thomas Smith (Indiana politician) =

American politician

Member of the U.S. House of Representatives from Indiana's 4th district
- In office March 4, 1839 – March 3, 1841
- Preceded by: George H. Dunn
- Succeeded by: James H. Cravens

Member of the U.S. House of Representatives from Indiana's 3rd district
- In office March 4, 1843 – March 3, 1847
- Preceded by: Joseph L. White
- Succeeded by: John L. Robinson

Member of the Indiana Senate
- In office 1836-1839

Member of the Indiana House of Representatives
- In office 1829-1830; 1833-1836

Personal details
- Born: May 1, 1799 Fayette County, Pennsylvania
- Died: April 12, 1876 (aged 76) Versailles, Indiana
- Resting place: Cedar Hill Cemetery
- Party: Democratic
- Occupation: Congressman

Thomas Smith (May 1, 1799 – April 12, 1876) was an American tradesman who served three terms as a member of the United States House of Representatives from Indiana from 1839 to 1841, and again from 1843 to 1847. He was a Democrat.

== Biography ==
Smith was born in Fayette County, Pennsylvania.

=== Early career ===
In 1818, he moved to Rising Sun, Indiana, where he learned the trade of tanning. He then moved to Versailles, Indiana in 1821 and established a tanyard.

Smith eventually became a colonel in the state militia, and member of the Indiana House of Representatives in 1829, 1830, and from 1833 to 1836. He also served in the state senate from 1836 to 1839.

=== Congress ===
Smith was elected as a Democratic Representative for Indiana's 4th congressional district to the Twenty-Sixth Congress, which lasted from March 4, 1839, until March 3, 1841. He was an unsuccessful candidate for election in 1840 to the Twenty-seventh Congress, but was elected in Indiana's 3rd congressional district to the Twenty-eighth and Twenty-ninth Congresses (March 4, 1843 – March 3, 1847). He was not a candidate for renomination in 1846.

While serving in Congress, Smith voted in favor of the United States going to war against Mexico.

Smith was a delegate to the Indiana constitutional convention in 1850.

== Death ==
Smith died in Versailles, Indiana aged 76 and was interred in Cliff Hill Cemetery.

U.S. House of Representatives
Preceded by George H. Dunn	Member of the U.S. House of Representatives from Indiana's 4th congressional district 1839-1841	Succeeded by James H. Cravens
Preceded by Joseph L. White	Member of the U.S. House of Representatives from Indiana's 3rd congressional district 1843-1847	Succeeded by John L. Robinson
