= McCulloch Park =

Public park in Fort Wayne, Indiana, U.S.

Coordinates: 41°4′10.8″N 85°8′59″W

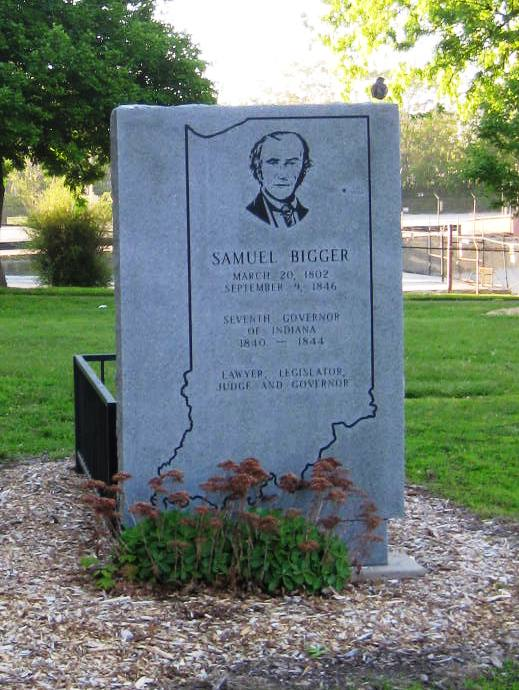
- Governor Samuel Bigger's gravesite.
- Interactive map of McCulloch Park
- Location: Broadway and Parkview Street, Fort Wayne, Indiana
- Area: 4.1 acres (1.7 ha)
- Created: 1986 (acquired)
- Operator: Fort Wayne Parks and Recreation
- Status: Open all year

McCulloch Park is an urban park in the downtown area of Fort Wayne, Indiana. The park is named after former United States Secretary of the Treasury, Hugh McCulloch, who gave the land to the city for a park in 1886. The park is the burial place of Samuel Bigger, the seventh governor of the state of Indiana. The park features a large framed gazebo which was used for band concerts in the 1920s & 1930's. The park has a playground, featuring a swing set, a children's merry go-round, and slide. Once a year during the Three Rivers Festival, the park hosts an antique sale. The park is available by reservation for community functions. This park is adjacent to General Electric, which has been a part of the Fort Wayne economy scene for well over 100 years.
