= Norman B. Judd =

American politician (1815–1878)

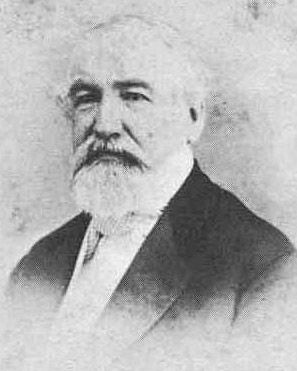

Member of the U.S. House of Representatives from Illinois's 1st district
- In office March 4, 1867 – March 3, 1871
- Preceded by: John Wentworth
- Succeeded by: Charles B. Farwell

United States Envoy to Prussia
- In office July 1, 1861 – September 3, 1865
- President: Abraham Lincoln; Andrew Johnson
- Preceded by: Joseph A. Wright
- Succeeded by: Joseph A. Wright

Member of the Illinois Senate
- In office 1844-1860

Chicago Alderman from the 1st Ward
- In office 1842–1843 Serving with John Calhoun
- Preceded by: John Davlin/ Charles Follansbee
- Succeeded by: Cyrenus Beers/ Hugh T. Dickey

Chicago City Attorney
- In office 1837–1839
- Preceded by: office established
- Succeeded by: Samuel L. Smith

Personal details
- Born: January 10, 1815 Rome, New York, U.S.
- Died: November 11, 1878 (aged 63) Chicago, Illinois, U.S.
- Party: Republican

Norman Buel Judd (January 10, 1815 – November 11, 1878) was a U.S. representative from Illinois, and the grandfather of Norman Judd Gould, a U.S. representative from New York.

== Life and career ==
Born January 10, 1815, in Rome, New York, son of Norman Judd and Catherine Van der Heyden. He received a liberal schooling. He studied law. He was admitted to the bar in 1836 and commenced practice in his hometown.

Judd moved to Chicago in 1836 and continued to practice law. He served as city attorney from 1837 to 1839, and wasva member of the Illinois Senate from 1844 to 1860. He served as delegate to the 1860 Republican National Convention, where was one of the team which worked to win the nomination for Abraham Lincoln. He was appointed Minister Plenipotentiary to the Kingdom of Prussia by President Lincoln on March 6, 1861, and served until 1865.

Judd was elected as a Republican to the Fortieth and Forty-first Congresses (March 4, 1867 – March 3, 1871). He declined to be a candidate for reelection in 1870. He was appointed collector at the port of Chicago by President Ulysses S. Grant on December 5, 1872, and served until his death.

== Personal life and death ==
Judd married Adaline Rossiter on November 27, 1844, in Cook County, Illinois. She was the daughter of Newton Rossiter and Maria Gilbert. She was born February 11, 1821, in Torrington, Connecticut, and died December 19, 1904, in Seneca Falls, New York. They had five children: Frank Rossiter, Norman Rossiter, Julia Seammon, Mary Mitchell and Edward James Judd.

Judd died November 11, 1878, in Chicago at age 63. He was interred in Graceland Cemetery.

Diplomatic posts
Preceded by Joseph A. Wright	United States Envoy to Prussia; July 1, 1861 – September 3, 1865	Succeeded by Joseph A. Wright
U.S. House of Representatives
Preceded by John Wentworth	Member of the U.S. House of Representatives from Illinois's 1st congressional district 1867–1871	Succeeded by Charles B. Farwell
