= John L. Robinson =

American politician

Member of the U.S. House of Representatives from Indiana's 3rd district
- In office March 4, 1847 – March 3, 1853
- Preceded by: Thomas Smith
- Succeeded by: Cyrus L. Dunham

Personal details
- Born: May 3, 1813 near Maysville, Kentucky, U.S.
- Died: March 21, 1860 (aged 46) Rushville, Indiana, U.S.
- Party: Democratic
- Occupation: Merchant

John Larne Robinson (May 3, 1813 – March 21, 1860) was an American politician who served three terms as a U.S. representative from Indiana from 1847 to 1853.

== Biography ==
Born near Maysville, Kentucky, Robinson attended the public schools. He moved to Rush County, Indiana, where he engaged in the mercantile business in Milroy, Indiana. He served as county clerk of Rush County from 1841 to 1845.

=== Congress ===
Robinson was elected as a Democrat to the Thirtieth, Thirty-first, and Thirty-second Congresses (March 4, 1847 – March 3, 1853). He served as chairman of the Committee on Roads and Canals (Thirty-first and Thirty-second Congresses).

=== Later career and death ===
He was appointed by President Franklin Pierce as United States marshal for the southern district of Indiana in 1853. He was reappointed to this post by President James Buchanan in 1858 and served until his death. He was appointed brigade inspector of the fourth military district of Indiana in 1854. Robinson served as a trustee of Indiana University at Bloomington from 1856 to 1859.

He died at Rushville, Indiana, March 21, 1860 and was interred in East Hill Cemetery.

U.S. House of Representatives
| Preceded by Thomas Smith | Member of the U.S. House of Representatives from Indiana's 3rd congressional district 1847–1853 | Succeeded by Cyrus L. Dunham |
