= 1852 Indiana gubernatorial election =

- October 12, 1852
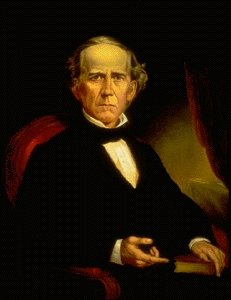

Nominee	Joseph A. Wright	Nicholas McCarty
Party	Democratic	Whig
Popular vote	92,576	73,641
Percentage	54.61%	43.44%
- County results Wright: 40–50% 50–60% 60–70% 70–80% 80–90% McCarty: 40–50% 50–60% 60–70%
Governor before election
Joseph A. Wright
Democratic
Elected Governor
Joseph A. Wright
Democratic

The 1852 Indiana gubernatorial election was held on October 12, 1852.

This was the first election held in October, and the first election for a four-year term, since a new state constitution came into effect in 1851.

Incumbent Democratic Governor Joseph A. Wright defeated Whig nominee Nicholas McCarty and Free Soil nominee Andrew L. Robinson with 54.61% of the vote.

== General election ==
=== Candidates ===
- Nicholas McCarty, Whig, retired businessman
- Andrew L. Robinson, Free Soil, former Speaker of the Indiana House of Representatives
- Joseph A. Wright, Democratic, incumbent Governor

=== Results ===
1852 Indiana gubernatorial election (Note: Some sources give the result as Wright 92,959, McCarty 73,647, Robinson 3,304. The result given is taken from the Indiana State Senate Journal.)
Party	Candidate	Votes	%	±%
Democratic	Joseph A. Wright	92,576	54.61%	
Whig	Nicholas McCarty	73,641	43.44%	
Free Soil	Andrew L. Robinson	3,303	1.95%	
Scattering		2	0.00%	
Majority		18,935	11.17%	
Turnout		169,522		
Democratic hold		Swing		
