= House at 308 South Street =

- U.S. National Register of Historic Places
- The house in November 1985
- Interactive map of House at 308 South Street
- Location: 308 South St., Greenville, Alabama
- Built: circa 1890
- Architectural style: Vernacular
- MPS: Greenville MRA
- NRHP reference No.: 86001856
- Added to NRHP: September 4, 1986

The House at 308 South Street was a historic residence in Greenville, Alabama, United States. The house was built around 1890 and shared a corner lot with the McMullan–Skinner House. The house was a single-story, three-bay frame structure, with a gable roof and a shed-roofed front porch. The interior was a center-hall plan. The house was listed on the National Register of Historic Places in 1986, and demolished sometime before 2008.
