= Joseph L. White =

American politician

Member of the U.S. House of Representatives from Indiana's 3rd district
- In office March 4, 1841 – March 3, 1843
- Preceded by: John Carr
- Succeeded by: Thomas Smith

Personal details
- Born: Joseph Livingston White c. 1813 Cherry Valley, New York, U.S.
- Died: January 12, 1861 Corinto, Nicaragua
- Resting place: Corinto City Cemetery
- Party: Whig

Joseph Livingston White (c. 1813 – January 12, 1861) was an American lawyer and politician who served one term as a U.S. representative from Indiana from 1841 to 1843.

== Biography ==
White was born in Cherry Valley, New York, probably in 1813 or 1814, though the exact date is not known. He was educated in Cherry Valley, attended Rensselaer Polytechnic Institute, studied law in Utica, New York, and was admitted to the bar.

=== Congress ===
After becoming a lawyer, White moved to Madison, Indiana, where he began a practice. He was elected as a Whig to the Twenty-seventh Congress, and served one term, March 4, 1841, to March 3, 1843.

=== Later career ===
After leaving Congress White moved to New York City, where he practiced law and became involved in several business ventures.

In 1848 he opposed the Whig nomination of slaveholder Zachary Taylor for president, and was a delegate to the convention of antislavery Democrats and Conscience Whigs that formed the Free Soil Party and nominated Martin Van Buren to oppose Taylor and Democratic nominee Lewis Cass.

In the 1850s White was president of a company that included his brother David and Cornelius Vanderbilt, which received a contract from the government of Nicaragua to operate steamships and a railroad between the Atlantic and Pacific Oceans, as well as constructing a canal between the oceans. To further his business interests, White became a supporter of William Walker's attempt to overthrow Nicaragua's government.

=== Death in Nicaragua ===
While in Corinto, Nicaragua on January 5, 1861, to lobby for an exclusive contract to produce rubber, he was shot by Jonathan Gavitt, a business rival who was also attempting to receive the rubber production contract. White survived for several days, but died from his injuries on January 12, 1861. He was interred in the Corinto City Cemetery.

Though testimony indicated that Gavitt asked a servant to retrieve his pistol from his hotel room while he sat with White, and that he aimed deliberately, Gavitt claimed his shooting of White was an accident, and he was acquitted.

U.S. House of Representatives
Preceded by John Carr	Member of the U.S. House of Representatives from Indiana's 3rd congressional district 1841-1843	Succeeded by Thomas Smith
