= Indiana ghostlore =

Folk beliefs of Indiana

Numerous narratives and folk beliefs make up the ghostlore of Indiana, a U.S. state in the Midwest, and there are many locations that are considered by locals to be haunted. Some of the hauntings are celebrated in festivals, and most have some history behind them.

== Angola theatre ==
The town of Angola, Indiana has several locations where residents have claimed to have sighted specters. An old theatre sits on the town circle, and some residents claim that at midnight a man with a long red beard appears on the roof of the building pacing back and forth and cries aloud, "Marie please come back to me, please." Movie goers also say that sometimes during movies you can hear a man sobbing in the back of the theatre, but when you look, no one is there.

== Haunted bridges ==
In the town of Avon, Indiana stands a railroad bridge constructed across the White Lick Creek in the 1850s by immigrant Irish workers. Designed by engineer W.M. Dunne, cement was mixed in large narrow vats and hardened into the form of a pylon. According to local legend, while working on the bridge a platform collapsed and a worker fell into the cement vat. As he slowly sank down into the vat, his fellow workers could not reach him in time and they had no way to save him. They could hear him knocking from the inside of the vat. The company decided to continue building rather than tear down the pylon to extract his body.

While the men finished the work on the bridge, and for years afterward, many claimed to hear knocks and screams from inside the pylon. Decades later, when the bridge was torn down, there were a number of sightings of a man wandering along the tracks trying to flag down trains. The haunted bridge is on the official seal to Avon, Indiana. The Big Four Railroad, lifeblood of the connecting arteries in Central Indiana and beyond, required a bridge spanning Country Road 625 and White Lick Creek, so the bridge was built in 1906-1907 and double-tracked in 1908. It is about 300 feet long and 70 feet high, an imposing structure whose image graces the Avon town seal today.

== Diana of the Dunes ==
Near Chesterton, Indiana, in the Indiana Dunes, there is a legend that fishermen around Lake Michigan would occasionally catch sight of a naked woman swimming in the lake. The legend dates back to at least 1915, and goes on to say that a beautiful woman was living as a hermit near the lake. Because no one knew her name they began to refer to her as Dianne, because of her beauty. In actuality, she was Alice Mable Gray, the daughter of a wealthy Chicago family, who had come to live on the dunes after she began to lose her eyesight. She had grown up near the dunes, and sought to enjoy the remainder of her life there. In 1920 a man named Paul Wilson moved into the cabin with her. Local legend claims that Alice's ghost still returns to the beach at the dunes to relive her happier days. For decades there have been sightings of a naked ghostly looking woman running along the beach and disappearing into the lake. The legend is commonly referred to as Diana of the Dunes.

== Whitcomb's library ==
Former Indiana Governor James Whitcomb donated his vast library to Ashbury University—now DePauw University—in his will after his death in 1852. Whitcomb was an avid reader and had amassed a large collection of books in his lifetime, and kept almost every book he had ever read. During the years his library was in public use there were numerous sighting of Whitcomb's ghost trying to protect his books. In one notable incident, a boy had supposedly borrowed The Poems of Ossian from the library. That night, Whitcomb's ghost appeared in his room wailing, "'Ossian! Who stole the Ossian". The next day the boy immediately returned the book to the library and told about the experience. The collection of now rare books is now protected, but there are still occasional sightings of Whitcomb's ghost.

== Sources ==
- Baker, Ronald (1984). Hoosier Folk Legends. Indiana University Press. ISBN 0-253-20334-1.
- Kobrowski Nicole (2008). Encyclopedia of Haunted Indiana. Unseen Press. ISBN 978-0-9774130-2-7.
- Woollen, William Wesley (1975). Biographical and Historical Sketches of Early Indiana. Ayer Publishing. ISBN 0-405-06896-4.
