= Glendale, Indianapolis =

Neighborhood in Indianapolis, Indiana, US

Coordinates: 39°51′57″N 86°06′47″W

Glendale is a neighborhood area located in Indianapolis, Indiana, United States.

== See also ==
- Glendale Town Center
- List of neighborhoods in Indianapolis
