= Paris C. Dunning =

American politician (1806–1884)

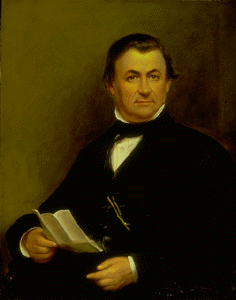

Indiana House of Representatives
- In office December 4, 1833 – December 5, 1836

Indiana State Senate
- In office December 4, 1836 – December 5, 1840
- In office January 5, 1861 – January 9, 1867

10th Lieutenant Governor of Indiana
- In office December 9, 1846 – December 26, 1848
- Governor: James Whitcomb
- Preceded by: Jesse D. Bright
- Succeeded by: James H. Lane

9th Governor of Indiana
- In office December 26, 1848 – December 5, 1849
- Lieutenant: Vacant
- Preceded by: James Whitcomb
- Succeeded by: Joseph A. Wright

Personal details
- Born: Paris Chipman Dunning; March 15, 1806 Greensboro, North Carolina, US
- Died: May 9, 1884 (aged 78) Bloomington, Indiana, US
- Party: Democrat; Independent
- Spouse(s): Sarah Alexander; Mrs. Allen Ashford

Paris Chipman Dunning (March 15, 1806 – May 9, 1884) was a Democratic state representative, state senator, senate president (pro tempore), the tenth lieutenant governor, and the ninth governor of the U.S. state of Indiana from December 26, 1848, to December 5, 1849. He is the only person to hold to every elected seat in the state government under the 1816 constitution. His brief term as governor was marked by the calling of a state constitutional convention and overshadowed by the national anti-slavery debate, where Dunning urged state leaders to issue and forward resolutions to Congress expressing opposition to the expansion of slavery. As a delegate to the subsequent convention, he successfully advocated legislative and educational reform. As the American Civil War broke out, he left the Democratic party and declared for the Union, personally raising many companies of soldiers for the war effort. He returned to the state senate during the war, and then resumed his law practice after his term ended. He remained popular in the state, and declined several nominations to run for office after retiring from politics.

== Early life ==
=== Family and background ===
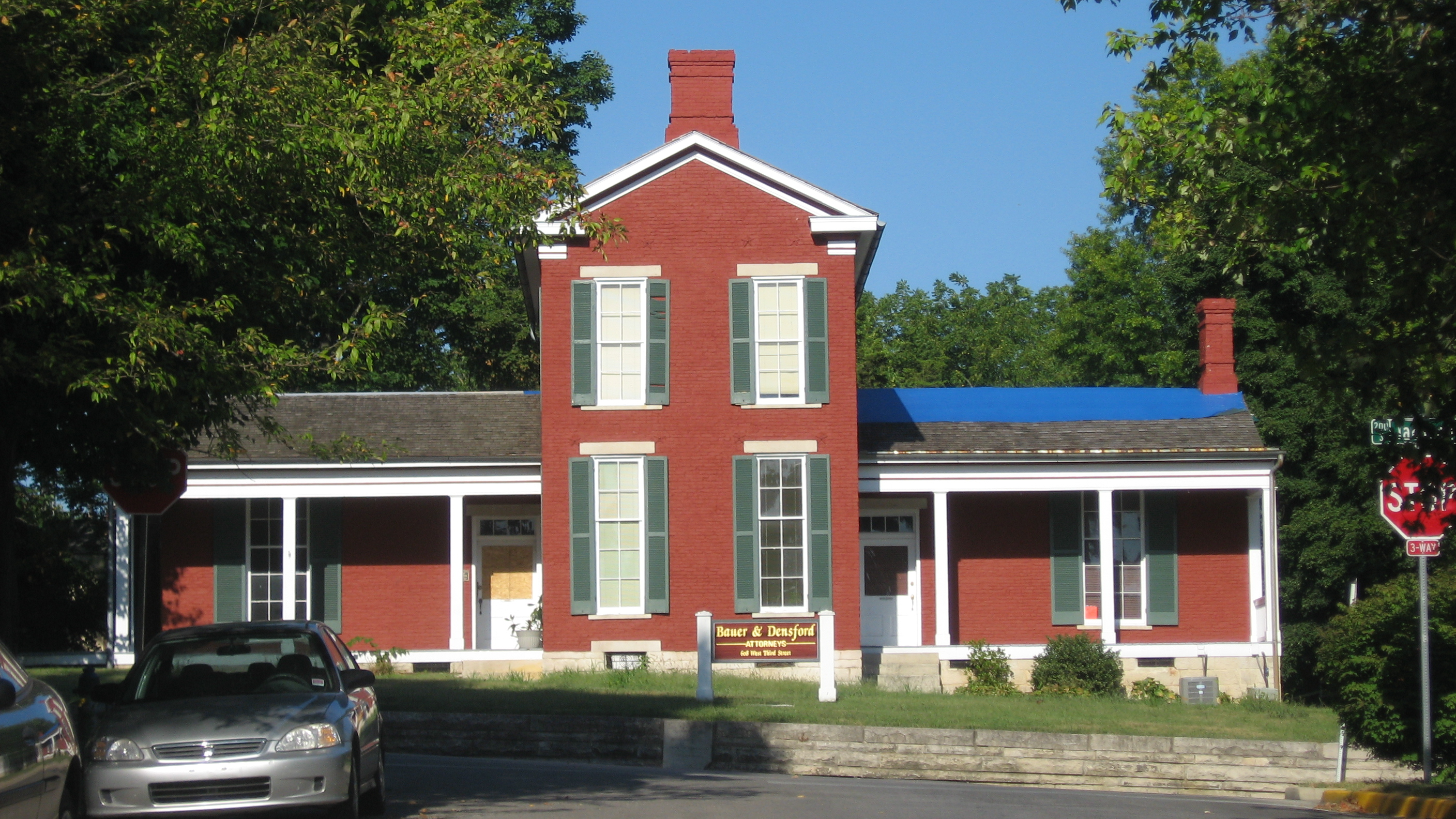
Dunning's house in Bloomington

Dunning was born in 1806 in Greensboro, North Carolina, the youngest of the six sons of James and Rachel North Dunning. He attended the nearby Greensboro Academy and graduated at age seventeen. Upon graduation he enrolled in the state university at Chapel Hill to study medicine. After the death of his father, he, his mother, and one older brother moved to Bloomington, Indiana, where Dunning briefly taught school. There he met Sarah Alexander; the couple married on July 6, 1826, and had four children.

He and his wife moved to Louisville, Kentucky, for a short time to complete his medical training and then he opened a medical practice in Rockville, Indiana. The practice was short lived as he became more interested in law. He returned to his mother and older brother in Bloomington and began to study law in the office of future Governor James Whitcomb and Congressman Tilghman A. Howard before being admitted to the bar in 1833. Working in the law office, he met Indiana's Democratic Party leaders, and impressed many of them who saw him as a potential candidate for office.

== Public office ==
=== Legislator ===
Dunning was elected to represent Monroe County in the Indiana House of Representatives in 1833. He was reelected twice, and served three one years terms, ending in 1836. That year he was elected to the Indiana State Senate representing Monroe and Brown County. During his years in the Indiana General Assembly, he had voted for the Mammoth Internal Improvement Act that had led the state to bankruptcy in 1841. He served two three year terms before opening his Bloomington law practice in 1840. His exit from elected office was probably related to his support of the improvement act. He continued to be active in the party, and was a presidential elector in 1844, and cast his vote for James K. Polk.

In 1846 Whitcomb ran for his second term as governor of Indiana. Whitcomb choose Dunning to run as his Lieutenant Governor, and their ticket won. Dunning served in the position until Whitcomb was elected to the United States Senate in December 1848. Whitcomb resigned from office and Dunning was elevated to his seat.

=== Governor ===
Dunning served a brief term, but it was a time of several momentous events in the state. Indiana had just emerged from a period of bankruptcy, and Dunning oversaw the final phase of the process, ensuring the public works were turned over to the state's creditors and that the debt reduction deal was fully carried out. Congress was debating the extension of slavery in the western territories during his term, leading to bitter hostilities between northern and southern leaders. Dunning delivered a speech to the General Assembly in which he condemned the expansion of slavery and called for its gradual elimination. He was the first outspoken anti-slavery governor since William Hendricks, and he recommended the assembly pass a resolution for him to forward to Congress. In response, the assembly passed a strong resolution requesting Indiana's congressional delegation to oppose the expansion of slavery.

Governor Whitcomb had already started a movement in the legislature to call a constitutional convention, and Dunning continued to support the effort to have a ballot initiative to replace the constitution. Dunning left office in 1849 and returned to his law practice.

== Later life ==
=== Constitutional convention ===
In 1850, voters approved a ballot to authorize the formation of a constitutional convention to replace the Indiana Constitution. Dunning was one of the most prominent delegates to attend the convention and took the lead in pushing for several reforms. Among his proposals was a ban on special legislation, because the legislature had become notorious for passing laws that were only applied to certain counties or towns. Dunning was able to have a clause entered into article 4 of the constitution that required all laws passed by the assembly to be applied uniformly across the entire state, ending the practice.

His position on public schools was also added to article 8 of the constitution. The state's literacy rate had dropped from 90% in 1840, to 80% in 1850, and having served on the board of Indiana University between 1841 and 1868, he became aware of the poor condition of public education in the state. His proposals guaranteed equal opportunity for women in public education, something unknown in most of the nation. He also strengthened the free common school cause by requiring the state to fund the public school system, while allowing local school boards to maintain control of their districts' curriculum, hiring, and school arrangements.

=== Final years ===
Dunning was nominated by the Democratic party to run for Congress in 1856, but he declined primarily due to the fractured nature of the party at that time. He, along with a large part of the party, was at odds with its state leadership who were sympathetic to the south. In 1860 he did accept a nomination to be a delegate to the party's convention in Charleston, South Carolina, and the second convention held in Baltimore. In both convention he voted in favor of Stephen Douglas, and favored compromise on the slavery issue. When the American Civil War finally broke out in the next year, Dunning publicly declared himself for the Union and set to work raising companies of men for the war effort. In the end, he was personally responsible to the recruitment of nearly two full regiments of men.

In 1861, he left the Democratic party, and was reelected to the state senate as an Independent and supported the Republican governor throughout the war. Governor Oliver P. Morton had a stroke in 1865, and traveled to Europe for treatment and Conrad Baker became acting governor. Dunning was then elected president pro tempore of the senate to fill Baker's place. Dunning's wife died in 1863 and Dunning remarried to the widow of Allen Ashford on September 17, 1865. When his term in the Senate ended in 1867, he was nominated to run again, but declined. He declined a second offer to run for Congress in 1868, preferring to remain in his law practice. Dunning gained a national reputation as a lawyer, and was committed to criminal law. His reputation was such that his clients were "assured of success when he was on the case."

Dunning continued to be active in public affairs, despite refusing to take public office. He continued to be active in his law practice, hearing cases until a week before his death. Dunning died on May 9, 1884, aged 78, in Bloomington, Indiana, and is buried there in Rose Hill Cemetery.

== See also ==
- List of governors of Indiana

Political offices
Preceded by Jesse D. Bright	Lieutenant Governor of Indiana; December 9, 1846 – December 26, 1848	Succeeded by James H. Lane
Preceded by James Whitcomb	Governor of Indiana; December 26, 1848 – December 5, 1849	Succeeded by Joseph A. Wright
