= Prospect Hill Historic District (Bloomington, Indiana) =

Historic district in Indiana, United States

- U.S. National Register of Historic Places
- U.S. Historic district
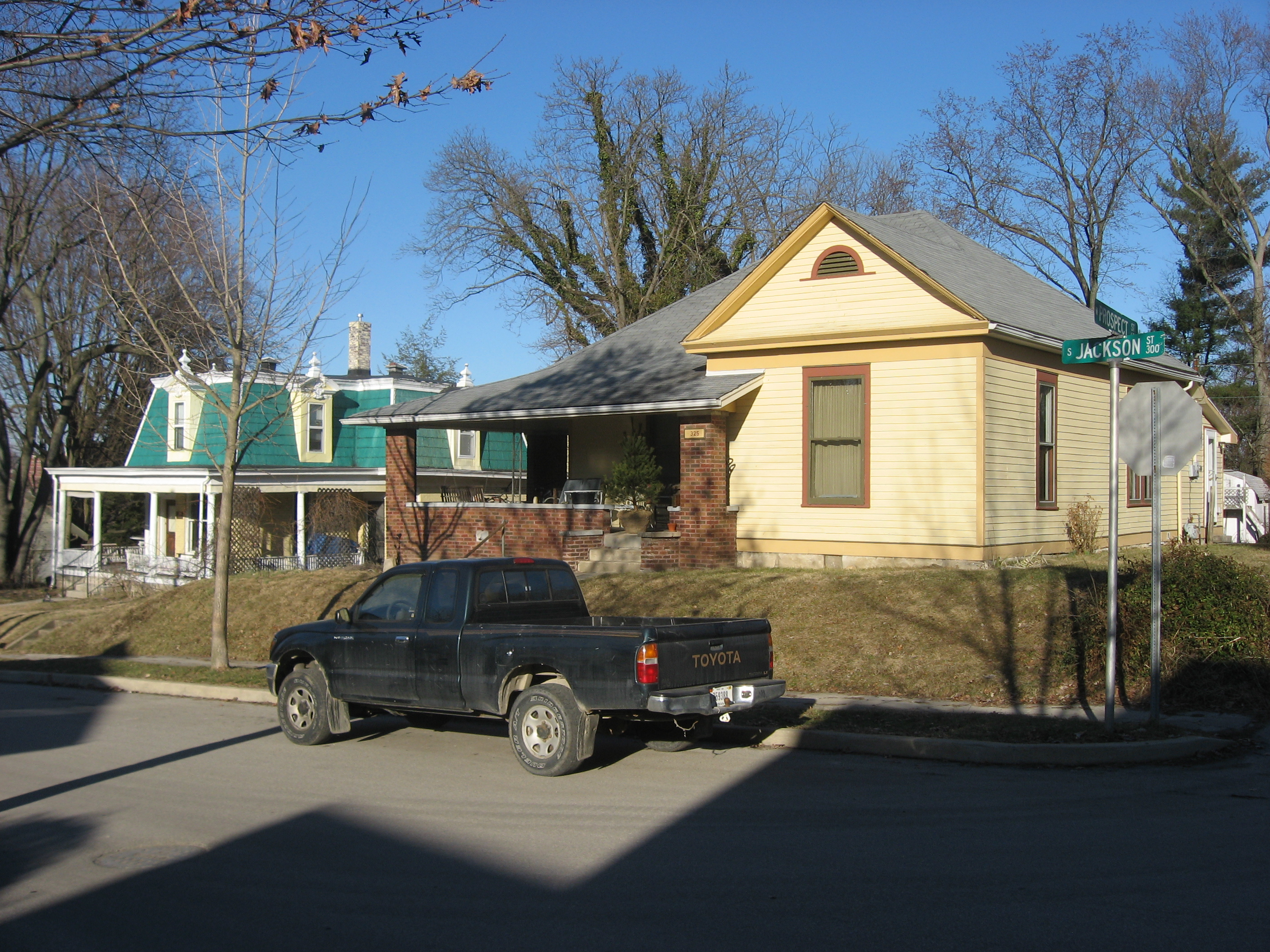
- Prospect Hill Historic District, November 2009

- Location within Indiana Location within the United States
- Location: Roughly bounded by 3rd, Rogers, Smith and Jackson Sts., Bloomington, Indiana
- Coordinates: 39°09′50″N 86°32′20″W
- Area: 6 acres (2.4 ha)
- Architect: Nichols, John Lincoln
- Architectural style: Late 19th And 20th Century Revivals, Queen Anne, Gabled Ell
- NRHP reference No.: 91000272
- Added to NRHP: March 14, 1991

Prospect Hill Historic District is a national historic district located at Bloomington, Indiana. The district encompasses 38 contributing buildings and eight contributing structures in a predominantly residential section of Bloomington. It developed between about 1840 and 1936, and includes notable examples of Queen Anne, Colonial Revival, Tudor Revival, Mission Revival, and Bungalow/American Craftsman style architecture. Located in the district is the separately listed Blair-Dunning House.

It was listed on the National Register of Historic Places in 1991.
