= James H. Cravens =

American politician

James Cravens
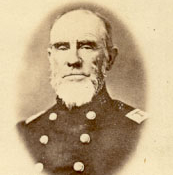

Member of the U.S. House of Representatives from Indiana's 4th district
- In office March 4, 1841 – March 3, 1843
- Preceded by: Thomas Smith
- Succeeded by: Caleb B. Smith

Personal details
- Born: August 12, 1802 Harrisonburg, Virginia, U.S.
- Died: December 4, 1876 (aged 74) Osgood, Indiana, U.S
- Party: Free Soil Party
- Other political affiliations: Whig (before 1852)

Military service
- Branch/service: Union Army
- Rank: Lieutenant colonel
- Unit: 83rd Regiment, Indiana Volunteer Infantry
- Battles/wars: American Civil War

James Harrison Cravens (August 12, 1802 – December 4, 1876) was an American lawyer, Civil War veteran, and politician who was a one-term U.S. representative from Indiana from 1841 to 1843. He was a second cousin of James Addison Cravens.

== Biography ==
Born on August 12, 1802, in Harrisonburg, Virginia, Cravens studied law. He was admitted to the bar in 1823 and began practicing law in Harrisonburg. He moved to Franklin, Pennsylvania, in 1823 and resumed the practice of law. Later, he moved to Madison, Indiana, in 1829 and engaged in agricultural pursuits.

He served as a member of the State House of Representatives in 1831 and 1832. He moved to Ripley County, Indiana, in 1833, where he practiced law and managed a farm. He served as a member of the State Senate in 1839.

=== Congress ===
Cravens was elected as a Whig to the Twenty-seventh Congress (March 4, 1841 – March 4, 1843). He was an unsuccessful candidate of the Free-Soil Party for Governor of Indiana in 1849, and a member of the State House of Representatives in 1856. He was an unsuccessful candidate for election to the attorney generalship of the State in 1856.

=== Civil War ===
He served as lieutenant colonel of the Eighty-third Regiment, Indiana Volunteer Infantry, in the Civil War. During Morgan's raid in Indiana, he and his soldiers were taken captive.

=== Death and burial ===
He died in Osgood, Indiana, December 4, 1876, and was interred in Versailles Cemetery, Versailles, Indiana.

U.S. House of Representatives
Preceded by Thomas Smith	Member of the U.S. House of Representatives from Indiana's 4th congressional district 1841-1843	Succeeded by Caleb B. Smith
