= Single- and double-pen architecture =

Single-pen architecture and double-pen architecture are architectural styles for design of log, and sometimes stone or brick pioneer houses found in the United States. A single pen is just one unit: a rectangle of four walls of a log cabin. In double pen architecture, two log pens are built and those are joined by a roof over a breezeway in between. A saddlebag house is a subset of double-pen architecture with two rooms, a central chimney, and one or two front doors.

== See also ==
- Dog trot architecture
- Central-passage house
- Slave pen
