= James Whitcomb =

American politician (1795–1852)

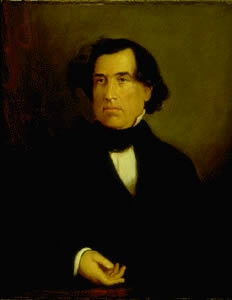
- Posthumous portrait

8th Governor of Indiana
- In office December 6, 1843 – December 27, 1848
- Lieutenant: Jesse D. Bright; Paris C. Dunning
- Preceded by: Samuel Bigger
- Succeeded by: Paris C. Dunning

Indiana State Senate
- In office December 5, 1830 – December 4, 1836

United States Senator from Indiana
- In office March 4, 1849 – October 4, 1852
- Preceded by: Edward A. Hannegan
- Succeeded by: Charles W. Cathcart

Personal details
- Born: December 1, 1795 Windsor County, Vermont, US
- Died: October 4, 1852 (aged 56) New York City, US
- Resting place: Crown Hill Cemetery and Arboretum, Section 9, Lot 38; 39.8169661°N 86.1720549°W
- Party: Democrat
- Spouse: Martha Ann Hurst
- Relations: Claude Matthews (son-in-law)
- Children: Martha Renick Whitcomb
- Education: Transylvania University

James Whitcomb (December 1, 1795 – October 4, 1852) was a United States senator and the eighth governor of Indiana. As governor during the Mexican–American War, he oversaw the formation and deployment of the state's levies. He led the movement to replace the state constitution and played an important role at the convention to institute a law that prevented the government from taking loans in response the current fiscal crisis in Indiana. By skillfully guiding the state through its bankruptcy, Whitcomb is usually credited as being one of the most successful of Indiana's governors. He was elected to the United States Senate after his term as governor but died of kidney disease only three years later.

== Early life ==
=== Family and background ===
James Whitcomb was born in Rochester, Vermont, on December 1, 1795, the fourth of ten children of John W. and Lydia Parmenter Whitcomb. In 1806 his family moved to Cincinnati, Ohio, where they farmed land. Whitcomb loved to read books, but his father would often discourage him from reading, believing that his son needed to take up manual labor to have a successful future. Instead, young Whitcomb taught school and attended Transylvania University in Kentucky, where he studied law and adopted many southern customs. After returning to the north, he became known for his "fastidious dress and elegant manners", and was often criticized during his life for being a fop. Whitcomb loved music, and was able to play many different instruments, but his favorite was the violin. He became well known for his talented playing and would often dance, sing, and play for friends throughout his life.

After graduating in 1819 he moved to Fayette County, Kentucky, where he was admitted to the bar and, in March 1822, began to practice law. He moved to Bloomington, Indiana, in 1824, where he continued to practice law. In Bloomington he quickly became respected in the community. Whitcomb was appointed as prosecuting attorney for Monroe County, Indiana by Governor James B. Ray and served from 1826 to 1829. His position earned him some fame in the area because of several high-profile cases that he successfully prosecuted.

=== Early political career ===
In 1830, he was elected to serve as a member of the Indiana Senate. Other senators noted Whitcomb's addiction to tobacco, and that he was almost always smoking a cigar. In the Senate Whitcomb was the most outspoken of the anti-internal-improvement men. He was one of only nine men to speak against the Mammoth Internal Improvement Act in the Senate debate, his chief cohorts being Dennis Pennington, Calvin Fletcher and John Durmont. Despite their protests the bill was passed, and he voted for it after a meeting with his own constituents who asked him to "go for it".

Whitcomb was appointed by President Andrew Jackson to serve as the Commissioner of the General Land Office in Washington, D.C., from 1836 until 1841. He probably secured the post with the help of Congressman Ratliff Boon. While in office he undertook the study of French and Spanish so that he was able to read the land treaties, and became fluent in both languages. His primary work was overseeing the survey of large tracts of land in Iowa and Wisconsin and dealing with land disputes in the recently purchased Florida Territory. Upon resigning from the Land Office in 1841, Whitcomb moved to Terre Haute, where he eventually launched his campaign as the Democratic gubernatorial candidate.

== Governor ==
=== First term ===
In 1843 he authored a pamphlet entitled "Facts for the People" in which he made a case against the federal government's adoption of protective tariffs. The pamphlet was popular and widely read in the state. That year he was nominated as the Democratic candidate for governor. The Whigs, who had been the primary backers of the internal improvements, had come under increasing criticism in the term of Samuel Bigger. The program had completely broken down in 1841 and most of the state's investment in the projects was lost. The state had negotiated a partial bankruptcy by the transfer of the project to the state's creditors, in exchange for a reduction in the state's outstanding debt. Despite this progress, the debt was still too large for the state to bear and the situation was still dire. Whitcomb campaigned on the issue and overcame the Whigs, who received most of the public blame for the debacle. Bigger, a Presbyterian, had made disparaging comments against Methodists during the campaign. Whitcomb, who was a Methodist, played up the statements and gained a great deal of support from the large Methodist community, as Bigger became the object of fiery sermons in their churches. Whitcomb won the election and defeated incumbent Governor Samuel Bigger in a close election, 60,784 votes to Bigger's 58,721 with 1,683 going to Elizur Demming, who was fielded by the newly formed anti-slavery Liberty Party. The victory was a swing of 10,000 votes from the last election.

Upon his election, he found the government coffers empty, as the state had exhausted itself in an attempt to recover from overspending on internal improvements during the 1830s. During his term, the government began to recover from the losses of the internal improvements. The Bigger administration had overseen a large reduction in the state's debt, but the government was still unable to make headway on the nine-million dollar debt that still existed. During his first term, he advocated major spending cuts, including large cuts in government employee wages. Those cuts, along with steadily improving state revenues, enabled the government to manage its debt during his first term in office.

Whitcomb advocated the creation of the Indiana School for the Deaf, and an asylum for the mentally insane. Both acts were passed, but funding was delayed until the state's financial crisis could be resolved. As his first term ended, he announced he would seek reelection. Touting the success of current measures to resolve the debt situation, Whitcomb won reelection with 64,104 votes to 60,138 to Whig Joseph G. Marshall, and 2,301 going to Liberty candidate Stephen Stevens.

=== Second term ===
In 1845 the state became insolvent again. Charles Butler, a representative of the state's debt-holders, arrived to negotiate a second bankruptcy. In exchange for partial ownership of the Wabash and Erie Canal, the only successful public works project, the debt-holders agreed to an additional reduction of the state's total debt to about $4 million, $3 million of which was from the internal improvement projects. The creditors agreed to refinance the debt, which enabled the state to lower the interest rates that it paid on its bonds. Although the debt still consumed nearly half of the government budget, it had reached a level which the growing state could accommodate. With the passage of the Butler Bill in 1847, the state's financial crisis was finally nearing its end.

Whitcomb married his wife, the wealthy widow Martha Ann Renick Hurts, on March 24, 1846. The couple soon had a baby girl, on July 1, 1847. The pregnancy was difficult for his wife, and she died only sixteen days after giving birth. The death was very troubling to Whitcomb, who shut himself away for several days. His daughter grew up to marry a prominent Terre Haute lawyer, Claude Matthews, who was elected governor of Indiana in 1896.

The United States declared war on Mexico during Whitcomb's second term, and he was responsible for meeting the military quotas set forth for the state during the Mexican–American War. The state was ill-equipped for the war because of the ongoing financial troubles. The militia system had been abandoned once the threat of Indian raids had ceased, and the state arsenal was nearly devoid of weapons. The militia had come to be derided as the "cornstalk militia"; due to a lack of weapons and uniforms, they drilled with cornstalks as rifles and tassels in their caps.

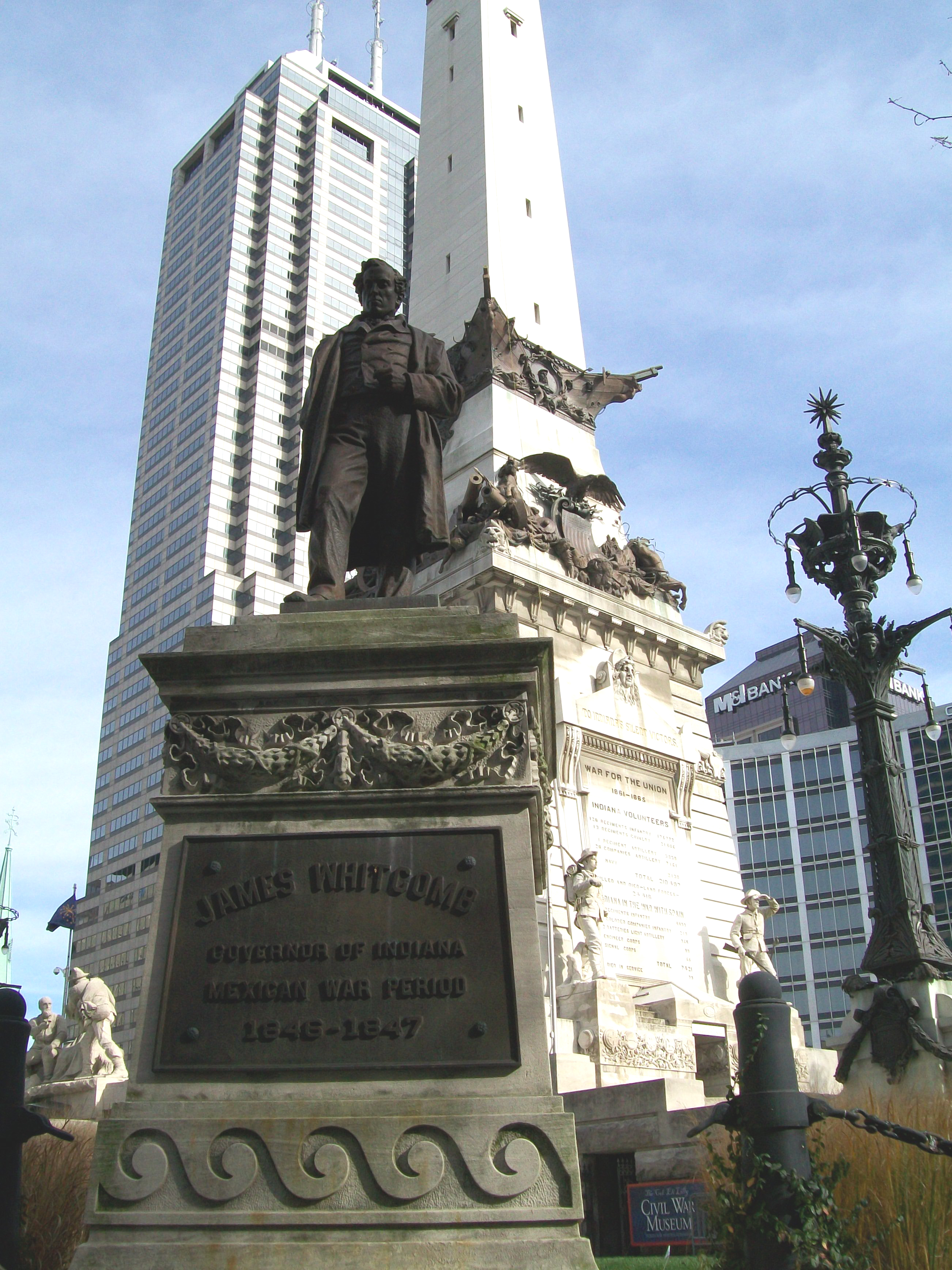
Statue of James Whitcomb at the Soldiers' and Sailors' Monument

The conflict had been unforeseen, and no money could be appropriated for the expense. With the state's credit in ruins, the prospect of borrowing money for such purposes from out-of-state lenders was unlikely. With the legislature out of session and the state's coffers empty, Whitcomb had no funds for the enterprise. On May 26, Whitcomb took a personal loan, on his own credit, for $10,000 from the Bank of Indiana's Madison branch, which he used to purchase arms for the state's regiments. The same day he sent letters to other branches of the bank requesting equivalent loans from them, which allowed the state to muster the five regiments that had been requested by the Federal Government. Once the General Assembly convened, they repaid what he had paid from his own pocket and assumed his outstanding debts to the bank. For his role as a war-time governor, a bronze statue of Whitcomb was placed in Monument Circle in Indianapolis.

Whitcomb's most unpopular act as governor was his refusal to reappoint Indiana Supreme Court Justices Sullivan and Dewey. Whitcomb criticized them for allowing the docket to get backed up, and claimed that younger men were required to catch it back up. His refusal to act was one of the leading factors in the change to the method in which justices are appointed in the 1851 constitution. This was because the General Assembly was unhappy with his position, but it had no way of overriding it. In 1848, the Democrats took strong majorities in both houses of the Assembly. In his address to the legislature that year, he called for a constitutional convention to deal with several constitutional issues. In addition to the matter of appointing justices, another issue was the removal of the state's authorization to take loans, and there were other needed governmental reforms, as well.

Speaking of his profession, Whitcomb once said,

Follow one line of thought and research with your whole mind and soul; take no active part in politics until maturity has brought you settled thought. The life of a politician is not always reputable; it has so many elements of deceit and dishonesty that it is hard to follow it and keep clean one's hands and soul.

Whitcomb was a very active Mason. He became the first person to be knighted as a Masonic Knights Templar in Indiana, on May 20, 1848. He organized a Masonic lodge which for several years met in his home. He was always proud of his relationship with the Masons, and the Raper Commandery No. 1], Knights Templar, was established in his home where it met for several years before building a lodge.

== Senator and death ==
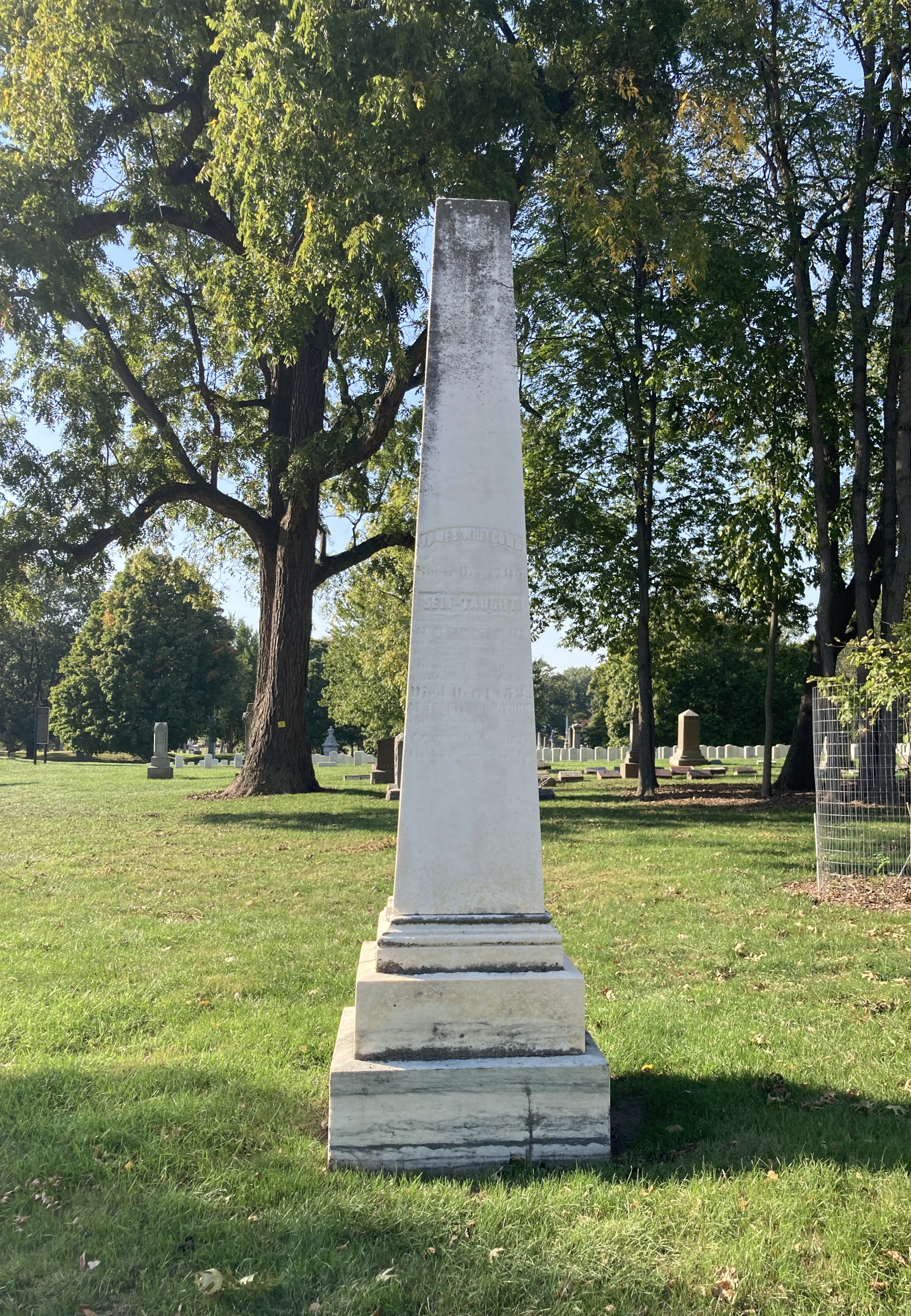
Whitcomb's grave at Crown Hill Cemetery

In 1848, before his second term ended, Whitcomb was elected by the legislature to become a member of the United States Senate. He resigned as governor and served in the Senate from 1849 until his death in 1852, and was a staunch opponent of tariffs. While in Washington, D.C., he served several years as the Vice-President of the American Bible Society, remaining in that position until his death. He became afflicted by kidney stones and sought medical treatment in New York City for kidney disease. He died from the illness in New York City on October 4, 1852. His remains were returned to Indianapolis, to be buried in Greenlawn Cemetery, where the state erected a monument over his grave. On July 27, 1892, his daughter had his body exhumed and moved to Crown Hill Cemetery next to the grave of Oliver P. Morton.

In his will, Whitcomb left his large private library and part of his estate to the Methodist Indiana Asbury College (now known as DePauw University). He also left a large donation for the American Bible Association. His library is thought to be haunted by some of its patrons. There is a statue of Whitcomb on Monument Circle in Indianapolis.

James Whitcomb Riley's father was a close friend of Whitcomb and named his son after the governor. Whitcomb's pamphlet on tariffs became popular again after his death and was circulated nationally during the failed reelection campaign of Benjamin Harrison, who was a proponent of tariffs. Whitcomb was not the most popular of Indiana's politicians and gained many enemies during his time in office, but was well respected and remembered as one of Indiana's most important governors.

== See also ==
- List of members of the United States Congress who died in office (1790–1899)
- List of governors of Indiana

Party political offices
Preceded by Tilghman Howard	Democratic nominee for Governor of Indiana; 1843, 1846	Succeeded by Joseph A. Wright
Political offices
Preceded by Samuel Bigger	Governor of Indiana; December 6, 1843 – December 27, 1848	Succeeded by Paris C. Dunning
U.S. Senate
Preceded by Edward A. Hannegan	U.S. senator (Class 3) from Indiana; 1849–1852; Served alongside: Jesse D. Bright	Succeeded by Charles W. Cathcart
Government offices
Preceded by Ethan Allen Brown	Commissioner of the General Land Office; 1836–1841	Succeeded by Elisha Mills Huntington
