= 1968 Indiana gubernatorial election =

- November 5, 1968
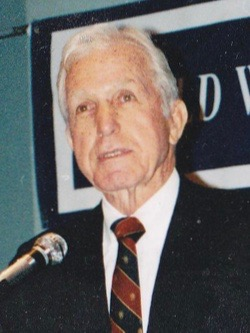

Nominee	Edgar Whitcomb	Robert L. Rock
Party	Republican	Democratic
Popular vote	1,080,271	965,816
Percentage	52.72%	47.13%
- County results Whitcomb: 40–50% 50–60% 60–70% 70–80% Rock: 50–60%
Governor before election
Roger D. Branigin
Democratic
Elected Governor
Edgar Whitcomb
Republican

The 1968 Indiana gubernatorial election was held on November 5, 1968.

Incumbent Democratic Governor Roger D. Branigin was term-limited.

Republican nominee Edgar Whitcomb defeated Democratic nominee Robert L. Rock with 52.72% of the vote.

== Nominations ==
Until 1976, all nominations for statewide office in Indiana were made by state conventions.

=== Democratic nomination ===
==== Candidates ====
- Richard C. Bodine, former Speaker of the Indiana House of Representatives
- Robert L. Rock, incumbent Lieutenant Governor

==== Results ====
The Democratic convention was held on June 21, 1968.

Democratic convention results
Party	Candidate	Votes	%
Democratic	Robert L. Rock	953	49.33
Democratic	Richard C. Bodine	951	49.23
	Absent/not voting	28	1.45
Total votes		1,932	100.00

=== Republican primary ===
==== Candidates ====
- Dr. Otis Bowen, Speaker of the Indiana House of Representatives
- Earl Butz, former Assistant United States Secretary of Agriculture
- Edgar Whitcomb, incumbent Secretary of State of Indiana

==== Results ====
The Republican convention was held on June 18, 1968.

Republican convention results
Party	Candidate	Votes	%
Republican	Edgar Whitcomb	1,260	56.86
Republican	Otis Bowen	527	23.78
Republican	Earl Butz	429	19.36
Total votes		2,216	100.00

== General election ==
=== Governor ===
==== Candidates ====
- Melvin E. Hawk, Prohibition
- Robert L. Rock, Democratic
- Edgar Whitcomb, Republican

==== Results ====
1968 Indiana gubernatorial election
Party	Candidate	Votes	%	±%
Republican	Edgar Whitcomb	1,080,271	52.72%	
Democratic	Robert L. Rock	965,816	47.13%	
Prohibition	Melvin E. Hawk	2,985	0.15%	
Majority		114,455	5.59%	
Turnout		2,049,072	100.00%	
Republican gain from Democratic		Swing		

=== Lieutenant governor ===
1968 Indiana lieutenant gubernatorial election
Party	Candidate	Votes	%	±%
Republican	Richard E. Folz	1,086,704	54.00%	
Democratic	James W. Beatty	922,352	45.83%	
Prohibition	James G. Harkless	3,277	0.16%	
Majority		164,352	8.17%	
Turnout		2,012,333	100.00%	
Republican gain from Democratic		Swing		

== Bibliography ==
- Gubernatorial Elections, 1787-1997. Washington, D.C.: Congressional Quarterly Inc. 1998. ISBN 1-56802-396-0.
- Scammon, Richard M., ed. (1970). America Votes 8: a handbook of contemporary American election statistics, 1968. Washington, D.C.: Governmental Affairs Institute.
- Brown, Otis R.; Du Bois, William (2000). Doc: Memories from a Life in Public Service. Bloomington, Illinois: Indiana University Press. ISBN 0-253-33767-4.
