= Alfred Ahner =

National Guard of the United States general

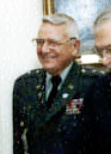

Adjutant General of Indiana
- In office 1972–1986
- Governor: Edgar Whitcomb (1972-1973); Otis Bowen (1973-1981); Robert D. Orr (1981-1986)
- Preceded by: John M. Owens
- Succeeded by: MG Carl G. Farrell
- In office 1960–1961
- Governor: Harold W. Handley
- Preceded by: John W. McConnell
- Succeeded by: John S. Anderson

Personal details
- Born: November 12, 1921 Huntington, Indiana
- Died: September 23, 2010 (aged 88)

Military service
- Allegiance: United States
- Branch/service: United States Army
- Rank: First Lieutenant
- Battles/wars: World War II
- Awards: Legion of Merit; Meritorious Service Medal; Commendation Medal; Good Conduct Medal; American Campaign Medal; European Theatre Medal; World War II Victory Medal; Army of Occupation Medal; Armed Forces Reserve Medal; Reserve Good Conduct Medal

Major General Alfred Frederick Ahner (November 12, 1921 – September 23, 2010) was an Indiana National Guard officer who served for 15 years as the state's Adjutant General.

Ahner was born in Huntington, Indiana, and was a graduate of Indiana Central College (B.A., 1947) and Butler University (M.S., 1951). He enlisted in the Army Enlisted Reserve Corps on August 22, 1942 and served in World War II as a 1st Lieutenant, and was the first De-Nazification Officer in the American Zone of Vienna, Austria.

After serving as a full-time staff officer with the Indiana Guard, Ahner was appointed as Adjutant General in 1960 by Governor Harold Handley. Governor Edgar Whitcomb also appointed MG Ahner in 1972, and he served until his retirement in 1986. MG Ahner served in that position longer than any other Adjutant General in the state's history, a total of 15 years, under 4 governors.

== Awards and decorations ==
During his military service he was awarded: Legion of Merit, Meritorious Service Medal, Commendation Ribbon with Medal Pendant, Good Conduct Medal, American Campaign Medal, European Theatre Medal with Three Battle Stars for Ground Combat in Rhineland, Ardennes-Alsace and Central Europe, World War II Victory Medal, Army Occupation Medal-Germany, Armed Forces Reserve Medal, Army Reserve Components Achievement Medal, National Guard Minute Man Award, Certificate of Commendation from General Mark Clark, Indiana Distinguished Service Medal, Indiana Commendation Medal with Oak Leaf Cluster, Indiana Long Service Medal, Indiana Volunteer Emblem, Indiana Emergency Service Ribbon, Army National Guard Recruiter Badge, Selective Service System Meritorious Service Award and NGAUS Distinguished Service Medal.
