= Vernon Kniptash =

Vernon E. Kniptash was an Indianapolis engineer and a corporal during World War I. He kept a diary which is published under the title On the Western Front with the Rainbow Division.

Kniptash was born in Terre Haute, Indiana but his family moved to Indianapolis and he graduated from Emmerich Manual High School in 1914. He then enlisted in the First Indiana Field Artillery, which was later activated as the 150th Field Artillery Regiment. The 150th Field Artillery deployed to Europe as part of the 42nd Infantry Division. Kniptash was originally assigned to Battery A, but also served as a radio operator for regimental headquarters, and kept a diary.

The 150th Field Artillery returned to the United States in late April 1919, and Kniptash returned to Indiana in May. He found a job with Vonnegut & Bohn, eventually earning a license as a structural engineer, despite his lack of college education. He lost his position during the Great Depression, but was able to find other work, including with the Army Corps of Engineers at Indiana Dunes.

After Kniptash's death in 1987, his wartime diaries were discovered by his family, along with photos and other items from World War I. They were published as a book in 2009. The diary, along with those of Elmer Straub and Elmer Sherwood, give different perspectives of enlisted soldiers in the 150th Field Artillery.
