= Crawford F. Parker =

American politician (1906–1986)

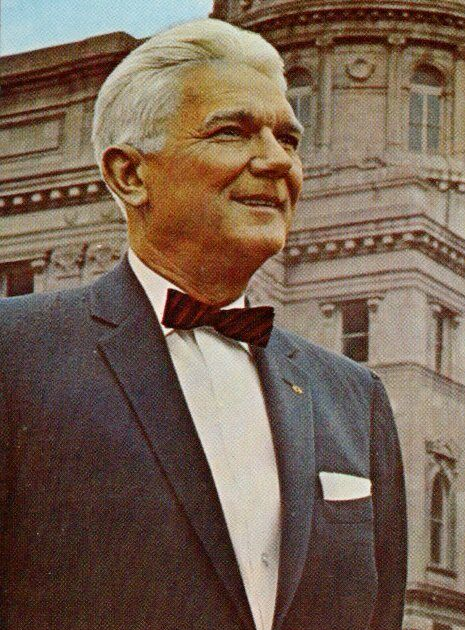

40th Lieutenant Governor of Indiana
- In office January 14, 1957 – January 9, 1961
- Governor: Harold W. Handley
- Preceded by: Harold W. Handley
- Succeeded by: Richard O. Ristine

47th Secretary of State of Indiana
- In office December 1, 1952 – December 1, 1956
- Governor: George N. Craig
- Preceded by: Leland L. Smith
- Succeeded by: Frank A. Lennings

Personal details
- Born: September 20, 1906 Danville, Indiana, U.S.
- Died: February 15, 1986 (aged 79) Fort Lauderdale, Florida, U.S.
- Party: Republican

Crawford Fairbanks Parker (September 20, 1906 – February 15, 1986) was an American politician from the U.S. state of Indiana. Between 1957 and 1961 he served as Lieutenant Governor of Indiana. In 1960, he was the Republican nominee for Governor of Indiana, but narrowly lost to Democrat Matthew Welsh.

== Life ==
Crawford Parker was born in Danville, Indiana. He joined the Republican Party and between 1952 and 1952 he was the Secretary of State of Indiana. In 1956 he was elected to the office of the Lieutenant Governor of Indiana and he served in this position between January 14, 1957, and January 9, 1961, when his term ended. In this function he was the deputy of Governor Harold W. Handley and he presided over the Indiana Senate. Crawford Parker died on February 15, 1986, in Fort Lauderdale in Florida. In 1960 he ran unsuccessfully for the governor's office of his state.

Party political offices
Preceded by Harold W. Handley	Republican nominee for Governor of Indiana; 1960	Succeeded by Richard O. Ristine
Political offices
Preceded by Leland L. Smith	Secretary of State of Indiana; 1952–1956	Succeeded by Frank A. Lennings
Preceded by Harold W. Handley	Lieutenant Governor of Indiana; 1957–1961	Succeeded by Richard O. Ristine
