= 1956 Indiana gubernatorial election =

- November 6, 1956
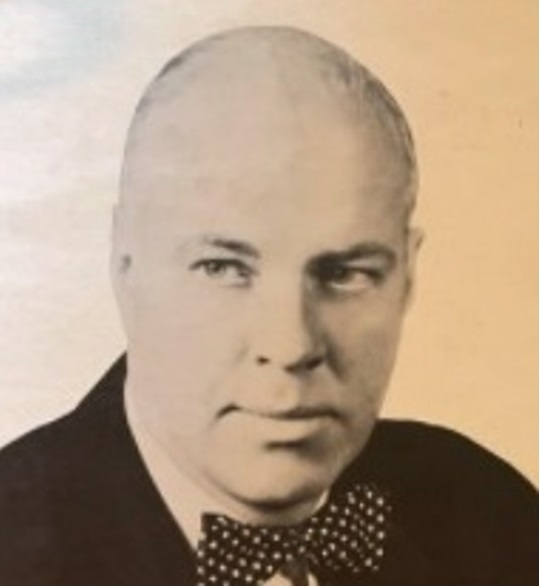

Nominee	Harold W. Handley	Ralph Tucker
Party	Republican	Democratic
Popular vote	1,086,868	859,393
Percentage	55.61%	43.98%
- County results Handley: 50–60% 60–70% 70–80% Tucker: 40–50% 50–60%
Governor before election
George N. Craig
Republican
Elected Governor
Harold W. Handley
Republican

The 1956 Indiana gubernatorial election was held on November 6, 1956. Republican nominee Harold W. Handley defeated Democratic nominee Ralph Tucker with 55.61% of the vote.

== General election ==
=== Candidates ===
Major party candidates

- Harold W. Handley, Republican, Lieutenant Governor under George N. Craig
- Ralph Tucker, Democratic, Mayor of Terre Haute

Other candidates

- J. Ralston Miller, Prohibition
- Merle N. Miller, Socialist Labor

=== Results ===
1956 Indiana gubernatorial election
Party	Candidate	Votes	%	±%
Republican	Harold W. Handley	1,086,868	55.61%	
Democratic	Ralph Tucker	859,393	43.98%	
Prohibition	J. Ralston Miller	6,791	0.35%	
Socialist Labor	Merle N. Miller	1,238	0.06%	
Majority		227,475		
Turnout		1,954,290		
Republican hold		Swing		
