= 16th Indiana Infantry Regiment =

16th Regiment Indiana Infantry
- Active: May 27, 1862 – June 30, 1865
- Country: United States
- Allegiance: Union
- Branch: Infantry & Mounted infantry
- Engagements: Battle of Ball's Bluff; Battle of Richmond; Yazoo Pass Expedition; Battle of Chickasaw Bayou; Battle of Arkansas Post; Battle of Port Gibson; Battle of Champion Hill; Battle of Big Black River Bridge; Siege of Vicksburg, May 19 & May 22 assaults Bayou Teche Campaign; Red River Campaign; Battle of Sabine Crossroads

The 16th Regiment Indiana Infantry was an infantry regiment in the Union Army during the American Civil War. In August 1863, the regiment was converted to mounted infantry for the remainder of the war.

== Service ==
The 16th Indiana Infantry was organized at Indianapolis, Indiana and initially served on a one-year enlistment from May 27, 1861, through August 19, 1862, and mustered again on August 19, 1862, for three years' service under the command of Colonel Thomas J. Lucas.

The regiment was attached to Manson's Brigade, Army of Kentucky. Captured and reorganized after the battle of Richmond, it was attached to 1st Brigade, 10th Division, Right Wing, XIII Corps, Department of the Tennessee, to December 1862. 1st Brigade, 1st Division, Sherman's Yazoo Expedition to January 1863. 1st Brigade, 10th Division, XIII Corps, Army of the Tennessee, to July 1863. 1st Brigade, 4th Division, XIII Corps, Department of the Tennessee, to August 1863, and Department of the Gulf to September 1863. Unattached Cavalry Division, Department of the Gulf, to November 1863. 1st Brigade, Cavalry Division, Department of the Gulf, to June 1864. 4th Brigade, Cavalry Division, Department of the Gulf, to August 1864. District of LaFourche, Department of the Gulf, to June 1865.

The 16th Indiana Infantry mustered out of service after June 30, 1865. Veterans and recruits were transferred to the 13th Indiana Cavalry.

== Detailed service ==
The regiment moved to Louisville, Kentucky, on August 19, and subsequently to Richmond, Kentucky. At the Battle of Richmond on August 30, the regiment was captured but was paroled and sent to Indianapolis. They were exchanged on November 1, 1862, and ordered to Memphis, Tennessee, on November 20.

From December 20, 1862, to January 3, 1863, they participated in Sherman's Yazoo Expedition. During this period, they took part in the expedition to the Texas and Shreveport Railroad on December 25–26, and fought at Chickasaw Bayou from December 26 to 28. They also engaged at Chickasaw Bluff on December 29.

Between January 3 and 10, 1863, the regiment took part in the expedition to Arkansas Post, Arkansas, culminating in the assault and capture of Fort Hindman at Arkansas Post on January 10–11. Following this, they moved to Young's Point, Louisiana, from January 17 to 21, remaining on duty there and at Milliken's Bend until April.

From February 14 to 29, they participated in an expedition to Greenville, Mississippi, and Cypress Bend, Arkansas, including action at Cypress Bend on February 19 and at Fish Lake near Greenville on February 23. They then moved on to the movement on Bruinsburg, Mississippi, and the approach to Grand Gulf from April 25 to 30, leading up to the Battle of Port Gibson on May 1.

They fought at the Battle of Champion Hill on May 16 and at the Big Black River on May 17. The regiment endured the lengthy Siege of Vicksburg from May 18 to July 4, participating in assaults on May 19 and 22. Afterward, they advanced on Jackson, Mississippi, from July 4 to 10, and participated in the siege of Jackson from July 10 to 17. They remained on duty at Vicksburg until August 24, when they were ordered to New Orleans.

In New Orleans, the regiment was mounted and assigned to duty along the eastern shore of the Mississippi, protecting transportation to New Orleans and along the coast until October. During this period, they engaged in expeditions to the New and Amite Rivers from September 24–29, and participated in the Western Louisiana "Teche" Campaign from October 3 to November 30. Notable actions included engagements at Grand Coteau on November 3, Vermillionville on November 8, and Camp Piatt on November 20.

They were ordered back to New Orleans to refit, and on February 22, 1864, fought at Franklin. From March 10 to May 22, they took part in the Red River Campaign, moving from Franklin to Alexandria between March 14 and 26, with engagements at Bayou Rapides on March 20, Henderson's Hill on March 21, and at Monett's Ferry and Cloutiersville on March 29–30. They fought at Crump's Hill on April 2, and near Pleasant Hill on April 7–9, including the Battle of Sabine Cross Roads on April 8 and the engagement at Grand Ecore on April 16. They moved to Natchitoches on April 22, then about Cloutiersville from April 22–24, and crossed Cane River on April 23. They reached Alexandria on April 28, and fought at Hudnot's Plantation on May 1, remaining there until May 8. After a retreat to Morganza from May 13–20, they participated in actions at Wilson's Landing on May 14, Avoyelle's Prairie on May 15, Mansure on May 16, and finally reached Morganza on May 28.

Following this, they were ordered to report to General Cameron and assigned to frontier and patrol duty in the District of Lafourche, Department of the Gulf, until June 1865. Notable actions during this period included an engagement at Berwick on August 27, 1864, and expeditions to various locations such as Natchez Bayou (August 30–September 2), near Gentilly's Plantation on September 1, and to Grand Lake, Grand River, Lake Fosse Point, Bayou Pigeon, and Lake Natchez from September 7–11, including actions at Labadieville on September 8 and Bayou Corn on September 9.

In late 1864 and early 1865, the regiment participated in expeditions from Terre Bonne to Bayou Grand Caillou (November 19–27), from Morganza to Morgan's Ferry and Archafalaya River (December 13–14), and from Brashear City to the Amite River (February 10–13, 1865). They also conducted an expedition to Grand Glaze and Bayou Goula (February 14–18), scouting to Bayou Goula (March 23–24), and engaged in skirmishes at Grand Bayou on April 4 and at Brown's Plantation on May 11. Additional operations included expeditions to Bayou Goula from April 19–25 and actions about Brashear City on April 21–22.

== Casualties ==
The regiment lost a total of 297 men; 3 officers and 82 enlisted men killed or mortally wounded, 212 enlisted men due to disease.

== Commanders ==
- Colonel Pleasant A. Hackleman
- Colonel Thomas J. Lucas
- Lieutenant Colonel John M. Orr - commanded at the battle of Arkansas Post; wounded in action
- Major James H. Redfield - commanded at the battle of Arkansas Post and during the siege of Vicksburg

== Notable members ==
- Brevet Colonel Oran D. Perry: Indiana Adjutant General from 1905 to 1909.

== See also ==
- List of Indiana Civil War regiments
- Indiana in the Civil War
