= 69th Indiana Infantry Regiment =

69th Regiment Indiana Infantry
- Active: August 19, 1862 – July 5, 1865
- Country: United States
- Allegiance: Union
- Branch: Infantry
- Engagements: Battle of Richmond; Yazoo Pass Expedition; Battle of Chickasaw Bayou; Battle of Arkansas Post; Battle of Port Gibson; Battle of Champion Hill; Battle of Big Black River Bridge; Siege of Vicksburg, May 19 & May 22 assaults Bayou Teche Campaign; Texas Campaign, November 1863 to April 1864; Red River Campaign; Battle of Fort Blakeley

The 69th Regiment Indiana Infantry was an infantry regiment that served in the Union Army during the American Civil War.

== Service ==
The 69th Indiana Infantry was organized at Richmond, Indiana, and mustered in for a three-year enlistment on August 19, 1862, under the command of Colonel Thomas W. Bennett.

The regiment was attached to Manson's Brigade, Army of Kentucky, Department of the Ohio. Attached to 1st Brigade, 9th Division, Right Wing, XIII Corps, Department of the Tennessee, to December 1862. 1st Brigade, 3rd Division, Sherman's Yazoo Expedition, to January 1863. 1st Brigade, 9th Division, XIII Corps, Army of the Tennessee, to July 1863. 3rd Brigade, 1st Division, XIII Corps, Army of the Tennessee, to August 1863, and Department of the Gulf to March 1864. 2nd Brigade, 1st Division, XIII Corps, to June 1864. 2nd Brigade, 3rd Division, XIX Corps, Department of the Gulf, to December 1864. District of Southern Alabama, Department of the Gulf, December 1864. 3rd Brigade, Reserve Corps, Military Division West Mississippi, to February 1865. 2nd Brigade, 2nd Division, Reserve Corps, Military Division West Mississippi, February, 1865. 2nd Brigade, 2nd Division, XIII Corps, Military Division West Mississippi, to July 1865.

The 69th Indiana Infantry mustered out of service July 5, 1865.

== Detailed service ==
- Left Indiana for Lexington, Kentucky, August 20.
- Battle of Richmond, August 30.
  - Regiment captured August 30; paroled and sent to Indianapolis.
- Reorganized at Indianapolis until November 27, 1862.
  - Left Indiana for Memphis, Tennessee, November 27, 1862.
- Sherman's Yazoo Expedition December 20, 1862 to January 3, 1863.
  - Chickasaw Bayou December 26–28.
  - Chickasaw Bluff December 29.
- Expedition to Arkansas Post, Arkansas, January 3–10, 1863.
- Assault and capture of Fort Hindman, Arkansas Post, January 10–11.
- Moved to Young's Point, Louisiana, January 17, and duty there until March 8.
- Moved to Milliken's Bend, Louisiana, March 8, and duty there until April 25.
- Roundaway Bayou, Richmond, March 31.
- Operations from Milliken's Bend to New Carthage March 31-April 17.
  - James' Plantation, near New Carthage, April 6.
- Movement on Bruinsburg, Mississippi and turning Grand Gulf April 25–30.
- Battle of Port Gibson May 1.
- Battle of Champion Hill May 16.
- Big Black Bridge May 17.
- Siege of Vicksburg May 18-July 4.
  - Assaults on Vicksburg May 19 and 22.
- Advance on Jackson, Mississippi, July 4–10.
  - Near Clinton July 8.
  - Near Jackson July 9.
- Siege of Jackson July 10–17.
- Moved to New Orleans, Louisiana, August 13.
- Duty at Carrollton, Brashear City, and Berwick until October.
- Western Louisiana "Teche" Campaign October 3-November 30.
- Ordered to Algiers December 13, then moved to Texas December 18.
- Duty at Matagorda Bay and Indianola until February 1864, and at Matagorda Island until April 19.
- Moved to New Orleans, then to Alexandria, Louisiana, April 19–27.
- Red River Campaign April 27-May 22.
  - Actions at Alexandria April 29 and May 2 to 9.
  - Graham's Plantation May 5.
  - Retreat to Morganza May 13–20.
- Duty at Morganza until December.
  - Expedition to the Atchafalaya May 30-June 6.
  - Expedition to mouth of White River and St. Charles, Arkansas, September 13–20.
- Moved to Dauphin Island, Mobile Bay, December 7.
- Granger's Pascagoula Expedition December 14, 1864, to January 1, 1865.
- Duty at Pascagoula until January 31.
  - Consolidated to a battalion of four companies January 22.
- Moved to Barrancas, Florida, January 31; then to Pensacola, Florida, March 14.
- Steele's march through Florida to Mobile March 20-April 1.
  - Occupation of Pollard March 26.
- Siege of Spanish Fort and Fort Blakely April 1–9.
  - Assault and capture of Fort Blakely April 9.
- March to Montgomery and Selma April 13–22.
- Return to Mobile May 3 and duty there until July.

== Drownings at Matagorda Bay ==
A tragedy of mass drownings involving the 69th Indiana occurred at Matagorda Bay, Texas, during preparations for the evacuation of Texas. The regiment was ordered to assemble at Matagorda Island on the Gulf Coast of Texas in preparation for the Red River Campaign in Louisiana To move from their base at Indianola on Matagorda Bay to Matagorda Island, it was necessary to cross McHenry Bayou, now known as Saluria Bayou, a 300-yard stretch of the bay using a ferry made up of pontoon boats tied together in a raft. The raft could carry about three companies at a time.

On Sunday afternoon, March 13, 1864, the regiment began to cross McHenry Bayou. On the raft's third trip, while carrying companies B, G, and K together with their camp followers, the raft was swamped by a swift incoming tide. Two officers and 21 enlisted men drowned from the 69th Indiana as well as additional troops, most of these additional deaths were from the 2nd Regiment Engineers, Corps d' Afrique, with many others carried over a mile away before they could be rescued.

== Casualties ==
The regiment lost a total of 331 men during service; 3 officers and 77 enlisted men killed or mortally wounded, 3 officers and 248 enlisted men died of disease.

== Commanders ==
- Colonel Thomas Warren Bennett
- Lieutenant Colonel Harman J. Korff - commanded at the battle of Richmond

== Notable members ==
- Colonel Thomas Warren Bennett - governor of Idaho Territory, 1871–1875; Congressional delegate from Idaho Territory, March 4, 1875, to June 23, 1876; Indiana State Senator
- Oran D. Perry: Indiana Adjutant General from 1905 to 1909.

== See also ==
- 69th Indiana Infantry drownings
- List of Indiana Civil War regiments
- Indiana in the Civil War
