= Governor Whitcomb =

Governor Whitcomb may refer to:

- Edgar Whitcomb (1917–2016), 43rd Governor of Indiana
- James Whitcomb (1795–1852), 8th Governor of Indiana
