= 1960 Indiana gubernatorial election =

- November 8, 1960
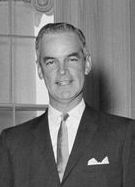

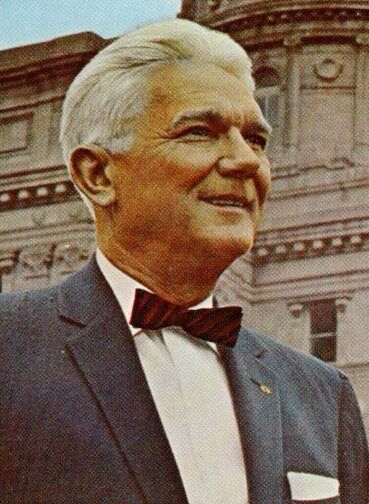
Nominee	Matthew E. Welsh	Crawford F. Parker
Party	Democratic	Republican
Popular vote	1,072,717	1,049,540
Percentage	50.39%	49.30%
- County results Welsh: 50–60% 60–70% Parker: 40–50% 50–60% 60–70%
Governor before election
Harold W. Handley
Republican
Elected Governor
Matthew E. Welsh
Democratic

The 1960 Indiana gubernatorial election was held on November 8, 1960. Democratic nominee Matthew E. Welsh defeated Republican nominee Crawford F. Parker with 50.39% of the vote.

== General election ==
=== Candidates ===
Major party candidates

- Matthew E. Welsh, Democratic, State Senator
- Crawford F. Parker, Republican, Lieutenant Governor under Harold W. Handley

Other candidates

- J. Ralston Miller, Prohibition
- Herman Kronewitter, Socialist Labor

=== Results ===
1960 Indiana gubernatorial election
Party	Candidate	Votes	%	±%
Democratic	Matthew E. Welsh	1,072,717	50.39%	
Republican	Crawford F. Parker	1,049,540	49.30%	
Prohibition	J. Ralston Miller	5,892	0.28%	
Socialist Labor	Herman Kronewitter	816	0.04%	
Majority		23,177		
Turnout		2,128,965		
Democratic gain from Republican		Swing		
