= 1964 Indiana gubernatorial election =

- November 3, 1964
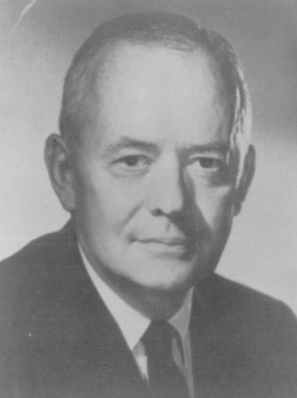

| Nominee | Roger D. Branigin | Richard O. Ristine |
| Party | Democratic | Republican |
| Popular vote | 1,164,620 | 901,342 |
| Percentage | 56.18% | 43.48% |
- County results Branigin: 40–50% 50–60% 60–70% Ristine: 40–50% 50–60%
Governor before election
Matthew E. Welsh
Democratic
Elected Governor
Roger D. Branigin
Democratic

The 1964 Indiana gubernatorial election was held on November 3, 1964.

Incumbent Democratic Governor Matthew E. Welsh was term-limited.

Democratic nominee Roger D. Branigin defeated Republican nominee Richard O. Ristine with 56.18% of the vote. This would be the last time until 1988 in which the Democrats won the governorship.

As of 2023, this marks the most recent time that Democrats won the races for governor and for president concurrently.

== Nominations ==
Until 1976, all nominations for statewide office in Indiana were made by state conventions.

=== Democratic nomination ===
==== Candidates ====
- Roger D. Branigin, former president of the Indiana State Bar Association
- Clinton Green, executive secretary of the Indiana Port Commission
- Marshall F. Kizer, Indiana Senate minority leader

==== Results ====
The Democratic convention was held on June 12, 1964.

Democratic convention results
| Party | Candidate | Votes | % |
|---|---|---|---|
| Democratic | Roger D. Branigin | 1,449 | 65.60 |
| Democratic | Marshall F. Kizer | 594 | 26.89 |
| Democratic | Clinton Green | 133 | 6.02 |
| Democratic | Scattering | 33 | 1.49 |
| Total votes | | 2,209 | 100.00 |

=== Republican primary ===
==== Candidates ====
- William G. Bray, incumbent U.S. Representative for Indiana's 7th congressional district
- G. Richard Ellis, former State Senator
- Robert E. Gates, Indiana's 4th congressional district Republican chairman
- Robert E. Hughes, incumbent Indiana State Treasurer
- Earl F. Landgrebe, State Senator
- Charles O. Hendricks, incumbent Secretary of State of Indiana
- Richard O. Ristine, incumbent Lieutenant Governor of Indiana

==== Results ====
The Republican convention was held on June 9, 1964.

Republican convention results
| Party | Candidate | Votes | % |
|---|---|---|---|
| Republican | Richard O. Ristine | 1,212 | 55.29 |
| Republican | Robert E. Hughes | 599 | 27.33 |
| Republican | William G. Bray | 266 | 12.14 |
| Republican | G. Richard Ellis | 70 | 3.19 |
| Republican | Robert E. Gates | 29 | 1.33 |
| Republican | Charles O. Hendricks | 15 | 0.68 |
| Republican | Earl F. Landgrebe | 1 | 0.05 |
| Total votes | | 2,192 | 100.00 |

== General election ==
=== Candidates ===
- Chester G. Bohannon, Prohibition
- Gordon A. Long, Socialist Labor, candidate for the U.S. Senate in 1956
- Roger D. Branigin, Democratic
- Richard O. Ristine, Republican

=== Results ===
1964 Indiana gubernatorial election
| Party | Candidate | Votes | % | ±% |
|---|---|---|---|---|
| Democratic | Roger D. Branigin | 1,164,620 | 56.18% | |
| Republican | Richard O. Ristine | 901,342 | 43.48% | |
| Prohibition | Chester G. Bohannon | 5,771 | 0.28% | |
| Socialist Labor | Gordon A. Long | 1,182 | 0.06% | |
| Majority | | 263,278 | 12.70% | |
| Turnout | | 2,072,915 | 100.00% | |
| Democratic hold | | Swing | | |

== Bibliography ==
- Gubernatorial Elections, 1787-1997. Washington, D.C.: Congressional Quarterly Inc. 1998. ISBN 1-56802-396-0.
- Scammon, Richard M., ed. (1966). America Votes 6: a handbook of contemporary American election statistics, 1964. Washington, D.C.: Governmental Affairs Institute.
