= General Cocke =

General Cocke may refer to:

- Erle Cocke Jr. (1921–2000), U.S. Army brigadier general
- John Alexander Cocke (1772–1854), Tennessee Militia major general in the War of 1812
- John Hartwell Cocke (1780–1866), Virginia Militia brigadier general in the War of 1812
- Philip St. George Cocke (1809–1861), Confederate States Army brigadier general
