= Elmer Sherwood =

Elmer W. Sherwood
- Governor: Ralph F. Gates
- Preceded by: William P. Weimer
- Succeeded by: Ben H. Watt

Indiana House of Representatives
- In office 1921–1922

Indiana Adjutant General
- In office 1945–1945

Personal details
- Born: 1896 Linton, Indiana
- Died: 1979 (aged 82–83)
- Party: Republican
- Education: Indiana University

Military service
- Allegiance: United States
- Branch/service: United States Army
- Battles/wars: World War I

Elmer W. Sherwood was an Indiana politician and state adjutant general for the Indiana National Guard in 1945.

Sherwood was born in 1896 at Linton, Indiana. He majored in English at Indiana University until the United States joined World War I. Sherwood enlisted and was assigned to the 150th Field Artillery Regiment. That September, the regiment departed Fort Harrison for Europe as part of the 42nd Infantry Division (United States), crossing the Atlantic on the USS President Lincoln. Sherwood kept a diary during World War I, which was first published in 1922 under the title Rainbow Hoosier.

After the war, Sherwood returned to Indiana University to finish his degree. While still a student, he was elected to the Indiana House of Representatives. He graduated in 1921, and married Lucile Smith in 1925. During his career, he served as an English teacher at Linton High School, and was elected clerk of Greene County, Indiana. In the late 1930s, he was named editor of the National Legionnaire, the magazine of the American Legion.

During World War II, Sherwood was appointed as the director of public relations at Fort Benjamin Harrison. In 1945, Straub was sworn in as the 42nd Adjutant General of the Indiana National Guard. He also served as an advisor to Indiana Governor George N. Craig, and served 3 months in prison for his role in the Toll Road scandal.

Upon his release, Sherwood moved to Florida. He remained in the Army Reserves and retired as a Brigadier general. He died in 1979.
