= Indiana Adjutant General =

Adjutant General of Indiana
- Incumbent; Lawrence M. Muennich since January 13, 2025; 1 year, 9 months and 28 days
- Term length: 4 years

The Adjutant General of Indiana is the commander of the Indiana National Guard, the Indiana Guard Reserve, and, when active, the Indiana Naval Militia. The Adjutant General (or 'TAG') is responsible for all state, non-federalized military and reports directly to the Governor of Indiana. Indiana's TAG is appointed by the governor and serves a term concurrent with the governor. The Adjutant General must hold a rank of Brigadier General (BG) or higher.

There have been 56 men who served as Adjutant General in Indiana; 3 have served nonconsecutive terms, bringing the total number of terms to 59.

== List of Adjutants General of Indiana ==
The following have served as Adjutants General in Indiana:

#	Image	Name	From Date	Appointed by (Governor)	Served until
60		BG Lawrence M. Muennich	13 January 2025	Mike Braun (2025)	Present
59		MG R. Dale Lyles	1 October 2019	Eric Holcomb (2019)	13 January 2025
		BG Timothy Winslow (Interim)	9 August 2019	Eric Holcomb (2019)	1 October 2019
58		BG Courtney P. Carr	1 June 2015	Mike Pence (2015)	9 August 2019
57		MG Roy Martin Umbarger	11 March 2004	Joe Kernan (2004) Mitch Daniels (2004); Mike Pence (2012)	31 May 2015
56		MG George A. Buskirk	5 November 2002	Frank O'Bannon (2001)	11 March 2004
55		MG Robert J. Mitchell	1997	Frank O'Bannon (1997)	5 November 2002
54		MG Charles W. Whitaker	21 April 1990	Evan Bayh	1997
53		MG Jack K. Elrod	1989	Evan Bayh	1990
52		MG Carl G. Farrell	1986	Robert D. Orr	1989
51		MG Alfred F. Ahner	1972	Edgar Whitcomb; Otis Bowen; Robert D. Orr	1986
50		John M. Owens	1969		1972
49		John S. Anderson	1961		1969
48		Alfred F. Ahner	1960	Harold W. Handley	1961
47		John W. McConnell	1957		1960
46		Harold H. Doherty	1953		1957
45		Robinson Hitchcock	1949	Henry F. Schricker	1953
44		Howard H. Maxwell	1947		1949
43		Ben H. Watt	1945		1947
42		Elmer W. Sherwood	1945	Ralph F. Gates	1945
41		William P. Weimer	1942	Henry F. Schricker	1945
40		Elmer F. Straub	1941	Henry F. Schricker	1942
39		James D. Friday	1941	Henry F. Schricker	1941
38		Elmer F. Straub	1933	Paul V. McNutt, M. Clifford Townsend	1941
37		Paul E. Tombaugh	1931	Harry G. Leslie	1933
36		Manford G. Henley	1929		1931
35		BG William G. Everson	1929	Harry G. Leslie (1929)	
34		William H. Kershner	1925		1929
33		Harry B. Smith	1917		1925
32		Franklin L. Bridges	1914		1917
31		George W. McCoy	1909		1913
30		Oran D. Perry	1905		1909
29		John R. Ward	1901	Winfield T. Durbin	1905
28		James K. Gore	1897	James A. Mount	1901
27		Irwin Robbins	1893		1897
26		Nicholas R. Ruckle	1889		1893
25		George W. Koontz	1885	Isaac P. Gray	1889
24		James R. Carnahan	17 January 1881	Albert G. Porter	1885
23		George W. Russ	13 February 1877	James D. Williams	1881
22		William W. Conner	1873	Thomas A. Hendricks	1877
21		John G. Greenwalt	1 April 1870	Conrad Baker	1873
20		MG James C. Veatch	1869	Conrad Baker	1870
19		BG William Henry Harrison Terrell	1864	Oliver P. Morton (1864)	1869
18		Lazarus Noble	1861	Oliver P. Morton	1864
17		John M. Wallace	1861	Oliver P. Morton	1861
16		Lew Wallace	1861	Oliver P. Morton	1861
15		William A. Morrison	1857	Ashbel P. Willard	1861
14		Stephen Tomlinson	1854	Joseph A. Wright	1857
13		GEN David Reynolds	6 January 1844	James Whitcomb	1854
12		Douglas Maguire	1838	David Wallace	1843
11		Jacob Landis	1832	Noah Noble	1838 (Note: Dates in source appear to be errors. Need new reference to verify dates.)
10		Thomas Posey (Note: This is not the Indiana Territory Governor Thomas Posey, who died in 1818.)	1823	William Hendricks	1831
9		Stephen Ranney	1822		1823
8		Henry Coburn	1819	Jonathan Jennings	1822
7		Stephen Ranney	1817	Jonathan Jennings	1819

The following Adjutants General served in Indiana Territory:

#	Name	From Date	Appointed by (Governor)	Served until
6	COL Allen B. Thorn	17 September 1814	Thomas Posey	1817 Statehood
5	COL Walter Taylor	24 February 1814	Thomas Posey	17 September 1814
4	COL W. Johnson	10 September 1813	Thomas Posey	24 February 1814
2	COL Daniel Sullivan	14 January 1813	John Gibson	10 September 1813
3	COL Charles Smith	21 October 1812	William Henry Harrison	1813
2	COL Daniel Sullivan	12 July 1812	William Henry Harrison	1812
1	John Small	1801	William Henry Harrison	1812

== Citations and References ==
Notes

Citations

References

- Pratt, William D. (1901). A History of the National Guard of Indiana. Indianapolis, IN: William D. Pratt.
- Lowry, Jeff (Summer 2015). "Hoosier Adjutants General". Indiana Guardsman. Indiana National Guard. p. 14.
