= Robert L. Rock =

American politician (1927–2013)

30th Mayor of Anderson, Indiana
- In office 1972–1980
- Preceded by: J. Ed Flanagan
- Succeeded by: Thomas R. McMahan

42nd Lieutenant Governor of Indiana
- In office January 11, 1965 – January 13, 1969
- Governor: Roger D. Branigin
- Preceded by: Richard O. Ristine
- Succeeded by: Richard E. Folz

Member of the Indiana House of Representatives from Madison County
- In office November 5, 1958 – November 4, 1964
- Preceded by: Multi-member district
- Succeeded by: Multi-member district
- In office November 3, 1954 – November 7, 1956
- Preceded by: Multi-member district
- Succeeded by: Multi-member district

Personal details
- Born: September 8, 1927 Alexandria, Indiana, U.S.
- Died: January 9, 2013 (aged 85) Fort Lauderdale, Florida, U.S.
- Party: Democratic
- Spouse: Mary Jo Ferguson (m. 1956)
- Children: Four
- Education: Indiana University
- Occupation: Politician

Robert Lee Rock (September 8, 1927 – January 9, 2013) was an American politician who served as the Lieutenant Governor of Indiana from 1965 to 1969 and as the Mayor of Anderson, Indiana, from 1972 to 1980. He was the Democratic nominee for Governor of Indiana in 1968, but lost to Republican Edgar Whitcomb.

== Early life ==
Born in Alexandria, Indiana, Rock grew up in Anderson, Indiana, where he graduated from Anderson High School in 1945. Shortly after starting college at Indiana University, he reported for duty in the United States Navy in October 1945 and became a hospital corpsman at Balboa Naval Hospital in San Diego, California. After serving in the navy, he went back to college and graduated from Indiana University School of Business in Bloomington with a degree in business in 1951.

== Political career ==
In 1954, at the age of 26, Rock was elected to the Indiana House of Representatives as a Democrat serving in the 1955, 1959, 1961, and 1963 sessions. Then he served as Lieutenant Governor of Indiana from 1965 to 1969. In 1968, Rock won the Democratic nomination for Governor of Indiana, but lost the general election to Republican Secretary of State Edgar Whitcomb. He later served as Mayor of Anderson, Indiana from 1972 to 1980, where he established the Anderson Housing Authority Commission and the City of Anderson Transportation System (CATS).

== Personal life ==
In 1956, he married Mary Jo Ferguson with whom he had four children and later eight grandchildren.

== Death ==
Rock died in Fort Lauderdale, Florida, on January 9, 2013, at the age of 85.

Party political offices
Preceded by Roger D. Branigin	Democratic nominee for Governor of Indiana; 1968	Succeeded by Matthew E. Welsh
Political offices
Preceded by Richard O. Ristine	Lieutenant Governor of Indiana; 1965 – 1969	Succeeded by Richard E. Folz
