= Thomas John Lucas =

American soldier (1826–1908)

Thomas J. Lucas
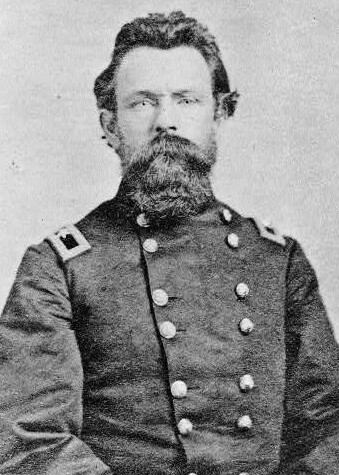
- Born: September 9, 1826; Lawrenceburg, Indiana, U.S.
- Died: November 17, 1908 (aged 83); Lawrenceburg, Indiana, U.S.
- Military career
- Allegiance: United States
- Branch: U.S. Army; Union Army
- Rank: Brigadier General; Brevet Major General
- Conflicts: Mexican–American War; American Civil War; Battle of Ball's Bluff; Vicksburg Campaign; Mobile Campaign (1865)

Thomas John Lucas (1826–1908) was an American officer in the Mexican–American War and the American Civil War.

== Life ==
Thomas John Lucas was born in Lawrenceburg, Indiana, on September 9, 1826. He was a son of one Major Frederick J. Lucas, who apparently fought under Napoleon.

in 1847, he left his father's adopted trade of watchmaker and fought in the Mexican War as a 2nd lieutenant of the 4th Indiana Volunteers for a period of 14 months.

In 1861 he joined the Union Army as lieutenant colonel of the 16th Indiana Infantry Regiment. A year later he became Colonel, and led his unit through the Vicksburg Campaign. From late 1863 onwards he commanded various cavalry brigades in the west and south, mostly serving in the Department of the Gulf. He was promoted to Brigadier General in late 1864, continued to command cavalry brigades and divisions, and eventually was brevetted Major General for his services at Mobile. He mustered out in January 1866.

He died at Lawrenceburg, Indiana on November 17, 1908, aged 83 years. His wife died several months before him.

== See also ==
- List of American Civil War generals (Union)

== Sources ==
- Warner, Ezra J. (1964). Generals in Blue: Lives of the Union Commanders. Baton Rouge: Louisiana State University Press. pp. 82, 285–287.
- Eicher, John H. and David J. (2001). Civil War High Commands. Stanford, CA: Stanford University Press. ISBN 0-8047-3641-3.
