= List of mayors of Anderson, Indiana =

This is a list of mayors of Anderson, Indiana:

| # | Name | Term start | Term end | Party |
|---|---|---|---|---|
| 1 | Robert N. Williams | 1865 | 1866 | Republican |
| 2 | John C. Jones | 1866 | 1867 | Democratic |
| 3 | Wesley Durham (1st) | 1868 | 1869 | Democratic |
| 4 | Simeon C. Martindale | 1870 | 1871 | Democratic |
| 5 | William Roach | 1872 | 1873 | Democratic |
| 6 | William L. Brown | 1874 | 1875 | Temperance |
| 7 | Byron H. Dyson | 1876 | 1877 | Democratic |
| 8 | James Hazlett | 1878 | 1881 | Republican |
| 9 | Wesley Dunham (2nd) | 1882 | 1885 | Democratic |
| 10 | John F. McClure | 1886 | 1889 | Republican |
| 11 | John H. Terhune (1st) | 1890 | 1893 | Republican |
| 12 | Morey M. Dunlap | 1894 | 1901 | Republican |
| 13 | John L. Forkner | 1902 | 1905 | Democratic |
| 14 | John H. Terhune (2nd) | 1906 | 1909 | Republican |
| 15 | Henry P. Hardie | 1909 | 1909 | Republican |
| 16 | Frank A. Foster | 1910 | 1913 | Democratic |
| 17 | Jesse H. Mellett (1st) | 1914 | 1917 | Democratic |
| 18 | William J. Black | 1918 | 1921 | Democratic |
| 19 | Blanchard J. Horne | 1922 | 1925 | Republican |
| 20 | Andrew J. Jones | 1925 | 1925 | Republican |
| 21 | Francis M. Williams | 1926 | 1929 | Republican |
| 22 | Jesse H. Mellett (2nd) | 1930 | 1933 | Democratic |
| 23 | Harry R. Baldwin | 1933 | 1942 | Democratic |
| 24 | Clarence D. Rotruck | 1943 | 1947 | Republican |
| 25 | G. Lester McDonald | 1948 | 1951 | Democratic |
| 26 | Noland C. Wright | 1952 | 1955 | Republican |
| 27 | Ralph R. Ferguson | 1956 | 1963 | Democratic |
| 28 | Frank H. Allis | 1964 | 1967 | Republican |
| 29 | J. Ed Flanagan | 1968 | 1971 | Republican |
| 30 | Robert L. Rock | 1972 | 1980 | Democratic |
| 31 | Thomas R. McMahan | 1980 | 1987 | Republican |
| 32 | J. Mark Lawler | 1987 | 2004 | Democratic |
| 33 | Kevin S. Smith (1st) | 2004 | 2008 | Republican |
| 34 | Kris Ockomon | 2008 | 2012 | Democratic |
| 35 | Kevin S. Smith (2nd) | 2012 | 2016 | Republican |
| 36 | Thomas Broderick Jr. (born in 1952; age 72–73) | January 1, 2016 | Present | Democratic |
