= Ralph Tucker =

American mayor (1906–1977)

Ralph Tucker (September 30, 1906 – November 21, 1977) was the longest-serving mayor of Terre Haute, Indiana, serving from 1948 to 1968.

== Biography ==
One of nine children, Ralph Tucker was born in Hymera, Indiana. Tucker's father died when the young Ralph was three years old. His mother, left to support nine children alone, placed Ralph in an orphanage, where he would live until he was nearly ten years old. He would later live with an older sister.

When Tucker reached adulthood, he moved to Chicago, where he became a salesman and met the woman who would become his wife, Virginia. They were wed in 1936. Also that year, the young couple moved back to Terre Haute, where Tucker worked for radio station WBOW.

In 1938, Tucker was elected city clerk, but he served only one term in this first elected office. He was defeated in the 1942 election, but his political career was far from over.

When the popular mayor of Terre Haute, sporting goods dealer Vernon R. McMillan, declined to seek re-election in 1947, Tucker threw his hat into the ring, narrowly escaping in the Democratic primary, but once past that obstacle, he won handily in the general election.

Controversy swirled at times throughout his 20-year reign as the city's mayor. Unemployment ballooned and the city's reputation took hits from inside and outside the state, some saying the city's old, early-1900s nickname of "Sin City" still stuck. Regardless, Terre Haute's citizenry re-elected Tucker in 1951, 1955, 1959 and 1963.

It could have been different, though, had 1956 not been an overwhelmingly Republican year for political victory. Against the odds, Tucker was chosen as the Democratic candidate for Indiana governor in the 1956 election, but he lost in a landslide to the sitting Republican lieutenant governor, Harold Handley. Like many Republicans that year, Handley rode into office on the coattails of President Dwight D. Eisenhower, who easily won a second term in that election.

In 1967, Tucker decided not to seek a sixth term as mayor. He left office at the beginning of 1968 and started his own public relations firm. Later, he became president of the Terre Haute Area Chamber of Commerce.

Ralph Tucker died after a long battle with cancer at the age of 71, on November 21, 1977. His funeral was the second of a prominent Terre Haute resident in the span of a month; Indianapolis Motor Speedway and Hulman & Co. owner Tony Hulman had died some three weeks earlier.

Party political offices
Preceded by John A. Watkins	Democratic nominee for Governor of Indiana; 1956	Succeeded by Matthew E. Welsh
