= Roger D. Branigin =

American politician

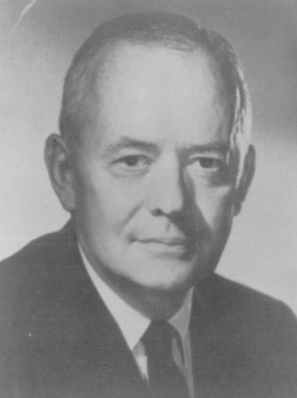

42nd Governor of Indiana
- In office January 11, 1965 – January 13, 1969
- Lieutenant: Robert L. Rock
- Preceded by: Matthew E. Welsh
- Succeeded by: Edgar Whitcomb

Personal details
- Born: Roger Douglas Branigin; July 26, 1902 Franklin, Indiana, U.S.
- Died: November 19, 1975 (aged 73) Lafayette, Indiana, U.S.
- Resting place: Greenlawn Cemetery, Franklin, Indiana
- Party: Democratic
- Spouse: Josephine Mardis (m. 1929)
- Children: 2
- Education: Franklin College, Harvard University Law School

Military service
- Branch/service: United States Army
- Years of service: 1941–1945
- Battles/wars: Judge Advocate General

Roger Douglas Branigin (July 26, 1902 – November 19, 1975) was an American politician who was the 42nd governor of Indiana, serving from January 11, 1965, to January 13, 1969. A World War II veteran and well-known public speaker, Branigin took office with a Democratic general assembly, the first time since the Great Depression that Democrats controlled both the executive and legislative branches of the Indiana state government. Branigin was a conservative Democrat who oversaw repeal of the state's personal property taxes on household goods, increased access to higher education, and began construction of Indiana's deep-water port at Burns Harbor on Lake Michigan. During his one term as governor, Branigin exercised his veto power one hundred times, a record number for a single term. Branigin was the last Democrat to serve as governor of Indiana until Evan Bayh took office in 1989.

In 1968 Branigin received national attention when he ran as a stand-in for Lyndon B. Johnson in Indiana's Democratic presidential primary. Johnson dropped out of the race on March 31, 1968, but Branigin continued to run as a favorite son candidate against Robert F. Kennedy and Eugene McCarthy. Branigin hoped his efforts would gain a stronger role for Indiana at the 1968 Democratic convention in Chicago. Branigin finished second in the primary to Kennedy.

After his term as governor ended, Branigin returned to Lafayette, where he resumed a private law practice and remained active in civic life, serving as president of the Greater Lafayette Chamber of Commerce and the Harrison Trails Council of the Boy Scouts of America. Branigin also served as a trustee for Franklin College, Purdue University, and the Indiana Historical Society.

== Early life ==
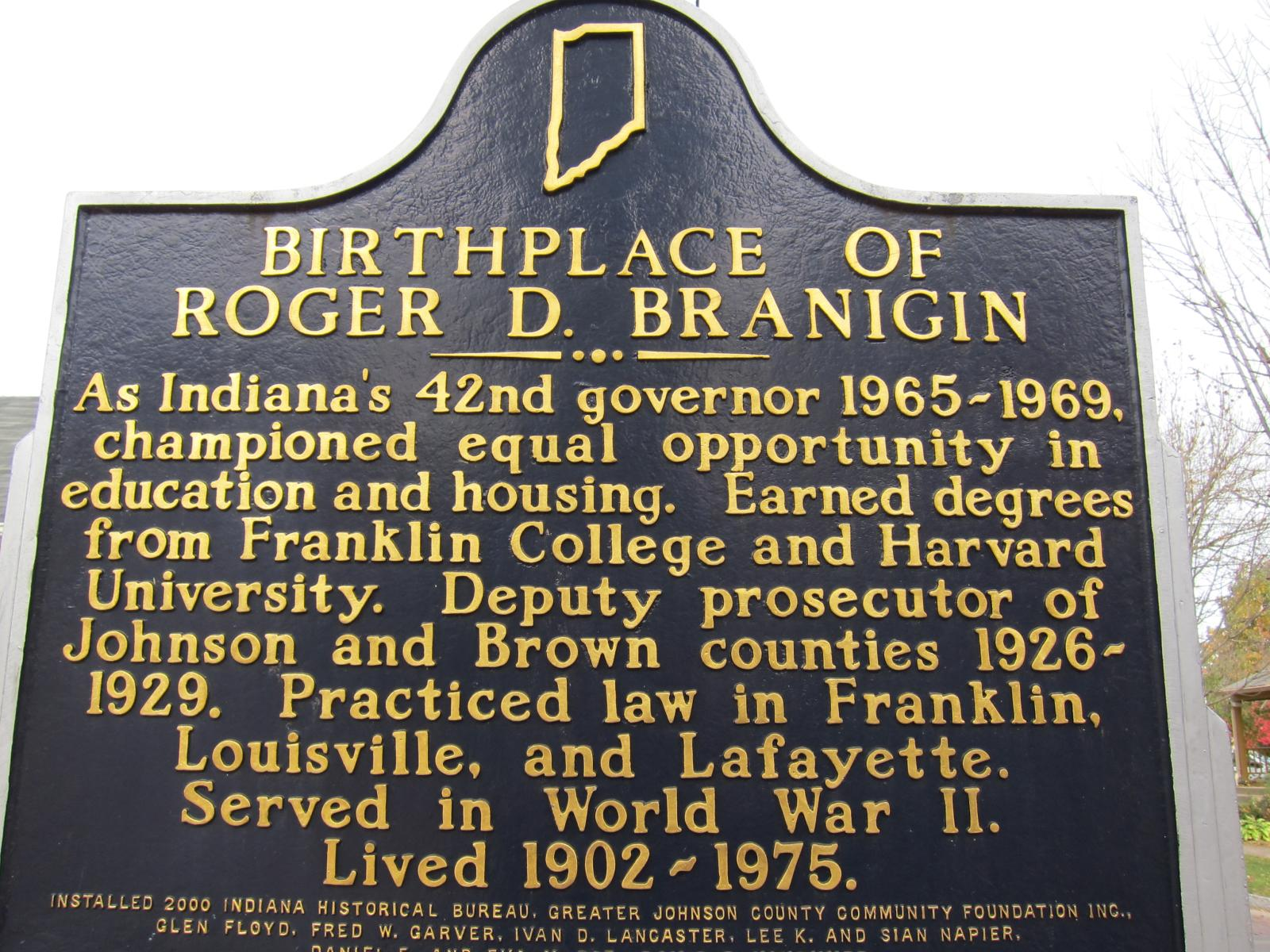
Sign marking Branigin's birthplace in Franklin

Branigin was born on July 26, 1902, in Franklin, Indiana. Branigin's father was a lawyer, teacher, and amateur historian. Branigin attended local public schools, graduating from high school in 1919, and went to nearby Franklin College, where he majored in Spanish, French, and history. Branigin was involved in the school's drama club as well. After graduating from Franklin in 1923, he enrolled at Harvard University Law School, where he earned a law degree in 1926. Branigin returned to Indiana and took a job with the Johnson County prosecutor's office, and remained there for three years. On November 2, 1929, Branigin married fellow Franklin College graduate Josephine Mardis. The couple had two sons, Roger Jr. and Robert.

In 1930 Branigin took a job as attorney for the Federal Land Bank and the Farm Credit Administration in Louisville, Kentucky. He was soon promoted to general counsel for the bank and traveled a five-state region giving speeches. He retired from the bank in 1938 to join a law firm in Lafayette, Indiana. Branigin became a partner in the Stuart, Branigin, Ricks, and Schilling law firm. At the outbreak of World War II, Branigin joined the U.S. Army and was assigned to the contract division of the Judge Advocate General's Office in Washington, D. C., where he became head of the legal division of the army's transportation corps with the rank of lieutenant colonel. After the war, Branigin returned to his Lafayette law practice.

== Political life ==
A longtime Democrat, Branigin was active in local and state politics. In 1948 he chaired the Democratic state convention. After Democratic gubernatorial candidate Henry F. Schricker won the election that year, he appointed Branigin as chairman of the state conservation commission. Branigin also served as president of the Indiana Bar Association. In 1956 Branigin entered the race for the Democratic gubernatorial nomination, but he was defeated by Ralph Tucker.

== Indiana governor ==
Portrait of Branigin.

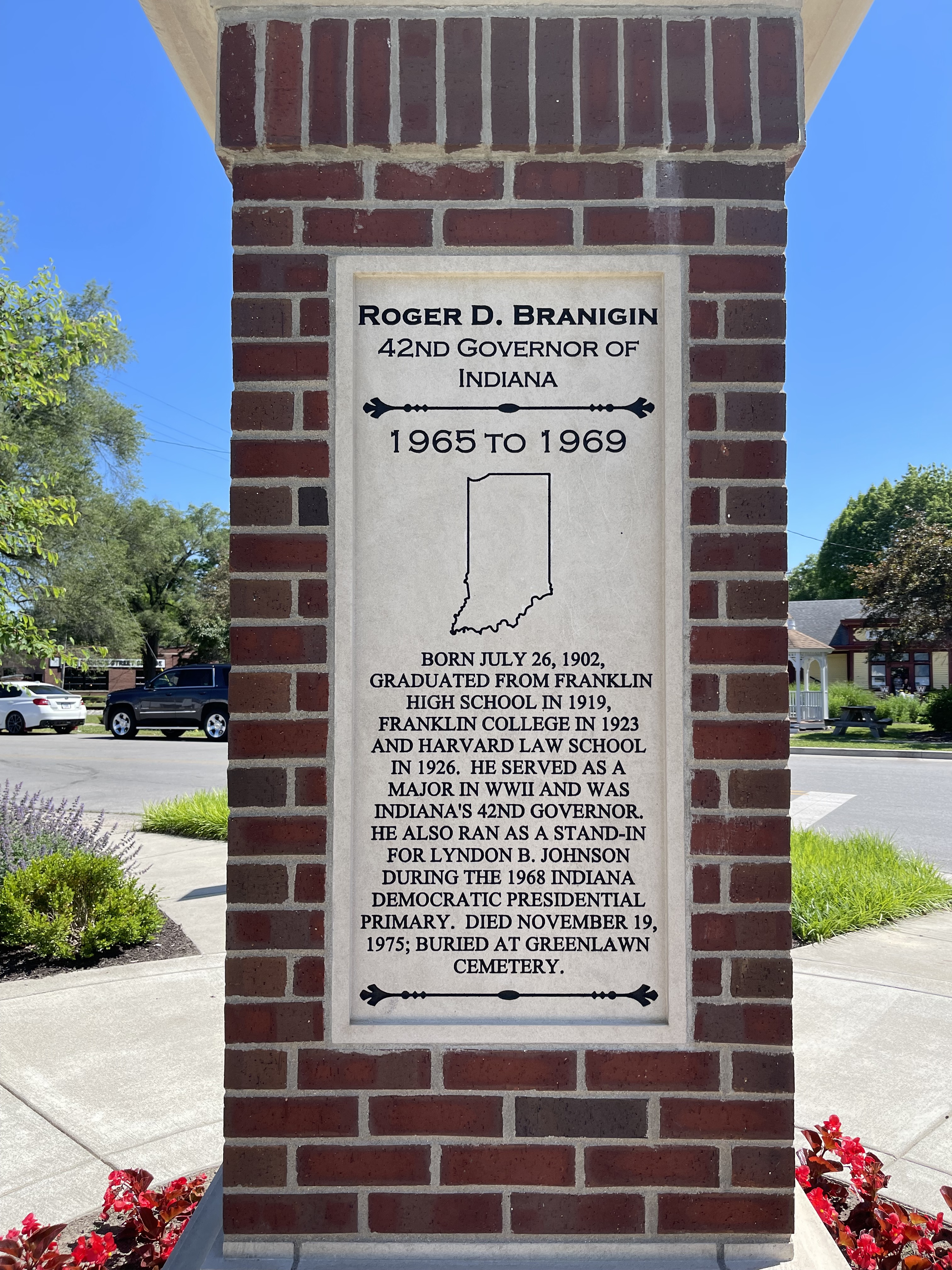
Memorial to Branigin in Franklin, Indiana.

At the Democratic state convention in June 1964, Branigin won the gubernatorial nomination on the first ballot. Branigin's Republican opponent, incumbent Lieutenant Governor Richard O. Ristine, had cast a tie-breaking vote in the Indiana Senate allowing a state sales tax, which was an unpopular decision among voters. During the campaign, Branigin attacked Ristine on his tax-raising record. In addition, Branigin earned an endorsement from the traditionally Republican Indianapolis Star and several other state newspapers, helping him win the election by the largest margin in state history at the time. His campaign song was an adaptation of the blues song Walk Right In. Democrats also took control of the Indiana General Assembly for the first time since 1938.

Once in office, Branigin proved to be more conservative than the leadership in the general assembly. He vetoed a record one hundred bills, including an abortion legalization bill, a ban on the death penalty, and union protection laws (although he did sign a bill repealing the 1957 right-to-work law). Despite his disagreement with the general assembly on a host of issues, Branigin had a number of his agenda items passed into law. He successfully advocated for state-funded scholarships for higher education, increased the state's civil rights commission's powers, upgraded the state prison system, expanded the state highway system, abolished the poll tax, and created a number of new public parks and nature preserves. During Branigin's term as governor, he also oversaw the repeal of the personal property tax and began work on the Port of Indiana, the state's first deep-water harbor on Lake Michigan.

== Presidential candidate ==
In early March 1968, President Lyndon Johnson asked Branigin to run as his stand-in during the Indiana Democratic presidential primary. Branigin agreed and campaigned earnestly as a Hoosier candidate representing Hoosiers. When Johnson announced he would drop out of the race on March 31, Branigin decided to continue his campaign, hoping to control the state's votes at the Democratic convention in Chicago later that summer. Despite a hard-fought campaign and early leads in the polls, Branigin lost the Indiana primary to Robert Kennedy. Branigin earned 238,700 votes compared to Kennedy's 328,118, but he came in ahead of third-place finisher Eugene McCarthy.

== Later life ==
After leaving politics Branigin once again returned to his Lafayette law practice. In later years he served as president of the Greater Lafayette Chamber of Commerce, the Harrison Trails Council of the Boy Scouts of America, and a board member of Franklin College and Purdue University. During his lifetime Branigin amassed a large collection of books, which he later donated to the Franklin College library. Branigin also served as a member of the Indiana Historical Society board of trustees from 1965 to his death. Branigin died in Lafayette on November 19, 1975, and is buried in Greenlawn Cemetery in his hometown of Franklin, Indiana. During the 1990s, the Branigin Bridge, a state highway bridge in Tippecanoe County, Indiana, was named in his honor.

== See also ==
- List of governors of Indiana

== Notes ==
Party political offices
| Preceded by Matthew E. Welsh | Democratic nominee for Governor of Indiana; 1964 | Succeeded by Robert L. Rock |
Political offices
| Preceded by Matthew E. Welsh | Governor of Indiana; January 11, 1965 – January 13, 1969 | Succeeded by Edgar Whitcomb |
