= William N. Salin =

American attorney, banker and politician (1931–2019)

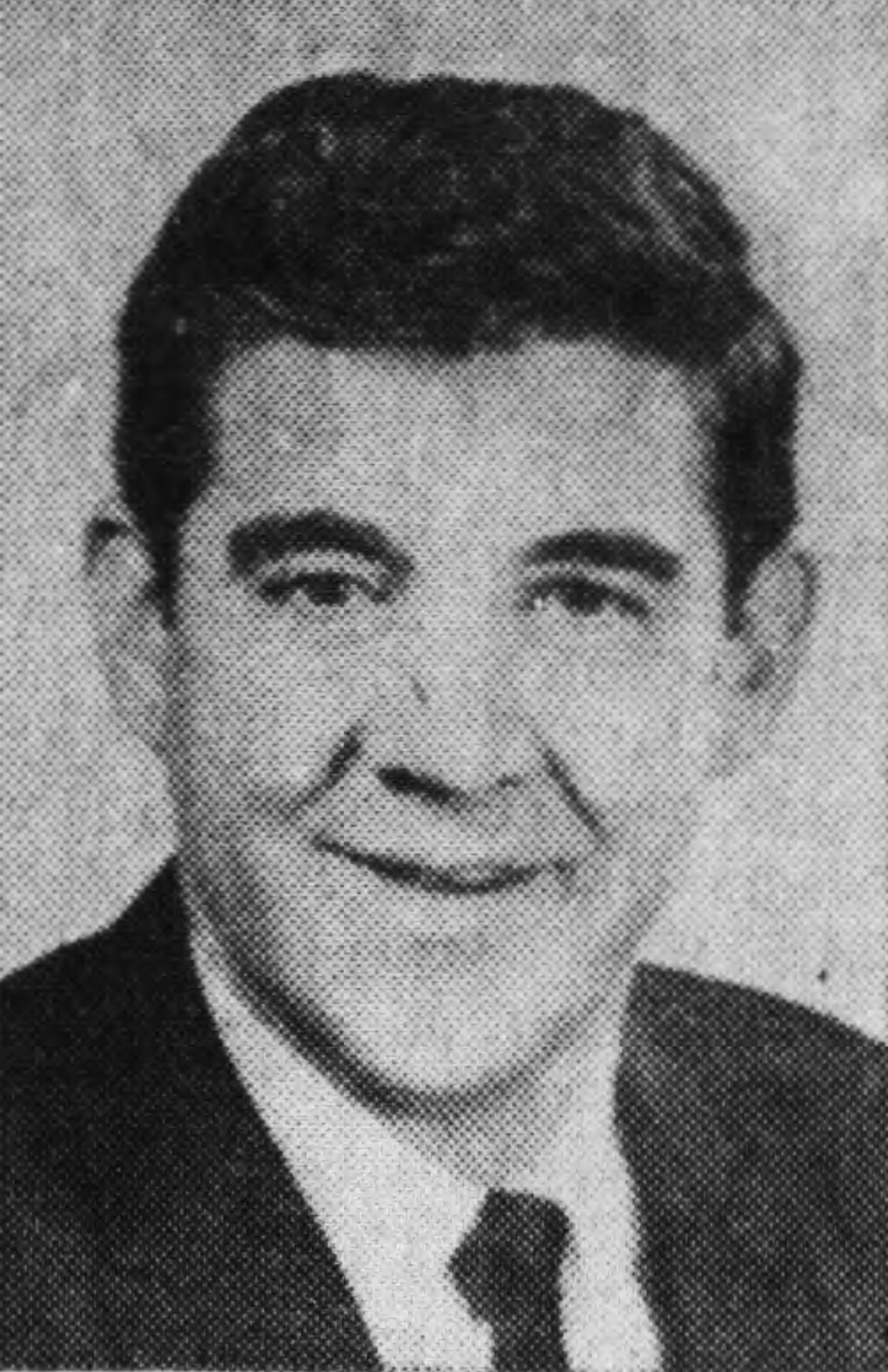
- Salin circa 1968

Secretary of State of Indiana
- In office December 1, 1968 – December 1, 1970
- Governor: Edgar Whitcomb
- Preceded by: Edgar Whitcomb
- Succeeded by: Larry Conrad

Personal details
- Born: October 23, 1931 Anderson, Indiana, US
- Died: May 4, 2019 (aged 87) Indianapolis, Indiana, US
- Party: Republican Party
- Education: Indiana University Bloomington
- Occupation: Attorney, Banker
- Awards: Sagamore of the Wabash

William Nathan Salin (October 23, 1931 – May 4, 2019) was an American attorney, banker, and politician who served as the 53rd secretary of state of Indiana.

== Early life and education ==
William Salin was born on October 23, 1931, and raised in Anderson, Indiana. He graduated from Indiana University School of Business in 1954, thereafter joining the United States Army. Salin later received a Juris Doctor from the Indiana University School of Law in Bloomington.

== Career ==
Early in his career, Salin worked as an associate at the law firm Findlay & Findlay in Kendallville, Indiana, and later served as Kendallville's city attorney. After moving to Fort Wayne, Indiana in 1962, Salin went to work for Indiana Bank.

From 1968 to 1970, Salin served a single term as Indiana Secretary of State. Though he had been uninvolved in politics up to that point, he was tapped by Indiana Republican Party bosses to fill the position as the party's nominee on the 1968 election ballot. Indiana's constitutional officers at that time were informally selected through backroom dealing by the party bosses of the state's largest counties, with party leaders from Allen County, Indiana being awarded the right to pick the Secretary of State in 1968. Mark Souder explains that, "According to legend, [party boss] Orvas [Beers] and his key allies, including city chairman Allan McMahan, were sitting in his living room debating over the alternatives. Bill Salin was out mowing his lawn and one of them said, 'Hey, what about Bill?'"

As Secretary of State, Salin aggressively campaigned against pyramid schemes and oversaw the purge of tens of thousands of inactive corporations from the Indiana corporations registry. A centrist, Salin was described in a 1970 article in the Anderson Herald as "at odds" with the conservative faction of the Indiana Republican Party and warned the party against "a swing to the right". He lost reelection in 1970 to Larry Conrad.

In 1972, Salin campaigned for the U.S. House of Representatives from Indiana's 4th congressional district. He failed to secure the Republican nomination and did not advance to the general election.

Returning to private life, Salin became a partner at the Fort Wayne law firm of Kennerk, Dumas, Burke, Backs & Salin. In 1983, he founded Salin Bank & Trust Company.

== Personal life ==
Salin was twice decorated with the Sagamore of the Wabash. He served on the boards of directors of the Indiana Historical Society and the Indiana Symphony Orchestra. Salin was a member of the United Methodist Church and, according to the Indianapolis Star, was a "voracious reader of the Bible". He established an endowed scholarship at Anderson University for the children of ministers, and led a capital campaign to finance the construction of a sanctuary at St. Luke's United Methodist Church.

Salin was married and, with his wife, had three children. He died on May 4, 2019, of complications from Parkinson's disease.

== Electoral history ==
1970 Indiana general election (Secretary of State)
Party	Candidate	Votes	%
Democratic	Larry Conrad	859,655	50.77
Republican	William N. Salin	833,517	49.23
Total votes		1,693,972	100.0

1968 Indiana general election (Secretary of State)
Party	Candidate	Votes	%
Republican	William N. Salin	1,073,160	53.76
Democratic	Stephen W. Crider	923,056	46.24
Total votes		1,996,216	100.0
