= Oran D. Perry =

American lawyer (1838–1929)

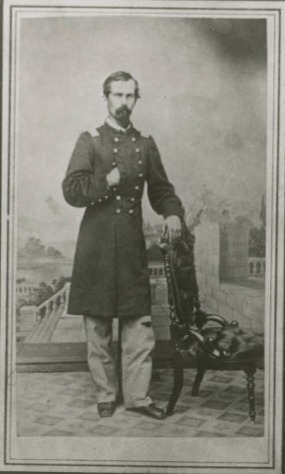
- Colonel Oran Perry c.1865

Indiana Adjutant General
- In office 1905–1909
- Governor: Winfield T. Durbin
- Preceded by: John R. Ward
- Succeeded by: George W. McCoy

Personal details
- Born: February 1, 1838 Liberty, Indiana
- Died: November 30, 1929 (aged 91) Indianapolis, Indiana
- Resting place: Earlham Cemetery; Richmond, Indiana
- Spouse: Mary Jane Poe

Military service
- Allegiance: United States of America
- Branch/service: (United States) Union Army
- Years of service: 1861–1865
- Rank: Lieutenant Colonel; Brevet Colonel
- Unit: 16th Indiana Infantry Regiment; 69th Indiana Infantry Regiment
- Battles/wars: American Civil War

Oran D. Perry (February 1, 1838 – November 30, 1929) was an Indiana lawyer, military officer, American Civil War veteran, businessman, and the Indiana Adjutant General from 1905 to 1909 under Governor of Indiana Winfield T. Durbin and Frank Hanly.

== Early life ==
Oran Perry was born on February 1, 1838, in Liberty, Indiana, as the son of James Perry and Elizabeth Snowden. In 1844 his family moved to Richmond, Indiana where he lived for much of his childhood. Perry's family were Quakers and he attended Quaker schools while growing up in Richmond.

== Military career ==
During the American Civil War Perry volunteered for service in the Union Army on April 23, 1861, as a private in Company B of the 16th Indiana Infantry Regiment. Perry was eventually appointed as the Sergeant Major of Company B and mustered out of service with the regiment on May 23, 1862. The regiment was present at the Battle of Ball's Bluff in October 1861.

On July 18, 1862, Perry reenlisted in the 69th Indiana Infantry Regiment and was appointed as the regiment's adjutant with the rank of First Lieutenant. The 69th Indiana was mainly recruited out of Winchester and Richmond, Indiana, along with Wayne County and Hancock County. Perry fought with the 69th Indiana at the Battle of Richmond where he was captured as a prisoner of war, but was later paroled.

Perry was eventually promoted to the rank of Lieutenant Colonel of the 69th Indiana on March 13, 1863, and fought in the following battles with the regiment; the Battle of Richmond, the Yazoo Pass Expedition, the Battle of Chickasaw Bayou, the Battle of Arkansas Post, the Battle of Port Gibson, the Battle of Champion Hill, the Battle of Big Black River Bridge, the Siege of Vicksburg, the Bayou Teche Campaign, the Red River Campaign, and the Battle of Fort Blakeley.

Near the end of the war Perry commanded the "residuary battalion" of the regiment which included just a couple of companies of the original regiment before it was mustered out of federal service on July 5, 1865. Perry received the brevet rank of Colonel when mustered out of federal service for gallant actions while serving with the regiment.

== Mining career ==
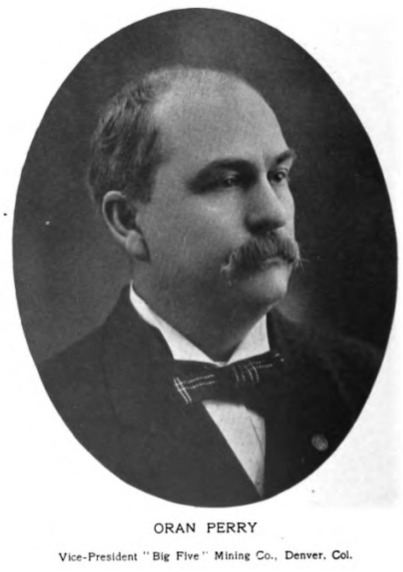
Big Five Mining Company Vice President Oran Perry c.1901

Perry was the Vice president of the "Big Five" Mining Company out of Denver, Colorado. The Big Five Company (also written as "Big 5") was a mining conglomerate originally founded by William P. Daniels of Rockport, Illinois and Nathan C. Merrill. The Big Five Company owned and operated a series of gold and silver mines which operated out of Frances, Idaho Springs, and Howardsville, Colorado, as well as the state of Sonora in Mexico.

== The Indiana Soldiers and Sailors Monument ==
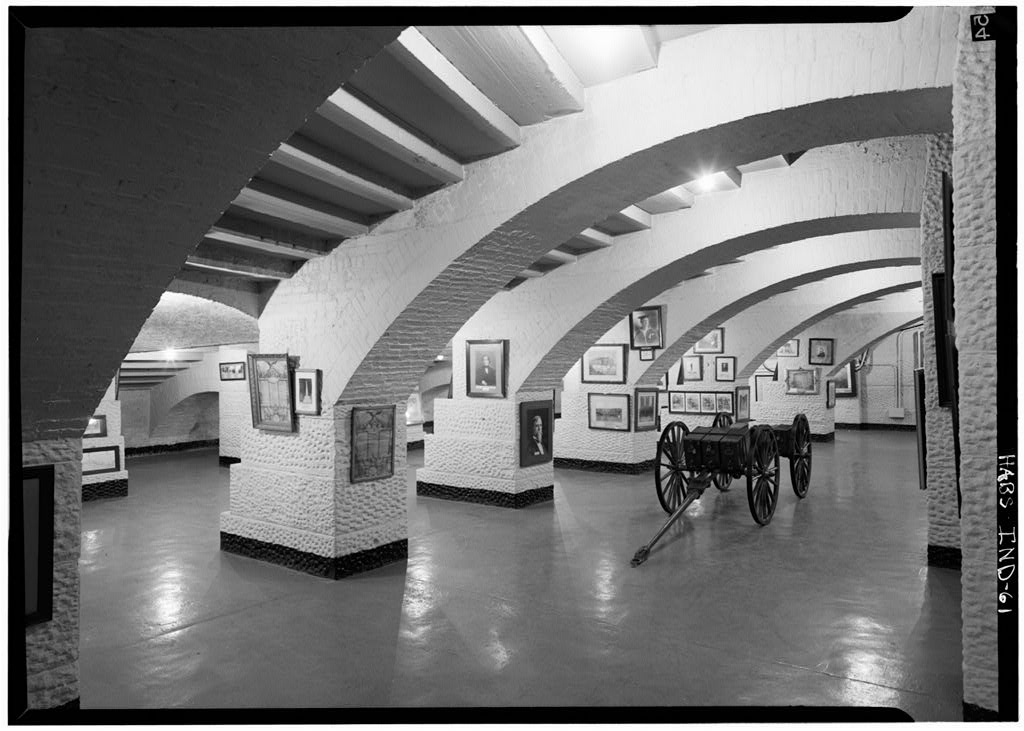
Interior of the Soldiers' and Sailors' Monument in August 1970.

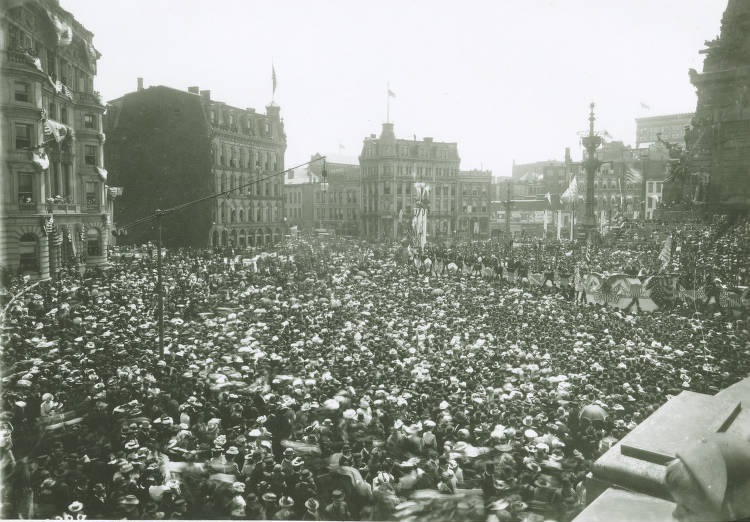
Monument Circle Dedication in Indianapolis on May 15, 1902.

Perry served as the first superintendent of the Soldiers' and Sailors' Monument in Indianapolis which was constructed from 1887 until 1902. In 1918 Perry created a gallery of military history in the lower level which eventually became the "Eli Lilly Museum" which was later owned by the Indiana War Memorial. During this time Perry also wrote several notable books pertinent to Indiana military history including his 1908 title Indiana in the Mexican War, which was a compiled report of Indiana volunteer regiment during the Mexican–American War. Perry would become the longest serving superintendent for the monument serving from 1919 until his death in 1929.

== Adjutant General ==
Starting in 1905 Perry was appointed as the Indiana Adjutant General under the Governor of Indiana Winfield T. Durbin, a fellow American Civil War veteran. Perry served as the Adjutant General for the state from 1905 to 1909.

== Personal life and death ==
Perry was married to Mary Jane Poe (1841–1936) on May 17, 1866, in Wayne County, Indiana. Perry died on Saturday November 30, 1929, in Indianapolis. He is buried at the Earlham Cemetery in Richmond.
