= Elmer Straub =

National Guard of the United States general

Elmer Frank Straub
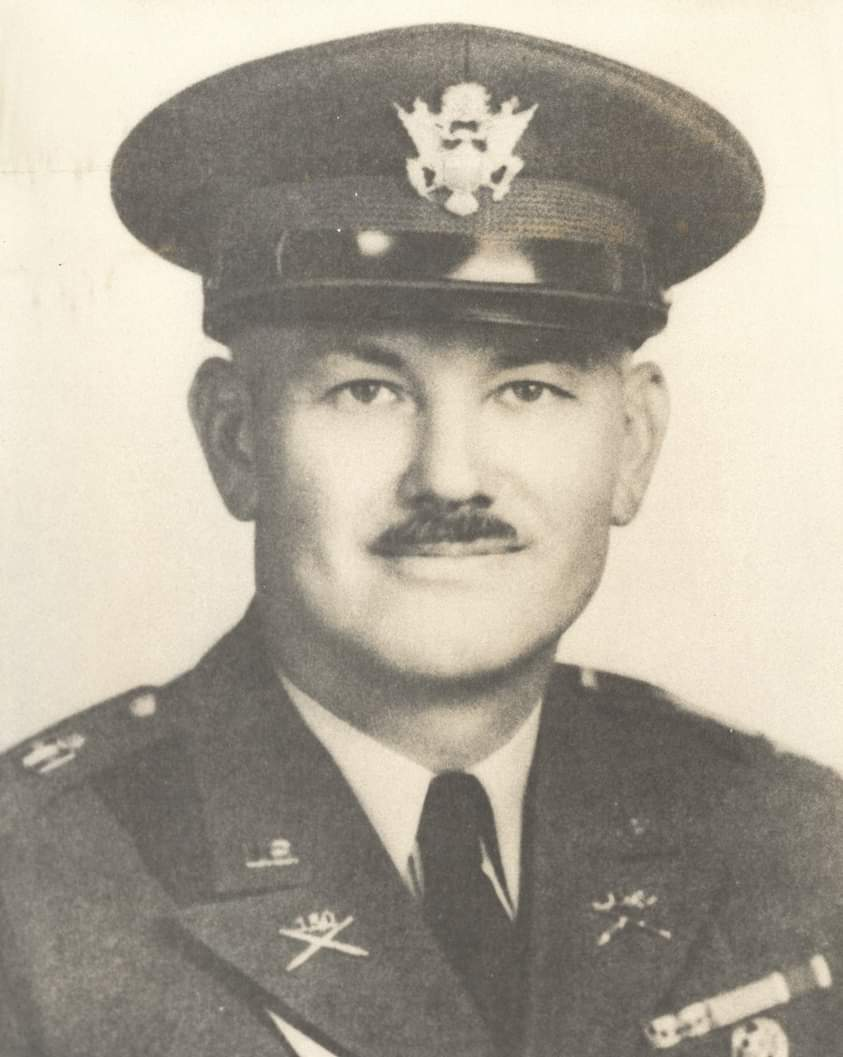

Adjutant General of Indiana
- In office 1933–1941
- Governor: Paul V. McNutt; M. Clifford Townsend
- Preceded by: William P. Weimer
- Succeeded by: James D. Friday
- In office 1941–1942
- Governor: Henry F. Schricker
- Preceded by: James D. Friday
- Succeeded by: Paul E. Tombaugh

Personal details
- Education: Indiana University

Military service
- Allegiance: United States
- Branch/service: United States Army
- Battles/wars: World War I

Elmer Frank Straub was a state adjutant general for Indiana from 1933 until 1941, and again from 1941 until 1942.

Straub attended Indiana University until 1917. That July, he enlisted at Fort Benjamin Harrison, and was assigned to Battery A, 150th Field Artillery Regiment. That September, the regiment departed Fort Harrison for Europe as part of the 42nd Infantry Division, and Straub was promoted to corporal. He kept a diary during World War I, which he later published as a book, which concluded with "I am free of the army now and I certainly hope that I ever shall be."

In 1933, Colonel Straub was sworn in as the 38th Adjutant General of the Indiana National Guard. He served in this position until 1941. He was succeeded by James D. Friday in 1941, but then returned as Adjutant General from 1941 to 1942, to aid in the mobilization of Indiana for World War II. He was called to active duty and served on General Eisenhower's staff during the war.

In 1948, The Netherlands accepted Straub into the Order of Orange-Nassau.
