= Erle Cocke Jr. =

United States Army general (1921–2000)

- Born: Egbert Erle Cocke, Jr. May 10, 1921; Dawson, Georgia, U.S.
- Died: April 23, 2000 (aged 78); Chevy Chase, Maryland, U.S.
- Resting place: Arlington National Cemetery; 38°52′45″N 77°04′20″W
- Education: University of Georgia; Harvard University
- Occupation: businessman
- Title: National Commander of The American Legion
- Term: 1949–1950
- Predecessor: George N. Craig
- Successor: Donald R. Wilson
- Political party: Democratic
- Spouse: Madelyn Grotnes
- Military service
- Allegiance: United States
- Branch: Georgia National Guard
- Rank: Brigadier General
- Wars: World War II
- Awards: Silver Star Medal; Bronze Star Medal (4); Purple Heart (4); French Croix de Guerre; Combat Infantryman Badge

Egbert Erle Cocke, Jr. (May 10, 1921 – April 23, 2000) was an American businessman and highly decorated World War II veteran who served as the 33rd National Commander of The American Legion from 1950 to 1951.

== Early life and education ==
A native of Dawson, Georgia, Cocke was the son of Egbert Erle and India Elise (née Meadows) Cocke. He graduated from the University of Georgia (A.B., class of 1942), where he was a member of the Phi Kappa Literary Society. In 1947, he received an M.B.A. from Harvard University. In later years Cocke received a total of three honorary doctorates from various universities.

== World War II ==
Cocke was commissioned in the United States Army in 1942 and served in World War II. Later in 1951, when President Harry S. Truman relieved General of the Army Douglas MacArthur of his duties during the Korean War, Cocke would voice his support of MacArthur. Awards received during World War II include the Silver Star, the Bronze Star Medal, Purple Heart with three oak leaf clusters, and Croix de Guerre of France.

== The American Legion ==
Cocke served as the 33rd National Commander of The American Legion from 1950 to 1951. At age 29, he became the youngest person to command the Legion, the U.S.' largest wartime veterans' organization.

== Career ==
Cocke was a banking consultant and lobbyist who did considerable work in business management and public relations. He co-founded Cocke & Phillips International Corporation, a banking consulting and lobbying firm founded in Washington, D.C. After serving as an aide to Secretary of State George Marshall and Secretary of Defense Robert A. Lovett, he was appointed a U.S. delegate to the United Nations General Assembly by President Dwight D. Eisenhower in 1959. Cocke held a position in the International Bank for Reconstruction and Development during the administrations of Presidents John F. Kennedy and Lyndon B. Johnson. In 1964 and 1966, Cocke ran unsuccessfully for the Democratic nomination for a seat in the United States House of Representatives to represent Georgia's 3rd congressional district.

== Personal life ==
Cocke married Madelyn Grotnes on May 28, 1955, in Chicago. She had been a private secretary to Senator Joseph McCarthy. The couple had three daughters – Elise Carol Cocke, Jennifer Aline Cocke (Mrs. Gregg Carpenter), and Carolyn Laurine Cocke (Mrs. Jeffrey M. Whitsett) – and a son (Egbert Erle Cocke, III), who died he died of cancer in Chevy Chase Maryland in 2000. Both Cocke and his wife Madelyn are buried in Arlington National Cemetery.

== See also ==
- List of Harvard University people
- List of people from Georgia (U.S. state)
- List of University of Georgia people

Non-profit organization positions
Preceded by George N. Craig	National Commander of The American Legion; 1950–1951	Succeeded by Donald R. Wilson
