= Matthew E. Welsh =

American politician (1912–1995)

41st Governor of Indiana
- In office January 9, 1961 – January 11, 1965
- Lieutenant: Richard O. Ristine
- Preceded by: Harold W. Handley
- Succeeded by: Roger D. Branigin

Member of the Indiana Senate from the Knox County and Daviess County district
- In office January 1952 – January 1960
- Preceded by: Clifford Farris
- Succeeded by: James Hamilton Beamon

United States Attorney for the Southern District of Indiana
- In office 1950–1952
- President: Harry Truman
- Preceded by: B. Howard Caughran
- Succeeded by: Marshall Hanley

Member of the Indiana House of Representatives from the Knox County district
- In office January 1940 – June 1942^{1}
- Preceded by: Charles Omer Free
- Succeeded by: Beecher Conrad

Personal details
- Born: Matthew Empson Welsh; September 15, 1912 Detroit, Michigan, U.S.
- Died: May 28, 1995 (aged 82) Indianapolis, Indiana, U.S.
- Resting place: Vincennes Memorial Park Cemetery
- Party: Democratic
- Spouse: Virginia Homann
- Children: 2
- Education: University of Pennsylvania (BS); University of Chicago (JD)
- Profession: Lawyer

Military service
- Branch/service: United States Navy
- Years of service: 1942–1946
- Battles/wars: World War II
- ^{1} Resigned from the House to enlist in the US Navy

Matthew Empson Welsh (September 15, 1912 – May 28, 1995) was an American politician who was the 41st governor of Indiana and a member of the Democratic Party, serving from 1961 to 1965. His term as governor saw a major increase in statewide taxation, including the first state sales tax, and the passage of several important civil rights bills, making Indiana one of the most friendly states to ethnic and religious minorities at that time. His tax hikes led to a near-tax revolt in the state, and people began writing "Indiana—Land of Taxes" on their license plates, at entry points into the state, in stores, and other public places. The situation killed any chance he had seeking higher office and earned him the moniker "Sales Tax Matt". Despite numerous reforms and his popularity within the Democratic Party, he was defeated when he ran for governor again in 1972. After leaving office, he served as chairman of the Indiana Democratic Party, as a member of the Democratic National Committee from 1964 until 1968, and as a federal commissioner on the International Joint Commission from 1966 until 1970. Throughout his life, Welsh was known for his personal motto, "It doesn't cost you anything to be a gentleman." After his retirement in 1972, he returned to Indianapolis, where he remained until his death in 1995.

== Early life ==
=== Family and background ===
Matthew Welsh was born on September 15, 1912, in Detroit, Michigan, the son of Matthew William and Inez Empson Welsh. Both of his parents were natives of Jackson County, Indiana and had only recently moved to Detroit where his father took a job as a secretary and legal counsel for an insurance company. He had three younger siblings, Mary, John and Margaret. At the outbreak of World War I, his father was hired as an industrial expediter by the federal government and began traveling often. Welsh and his mother moved to Brownstown, Indiana, where her parents lived. After the war ended, Welsh's father joined them in Brownstown, where he became the president of a local bank. In 1926, the family moved again to Vincennes, where Welsh's father took a new job as president of an investment firm.

Welsh's father had been active in local Democratic politics for many years, and from an early age, Welsh was also interested in politics. He attended public school in Vincennes and graduated from Lincoln High School in 1930. He enrolled in the Wharton School at the University of Pennsylvania, graduating in 1934. He enrolled in Indiana University School of Law the same year. While there, he coauthored an article with Law Professor (and future IU Dean) Frank Horack, describing Indiana's practice of enacting special legislation as a "twilight zone" of Indiana law. Welsh met Mary Virginia Homann while attending IU, and the couple began a relationship. After two years at IU, Welsh transferred to the University of Chicago Law School, where he graduated with a degree in law in 1937. The same year, he was married to Mary and the couple settled in Vincennes.

=== Politics and World War II ===
In Vincennes, Welsh opened a law practice and purchased a new home. He and his wife had twin daughters, Kathryn and Janet, in 1942. Welsh became involved in politics and ran for a seat in the Indiana House of Representatives and won in the 1940 election. He was re-elected to his seat in 1942, but resigned after the first session of the General Assembly to enlist in the navy, as World War II broke out. Welsh saw little action during the war and spend most of it on patrol of the American coastline. In 1946, he was discharged from the navy and returned home to resume practicing law. In 1950, President Harry Truman appointed him to serve as U.S. attorney for the Southern District of Indiana, a position he held until resigning in 1952 to return to his law practice.

Welsh had determined not to reenter politics but in 1954 he changed his mind and ran for the Indiana Senate, winning the election. As the General Assembly was dominated by the Republican Party at that time, Welsh had very little impact during his time as senator. In 1956, his name was entered as a candidate for governorship at the State Democratic Convention, but he was narrowly defeated in the vote by Ralph Tucker, the mayor of Terre Haute. In 1957, he became the minority leader in the state senate, a position he held until 1959.

== Governor ==
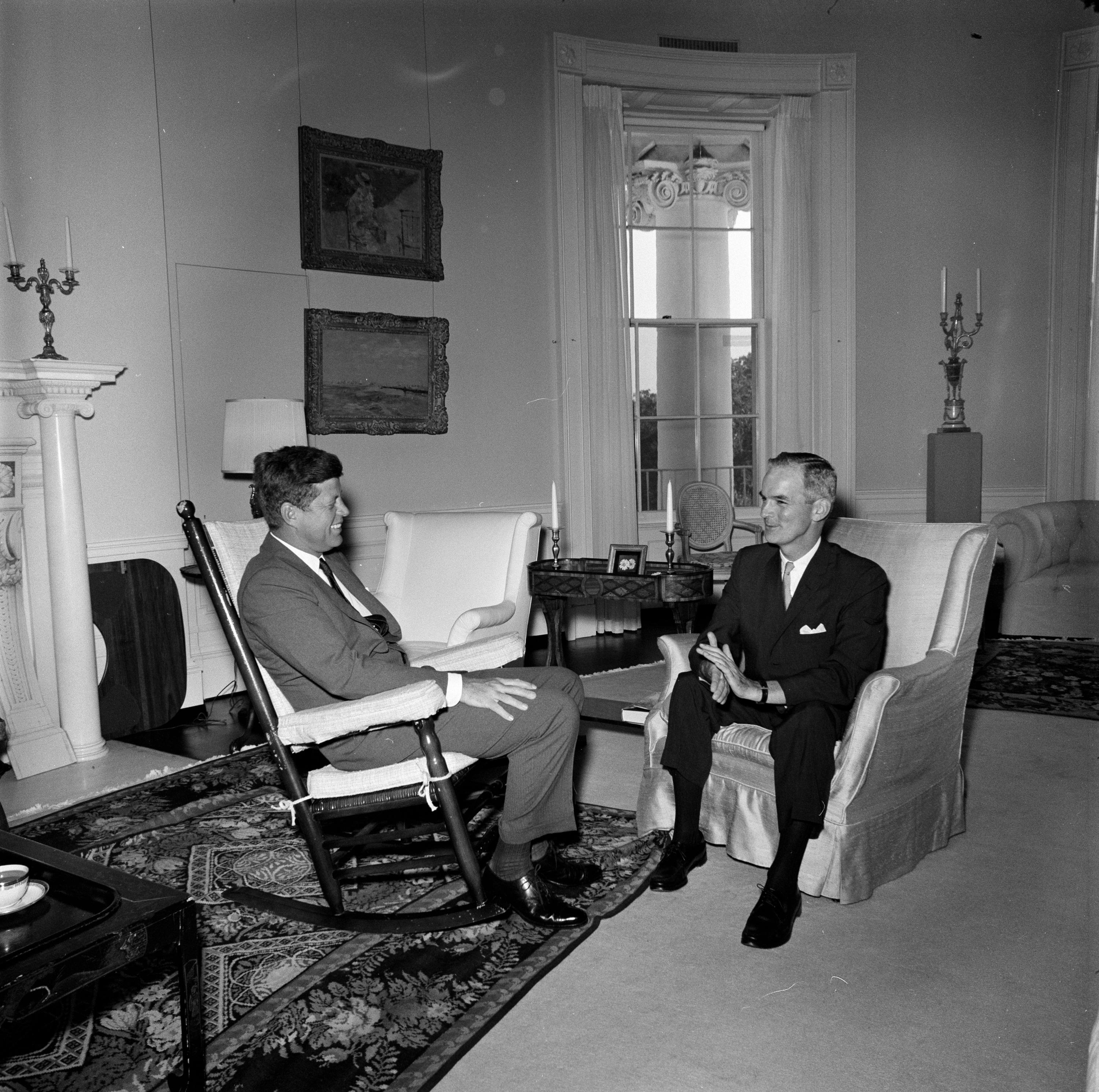
Welsh meeting with President John F. Kennedy in 1961

=== Election ===
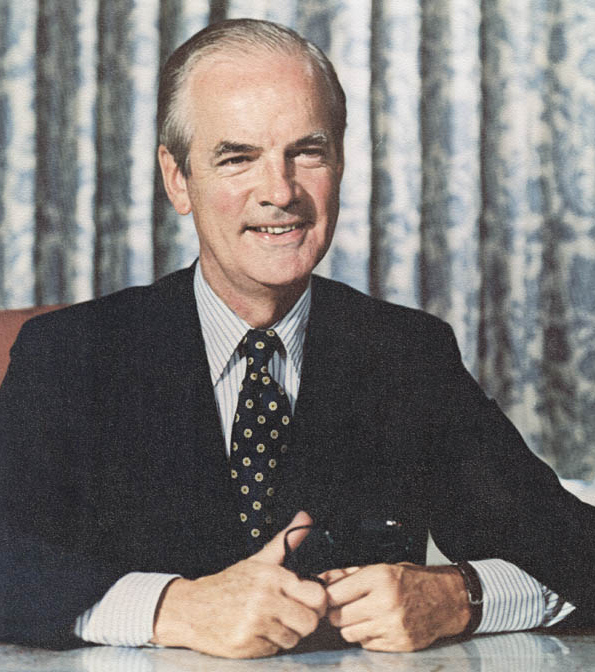
Welsh as governor.

Using the power of his new position, Welsh was able to maneuver himself into being a candidate for governor again at the 1960 state convention. This time his popularity had risen to such a height that he easily overcame his opposition to secure the nomination. In the general election, he faced Lieutenant Governor Crawford F. Parker, the Republican nominee. The campaign focused primarily on the looming budget deficit and secondarily on the civil rights issues being debated nationally. Although his party lost Indiana in the presidential election, Welsh won a narrow victory at the polls, winning by about 23,000 votes out of 2.1 million cast.

=== Tax increases ===
After taking office, Welsh was immediately confronted with the state's $18.2 million budget deficit. His predecessor, Harold Handley, had tackled the deficit with a combination of reforming the tax system, and an increase in the gasoline tax. The public, however, was not pleased with the tax increase and this was a factor in Handley's defeat for the United States Senate in 1958. Despite the previous public reaction, Welsh recommended an additional tax increase to cover the deficit. The Indiana General Assembly, however, was divided with Republican strongly controlling the House, and the Democrats with only a two-vote majority in the Senate. This created deadlock on most of Welsh's taxing measures. He was able to advocate the passage of the Property Tax Assessment Act of 1961 which improved the efficiency of the revenue department, gaining the government money in administrative savings, and reimposing a small state property tax; the state property taxes had only recently been repealed in the state. A second reform bill was passed creating the Division of Tax Review which had power to review and reassess property taxes statewide. The Division of Audit was also created, which for the first time which allowed the government to audit tax data and forcibly collect it and also begin cross-checking state tax returns with federal tax returns. Warrant officers were hired who, with the assistance of a local sheriff, could seize money and property to pay delinquent tax debts. This led to thousands of individuals statewide having their unpaid back taxes seized by the government. Despite all the activity, state revenue still fell short forcing the government to use its reserve funds; an even larger deficit was predicted for the 1958 tax year.

In the 1962 mid-term election Republicans strengthened their majority in the House and retook the Senate. To cajole them into action, Welsh submitted two budgets to them. One "balanced budget" made drastic cuts in education and state services. A second "budget of needs" continued adequate funding of the state government, and increased funding and spending in different areas, resulting in a $447 million difference between the two biennial budgets. The General Assembly discarded both of Welsh's budgets, claiming he was trying make the budget process political by giving the assembly two bad choices; they believed there was a better third option. They passed their own budget, which made a significant cut in spending but did not authorize any new taxation. Assembly leaders recommended using the reserve fund to cover the deficit until the national economy could recover.

After the General Assembly adjourned, Welsh launched a campaign advocating increased taxes. He argued that the state could not risk waiting on the economy to recover and that a long-term deficit would use the entire reserve fund and leave the state in a desperate condition. He advocated a plan of tax increases in every many area he called the "2-2-2 plan". It would impose a 2% sales tax for the first time in the state, raise the state income tax to 2% on net income for individuals, and 2% on the net income of corporations. Additionally, he advocated an increased tax on cigarettes to construct two new bridges in the state. After announcing his plan, he called a 38-day special session beginning March 12, 1963, of the General Assembly to consider and adopt his plan. After the House wrangled on the issue for two weeks, they passed the plan. In the Senate, the body had a tie vote in which the Republican lieutenant governor cast the break vote, passing the measure. The bill was largely unaltered from Welsh's original proposal, and named one of the new bridges in Welsh's honor, the Matthew E. Welsh Bridge.

Welsh, the lieutenant governor, and party leaders all paid a heavy political price for passing the massive tax increase, primarily because of the sales tax which was almost universally opposed by the public. Welsh's opponents labeled him "Sales Tax Matt" and a virtual statewide tax revolt ensued. Across the state the motto "Indiana—Land of Taxes" began to be displayed on car license plates, bumper stickers, placed on large billboards at entries into the state, in many businesses, and a number of other high-profile places.

=== Governmental reorganization ===
Welsh had an easier time persuading Republicans to make a number of reforms to state agencies and departments. The new Department of Administration, placed under the control of the Indiana Secretary of State, was created to streamline many state agencies. The state highway department was compelled reorganized, by replacing the commission that ran it with an executive director who was required to be a civil engineer, and replacing its patronage position with a merit system of hiring.

The Department of Mental Health was created to consolidate the management of the state's eight mental health hospitals under a single board of trustees. The board was also given oversight in a number of other areas including education for the mentally disabled, and the state alcoholic treatment center. The Department of Corrections was also signification altered to focus on rehabilitating prisoners. A new juvenile prison was built as a key feature of the new Rehabilitation Policy. The state's first art commission was created by an executive order in 1964 and was charged with promoting the arts in Indiana.

The consolidation of the state's education system, began in 1959, was accelerated and largely completed during Welsh's term. He aggressively pursued the consolidation agenda at the recommendation of his education adviser. By the time he left office, he had reduced the number of public schools in Indiana from 966 to 466. Welsh was also concerned with the lack of accessibility to higher education in the state and urged for the creation of a commission to investigate the problem and make recommendations to improve the situation. The General Assembly obliged, and the commission was created and recommended creating a state scholarship program, expanding Purdue and Indiana University to include satellite campuses around the state and to construct several new vocational schools. Welsh endorsed the plan, which the legislature implemented during his last year in office.

=== Civil rights ===
Throughout his term, Welsh was an outspoken advocate of civil rights for African Americans and other minorities. In 1960 he successfully advocated the passage of a Fair Employment Protection Act to ensure that minorities were not discriminated against in hiring and employment. Penalties were increased for offenders of the existing laws. Welsh issued an executive order throughout the state government ordering an end to any discrimination in hiring for executive positions and ordering an anti-discrimination clause be added into all state contracts.

In 1963 a second law was passed creating the Indiana Civil Rights Commission and given the power to investigate allegations of discrimination, issue cease and desist order, arrest offenders, and issue fines. In June of the same year, Welsh issued an executive order requiring all state departments to use their licensing powers to prohibit discrimination by adding anti-discrimination clauses to their licensing agreements.

In the 1964 Democratic presidential primary election, incumbent President Lyndon Johnson refused to enter any primary races to campaign on his own behalf because he already had enough delegates in the caucus nominating states to win the nomination. Indiana was among the states that held primary elections, and Johnson's challenger, the segregationist Governor of Alabama George C. Wallace, entered the Indiana primary to show that northerners also supported his segregationist platform. Although Johnson did not approach Welsh to take any action, Welsh feared it would hurt the state Democratic party should Wallace win the state primary—and he certainly would win because he was running unopposed. Welsh decided to personally run against Wallace only to deny him a win in Indiana, knowing Johnson had enough support in caucus states to win the nomination. Welsh stumped the state touting his civil rights credentials and denigrating Wallace. His slogan was "Clear the way for LBJ, vote Welsh the fifth of May." During the primary campaign, Welsh had taken part in a Civil War Centennial Tour where he visited the capitals of each of the southern states, except Alabama's, and returned the battle flags captured by Hoosier soldiers during the American Civil War in official ceremonies. Wallace refused to hold such a ceremony and Alabama's captured battle flags still remain on display in the Indiana World War Memorial. In the primary election, Welsh won a victory over Wallace, 376,023 to 172,646. Wallace also won two delegates when he won the northwestern First Congressional District of Gary, Indiana. However, at the national convention, the Hoosiers delegation refused to award the two votes to Wallace. They voted for Welsh on the first ballot; afterwards, Welsh directed his supporters to vote for Johnson.

One of Welsh's most effective long-term changes was his gradual attempt to change the state's position on accepting money from the federal government. Since 1947, Indiana had been under a law that preventing it from accepting any money from the federal government except in cases specifically allowed by the General Assembly. This law had been enacted following the Great Depression and the government's fear at that time of the domination it had come under after accepting major amounts of money from the federal government, and the strings that came attached to it. Welsh was able to have the law overturned, with little fanfare.

=== Louie, Louie ===
Welsh is also known for banning radio stations in Indiana from playing the 1963 hit song "Louie, Louie", for its allegedly-obscene lyrics.

== Later years ==
Constitutionally prevented from seeking a consecutive term, Welsh left office in January 1965 and returned to his law practice in Vincennes. He remained active in the Democratic Party, and had been made a member of national committee in 1964, a position he held until 1968. In 1965, President Johnson appointed him the International Joint Commission that oversaw a range of issues affecting both Canada and the United States, he continued on the commission until 1970. During 1969 he also served on the Indiana Constitutional Revision Committee that authored a series of amendments reorganizing the state courts expanding the power of governors, and making several new constitutional bodies.

In 1972, Welsh was nominated by his party to run for a second term as governor. The campaign was hard-fought and focused much on Welsh's record as governor. His Republican opponent, Dr Otis R. Bowen, attacked him on the tax plan he had enacted, saying that it was a failure, and the state was still suffering from its effects. Welsh touted his experience and civil-rights support, but ultimately lost the election by a decisive margin.

Welsh spent his final years in Vincennes, but died after seeking medical attention in Indianapolis on May 28, 1995, aged eighty-two. Throughout his life he often repeated his motto, "It doesn't cost you anything to be a gentleman," and many of his friends and acquaintances say he lived up to it. His remains were interred in Vincennes' Memorial Park Cemetery.

== Electoral history ==
Indiana gubernatorial election, 1960
Party	Candidate	Votes	%
Democratic	Matthew E. Welsh	1,072,717	50.4
Republican	Crawford F. Parker	1,049,540	49.3

Democratic Presidential Primary in Indiana, 1964
Party	Candidate	Votes	%
Democratic	Matthew E. Welsh	376,023	68.5
Democratic	George Wallace	172,646	31.5

Indiana gubernatorial election, 1972
Party	Candidate	Votes	%
Republican	Otis R. Bowen	1,203,903	56.8
Democratic	Matthew E. Welsh	900,489	42.5

== See also ==
- List of governors of Indiana

Party political offices
Preceded by Ralph Tucker	Democratic nominee for Governor of Indiana; 1960	Succeeded by Roger D. Branigin
Preceded by Robert L. Rock	Democratic nominee for Governor of Indiana; 1972	Succeeded by Larry A. Conrad
Political offices
Preceded by Harold W. Handley	Governor of Indiana; January 9, 1961 - January 11, 1965	Succeeded by Roger D. Branigin
