= Richard E. Folz =

American politician (1922–1973)

Richard Folz

43rd Lieutenant Governor of Indiana
- In office January 13, 1969 – January 8, 1973
- Governor: Edgar Whitcomb
- Preceded by: Robert L. Rock
- Succeeded by: Robert D. Orr

Personal details
- Born: January 14, 1922 Evansville, Indiana, U.S.
- Died: March 5, 1973 (aged 51) Key West, Florida, U.S
- Party: Republican
- Education: Indiana University; Georgetown University

Military service
- Branch/service: United States Navy
- Rank: Lieutenant (junior grade)
- Battles/wars: World War II

Richard Emil Folz (14 January 1922 – 5 March 1973) was a politician from the U.S. state of Indiana. Between 1969 and 1973 he served as Lieutenant Governor of Indiana.

== Life ==
Richard Folz was born in Evansville, Indiana and attended the Evansville Central High School. Later he studied at the Indiana University in Bloomington and at the Georgetown University in Washington D.C. During World War II, he served in the United States Navy as a naval aviator and became a Lieutenant (junior grade). He joined the Republican Party and in 1964 he ran unsuccessfully in the Republican Nomination for State Treasurer of Indiana. In 1967 he became treasurer of the Indiana Republican State Committee.

In 1968 he was elected to the office of the Lieutenant Governor of Indiana. He served in this position between 13 January 1969 and 8 January 1973 when his term ended. In this function he was the deputy of Governor Edgar Whitcomb and he presided over the Indiana Senate. After the end of his political career he moved to Key West, Florida, where he died only a few weeks later.

Political offices
Preceded by Robert L. Rock	Lieutenant Governor of Indiana; 1969–1973	Succeeded by Robert D. Orr
