= Richard O. Ristine =

American politician

Richard Ristine

41st Lieutenant Governor of Indiana
- In office January 9, 1961 – January 11, 1965
- Governor: Matthew E. Welsh
- Preceded by: Crawford F. Parker
- Succeeded by: Robert L. Rock

Member of the Indiana Senate from the Montgomery County and Putnam County district
- In office November 8, 1950 – August 29, 1960
- Preceded by: Oscar Bruce Lane
- Succeeded by: Gilbert Elijah Ogles

Personal details
- Born: Richard Osborne Ristine; January 19, 1920 Crawfordsville, Indiana, U.S.
- Died: June 20, 2009 (aged 89) Leland, Michigan, U.S.
- Party: Republican
- Education: Wabash College (BA); Columbia University (JD)

Military service
- Branch/service: United States Army
- Unit: United States Army Air Corps
- Battles/wars: World War II

Richard Osborne Ristine (January 19, 1920 – June 20, 2009) was an American politician and attorney who served as the lieutenant governor of Indiana from 1961 and 1965.

== Early life and education ==
Richard Ristine was born in Crawfordsville, Indiana. He graduated from Wabash College in 1941 and earned a Juris Doctor from Columbia Law School.

== Career ==
During World War II, Ristine served in the United States Army Air Corps in the Philippines and Japan, where he reached the rank of captain. After his admission to the Indiana State Bar Association, he began working as an attorney. Ristine joined the Republican Party and in 1950 he was elected to the Indiana Senate. Ten years later, he ran successfully for the office of the lieutenant governor of Indiana. He served in this position between January 9, 1961, and January 11, 1965. During his tenure, Ristine voted for Indiana's first sales tax in 1963. He was the Republican nominee in the 1964 Indiana gubernatorial election.

After the end of his political career, Ristine continued his work as a lawyer. He also became a member of the boards of various companies. He also worked as chairman of the Indiana Historical Society.

== Personal life ==
In 1990, he retired and moved to Leland, Michigan, where he died on June 20, 2009.
