= Edgar Whitcomb =

American politician (1917–2016)

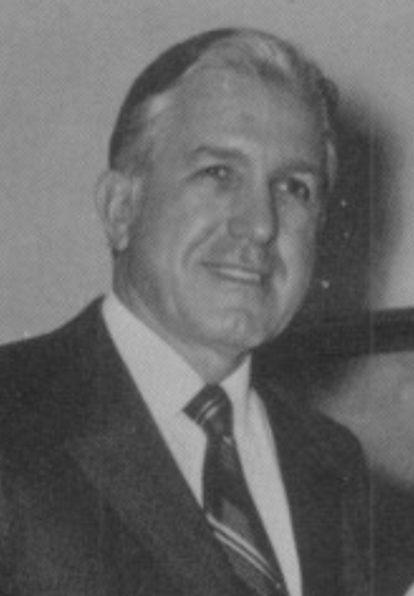

43rd Governor of Indiana
- In office January 13, 1969 – January 8, 1973
- Lieutenant: Richard E. Folz
- Preceded by: Roger D. Branigin
- Succeeded by: Otis Bowen

52nd Secretary of State of Indiana
- In office December 1, 1966 — December 1, 1968
- Governor: Roger D. Branigin
- Preceded by: John D. Bortoff
- Succeeded by: William N. Salin

Member of the Indiana Senate from the Dearborn, Jennings, and Ripley County district
- In office November 8, 1950 – November 3, 1954
- Preceded by: Clyde Martin Matthews
- Succeeded by: James L. Dunn

Personal details
- Born: Edgar Doud Whitcomb; November 6, 1917 Hayden, Indiana, U.S.
- Died: February 4, 2016 (aged 98) Rome, Indiana, U.S.
- Party: Republican
- Spouses: Patricia Dolfus (m. 1953; div. 1986) Mary Evelyn Gayer (m. 2013)
- Children: 5
- Education: Indiana University, Bloomington; Indiana University, Indianapolis

Military service
- Allegiance: United States
- Branch/service: United States Army Air Corps; United States Army Reserve
- Years of service: 1940–1946 (Army Air Corps); 1946–1977 (Army Reserve)
- Rank: Lieutenant (Army Air Corps); Colonel (Army Reserve)
- Battles/wars: World War II • Philippines Campaign • Battle of Bataan • Battle of Corregidor

Edgar Doud Whitcomb (November 6, 1917 – February 4, 2016) was an American attorney, writer and politician, who served as the 43rd governor of Indiana. His term as governor began a major rift in the Indiana Republican Party as urban Republicans became more numerous than rural Republicans, leading to a shift in the priorities of the party leadership.

Whitcomb found himself opposed by speaker of the house Otis Bowen on a number of measures and for control of the party leadership. Despite his opposition, Whitcomb was able to increase tax revenue by 8% without raising tax rates through improved collection and auditing techniques, created a panel of business leaders to recommend governmental reforms aimed at increasing efficiency that allowed the state to reduce its workforce by 10% and fought for a number of budgetary saving measures primarily through reducing state employee wages and spending in non-essential areas.

After leaving office, Whitcomb ran for the U.S. Senate in 1976 but was defeated in the Republican primary by Indianapolis Mayor Richard Lugar. Whitcomb returned to the practice of law and moved to Seymour, Indiana. In 1985, he retired, divorced from his wife of thirty-three years and took up sailboating. He sailed around the Mediterranean Sea, across the Atlantic Ocean in 1990 and geographically sailed around the world in 1995, although he was not able to return to his exact starting point, because his ship ran aground on a reef in the Gulf of Suez. After two days of trying to free the ship, he made the decision to abandon it. Returning to Indiana, he moved to a secluded log cabin on the banks of the Ohio River within the Hoosier National Forest near Rome, Indiana in 2000. He married for a second time in 2013 and died in 2016, aged 98.

== Early life ==
=== Family and military career ===
Whitcomb was born on November 6, 1917, in Hayden, Indiana, the second child and first son of John Whitcomb and Louise Doud Whitcomb. An outgoing and athletic youth, he was a member of his high school basketball team. He entered Indiana University in 1939 to study law, but quit school to join the military at the outbreak of World War II.

He enlisted in the United States Army Air Corps in 1940 and was deployed to the Pacific Theater. He was commissioned as a Second Lieutenant in 1941 and made an aerial navigator. He served two tours of duty in the Philippines and was promoted to First Lieutenant. During the Philippines Campaign, Whitcomb's base was overrun; he was captured by the Japanese and was beaten and tortured by his captors, but was able to escape. Recaptured a few days later, he escaped a second time and was hunted for several more days but was able to evade his pursuers. He escaped by swimming all night through shark-infested waters to an island unoccupied by the Japanese army. He was eventually able to secure passage to China under an assumed name where he made contact with the United States Army. and was repatriated in December 1943. He wrote a book about his experience entitled Escape from Corregidor, published in 1958. He was discharged from active duty in 1946, but he remained in the reserve military forces until 1977 holding the rank of colonel.

Following the war, he returned to and graduated from Indiana University Robert H. McKinney School of Law. He met and married Patricia Dolfuss on May 10, 1953, and the couple had five children. One of his children, his daughter Trish, lost a race for the Indiana House of Representatives in the November 5, 2024 elections, where she ran as a Democrat.

=== Early political career ===
Whitcomb was a Republican. He was first elected to public office in 1950, serving for three years in the Indiana Senate before resigning to begin his law practice. Indiana General Assembly sessions were held biennially during his time in that legislative body; there were no sessions scheduled to convene while he was still in office.

Whitcomb was admitted to the bar in 1954 and began a law practice. He set up a successful law firm in North Vernon, but in later years he moved his practice, having offices in both Seymour and Indianapolis. His law practice helped him build his political base for a run for statewide office.

In 1966, Whitcomb was elected to serve as Secretary of State of Indiana, a position he used to springboard for his political career. He was appointed by the Governor of Indiana to serve on the Great Lakes Compact Commission, a commission with representatives from the Great Lake states who oversaw joint projects for preserving and developing the Great Lakes. He held both offices concurrently until his resignation in December 1968.

== Governor ==
=== Election and infighting ===
At the 1968 Republican state convention, Whitcomb competed to win the nomination for governor against Indiana House of Representatives minority leader Otis Bowen and future Secretary of Agriculture Earl Butz. Backed by the party leaders of several large counties, Whitcomb overcame Bowen and Butz to secure the nomination. Bowen, after being nominated for governor in 1972, advocated the nomination of candidates for governor and US Senator by primary elections. Whitcomb's opponent in the general election was Democratic candidate Robert L. Rock, and the campaign focused largely on tax policy and national issues. Although Democrats had taken strong majorities in the state government in the past two elections, the 1968 election returned the Republicans to power, giving them strong majorities in the General Assembly, and a win in all the congressional and statewide elections, except one. Whitcomb was among the beneficiaries of the cycle and took office on January 13, 1969.

During his term, the state adopted a new districting system that for the first time granted more seats in the Indiana General Assembly to urban areas. The situation created by the new development caused a split in the party between the urban and rural Republicans. Urban Republicans and their representatives tended to favor increasing government-provided services and spending, while the rural Republicans tended to favor reduced spending and more limited government. Whitcomb found himself in party with the rural Republicans, while Bowen, who had become speaker of the house, grew to become a leader among the urban members. Whitcomb vetoed a number of spending bills passed by the assembly and began a fight for control of the party leadership. Whitcomb suffered a stunning political setback on November 25, 1970, when aides failed to block what the Indianapolis News called "a unanimous vote" to elect former Whitcomb supporter and State Treasurer John K. Snyder to the post of Republican Party chairman. The Indianapolis Star, under the front-page banner "Snyder to Head State GOP" on Nov 25, chronicled the Whitcomb political disaster. Highlighting the depth of the defeat, then-President Richard Nixon personally wrote Snyder on December 15, 1970, to express his personal support. (In later years Whitcomb and Snyder resumed their former friendship, which in 1970 was described by the Indianapolis News as "bitter.") In a hardball political move following Snyder's election, Whitcomb diverted Republican political contributions to a special fund in the Governor's office and nearly bankrupted the state party. Snyder subsequently resigned from his leadership position and Whitcomb installed a new chairman, Jim Neal, a newspaper editor from Noblesville, who remained friendly to his positions, but neutral at the 1972 convention. Contemporaneously, Whitcomb resumed collection of the fund to state party coffers. Bowen, meanwhile, had been able to install a number of people in key county leadership positions that effectively gave his wing of the party real control.

=== Government efficiency reforms ===
Despite the party infighting, Whitcomb was able to successfully advocate for the passage of a number of bills to expand the state highway system, to repeal laws passed during his predecessors’ terms that distributed funds to the county governments and to computerize both the state's criminal records and its Bureau of Motor Vehicles. Significant constitutional development took place during his term. Also on the ballot during his election campaign were a number of constitutional amendments, among them a reorganization of the state court system, changing the legislatures sessions to occur annually rather than biennially, a change that would allow governors to begin serving consecutive terms again, and the placing of a new cabinet position(s) in the constitution. Whitcomb however, could not run for a second term because he had been elected under the prior version of the constitution. Another significant event occurred during his first months in office when the Indiana Supreme Court ruled that the pocket veto was unconstitutional, which passed into law several bills that had been pocket vetoed by his predecessors. Whitcomb requested that General Assembly pass an act repealing all laws that were enacted because of the Supreme Court decision, some of which were nearly a century old. The assembly complied with the request and passed a blanket repeal.

Indiana's income had been problematic in the two decades preceding Whitcomb's term and had necessitated major tax increases to fund the growing budget. Whitcomb had committed to not increasing the tax burden on the state in his campaign, but the state was not permitted to take on debt and was in need to growing its reserve funds. To increase the budget surplus, Whitcomb embarked on a number of cost reduction measures that required no legislative support. He created by executive order a commission of sixty business leaders to examine the entire operation of the state government and recommend changes to improve its operational efficiency. He used their findings to alter work flows that resulted in an annual savings of $12 million. They also made recommendations that would improve the efficiency of state taxes through better auditing techniques that once implemented raised state revenue by 8%. Additional savings were realized when because of the vastly improved government efficiency, less staff was needed to complete the work allowing the state to cut its workforce by 10%. Whitcomb also saved money by withholding non-mandatory pay raises for most state employees.

Whitcomb's cost savings plans were strongly opposed by the state teachers’ union, Democrats and a large part of the urban Republicans aggregate. The public, however, was pleased with Whitcomb's actions and he left office with a high approval rating on January 8, 1973. After leaving office he returned to his law practice.

== Later years ==
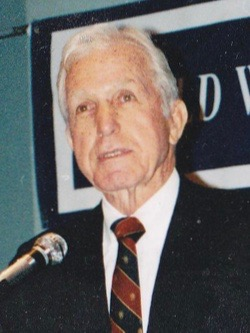
Whitcomb in 2009

In 1976, Whitcomb sought the Republican nomination to the United States Senate, but was defeated in the primary by Indianapolis Mayor Richard Lugar. He then returned to his private law practice which in turn he soon moved to Seymour, Indiana. He served several years as the director of the Mid American World Trade Association and took a job for a media company based in Indianapolis and spent time traveling the United States setting up a network of FM radio stations.

Whitcomb retired from his law practice in 1985, at age 68. He and his wife divorced in 1986 after a thirty-three-year marriage. Whitcomb's second book, On Celestial Wings, was published in 1995. Whitcomb took up sailing as a hobby and purchased a 30-foot (9.1 m) boat. He sailed solo around the Mediterranean, across the Atlantic and with Jeff La Dage in the Pacific Ocean. In 1995, while attempting to sail around the world, his ship hit a reef in the Gulf of Suez and sank. He was rescued and returned to the United States. He wrote a book about his sailing experiences that was published in 2011, titled Cilin II : A Solo Sailing Odyssey. In 2000 he purchased a secluded cabin in Rome, Indiana, on the Ohio River within the Hoosier National Forest. The home has electricity, although cabins he owned did not, and he spent most of his time there gardening, fishing and chopping firewood. During his last public interview in 2004, he told a reporter that he never reads the newspaper and was totally uninvolved in anything, and that he was "living in heaven." He married his long-time partner Evelyn Gayer in a private ceremony at their home in February 2013.

Whitcomb died in his sleep on February 4, 2016, at his home in Rome, Indiana, at the age of 98. He was the last living former American governor born in the 1910s.

== See also ==
- List of governors of Indiana

Political offices
Preceded by John Bortoff	Secretary of State of Indiana; 1966–1968	Succeeded by William Salin
Preceded by Roger Branigin	Governor of Indiana; 1969–1973	Succeeded by Otis Bowen
Party political offices
Preceded by Gerald L. Powell	Republican nominee for Secretary of State of Indiana; 1966	Succeeded by William N. Salin
Preceded by Richard O. Ristine	Republican nominee for Governor of Indiana; 1968	Succeeded by Otis Bowen
Honorary titles
Preceded by Raúl Héctor Castro	Oldest living American governor April 10, 2015 – February 4, 2016	Succeeded by David Buckson
