= George N. Craig =

American politician and 39th governor of Indiana

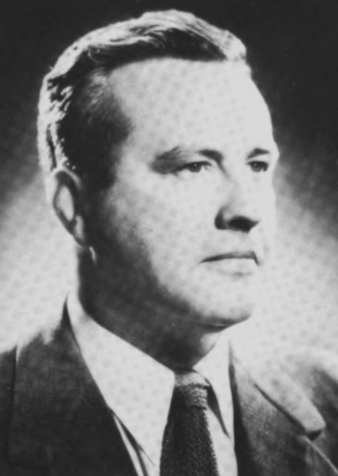

39th Governor of Indiana
- In office January 12, 1953 – January 14, 1957
- Lieutenant: Harold W. Handley
- Preceded by: Henry F. Schricker
- Succeeded by: Harold W. Handley

National Commander of The American Legion
- In office 1949 – 1950
- Preceded by: S. Perry Brown
- Succeeded by: Erle Cocke, Jr.

Personal details
- Born: George North Craig; August 6, 1909 Brazil, Indiana, U.S.
- Died: December 17, 1992 (aged 83) Brazil, Indiana, U.S.
- Party: Republican
- Spouse: Kathryn L. Heiliger
- Children: 2
- Education: Indiana University
- Profession: Politician, lawyer

Military service
- Allegiance: United States
- Branch/service: United States Army
- Years of service: 1941–1946
- Rank: Lieutenant Colonel
- Battles/wars: World War II
- Awards: Bronze Star Medal (OLC); Croix de Guerre; Legion of Honor

George North Craig (August 6, 1909 – December 17, 1992) was an American attorney and politician who served as the 39th governor of Indiana from 1953 until 1957. A lawyer and veteran of World War II who was promoted to serve in a division command staff, Craig first gained popularity in the state as National Commander of The American Legion. He was a political outsider when he ran for governor and was at odds with more conservative party leadership during his time in office. Although he made significant reforms, his term ended with a high-profile bribery scandal, in which it was found that several high-level state employees had been accepting bribes to influence their decisions in assigning construction contracts. Despite his lack of involvement in the scandal, Craig was blamed for it by the public, damaging his reputation and ending his political career.

Angered by the bribery scandal and at odds with party leaders, he left the state after his term and moved to Virginia, where he opened a law office and later became president of an automotive company. After a decade he returned to Indiana, where he retired from public life, but he resumed activity in the Republican Party as a political adviser until his death in 1992.

== Early life ==
George Craig was born August 6, 1909, in Brazil, Indiana, the son of attorney Bernard C. and Clo Branson Craig. He attended local public schools and graduated from Brazil High School in 1927. He enrolled in the University of Arizona in the same year, where he would become a member of the Delta Chi fraternity, and later admitted that he spent little time studying and also joined Kappa Beta Phi, a school-forbidden drinking fraternity. He dropped out in 1929, before he could graduate, and decided to become a lawyer. He enrolled in Indiana University School of Law in 1930, but due to his poor grades from Arizona he was required to meet with the school dean, Paul V. McNutt. After promising to apply himself he was accepted into the school.

Among Craig's classmates was William E. Jenner, who would later become his primary opponent within the Republican Party. The two often argued over politics while in school together. In 1931 Craig married his classmate Kathryn Louisa Heiliger. After graduating with a law degree in 1932, the couple returned to Clay County where they had two children, Margery and John, and Craig began practicing law in his father's firm. As the Great Depression set in, demand for lawyers dropped and Craig had only a few cases a year. He began to become involved in local politics and became the chairman of the county Republican Party in 1938. The following year he became the town of Brazil's attorney. In 1940 the state convention named him a candidate for lieutenant governor, but he did not win the position.

== World War II ==
As the United States entered World War II, Craig decided to enlist in the army. He was mustered in as a first lieutenant in the 18th Infantry Division that was training in Camp Bedford Forrest in Tullahoma, Tennessee. He remained with the division for the remainder of the war. His division was soon dispatched to Great Britain where they participated in the Invasion of Normandy. After commanding a platoon in storming the beach, he was promoted to command a company, and later a battalion in the subsequent liberation of France. After the war he earned a Bronze Star Medal with Oak Leaf Cluster and the Croix de Guerre for his service. As the army began invading Germany, he was promoted to the regimental command staff and then the divisional command staff. There he became acquainted with Supreme Allied Commander Dwight Eisenhower who often visited the division level commanders. His friendship with Eisenhower later played an important role in influencing his position on political issues. After the war in Europe ended, Craig was discharged in 1946 with a final rank of lieutenant colonel.

== The American Legion ==
Craig returned home and resumed his father's law practice which he eventually took over. By the end of 1947, he became involved in The American Legion as the Clay County commander. He quickly rose in the organizations rank, becoming the vice-commander for the state of Indiana, a national committeeman, and in 1949 he was nominated commander of the national organization. The Legion headquarters were in Indianapolis and the group had significant political influence in the state. Command of the organization had been a stepping stone to the governorship for previous men, but Craig denied that he had such ambitions after being elected to the position. He began to travel national and around the state and became acquainted with many national and international dignitaries and high officeholders. The Legion's "Tide for Toys" campaign which was intended to distribute toys to foreign children, was started during his term. He continued his friendship with Eisenhower during his tenure and influenced the organization to support the anti-communist agenda as the Cold War set in. He personally delivered a number of anti-communist speeches. After 14 months as commander he returned to his law firm, which he moved to Indianapolis in December 1950.

== Governor of Indiana ==
=== Political campaign ===
Publicly, Craig announced he intended to leave public life and work as a lawyer for the rest of his career. Secretly, however, he began making arrangement to run for the governorship of Indiana. He was an outsider to the Republican Party leadership and owed his rise in The American Legion largely to patronage from Democrats. Craig was considerably less conservative than the party leadership, of whom William Jenner was chief, and knew that any attempt to run would be opposed by them. Knowing that most state convention delegates were re-elected to each convention, he launched an unprecedented campaign, by personally meeting with hundreds of potential convention delegates before the May election in 1951. He was able to gain enough support to ensure he would be a contender at the convention and then announced his intention to run. Jenner and the party chairman attempted to unite support in favor of one of the other five more conservative candidates, but after three rounds of balloting Craig won the nomination. He later credited the popularity of The American Legion for his victory. Harold W. Handley, of the opposing faction, was nominated to run for lieutenant governor.

The national Republican Party was at that time going through a period of internal problems over their position on communism, and the best way to deal with the threat—both internally and externally. Craig brought the national party's problem to the state. Jenner and the party leadership supported faction of the party was virulently anti-communist, but Craig openly sided with Eisenhower and the wing of the party advocating a more measured response to the problem. Jenner was incensed not only by Craig's position on communism but also on his campaign platform that advocated significant increased state spending and the start of a number of new programs. The difference between Craig and the party continued throughout his time in office. Craig's Democratic opponent was incumbent lieutenant governor John Watkins. Thanks in large part to Eisenhower's popularity, Craig won a landslide victory in the election.

=== Reform agenda ===
Portrait of Craig.

His agenda was largely reform-oriented and included enhancing worker's compensation and unemployment benefits, building new schools, raising teacher's salaries, building a new state prison, constructing new hospitals, and improving traffic safety. Following his inauguration in January 1953, he submitted twenty-six proposals to the Indiana General Assembly that encompassed all of his agenda. His most controversial with the legislation was a proposal to reorganize the states 141 agencies into eleven departments centralized under the governor's control. The Republican legislature dismissed the request out of hand and accused him of trying to restart the battle over executive power that had been ongoing in the past three decades but had largely been avoided by the previous two governors.

Most of Craig's agenda was never implemented as the legislature accused him of not working with them, but in large part, it was his differences with party leaders that caused the problems. A Democratic senator observed that it was as if there were three parties in the assembly—the pro-Craig, the anti-Craig, and the Democratic parties. Craig was successful in having the Department of Corrections created, which he used to implement most of his penal reform. The Uniform Traffic Code was also established, which standardized road signs, speed limits, and traffic rules across the state. Funding was also granted to improve safety by installing signage and signal lights around the state. The police academy was expanded and the first narcotics group. The state police force was expanded to add fifty new officers, making it the largest in the nation at the time. The state's Mental Health Division was also established to reform the state's mental hospitals.

Craig wrangled with the legislature over the creation of major highways around Indiana. The assembly didn't want to pay for the roads, so Craig recommended a toll road be created. The assembly leadership balked at the idea, as toll roads had been abolished decades earlier. The assembly finally authorized the Indiana Toll Road in northern Indiana but refused to build anymore, primarily because they didn't want to allow the governor control over a large number of patronage positions which he could potentially use to gain more power in the party. His other construction recommendations, a state office building, new prisons, and the expansion of Purdue University were ignored by the assembly. They also refused what he believed his most economically valuable proposal, creating a shipping harbor on Lake Michigan.

The state's $22 million budget surplus disappeared during Craig's term, in large part though due to the Korean War bonus paid out to soldiers to enlist that the assembly authorized over Craig's veto. Craig was quoted as saying, "you can't put a bonus on patriotism any more than you can on motherhood." The bonus cost the state $7.6 million. The rest of the surplus was spent on school consolidation as one-room schoolhouses were phased out and students bused to larger centralized facilities.

=== Bribery scandal ===
Craig was featured on the cover of Time magazine in 1955, where his reforms in the state were touted as a national example. Eisenhower praised Craig as a leader and urged the party leaders to help him transition to a federal office. Eisenhower offered to make him Secretary of the Army in 1955, but Craig declined saying he wished to finish his term as governor. In later years, he also said his refusal was in part due to his personal dislike of Secretary of Defense Charles Erwin Wilson. Despite his popularity, he continued to remain at odds with the state party leadership. During the final session of the General Assembly, he recommended that the death penalty be abolished. The request was not considered by the body, and Jenner used it as proof that Craig had abandoned his conservative principles.

Near the end of Craig's term in 1956, a scandal was discovered that implicated the chief of the state highway department and two of Craig's aides, who were accused of accepting bribes to influence their decision on accepting construction contracts. Lieutenant Governor Harold Handley used the situation to attack Craig and accused him of being responsible for the scandal. Craig himself was not found to be personally involved in the plot but was required to testify before a grand jury in 1957 after he left office. When he left the court building, he gave an interview to the press in which he attacked William Jenner and a number of other party leaders for having a political vendetta against him. The scandal and his interview were published around the state and significantly hurt his popularity. In his later years, he said that he forgave Jenner for his actions while Craig was governor and that the two never agreed on anything except the weather.

== Death and legacy ==
In December 1957 Craig and his family left Indiana, largely because of his disgust with the state Republican Party, and moved to Virginia where he opened a law office and later became president of an automotive company. In 1965 he moved again to Los Angeles and continued practicing law. Finally, in 1967, he returned home again to Brazil, Indiana and retired. He resumed some activity in the Republican Party as a political adviser but never made any significant public appearances. He continued practicing law until 1976, and was made a member of the State Board of Law Examiners that year and remained on the board for a decade. He retired in 1986 and lived relatively secluded until his death on December 17, 1992.

== See also ==
- List of governors of Indiana

== Notes ==
Party political offices
Preceded by Hobart Creighton	Republican nominee for Governor of Indiana; 1952	Succeeded by Harold W. Handley
Non-profit organization positions
Preceded by S. Perry Brown	National Commander of The American Legion; 1949 – 1950	Succeeded by Erle Cocke, Jr.
Political offices
Preceded by Henry F. Schricker	Governor of Indiana; January 12, 1953 - January 14, 1957	Succeeded by Harold W. Handley
