= Harold W. Handley =

American politician

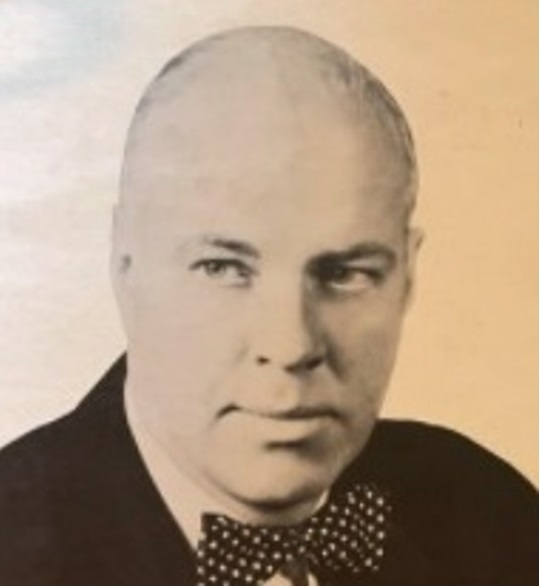
- Photo from 1956 campaign poster

40th Governor of Indiana
- In office January 14, 1957 – January 9, 1961
- Lieutenant: Crawford F. Parker
- Preceded by: George N. Craig
- Succeeded by: Matthew E. Welsh

39th Lieutenant Governor of Indiana
- In office January 12, 1953 – January 14, 1957
- Governor: George N. Craig
- Preceded by: John A. Watkins
- Succeeded by: Crawford F. Parker

Member of the Indiana State Senate from LaPorte County and Starke County
- In office November 3, 1948 – November 5, 1952
- Preceded by: Audley Wallace Mitchell
- Succeeded by: Howard Seymour Steele
- In office November 6, 1940 – January 12, 1942
- Preceded by: Oliver Parr Cannon
- Succeeded by: Charles Francis Wysong

Personal details
- Born: Harold Willis Handley; November 27, 1909 LaPorte, Indiana, U.S.
- Died: August 30, 1972 (aged 62) Rawlins, Wyoming, U.S.
- Resting place: Pine Lake Cemetery, LaPorte, Indiana
- Party: Republican
- Spouse: Barbara Winterble
- Children: 2
- Education: Indiana University Bloomington
- Profession: Salesman

Military service
- Branch/service: United States Army
- Rank: Lieutenant Colonel
- Battles/wars: World War II

Harold Willis Handley (November 27, 1909 – August 30, 1972) was the 40th governor of Indiana from 1957 to 1961. A veteran of World War II, and furniture salesman by trade, Handley began his political career as a state senator. Thanks to his longtime friendship with state party leader and United States Senator William E. Jenner, he was able to secure the nomination to run for lieutenant governor in 1952, during which time he opposed many of the actions of Governor George N. Craig. His popularity rose among the conservative leadership of the Indiana Republican Party and aided him in winning the nomination and subsequent election as governor in 1956.

He was elected during a period of conservative domination of the state government. He successfully implemented major parts of his party's agenda that affected the state for decades. After raising the gasoline tax 50% to balance the state budget, his opponents branded him "High Tax Harold", ignoring the fact that he also eliminated state property taxes. He launched an unprecedented mid-term campaign for a United States Senate seat but ended in defeat and he finished his term as governor. He personally advocated mental health reform in Indiana and after leaving office he remained active in several charities that helped the mentally disabled, winning a Drummer Boy Award in 1970. He operated a successful public relations business in Indianapolis for several years and in 1969 served on the Constitutional Revision Committee that authored a set of major amendments to the state constitution.

== Early life ==
=== Background and education ===
Harold Handley was born November 27, 1909, in LaPorte, Indiana, one of the three sons of Harold Lowell and Lottie Margaret Brackbill Handley. His father was a merchant who sold furniture. He attended local public schools before enrolling in Indiana University Bloomington. His classmates included William E. Jenner and George N. Craig. Handley became good friends with Jenner; the two later became important political allies. Craig however, would become Handley's major opponent within his own party. He studied at the school for four years and graduated in 1932 with a bachelor's degree in economics.

After school Handley returned home where he joined his father's sales department. Although Handley was an able salesman, his company was one of many that folded during the mid-1930s because of the continuing Great Depression. Handley took a new job as a salesman at Unagusta Furniture Corporation, a North Carolina furniture company, but in turn folded in less than a year after he joined it. It was during his period of unemployment that he began to become involved in politics. He formed the Young Republicans of LaPorte County in 1935 and in 1936 he made an unsuccessful run for the Indiana Senate. He remained active in the party and ran for the senate again in 1940 and was elected along with a strong Republican majority to both houses of the body. In the first session of the Indiana General Assembly of his term, he supported the Republican position of repealing almost a decade of Democratic legislation and reorganizing the executive branch of the government to decentralize control away from the governor.

=== World War II ===
After the United States entered World War II in 1941, Handley resigned from the senate and enlisted in the army as a lieutenant, but eventually rose to the rank of lieutenant colonel. He was assigned to the Eighty-eighth Infantry Division headquartered in Mojave Desert. Despite making multiple requests to be sent overseas, the army kept him in the United States for the duration of the war to serve as a trainer for new recruits. As fresh soldiers arrived in the camp he was responsible for overseeing the drill sergeants and ensuring they were properly trained before they were dispatched to serve as reinforcements to the main body of the division.

During his time in the army, he met Barbara Jean Winterble, a psychiatric nurse working at a Red Cross post near his base. The two were married on February 17, 1944, and they moved back to LaPorte after Handley was discharged from the army in 1946. He took a new job in furniture sales and a second job in sales a small movie production company. He soon had two children, Kenneth and Martha Jean.

=== Legislator ===
Handley returned to politics in 1948 after winning election to his former senate seat. It was still a period of Republican domination in the state, and he quickly rekindled his friendship with then-United States Senator William E. Jenner. In the 1952 state convention, George N. Craig, a dark horse candidate, won the nomination to the consternation of the party leadership. Jenner and others had hoped to have a more conservative nominee for governor. They successfully maneuvered Handley as their candidate to win the nomination to run for lieutenant governor. Party tickets were not run at that time, and Handley ran a separate campaign for office, advocating a significantly different platform than Craig, who was calling for many progressive reforms. Thanks in part to the popularity of Dwight Eisenhower, Handley won a landslide victory and defeated his Democratic opponent E. Spencer Dalton by 230,420 votes.

In his role as President of the Senate, Handley became an early opponent of Governor Craig. Craig submitted a plan to reorganize the state's 141 agencies into eleven departments centralized under his leadership, a reversal of the reorganization Handley supported during his first term as a senator. Handley was able to kill all debate on the bill in the Senate and prevent it from passing. The short legislative sessions allowed Handley to focus most of his attention on his statutory offices, serving as the Commissioner of Agriculture and Commissioner of Commerce. He successfully attracted a number of companies to expand and move operations to Indiana, providing thousands of new jobs. He also used his position to build a considerable political base of support.

A scandal in the state highway department was discovered just before the 1956 state Republican Party convention. It was found that three governor-appointed commissioners had accepted bribes to influence their decision in assigning construction contracts. Handley publicly blasted Governor Craig and blamed him for the scandal. Craig had been in a constant battle with the Republican leadership during his term, and they had largely prevented him from gaining control of any of the state's patronage system. Craig later accused Handley, Jenner, and others of purposely attempting to derail his reform agenda and using the bribery scandal, in which Craig was found to be uninvolved in, to tarnish his reputation to end his political career.

== Governorship (1957-1961) ==
=== Campaign ===
At the state convention, Handley ran for the nomination to run for governor with the backing of Senator Jenner. Although Craig tried to block his nomination, Handley was able to overcome his opposition and win the nomination. In the general election, his opponent was Democrat Ralph Tucker. The central election issues were the bribery scandal, the impending state budget deficit, and reform of the state health institutions. Handley also repudiated past governors who had taken federal grant money for selling out control of the state to the federal government. He said "Hoosiers refuse to stand in line in front of the treasury in Washington with tin cups in their hands," and that depending on the federal government for revenue would lead to the ruin of the state. President Eisenhower was running for re-election in the same year, and again thanks in part to his popularity, Handley won a second landslide victory, defeating Tucker by 227,475 votes.

=== Agenda ===
Handley had not advocated any significant agenda items during his term but rather focused on advocating his principles. His party controlled both houses of the Indiana General Assembly, and for the first time in fifty years, they were able to use their power to implement a major Republican agenda. Because of his good relations with the Assembly, they readily passed a number of items he requested.

The most controversial position Harold took was advocating a 50% increase in the state gasoline tax. The bonuses paid to soldiers, and the state's school consolidation plan had used up the budget surplus in 1956. A deficit was predicted for 1957 and 1958, but the state was not permitted to take on debt by the constitution. Members of his party recommended using some of the state's reserve fund to handle the deficit, but ultimately the tax increase was approved, earning him the nickname "High Tax Harold." Handley also successfully advocated the passage of a withholding law that allowed employers to withhold state income taxes from their employee's pay. This led to the discovery of thousands of tax cheats that produced an unexpected windfall for the state government. Hoping to use the situation to restore some confidence in his conservativeness, Handley proposed that most of the state property taxes be repealed. The General Assembly readily agreed and state-level property taxes completely repealed, leaving only some local property taxes in place.

A number of other important laws were passed in Indiana during Handley's administration. The state's first right-to-work law was put in place, but Handley was reluctant to support it. When he finally did sign the bill, his public image had already been tarnished by his opponents who attacked his lack of vigor in helping the common worker. A bill of major importance that Handley supported was also passed, making Indiana the first state to outlaw union shops, leading to a gradual decline in the influence of labor unions. The Interstate Highway system was also started during Handley's term, using $1 billion in federal grants to begin constitution. Before he left office, over 100 metres (0.10 km) had been completed. Some in his own party saw his support of the highway construction as breaking one of his campaign pledges to not accept federal money and the string that came attached to it. Handley countered that the highway was in the best interest of the state and that it was the only exception he would make to his position on accepting federal money.

A number of delayed construction projects were also started during his term, including the building of the Indiana State Office Building to allow for room to be made in the crowded Indiana Statehouse. Funds were granted to expand Purdue University and a new state mental hospital was built.

Chain O'Lakes State Park in Noble County was established in 1960, during Handley's term. Handley spoke at the park's opening ceremony.

=== 1958 Senate campaign ===
Senator William Jenner resigned shortly before the mid-term elections in 1958 and urged Handley to seek his seat. A plan was created where Handley would resign the governorship, his lieutenant would appoint him senator, and he could finish the term. When the plan was revealed to the party leadership, they strongly advised him to not implement it because they feared it would hurt the party and be perceived as a scandal. Handley then decided to have the Secretary of State order an election for the office in November, and Handley himself ran for the position.

Handley did not resign from the governorship during his campaign and was widely criticized for the unprecedented action. His Democratic opponent, Vance Hartke, brought up his tax increase, the breaking of his campaign promise, his reluctance on signing the right-to-work bill, and the rising state unemployment. Statewide unemployment was just above 10% in April, but dropped to 6.9% by the end of September. Handley also faced national backlash against the Republican Party in the wake of the recession in late 1957 and early 1958. Despite Handley's claim to have helped lower unemployment, he lost the election and returned his focus to the governorship.

== Later life ==
The constitution of Indiana prevented governors from serving consecutive terms, making it impossible for Handley to seek re-election. He returned to his private life in his new Indianapolis home after leaving office in January 1961. He had become increasingly interested in helping the intellectually disabled during his time as governor and quickly became involved in several charitable groups. In 1970 he won a Drummer Boy Award from the Retarded Children's Association for his work.

Handley started a public relations and advertising firm based in Indianapolis that became very successful. In 1969, a major revision of the state constitution was finally authorized. He and fellow former Governor Matthew E. Welsh were appointed to the Constitutional Revision Commission. Among the important influences he had on the revision was allowing governors to serve consecutive terms again. The state courts were also reorganized, and a level of appointment power was also returned to the governor. In total seven amendments he helped author were drafted and passed into law.

Handley traveled to Wyoming for a vacation in 1972. He died in Rawlins on August 30 of a heart attack. His remains were returned to Indiana for a public service, and he was buried at the Pine Lake Cemetery in LaPorte. His memoir and gubernatorial papers were donated to the Indiana State Archives.

== Legacy ==
Handley Elementary School in LaPorte is named in honor of Handley. A seven-mile stretch of Indiana State Road 2 from LaPorte's east side to U.S. 20, outside Rolling Prairie, is known as the Harold W. Handley Highway.

== See also ==
- List of governors of Indiana

Party political offices
Preceded by George N. Craig	Republican nominee for Governor of Indiana; 1956	Succeeded by Crawford F. Parker
Preceded by William E. Jenner	Republican nominee for U.S. Senator from Indiana (Class 1); 1958	Succeeded by D. Russell Bontrager
Political offices
Preceded by John A. Watkins	Lieutenant Governor of Indiana; 1953–1957	Succeeded by Crawford F. Parker
Preceded by George N. Craig	Governor of Indiana; January 14, 1957 - January 9, 1961	Succeeded by Matthew E. Welsh
