= Electoral history of Richard Lugar =

List of elections featuring Richard Lugar as a candidate

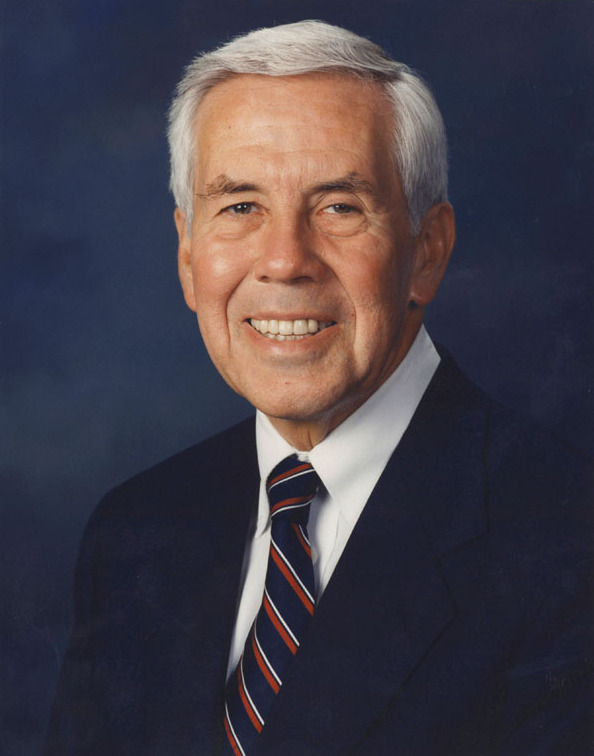
Senator Richard Lugar (R-IN)

Electoral history of Richard Lugar, United States Senator from Indiana (1977–2013), 44th Mayor of Indianapolis (1968–1976), Chairman of the Senate Committees on Foreign Relations (1985–1987, 2003–2007), Agriculture (1995–2001, 2001) and a candidate for the 1996 Republican presidential nomination.

While in the Senate, Lugar was the 5th most senior U.S. Senator and the longest-serving Republican in this body.

Indianapolis mayoral election, 1967:

- Richard Lugar (R) - 72,278 (53.3%)
- John J. Barton (D) (inc.) - 63,284 (46.7%)

Indianapolis mayoral election, 1971:

- Richard Lugar (R) (inc.) - 155,164 (60.5%)
- John Neff (D) - 101,367 (39.5%)

United States Senate election in Indiana, 1974:

- Birch Bayh (D) (inc.) - 889,269 (50.73%)
- Richard Lugar (R) - 814,117 (46.44%)
- Don L. Lee (American) - 49,592 (2.83%)

Republican primary for the United States Senate from Indiana, 1976:

- Richard Lugar - 393,064 (65.45%)
- Edgar D. Whitcomb - 179,203 (29.84%)
- William Costas - 28,329 (4.72%)

United States Senate election in Indiana, 1976:

- Richard Lugar (R) - 1,275,833 (59.03%)
- Vance Hartke (D) (inc.) - 868,522 (40.19%)
- Don L. Lee (American) - 14,321 (0.66%)
- David Lee Hoagland (U.S. Labor) - 2,511 (0.12%)

United States Senate election in Indiana, 1982:

- Richard Lugar (R) (inc.) - 978,301 (53.83%)
- Floyd J. Fithian (D) - 828,400 (45.58%)
- Raymond James (American) - 10,586 (0.58%)

United States Senate election in Indiana, 1988:

- Richard Lugar (R) (inc.) - 1,430,525 (68.14%)
- Jack Wickes (D) - 668,778 (31.86%)

Republican primary for the United States Senate from Indiana, 1994:

- Richard Lugar (inc.) - 398,111 (100.00%)

United States Senate election in Indiana, 1994:

- Richard Lugar (R) (inc.) - 1,039,625 (67.35%)
- Jim Jontz (D) - 470,799 (30.50%)
- Barbara Bourland (LBT) - 17,343 (1.12%)
- Mary Catherine Barton (New Alliance) - 15,801 (1.02%)

Iowa Republican straw poll, 1995:

- Bob Dole - 2,582 (24.38%)
- Phil Gramm - 2,582 (24.38%)
- Pat Buchanan - 1,922 (18.15%)
- Lamar Alexander - 1,156 (10.91%)
- Alan Keyes - 804 (7.59%)
- Morry Taylor - 803 (7.58%)
- Richard Lugar - 466 (4.40%)
- Pete Wilson - 123 (1.16%)
- Bob Dornan - 87 (0.82%)
- Arlen Specter - 67 (0.63%)

New Hampshire Republican vice presidential primary, 1996:

- Colin Powell - 6,414 (25.80%)
- Alan Keyes - 4,200 (16.90%)
- Scattering - 2,631 (10.58%)
- Lamar Alexander - 2,113 (8.50%)
- Richard Lugar - 1,881 (7.57%)
- Phil Gramm - 1,314 (5.29%)
- Steve Forbes - 1,220 (4.91%)
- Pat Buchanan - 1,115 (4.49%)
- Jack Kemp - 970 (3.90%)
- Bob Dole - 930 (3.74%)
- Morry Taylor - 710 (2.86%)
- Al Gore (inc.) - 654 (2.63%)
- Bob Dornan - 401 (1.61%)
- Ross Perot - 108 (0.43%)
- Bill Clinton - 70 (0.28%)
- Ralph Nader - 69 (0.28%)
- Richard P. Bosa - 60 (0.24%)

All candidates run as write-in

Washington Presidential primary for independent voters, 1996:

- Bill Clinton (D) (inc.) - 227,120 (51.08%)
- Bob Dole (R) - 125,154 (28.15%)
- Pat Buchanan (R) - 44,027 (9.90%)
- Steve Forbes (R) - 28,618 (6.44%)
- Alan Keyes (R) - 6,631 (1.49%)
- Lamar Alexander (R) - 5,181 (1.17%)
- Lyndon LaRouche (D) - 3,160 (0.71%)
- Richard Lugar (R) - 2,009 (0.45%)
- Phil Gramm (R) - 1,665 (0.37%)
- Bob Dornan (R) - 1,054 (0.24%)

1996 Republican presidential primaries:

- Bob Dole - 9,024,742 (58.82%)
- Pat Buchanan - 3,184,943 (20.76%)
- Steve Forbes - 1,751,187 (11.41%)
- Lamar Alexander - 495,590 (3.23%)
- Alan Keyes - 471,716 (3.08%)
- Richard Lugar - 127,111 (0.83%)
- Unpledged delegates - 123,278 (0.80%)
- Phil Gramm - 71,456 (0.47%)
- Bob Dornan - 42,140 (0.28%)
- Morry Taylor - 21,180 (0.14%)

Republican primary for the United States Senate from Indiana, 2000:

- Richard Lugar (inc.) - 356,888 (100.00%)

United States Senate election in Indiana, 2000:

- Richard Lugar (R) (inc.) - 1,427,944 (66.56%)
- David L. Johnson (D) - 683,273 (31.85%)
- Paul Hager (LBT) - 33,992 (1.59%)

Republican primary for the United States Senate from Indiana, 2006:

- Richard Lugar (inc.) - 297,488 (100.00%)

United States Senate election in Indiana, 2006:

- Richard Lugar (R) (inc.) - 1,171,553 (87.36%)
- Steve Osborn (LBT) - 168,820 (12.59%)
- Mark Pool (I) (write-in) - 444 (0.03%)
- Jack H. Baldwin (I) (write-in) - 294 (0.02%)

President pro tempore of the United States Senate, 2009:

- Robert Byrd (D) (inc.) - 58 (58.59%)
- Richard Lugar (R) - 41 (41.41%)

Republican primary for the United States Senate from Indiana, 2012:

- Richard Mourdock - 400,321 (60.51%)
- Richard Lugar (inc.) - 261,285 (39.49%)
