= United States Senate elections in Indiana =

United States senators are elected in Indiana to serve in Class 1 and Class 3. Senators serve six years terms and are elected in statewide elections. Beginning in 1914, Indiana began electing senators by popular vote, prior to that senators were elected by the Indiana General Assembly.

This list contains only those elected directly by the voters of the state.

== U.S. Senate elections (Class 1) ==
General election 1916
Party	Candidate	Votes	%
Republican	Harry S. New	337,089	57.8
Democratic	John W. Kern (incumbent)	325,588	46.1
Prohibition	Elwood Haynes	15,598	2.6

General election 1922
Party	Candidate	Votes	%
Democratic	Samuel M. Ralston	558,169	50.9
Republican	Albert J. Beveridge	524,558	47.8

Special election 1926
Party	Candidate	Votes	%
Republican	Arthur R. Robinson (incumbent)	519,401	50.6
Democratic	Evans D. Woollen	496,540	48.4

General election 1928
Party	Candidate	Votes	%
Republican	Arthur R. Robinson (incumbent)	782,144	55.3
Democratic	Albert Stump	623,996	44.1

General election 1934
Party	Candidate	Votes	%
Democratic	Sherman Minton	758,801	51.5
Republican	Arthur R. Robinson (incumbent)	700,103	47.5

General election 1940
Party	Candidate	Votes	%
Republican	Raymond E. Willis	888,070	50.5
Democratic	Sherman Minton (incumbent)	864,803	49.1

General election 1946
Party	Candidate	Votes	%
Republican	William E. Jenner	739,809	54.9
Democratic	M. Clifford Townsend	584,288	43.4

General election 1952
Party	Candidate	Votes	%
Republican	William E. Jenner (incumbent)	1,020,605	52.4
Democratic	Henry F. Schricker	911,169	46.8

General election 1958
Party	Candidate	Votes	%
Democratic	R. Vance Hartke	973,636	56.5
Republican	Harold W. Handley	731,635	42.4

General election 1964
Party	Candidate	Votes	%
Democratic	R. Vance Hartke (incumbent)	1,128,505	54.3
Republican	D. Russell Bontrager	941,519	45.3

General election 1970
Party	Candidate	Votes	%
Democratic	R. Vance Hartke (incumbent)	870,990	50.1
Republican	Richard L. Roudebush	866,707	49.9

General election 1976
Party	Candidate	Votes	%
Republican	Richard Lugar	1,275,833	58.8
Democratic	R. Vance Hartke (incumbent)	878,522	40.5

General election 1982
Party	Candidate	Votes	%
Republican	Richard Lugar (incumbent)	978,301	53.8
Democratic	Floyd Fithian	828,400	45.6
American	Raymond James	10,586	0.6

General election 1988
Party	Candidate	Votes	%
Republican	Richard Lugar (incumbent)	1,430,525	68.1
Democratic	Jack Wickes	668,778	31.9

1994 General Election
Party	Candidate	Votes	%
Republican	Richard Lugar (incumbent)	1,039,625	67.4
Democratic	Jim Jontz	470,799	30.5
Libertarian	Barbara Bourland	17,343	1.1
New Alliance	Mary Catherine Barton	15,801	1.0
Majority		568,826	
Turnout		1,543,568	

2000 General Election
Party	Candidate	Votes	%
Republican	Richard Lugar (incumbent)	1,427,944	66.5
Democratic	David Johnson	683,273	31.9
Libertarian	Paul Hager	33,992	1.6
Majority		744,71	
Turnout		2,145,209	55

2006 General Election
Party	Candidate	Votes	%
Republican	Richard Lugar (incumbent)	1,171,553	87.3
Libertarian	Steve Osborn	168,820	12.6
No party	Write-Ins	738	0.1
Majority		1,002,733	
Turnout		1,341,111	40

2012 General Election
Party	Candidate	Votes	%
Democratic	Joe Donnelly	1,281,181	50.04
Republican	Richard Mourdock	1,133,621	44.28
Libertarian	Andrew "Andy" Horning	145,282	5.67
No party	Write-Ins	18	0.00
Majority		147,560	
Turnout		2,560,102	

2018 General Election
Party	Candidate	Votes	%
Republican	Mike Braun	1,161,546	50.77
Democratic	Joe Donnelly (incumbent)	1,025,178	44.81
Libertarian	Lucy Brenton	101,153	4.42
No party	Others	70	0.00
Majority		136,368	
Turnout		2,287,947	

2024 General Election
Party	Candidate	Votes	%	
Republican	Jim Banks	1,659,416	58.64%	+7.91%
Democratic	Valerie McCray	1,097,061	38.77%	−6.07%
Libertarian	Andrew Horning	73,233	2.59%	−1.83%
Write-in		187	0.00%	
Total votes		2,829,897	100.0%	

== U.S. Senate elections (Class 3) ==
General election 1914
Party	Candidate	Votes	%
Democratic	Benjamin Shively (incumbent)	272,249	42.1
Republican	Hugh Miller	226,766	35.1
Progressive	Albert J. Beveridge	108,581	16.8

Special election 1916
Party	Candidate	Votes	%
Republican	James E. Watson	335,193	47.7
Democratic	Thomas Taggart (incumbent)	325,607	46.3

General election 1920
Party	Candidate	Votes	%
Republican	James E. Watson (incumbent)	681,854	54.6
Democratic	Thomas Taggart	514,191	41.2

General election 1926
Party	Candidate	Votes	%
Republican	James E. Watson (incumbent)	522,737	50.0
Democratic	Albert Stump	511,454	49.0

General election 1932
Party	Candidate	Votes	%
Democratic	Frederick Van Nuys	870,053	55.6
Republican	James E. Watson (incumbent)	661,750	42.3

General election 1938
Party	Candidate	Votes	%
Democratic	Frederick Van Nuys (incumbent)	738,366	49.8
Republican	Raymond E. Willis	753,189	49.5

Special election 1944
Party	Candidate	Votes	%
Republican	William E. Jenner	857,250	52.1
Democratic	Cornelius O'Brien	775,417	47.1

General election 1944
Party	Candidate	Votes	%
Republican	Homer E. Capehart	829,489	50.2
Democratic	Henry F. Schricker	807,766	48.9

General election 1950
Party	Candidate	Votes	%
Republican	Homer E. Capehart (incumbent)	844,303	55.2
Democratic	Alex M. Campbell	844,303	48.4

General election 1956
Party	Candidate	Votes	%
Republican	Homer E. Capehart (incumbent)	1,084,262	51.7
Democratic	Claude R. Wickard	871,761	44.4

General election 1962
Party	Candidate	Votes	%
Democratic	Birch Bayh	905,491	50.3
Republican	Homer E. Capehart (incumbent)	894,548	49.7

General election 1968
Party	Candidate	Votes	%
Democratic	Birch Bayh (incumbent)	1,060,456	51.7
Republican	William D. Ruckelshaus	988,571	48.2

General election 1974
Party	Candidate	Votes	%
Democratic	Birch Bayh (incumbent)	889,269	50.7
Republican	Richard G. Lugar	814,114	46.4

General election 1980
Party	Candidate	Votes	%
Republican	Dan Quayle	1,182,414	53.8
Democratic	Birch Bayh (incumbent)	1,015,922	46.2

General election 1986
Party	Candidate	Votes	%
Republican	Dan Quayle (incumbent)		61.1
Democratic	Jill L. Long		38.9

1992 General Election
Party	Candidate	Votes	%
Republican	Dan Coats (incumbent)	1,267,972	57.3
Democratic	Joseph Hogsett	900,148	40.8
Libertarian	Steve Dillon	35,733	1.6
New Alliance	Raymond Tirado	7,474	0.3
No party	Write-Ins	99	0.0
Majority		367,824	
Turnout		2,211,426	

1998 General Election
Party	Candidate	Votes	%
Democratic	Evan Bayh	1,012,244	63.7
Republican	Paul Helmke	552,732	34.8
Libertarian	Rebecca Sink-Burris	23,641	1.5
Majority		459,512	
Turnout		1,588,617	

2004 General Election
Party	Candidate	Votes	%
Democratic	Evan Bayh (incumbent)	1,496,976	61.7
Republican	Marvin Scott	903,913	37.2
Libertarian	Albert Barger	27,344	1.1
Majority		593,063	
Turnout		2,428,233	58

2010 General Election
Party	Candidate	Votes	%
Republican	Dan Coats	952,116	54.58
Democratic	Brad Ellsworth	697,775	40.00
Libertarian	Rebecca Sink-Burris	94,330	5.42
No party	Write-Ins	260	0.01
Majority		254,341	
Turnout		1,744,481	

2016 General Election
Party	Candidate	Votes	%
Republican	Todd Young	1,423,991	52.11
Democratic	Evan Bayh	1,158,947	42.41
Libertarian	Lucy Brenton	149,481	5.47
No party	Write-Ins	127	0.00
Majority		265,044	
Turnout		2,732,546	

2022 General Election
Party	Candidate	Votes	%
Republican	Todd Young (incumbent)	1,090,390	58.62
Democratic	Thomas McDermott Jr.	704,480	37.87
Libertarian	James Sceniak	63,823	3.43
No party	Write-ins	1,461	0.08

== See also ==
- Elections in Indiana

== Sources ==
- Congressional Quarterly's Guide to U.S. Elections. Congressional Quarterly Inc. 1976. ISBN 0-87187-072-X.
