= 1971 Indianapolis mayoral election =

Indianapolis mayoral election, 1971
- November 2, 1971
- Turnout: 53.8%
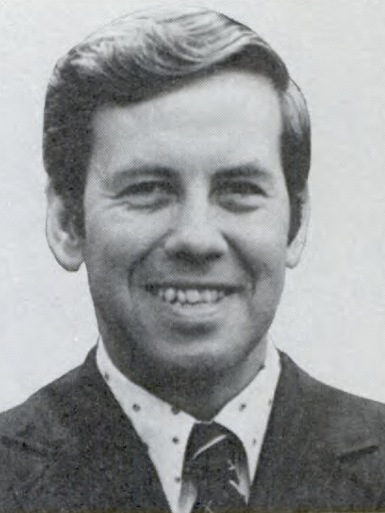

| Nominee | Richard Lugar | John Neff |
| Party | Republican | Democratic |
| Popular vote | 155,164 | 101,367 |
| Percentage | 60.5% | 39.5% |
Mayor before election
Richard Lugar
Republican
Elected mayor
Richard Lugar
Republican

The Indianapolis mayoral election of 1971 took place on November 2, 1971. This was the first election after the creation of the Unigov. Incumbent Republican Richard Lugar was reelected to a second term. Lugar's challenger had been Democrat John Neff, a former state senator. Neff had campaigned in opposition to the Unigov, promising to seek its abolishment if elected.

== Election results ==
Indianapolis mayoral election, 1967
| Party | Candidate | Votes | % |
|---|---|---|---|
| Republican | Richard Lugar (incumbent) | 155,164 | 60.5 |
| Democratic | John Neff | 101,367 | 39.5 |
| Turnout | | 256,531 | 53.8 |
| Majority | | 53,797 | 21.0 |
| Republican hold | | | |

== See also ==
- Electoral history of Richard Lugar

| Preceded by 1967 | Indianapolis mayoral election 1971 | Succeeded by 1975 |
