= Richard Lugar =

American politician (1932–2019)

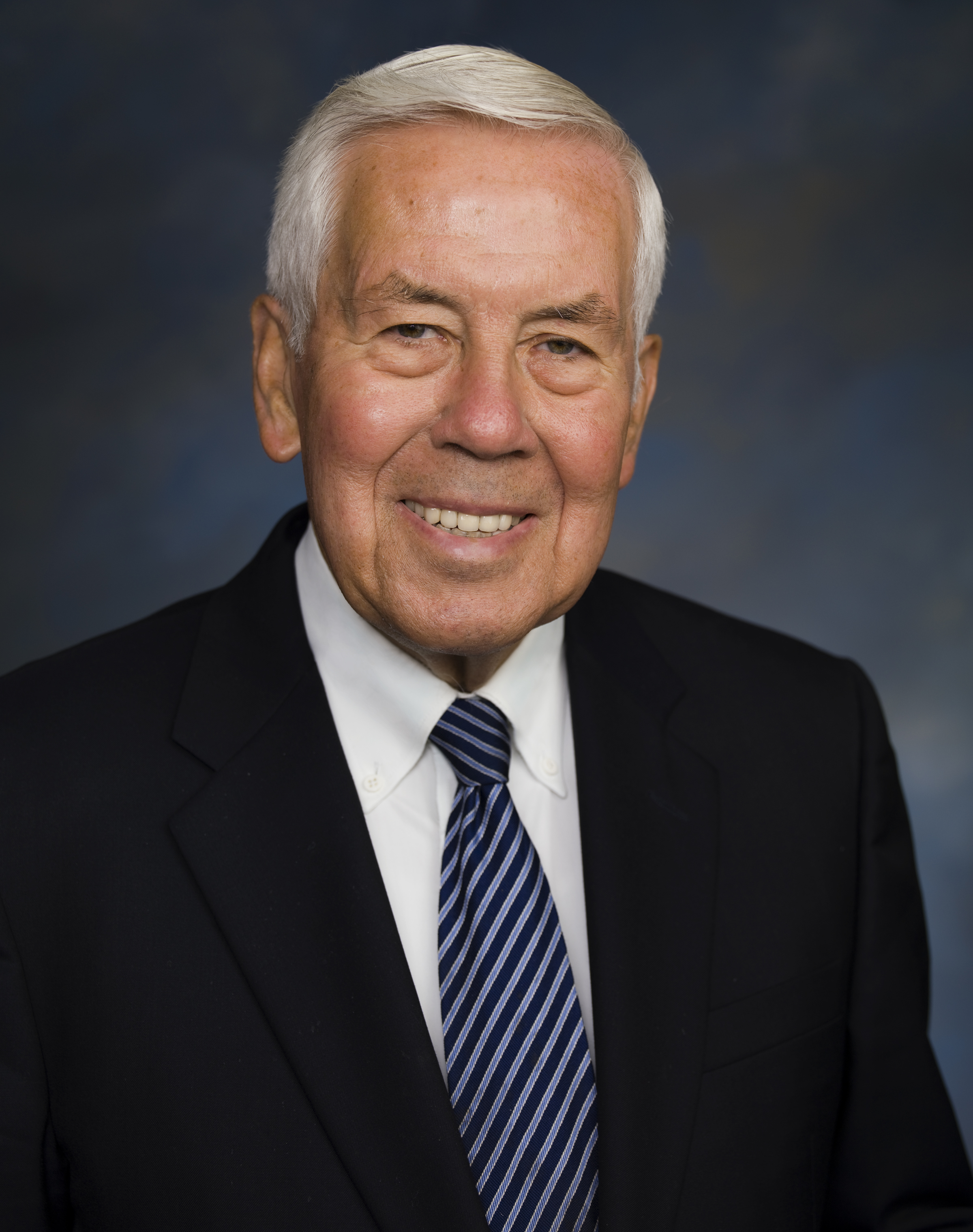
- Official portrait, 2010

United States Senator from Indiana
- In office January 3, 1977 – January 3, 2013
- Preceded by: Vance Hartke
- Succeeded by: Joe Donnelly
Senate positions
Chair of the Senate Foreign Relations Committee
In office January 3, 2003 – January 3, 2007
Preceded by	Joe Biden
Succeeded by	Joe Biden
In office January 3, 1985 – January 3, 1987
Preceded by	Chuck Percy
Succeeded by	Claiborne Pell
Chair of the Senate Agriculture Committee
In office January 20, 2001 – June 6, 2001
Preceded by	Tom Harkin
Succeeded by	Tom Harkin
In office January 4, 1995 – January 3, 2001
Preceded by	Patrick Leahy
Succeeded by	Tom Harkin
Chair of the National Republican Senatorial Committee
In office January 3, 1983 – January 3, 1985
Leader	Robert H. Michel
Preceded by	Bob Packwood
Succeeded by	John Heinz

44th Mayor of Indianapolis
- In office January 1, 1968 – January 1, 1976
- Preceded by: John Barton
- Succeeded by: William Hudnut

44th President of the National League of Cities
- In office 1971
- Preceded by: Frank Curran
- Succeeded by: Sam Massell

Personal details
- Born: Richard Green Lugar; April 4, 1932 Indianapolis, Indiana, U.S.
- Died: April 28, 2019 (aged 87) Falls Church, Virginia, U.S.
- Resting place: Arlington National Cemetery
- Party: Republican
- Spouse: Charlene Smeltzer (m. 1956)
- Children: 4
- Education: Denison University (BA); Pembroke College, Oxford (MA)

Military service
- Branch/service: United States Navy
- Years of service: 1957–1960
- Rank: Lieutenant, junior grade
- Lugar's voice Lugar speaks on the Nunn–Lugar Act; Recorded November 25, 1991

Richard Green Lugar (/ˈluɡər/ LOO-gər; April 4, 1932 – April 28, 2019) was an American politician who served as a United States senator from Indiana from 1977 to 2013. He was a member of the Republican Party.

Born in Indianapolis, Lugar graduated from Denison University and the University of Oxford. He served on the Indianapolis Board of School Commissioners from 1964 to 1967 before he was elected to two terms as mayor of Indianapolis, serving from 1968 to 1976. During his tenure as mayor, Lugar served as the president of the National League of Cities in 1971 and gave the keynote address at the 1972 Republican National Convention.

In 1974, Lugar ran his first campaign for the U.S. Senate, losing to Democratic incumbent Birch Bayh. He ran again in 1976, defeating Democratic incumbent Vance Hartke. Lugar continued to be reelected until 2012, when he was defeated by Indiana State Treasurer Richard Mourdock in the Republican primary by 21 points, who subsequently lost in the general election to Democrat Joe Donnelly, ending his 36-year tenure in the U.S. Senate. Lugar ran for the Republican nomination for president of the United States in the 1996 primaries but lack of success led to his withdrawal early in the campaign.

During Lugar's tenure, he served as chairman of the Senate Committee on Foreign Relations from 1985 to 1987 and from 2003 to 2007, serving as the ranking member of the committee from 2007 until his departure in 2013. Lugar led a U.S. monitoring team for the 1986 Philippine presidential election, where he concluded that widespread fraud was committed by the government of dictator Ferdinand Marcos, which preceded the People Power Revolution that deposed Marcos. Lugar also twice served as chairman of the Senate Committee on Agriculture, Nutrition and Forestry, from 1995 to 2001 and briefly again in part of 2001. Much of Lugar's work in the Senate was toward the dismantling of nuclear, biological, and chemical weapons around the world, co-sponsoring his most notable piece of legislation with Georgia Democrat Sam Nunn: the Nunn–Lugar Act.

Following his service in the Senate, Lugar created a nonprofit organization that specializes in the policy areas he pursued while in office.

== Early life, education, and early career ==
Richard Lugar was born on April 4, 1932, in Indianapolis, Indiana, the son of Bertha (née Green) and Marvin Lugar. He was of part German descent. Lugar attended Shortridge High School. During this time he attained the rank of Eagle Scout, the Boy Scouts' highest. Later, he became a recipient of the Distinguished Eagle Scout Award from the Boy Scouts of America. He graduated first in his class at Shortridge High School in 1950 and from Denison University in 1954, where he was a member of Beta Theta Pi. He went on to attend Pembroke College, Oxford, England, as a Rhodes Scholar, where he read philosophy, politics and economics. At Oxford, Lugar was a member of the Oxford University men's basketball team that won the 1955 A.B.B.A. National Championship. He served in the United States Navy from 1956 to 1960; one of his assignments was as an intelligence briefer for Admiral Arleigh Burke. He achieved the rank of Lieutenant, Junior Grade.

Lugar managed his family's 604-acre (244 ha) Marion County corn, soybean, and tree farm. Before entering public life, he helped his brother Tom manage the family's food machinery manufacturing business in Indianapolis.

== Indianapolis politics and mayorship ==
Lugar served on the Indianapolis Board of School Commissioners from 1964 to 1967. He was elected mayor of Indianapolis in 1967, at the age of 35, defeating incumbent Democrat John J. Barton, and began serving the first of two mayoral terms in 1968. (A political cartoon of the time questioned how an Eagle Scout could survive in the world of politics.) He was closely associated with the adoption of Unigov in 1970, which unified the governments of Indianapolis and Marion County. The Unigov plan helped trigger Indianapolis's economic growth and earned Lugar the post of president of the National League of Cities in 1971. In 1972, Lugar was a keynote speaker at the Republican National Convention. During this time he became known as "Richard Nixon's favorite mayor", owing to his support for devolving federal powers to local communities. When Nixon visited Indianapolis in February 1970, he stated during a speech that he would meet with Lugar and other mayors ahead of a conference with governors on environmental issues. On March 14, 1974, Lugar dismissed Police Chief Winston L. Churchill following allegations of widespread corruption in the Indianapolis Police Department. Lugar stated the dismissal came following meetings with dozens of policemen and after having had the counsel of a seven-member committee of citizens to aid in the investigation.

== U.S. Senate ==
=== Elections ===
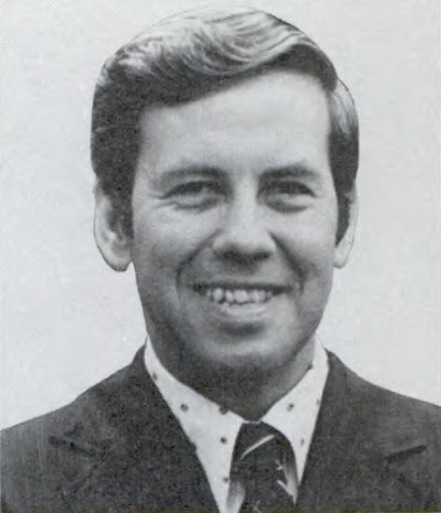
Lugar in 1977, during his first term in the Senate

2012 Indiana U.S. Senate Republican primary Mourdock—70–80% Mourdock—60–70% Mourdock—50–60% Lugar—50–60%

Lugar first ran for the United States Senate in 1974 and lost to incumbent Democratic U.S. Senator Birch Bayh 51% to 46%. In 1976, he defeated Indiana's other U.S. senator, Democratic Senator Vance Hartke, by a margin of 59% to 40%.

In 1982, he defeated Democratic Congressman Floyd Fithian 54% to 46% to win a second term. Six years later, Lugar won reelection to a third term, defeating Democrat Jack Wickes 68% to 32%. In 1994, Lugar won a fourth term, defeating Democratic former U.S. Congressman Jim Jontz (67–31%). He became the first U.S. senator from Indiana to be elected to a fourth term.

Lugar went on to serve a total of six terms in the Senate, defeating Democrat David Johnson 67% to 32% in 2000 and defeating Libertarian Steve Osborn 87% to 13% in 2006 in a contest in which the Democratic Party did not field a candidate. His was the highest-percentage win of the 2006 Senate elections despite a Democratic takeover of Washington.

In 2012, Lugar ran for reelection to a seventh term. Due to Lugar's unpopularity among some Tea Party voters because of his positions regarding illegal immigration, voting to confirm then-U.S. Supreme Court nominees Sonia Sotomayor and Elena Kagan, the DREAM Act, the New START Treaty, some gun control bills, and congressional earmarks, he was challenged by Tea Party-backed State Treasurer Richard Mourdock in a Republican primary. Mourdock defeated Lugar, 61% to 39%, and went on to lose the general election to incumbent Democratic Representative Joe Donnelly. Lugar carried only three counties, Boone, Marion, and Tippecanoe. He was the first six-term U.S. senator to lose his seat in a primary election since Kenneth McKellar in 1952.

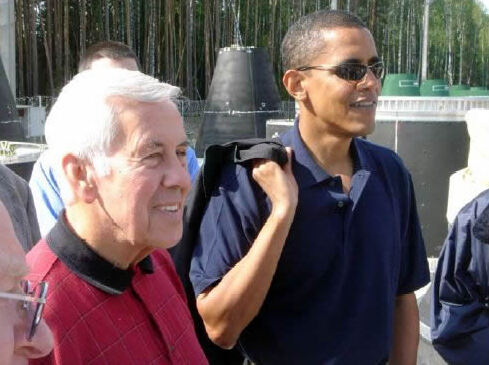
Richard Lugar with then-Senator Barack Obama in August 2005 near Perm, Russia

=== Tenure ===
==== 1970s ====
Future governor of Indiana Mitch Daniels served as Lugar's chief of staff from 1977 to 1982. During the 1980 Republican National Convention, Lugar was rumored as a potential vice presidential nominee for presidential nominee Ronald Reagan.

In his first months, Lugar backed legislation prompting the Senate to adopt a stringent code of ethics intended to assist with the restoration of public confidence in Congress.

On June 30, 1978, the Senate voted to approve granting New York City long term federal loan guarantees of $1.5 billion that the city had cited as essential to its prevention of bankruptcy. The measure was a compromise proposal by Lugar and Wisconsin Senator William Proxmire. Later that day, during a news conference, Senator Jacob Javits (D-NY) thanked Lugar and Proxmire.

==== 1980s ====
Lugar attended the January 7, 1980, signing ceremony of the Chrysler Corporation Loan Guarantee Act of 1979 in the Cabinet Room. Lugar addressed President Jimmy Carter during the ceremony by thanking him for signing what Lugar called "very humane and compassionate legislation" that was important for the United States.

In the early months of the Reagan administration, Lugar supported its program to eliminate all restrictions on planting and marketing of peanuts. An April 30, 1981, vote by members of the Senate Agriculture Committee continued the restrictions.

On May 11, 1981, the Senate Foreign Relations Committee voted in favor of implementing restrictions on American aid to El Salvador requiring President Reagan to verify the Salvadorian government was using the funds to implement human rights along with political and economic changes. The measure was opposed by Lugar who voted against the entirety of its conditions.

Lugar was one of four senators on the Senate Foreign Relations Committee to vote against the Senate rejecting the nomination of Ernest W. Lefever for Assistant Secretary of State for Human Rights on June 5, 1981.

On October 15, 1981, Lugar voted against the recommendation of the disapproval toward the Reagan administration's intent to sell Awacs radar surveillance planes and other air-combat equipment to Saudi Arabia.

On December 2, 1981, Lugar voted in favor of an amendment to Reagan's MX missiles proposal that would divert the silo system by $334 million as well as earmark further research for other methods that would allow giant missiles to be based. The vote was seen as a rebuff of the Reagan administration.

In 1982, Lugar cosponsored a housing bill that would provide middle-class purchasers of new homes with mortgage subsidies, which he referred to as "an emergency jobs program" that would provide 700,000 Americans with jobs in the housing and related industries while costing $5 billion over the following five years. The cancellation of an April meeting of the Senate Banking, Housing, and Urban Affairs Committee to discuss how far-reaching the bill should be was seen as crippling to its chances of implementation.

On December 23, 1982, Lugar voted in favor of a 5 cent a gallon increase on gasoline taxes across the U.S. to aid the financing of highway repairs and mass transit. The bill passed on the last day of the 97th United States Congress.

On July 13, 1983, Lugar voted in favor of an authorization to appropriate $130 million toward the development of nerve gas bombs and shells.

Lugar led the February 2, 1984, hearing of William A. Wilson, Reagan's nominee for United States Ambassador to the Holy See.

In March 1984, Lugar voted in favor of a constitutional amendment authorizing periods in public school for silent prayer and Reagan's unsuccessful proposal for a constitutional amendment permitting organized school prayer in public schools.

Lugar voted against the May 1984 budget freeze meant to reduce the budget deficit.

United States Secretary of Transportation Elizabeth Dole announced Reagan's support for legislation that would force states to raise the minimum drinking age to 21 during a news conference on June 13, 1984. Lugar stated that he, along with Dole, had convinced Reagan to change his mind through "the work of groups like MADD (Mothers Against Drunk Driving) and the concern of hundreds of high school organizations called SADD (Students Against Driving Drunk)". Lugar noted his commitment to working on bipartisan support for the legislation. The same month, Lugar voted in favor of legislation restricting federal highway funds for states that did not raise the minimum age for drinking to 21.

In late January 1986, Lugar was assigned to lead a 19-member delegation of observers to the 1986 Philippine "snap" presidential election scheduled for February 7; Pennsylvania representative John P. Murtha was later assigned as co-chair for the delegation. Lugar had previously been vocal in asking Philippine President Ferdinand Marcos to hold a free and fair election in the country. Among the delegates were political commentator Ben Wattenberg, Senator Thad Cochran of Mississippi, representative Bob Livingston of Louisiana, Colorado secretary of state Natalie Meyer, Kansas secretary of state Jack Brier, and Bishop Adam J. Maida of Green Bay, Wisconsin. Upon their return to the United States, the delegates were divided on whether the fraud and violence seen during the election was widespread. Nevertheless, by February 18, Lugar dismissed the government's vote count favoring Marcos to conclude that the election was "a rejection of President Marcos" and a victory for Corazon Aquino, and stated that Marcos "ought to consider the fact that he has lost the confidence of the Government of the United States and that he ought to step aside" if he was unable to hold a fair election anew. On February 25, 1986, Marcos and his cabinet were deposed by the non-violent People Power Revolution, with the Marcos family fleeing to Hawaii; Corazon Aquino was then installed as the country's president.

On May 9, 1986, Lugar held a news conference designed to coincide with the beginning of the Manila visit by Secretary of State George P. Shultz, during which he criticized the Reagan administration for what he perceived as a lack of support for the Philippine government under the rule of President Aquino and accused former president Marcos of using his Hawaii haven as an area to make hundreds of telephone calls to former allies still in Manila for the purpose of making his potential return to power of active speculation. The fiscal year of 1986 included the United States providing $236 million to the Philippines. Reagan also sought an additional $100 million for economic aid and $50 million for military aid. During a June 3 panel on the subject of providing aid for Manila, Lugar stated his support for the United States providing another $100 million to the government of President Aquino and called on the chamber to recognize Aquino's government "is threatened not only by a communist insurgency but also by a possible challenge from the political right".

In November 1986, amid the Iran–Contra affair, Lugar stated that Reagan did not understand the law requiring a president to inform Congress in a timely fashion over operations and that Reagan's rhetoric on the third party arm shipments had been confusing. He also stressed that the president had not been damaged in his credibility. Around this time, Lugar conferred with John Poindexter, a key figure in the scandal. After the 1987 State of the Union Address, Lugar stated that he believed Reagan had taken responsibility for the Iran–Contra affair by acknowledging that the deal had been unsuccessful.

The 1986 midterm election featured 22 of the 53 Senate Republicans up for reelection. In late 1984, Lugar predicted that "a number of our people are not going to win in '86" unless there was economic growth. The Republicans lost eight seats that election cycle. Shortly after the midterms, on November 13, it was disclosed that Senator Jesse Helms would challenge Lugar for ranking Republican on the Senate Foreign Relations Committee, Helms telling Lugar in a letter that the challenge would not have occurred had the Republicans maintained a majority in the Senate as "the ranking minority post is a different matter". On January 6, 1987, Republican members of the Senate Foreign Relations Committee voted unanimously to retain Lugar as their ranking member. After the results, Lugar stated that he saw his win as a vote of confidence in his leadership.

In January 1988, the Senate began work on the ratification of the Intermediate-Range Nuclear Forces Treaty. Later that month, Lugar met with German Minister for Foreign Affairs Hans-Dietrich Genscher to discuss the INF Treaty, Lugar stating afterward that he was confident the treaty would eventually be ratified despite developments in the process. Lugar believed technical errors existed within the treaty, aligning him with Senate critics of the measure, but differed from them on when they should be improved. Lugar voted in favor of the treaty in May when it passed overwhelmingly in the Senate on May 27.

Lugar attended the July 11, 1988, White House meeting on the subject of legislation to provide financial relief to farmers affected by the showers in the Midwestern and Southern United States, Lugar during which he indicated that there was willingness on the part of his political party to support the measure. On August 11, 1988, Reagan signed the Disaster Assistance Act of 1988 into law. During the ceremony, Reagan noted Lugar as one of the members of Congress "who've done so much to make this possible".

After Vice President George H. W. Bush selected Lugar's fellow Indiana senator Dan Quayle for his running mate in the 1988 Presidential election, Lugar spoke with Bush by telephone about his pick of Quayle: "The Vice President told me he wanted somebody of a distinctly different generation. It was obvious he felt that was more important than some other considerations. I certainly understand that." In a September 28, 1988, news conference, Democratic vice-presidential nominee Lloyd Bentsen cited Lugar as one of three "heavyweight" Republican senators who were more qualified for the vice presidential nomination than Quayle. On December 12, 1988, Lugar attended Vice President-elect Quayle's first news conference following the election, during which Quayle stated the Bush administration would be seeking his aid along with that of Dan Coats in pushing their agenda through Congress.

==== 1990s ====
In February 1990, Lugar announced that the congressional group President Bush named to observe Nicaragua elections the following month was disbanded following their being denied visas by the Nicaraguan government.

In 1990, after Bush nominated James E. Cason to be Assistant Secretary for Natural Resources and Environment, the latter received scrutiny for his record during the Reagan administration. During a September hearing, Lugar "asked a series of probing questions on the spotted owl", and questioned him during a hearing the following month regarding his record at the Interior Department. On October 19, 1990, the Senate Agriculture Committee voted to recommend Cason for Assistant Agriculture Secretary.

on August 21, 1990, Lugar told reporters that the move to a marketing economy on the part of Vietnam had created the possibility for American investment provided that differences between Washington and Hanoi be resolved.

On October 2, 1990, Lugar voted in favor of the nomination of David Souter for Associate Justice on the United States Supreme Court.

In November 1990, amid Bush's handling of the Persian Gulf crisis, Lugar observed that Bush should "call back the Congress and get an affirmative vote to authorize our staying power over there so that the world knows that we're going to back up whatever the President is doing."

In June 1991, Lugar joined fellow Senators William Cohen and John Warner in revealing their dissent with space-based weapons, a central component of the Bush administration's version of the Strategic Defense Initiative, in a letter and speeches. The three offered an alternative that "would defer the deployment of 1,000 missile-destroying rockets in space, while calling for greater levels of ground-based missile defenses".

On November 25, 1991, the Senate voted in favor of approving the Bush administration-backed package to transfer $500 million of the Pentagon budget to assist with dismantling Soviet nuclear weapons. In support of the measure, Lugar said, "We can either seize the opportunity for cooperative efforts in this field now or witness a quantum leap in the proliferation of weapons of mass destruction in the next few years."

During the 1992 election cycle, Lugar stated President Bush needed to signal that his reelection campaign was "a new campaign with a new game plan and a new vigor" and the best results would be formed through a message on "growth and jobs".

In February 1993, after Secretary of State Warren Christopher declared that the United States would only use military power in seeking a settlement as it pertained to Bosnia, Lugar's spokesman stated that during a telephone conversation between Christopher and Lugar, the secretary of state said "that the United States could contribute as many as 5,000 to 10,000 American troops to a 40,000-member NATO force that would go to Bosnia under United Nations auspices after a new peace accord is concluded". Lugar attended the April 28, 1993, meeting between President Bill Clinton and lawmakers over American involvement in Bosnia. Following its conclusion, Lugar stated the president's views: "He had a positive feeling towards lifting the embargo—that justice has to be served in that respect. But the President was much less certain about heading down the trail of air strikes." Weeks later, on May 11, Lugar met with Clinton on the subject of Bosnia, Lugar stating afterward that Clinton had developed "a plan that he has been pushing steadily" and was in favor of containing the Bosnia disaster. Lugar was of the view that the United States wanted a full partnership with Europeans that could only arise from "recognition on their side that our men and women in the armed forces are taking risks right now".

On November 20, 1993, Lugar voted in favor of the North American Free Trade Agreement. The trade agreement linked the United States, Canada, and Mexico into a single free trade zone, and was signed into law on December 8 by Clinton.

In December 1994, Clinton announced the nomination of Dan Glickman for Secretary of Agriculture. During the ceremony, Glickman stated that agriculture should not be immune to change and cited Lugar as an official "asking good questions about the next farm bill". During a March 1995 Senate hearing, Lugar indicated his distaste with Glickman not supporting the latest accord under the General Agreement on Tariffs and Trade the previous November. Lugar afterward spoke positively of Glickman.

On August 3, 1997, Lugar stated his support for convening a hearing for William Weld for United States Ambassador to Mexico and overlook Senator Jesse Helms, noting that a Senate chairman "cannot be dictatorial, ultimately, when a majority of the committee, a majority of the Senate, a majority of the American people, want action".

On February 12, 1999, Lugar voted in favor of both articles of impeachment against Clinton, calling his relationship with White House intern Monica Lewinsky "shameless, reckless, and indefensible", and criticizing him for creating a negative environment.

"Simply to be near him in the White House has meant not only tragic heartache for his wife and his daughter but enormous legal bills for staff members and friends who admired him and yearned for his success but who have been caught up in his incessant 'war room' strategies to maintain him in office."

In October 1999, Lugar voted against the Comprehensive Nuclear-Test-Ban Treaty. The treaty was designed to ban underground nuclear testing and was the first major international security pact to be defeated in the Senate since the Treaty of Versailles.

==== 2000–2008 ====
During the August recess of 2005, Lugar and then-freshman Senator Barack Obama of neighboring Illinois visited Russia, Azerbaijan, and Ukraine to inspect nuclear facilities there. He was detained for three hours at an airport in the city of Perm, near the Ural Mountains, where they were scheduled to depart for a meeting with the President and the Speaker of the House of Ukraine. He was released after a brief dialogue between U.S. and Russian officials and the Russians later apologized for the incident. In January 2007, President Bush signed into law the Lugar–Obama Proliferation and Threat Reduction Initiative, which furthered Lugar's work with Senator Sam Nunn in deactivating weapons in the former Soviet Union. The Lugar–Obama program focuses on terrorists and their use of multiple types of weapons. In April 2006, Time magazine selected Lugar as one of America's 10 Best Senators.

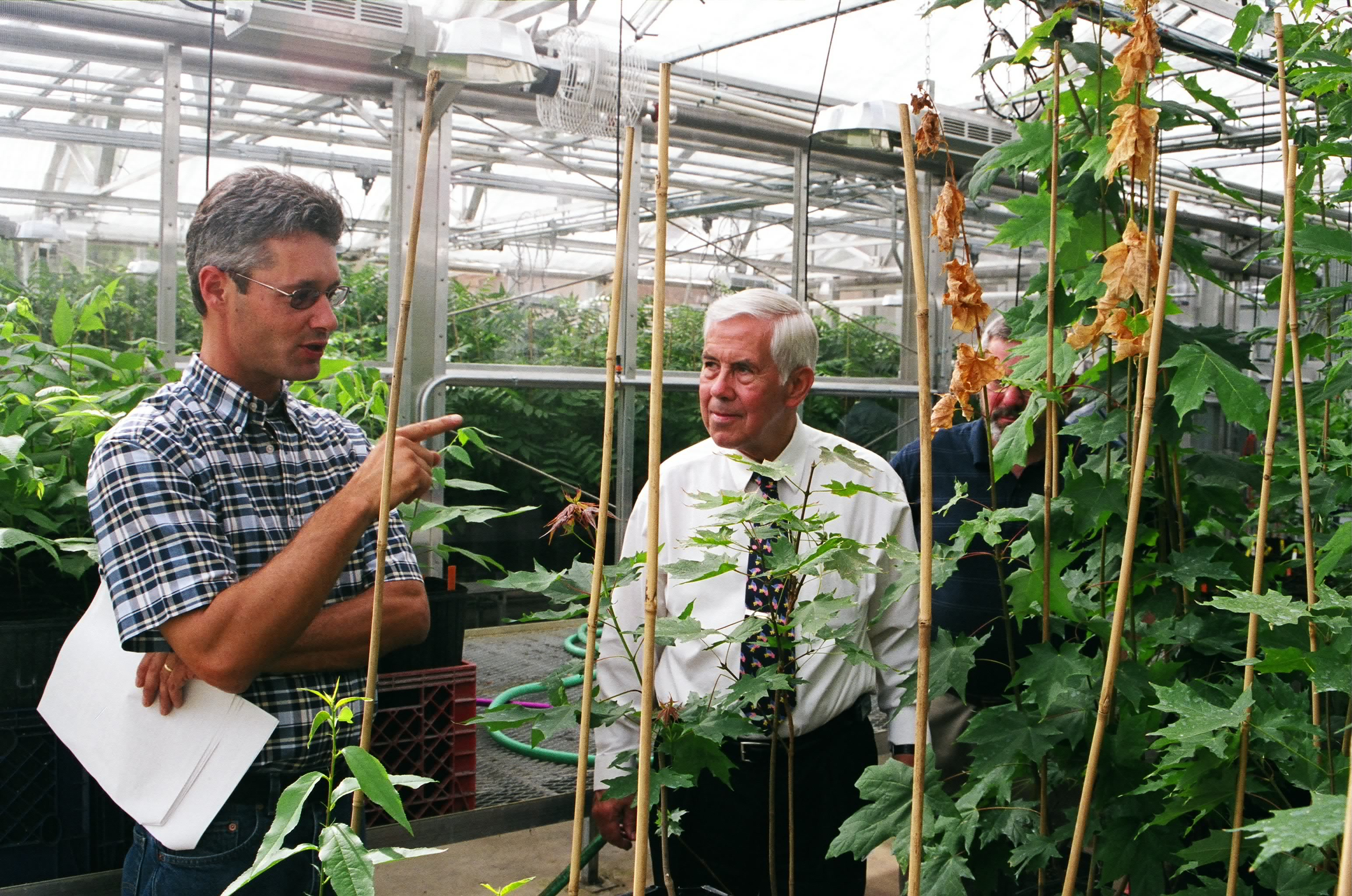
Senator Lugar tours an agricultural research facility.

Although Lugar's party was then in the minority in the Senate, he had good relationships with President Obama and Vice President Joe Biden. Lugar was named an honorary co-chairman of their inauguration. On the day of the final 2008 presidential debate, Lugar gave a speech at the National Defense University praising Obama's foreign policy approach and warning against the isolationist, reactive policies espoused by John McCain. At that debate, Obama also listed Lugar as among the individuals "who have shaped my ideas and who will be surrounding me in the White House". There were rumors that either Obama or McCain would select Lugar to be Secretary of State, but that he preferred to keep his Senate seat.

==== Obama administration ====
On January 13, 2009, Lugar participated in the confirmation hearing for Secretary of State nominee Hillary Clinton, raising questions on the potential conflict of interest between her husband Bill's charitable activities and her new position. Lugar offered praise to Clinton as "the epitome of a big leaguer". Lugar's spokesman Andy Fisher said that before the hearing, Lugar offered Clinton's staff four ways in which to increase the transparency of former President Clinton's fundraising.

On March 18, 2009, Lugar cast his 12,000th Senate vote, putting him in 13th place for most votes. During his 32 years as a Senator, he had a 98% attendance record.

=== Committee assignments ===
- Committee on Agriculture, Nutrition, and Forestry
- Committee on Foreign Relations

== 1996 presidential campaign ==
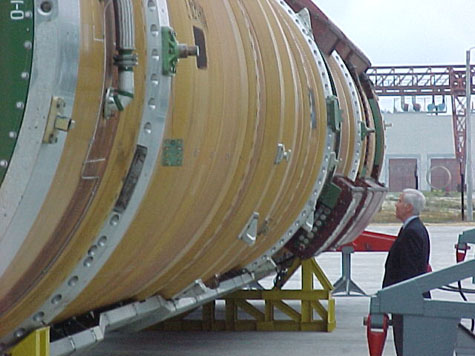
Richard Lugar inspects an SS-18 ICBM being prepared for destruction under the Nunn–Lugar cooperative threat reduction program.

Lugar ran for the Republican nomination for President in 1996. He declared his candidacy on April 19, 1995, in Indianapolis. However, the announcement was overshadowed by the Oklahoma City bombing, an event the same day that was the most deadly act of domestic terrorism on U.S. soil to date.

Caucuses and primaries began in January 1996. He ran on a campaign slogan of "nuclear security and fiscal sanity", but his campaign failed to gain traction. He came in 7th in the Iowa caucuses on February 12 with 4%, and 4th in the New Hampshire primary on February 20 with 5%. In the Delaware primary on February 24 he also won 5%, and in the Arizona and North Dakota primaries on February 27 he came in last with 1%. He was on the ballot in seven of the nine contests on Super Tuesday on March 5, winning 1% in Colorado, Connecticut, and Maryland, 2% in Massachusetts, 3% in Maine and Rhode Island and 14% in Vermont, which was the best result he managed, though he still only came in 4th.

Lugar quit the race the next day, March 6. His fellow senator and eventual Republican nominee Bob Dole won all nine contests and Lugar endorsed him.

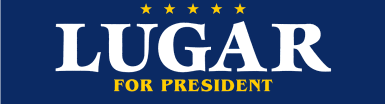
Lugar's presidential campaign logo

Lugar remained on the ballot in a number of states because of legal timing restrictions, winning 2% of the vote in Florida, then 1% each in Oregon, Illinois, Ohio, and California, 5% in Pennsylvania, and 1% in North Carolina and West Virginia. He finished sixth overall, with 127,111 votes, or 0.83%, and failed to win any contests or delegates. Due to an unfavorable political climate that penalized bipartisan outcomes, David Corn of Mother Jones called his presidential campaign "ludicrous".

== Post-Senate career ==
On February 15, 2018, Lugar made a joint appearance with Lee H. Hamilton at DePauw University for the program "Can We Talk?: Restoring Civility in Public and Political Discourse in the U.S. and Abroad".

=== The Lugar Center ===
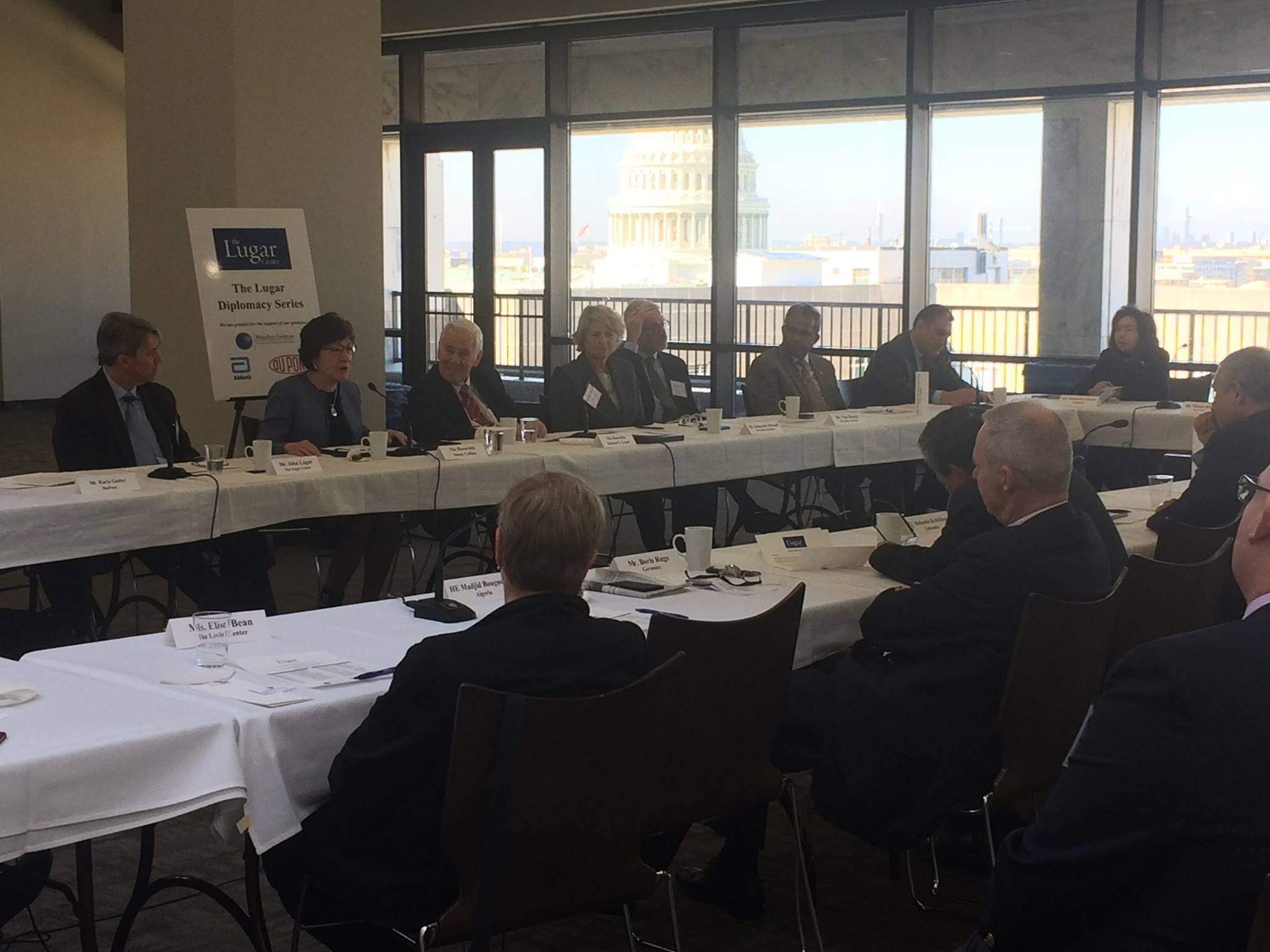
Sen. Susan Collins at an event facilitated by the Lugar Center

Following his service in the Senate, Lugar established the Lugar Center, a nonprofit public policy institution located in Washington, D.C.

Under the leadership of Lugar, the Lugar Center seeks to become a prominent voice in many of the global issues that defined the Senator's work in Congress. There are four "focus areas": Global Food Security, WMD Nonproliferation, Foreign Aid Effectiveness, and Bipartisan Governance. Since its inception in January 2013, the Lugar Center has served as a source of education and awareness on these pertinent issues.

Logo of The Lugar Center

The center's initiatives include the following: working in conjunction with the McCourt School of Public Policy at Georgetown University to establish the Bipartisan Index, partnering with the Arms Control Association to establish the Bipartisan Nuclear and WMD Policy Dialogue Project, and compiling a comprehensive selection of bibliographical resources for researchers and policymakers interested in global food security. In addition, the Lugar Diplomacy Series brings together American policy- and opinion-makers and the Washington diplomatic community. Guests have included Elena Kagan, David Petraeus, and Howard Buffett.

In addition, the Lugar Center was awarded a grant by the Delegation of the European Union to conduct policy research regarding transatlantic cooperation. The grant permitted the center to partner with the German Marshall Fund of the United States to work on bolstering trans-Atlantic energy security and economic cooperation, particularly in relation to the Trans-Atlantic Trade and Investment Partnership.

== Political positions ==
=== Abortion ===
Lugar's 2007 rating from NARAL was 40%. His 2007–2008 rating from the National Right to Life Committee was 85%.

=== Agricultural reform ===
As Chairman of the Agriculture Committee, Lugar built bipartisan support for 1996 federal farm program reforms, ending 1930s-era federal production controls. He worked to initiate a biofuels research program to help increase U.S. utilization of ethanol and combustion fuels, and led initiatives to streamline the U.S. Department of Agriculture, reform the food stamp program, and preserve the federal school lunch program.

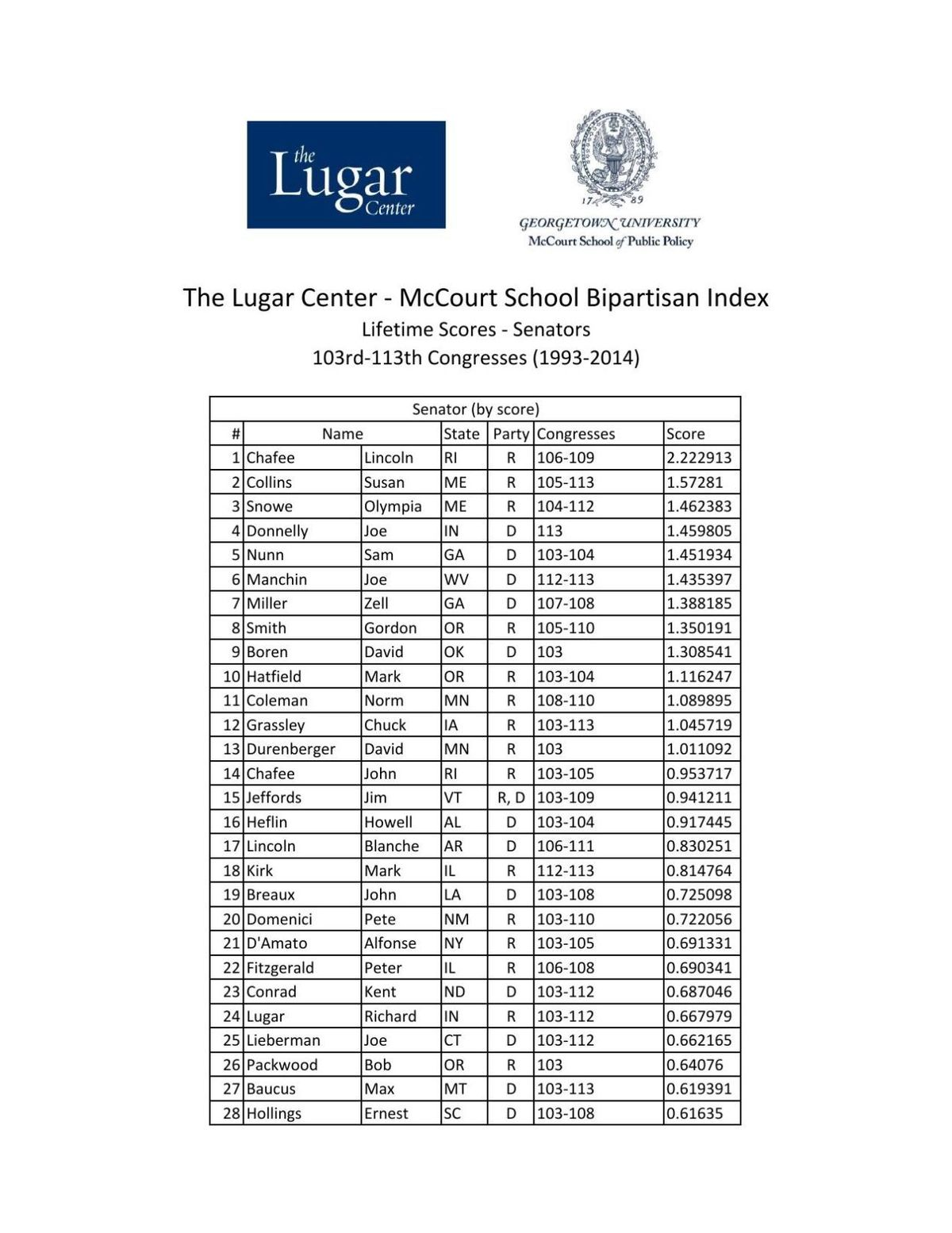
A sample from the Lugar Bipartisan Index, compiled by the Lugar Center

=== Bipartisan governance ===
Although Republican, Lugar often worked across the aisle, working alongside Democrats on many initiatives. For this reason, he commonly broke with traditional Republican lines, especially on non-domestic issues. Lugar's most well-known piece of legislation, the Nunn–Lugar Cooperative Threat Reduction Agreement, was co-sponsored with Sam Nunn, a Democratic Senator from Georgia. Lugar's bipartisan efforts earned him 24th place of 227 Senators' lifetime scores from 1993 to 2014 according to the Lugar Bipartisan Index, with a score of .668. Lugar continued to support bipartisan solutions and initiatives as one of the policy focus areas of The Lugar Center.

=== Climate change ===
Lugar was a firm believer in pragmatic, scientific solutions to climate change issues. In 2006, he co-sponsored Senate Resolution 312 with then-Senator Joe Biden, which encouraged American participation in international negotiations regarding mitigation agreements. Until his death, he continued to support multilateral initiatives for the deployment of innovative clean technology around the world.

=== Cuba ===
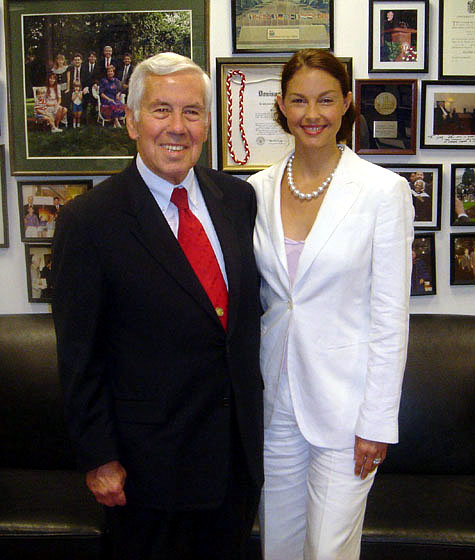
Richard Lugar meeting with actress Ashley Judd in 2005

Lugar described U.S. sanctions on Cuba as a failed policy and wrote to President Obama that "additional measures are needed...to recast a policy that has not only failed to promote human rights and democracy, but also undermines our broader security and political interests". He supported the Freedom to Travel to Cuba Act (S.428), which would lift the restrictions on U.S. citizens visiting Cuba in place since the early 1960s.

=== Economy ===
Lugar took a conservative approach to economics. He voted for the Economic Growth and Tax Relief Reconciliation Act of 2001. He voted against the American Recovery and Reinvestment Act of 2009.

=== Gun control ===
Lugar was a supporter of gun control and backed a number of gun legislations and weapons bans. He had an F grade from the NRA Political Victory Fund. He had an F grade from Gun Owners of America and a 53% positive rating from the Brady Campaign to Prevent Handgun Violence.

=== Health care reform ===
Lugar opposed President Obama's health reform legislation, voted against the Affordable Care Act in December 2009, and voted against the Health Care and Education Reconciliation Act of 2010.

=== Immigration ===
Lugar had a generally liberal stance on immigration, supporting the DREAM Act during the Obama administration and the McCain–Kennedy Comprehensive Immigration Reform bill under the Bush administration, both of which died in Congress. Both were described by critics as "amnesty".

=== Iraq War ===
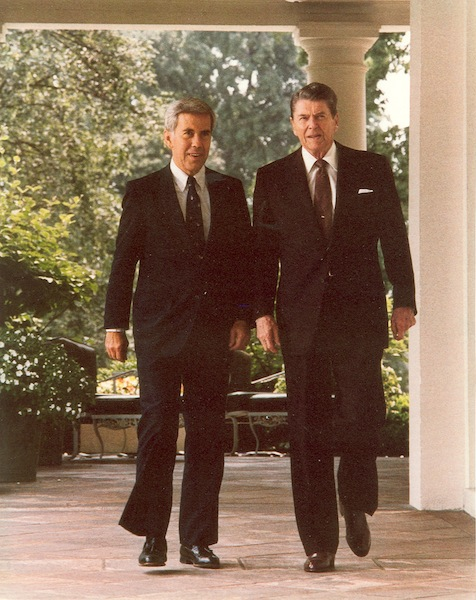
Richard Lugar and then-President Ronald Reagan, July 1981

On June 25, 2007, Lugar, who had been "a reliable vote for President Bush on the war", said that "Bush's Iraq strategy [is] not working and... the United States should downsize the military's role".

Lugar's blunt assessment has been viewed as significant because it showed the growing impatience and dissatisfaction with Bush's strategy in Iraq. After Lugar finished his remarks, Senate Majority Whip Richard Durbin (D-IL), a sharp critic of the war, praised Lugar's "thoughtful, sincere and honest" speech, which Durbin said was in the "finest tradition of the U.S. Senate". Durbin urged his Senate colleagues to take a copy of Lugar's speech home over the Fourth of July break and study it before returning to work. Senate Majority Leader Harry Reid said, in reaction to Lugar's speech: "When this war comes to an end, and it will come to an end, and the history books are written, and they will be written, I believe that Sen. Lugar's words yesterday could be remembered as a turning point in this intractable civil war in Iraq."

Two days later, on June 27, 2007, Lugar said that Congressional measures aimed at curtailing U.S. military involvement in Iraq – including "so-called timetables, benchmarks" – have "no particular legal consequence", are "very partisan", and "will not work".

=== Judicial nominees ===
Lugar believed that judicial confirmation decisions should not be purely partisan. His view was that if an appointee is properly qualified for the position, the Senate should show deference to the president and confirm the nomination.

Lugar introduced President George W. Bush's nominee for chief justice, John Roberts, to the Senate at the beginning of Roberts's confirmation process and was instrumental in securing votes to confirm Roberts to the Supreme Court. Lugar was among the few Republican senators to support President Barack Obama's first Supreme Court nominee United States Circuit Court of Appeals, Judge Sonia Sotomayor, and also voted in favor of his second Supreme Court nominee, Solicitor General Elena Kagan. Lugar was one of only nine senators to vote against Bill Clinton's nomination of Stephen Breyer to the Supreme Court. Lugar was the first United States Senator to declare their opposition to Breyer's nomination, citing, "substantial doubts about his prudence and good judgement." This was the only one of the thirteen Supreme Court confirmation votes which took place during Lugar's tenure in which he cast a vote against the nomination.

=== LGBT issues ===
Lugar held a socially conservative approach on LGBT issues. He voted for the Federal Marriage Amendment, limiting the definition of marriage to one man and one woman. However, he also voted in favor of the Matthew Shepard Act, which expanded the federal hate crime statutes to include sexual orientation and gender identity. In October 2010, Lugar voted against repeal of the Don't Ask, Don't Tell policy—which prevented gays and lesbians from serving openly in the armed forces. Although Senator Joe Lieberman of Connecticut announced on November 18, 2010, that Lugar promised to vote to repeal the policy the next time it comes up for a vote, Lugar voted against DADT repeal in both the cloture and final votes on December 18, 2010.

=== Middle East ===
In a television interview on September 11, 1983, amid President Reagan not defining the penalties for American casualties in the Middle East, Lugar stated the US position in Lebanon was "clearly defensive", but concurred that issue was debatable.

On May 6, 1986, Lugar was among 22 senators to vote in favor of the Reagan administration-backed proposed arms sale to Saudi Arabia, warning other senators prior to voting that they "were taking a headlong plunge in opposition to the President of the United States". Lugar and fellow Senator Bob Dole, both of whom supported the arms sale proposal, stated that Reagan would be crippled in his role in the Middle East peace settlement in the event that he was unable to deliver a reduced arms package to the moderate Arab state.

On August 7, 2012, Lugar called for the United States and Russia to work in collaboration to eliminate the stockpile of chemical weapons in Syria during an interview. He noted that the proposal had been turned down by Russian officials, who noted Syria had not previously supported the Chemical Weapons Convention, and that other countries saw the stockpile of Syrian weapons as "influencing very adversely the potential for peace and stability in the Middle East".

=== Nuclear stockpile ===
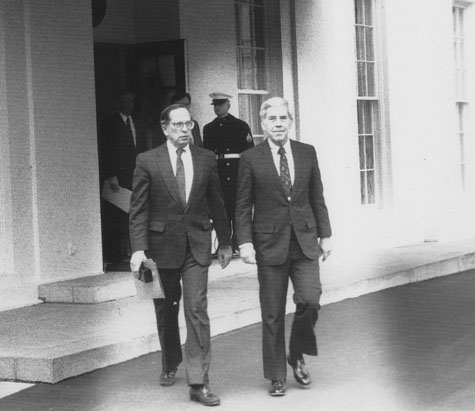
Senators Sam Nunn and Lugar leaving the White House in 1991 after briefing President George H. W. Bush on the Nunn–Lugar legislation

Lugar was influential in gaining Senate ratification of treaties to reduce the world's use, production and stockpiling of nuclear, chemical, and biological weapons, and spearheaded many bipartisan nonproliferation initiatives. In 1991, he initiated a partnership with then-Senate Armed Services Committee Chairman Sam Nunn aiming to eliminate latent weapons of mass destruction in the former Soviet Union. By 2003, the Nunn–Lugar Cooperative Threat Reduction program has deactivated more than 6,000 nuclear warheads. In 2004, Lugar and Nunn were jointly awarded the Heinz Awards Chairman's Medal for their efforts. He was an integral figure in the passing of the New START Treaty (which passed 71–26).

=== Pakistan ===
In October 2008, Lugar and Joe Biden, his partner in the Committee on Foreign Relations, received the Hilal-i-Pakistan (Crescent of Pakistan) Award from the government of Pakistan for their continued support of the country. In July 2008 Lugar and Biden introduced a plan that would give $1.5 billion in aid per year to support economic development in Pakistan.

=== Other international policy achievements ===
Senator Lugar supported Nelson Mandela's fight against South African apartheid. When President Reagan vetoed economic sanctions against South African leaders as a punitive measure for apartheid, Lugar turned against his own party and led the charge to overrule the veto successfully with bipartisan support. As Chair of the Senate Foreign Relations Committee, he declared on the Senate floor, "We are against tyranny, and there is tyranny in South Africa."

Lugar was also instrumental to the fall of the dictatorial Marcos regime in the Philippines, closely observing its 1986 "snap" presidential election and denouncing Marcos as having stolen the election from candidate Corazon Aquino.

In addition, Lugar coauthored the Cardin–Lugar Amendment to the Dodd–Frank Act, which required all U.S.-listed oil and mining companies to report their payments to governments. Nearly identical pro-transparency measures, aimed at curbing natural resource-related corruption in the developing world, were subsequently adopted by the European Union and Canada, making extractive industry payment disclosure a global standard.

=== Views on Trump administration ===
In a November 2017 interview, Lugar stated that President Donald Trump had not "demonstrated civility in his leadership" and that his usage of Twitter and "other bombastic avenues" were not solving issues.

== Electoral history ==
Indianapolis mayoral election, 1967
Party	Candidate	Votes	%
Republican	Richard Lugar	72,278	53.3
Democratic	John J. Barton (incumbent)	63,284	46.7

Indianapolis mayoral election, 1971
Party	Candidate	Votes	%
Republican	Richard Lugar	155,164	60.5
Democratic	John Neff	101,367	39.5

U.S. Senator of Indiana (Class 3), 1974
Party	Candidate	Votes	%
Democratic	Birch Bayh (incumbent)	889,269	50.7
Republican	Richard Lugar	814,117	46.4
American	Don L Lee	49,592	2.8

U.S. Senator of Indiana (Class 1), 1976
Party	Candidate	Votes	%
Republican	Richard Lugar	1,273,833	59.0
Democratic	Vance Hartke (incumbent)	868,522	40.2
Independent	Don L Lee	14,321	0.7
U.S. Labor	David Lee Hoagland	2,511	0.1

U.S. Senator of Indiana (Class 1), 1982
Party	Candidate	Votes	%
Republican	Richard Lugar (incumbent)	978,301	53.8
Democratic	Floyd Fithian	828,400	45.6
American	Raymond James	10,586	0.6

U.S. Senator of Indiana (Class 1), 1988
Party	Candidate	Votes	%
Republican	Richard Lugar (incumbent)	1,430,525	68.1
Democratic	Jack Wickes	668,778	31.9

U.S. Senator of Indiana (Class 1), 1994
Party	Candidate	Votes	%
Republican	Richard Lugar (incumbent)	1,039,625	67.4
Democratic	Jim Jontz	470,799	30.5
Libertarian	Barbara Bourland	17,343	1.1
New Alliance	Mary Catherine Barton	15,801	1.0

U.S. Senator of Indiana (Class 1), 2000
Party	Candidate	Votes	%
Republican	Richard Lugar (incumbent)	1,427,944	66.6
Democratic	David L. Johnson	683,273	31.9
Libertarian	Paul Hager	33,992	1.6

U.S. Senator of Indiana (Class 1), 2006
Party	Candidate	Votes	%
Republican	Richard Lugar (incumbent)	1,171,553	87.4
Libertarian	Steve Osborn	168,820	12.6
Independent	Mark Pool (write in)	444	0.0
Independent	John H. Baldwin (write in)	294	0.0

Republican US Senate Primary, 2012
Party	Candidate	Votes	%
Republican	Richard Mourdock	400,321	60.5
Republican	Richard Lugar (incumbent)	261,285	39.5

== Awards and honors ==
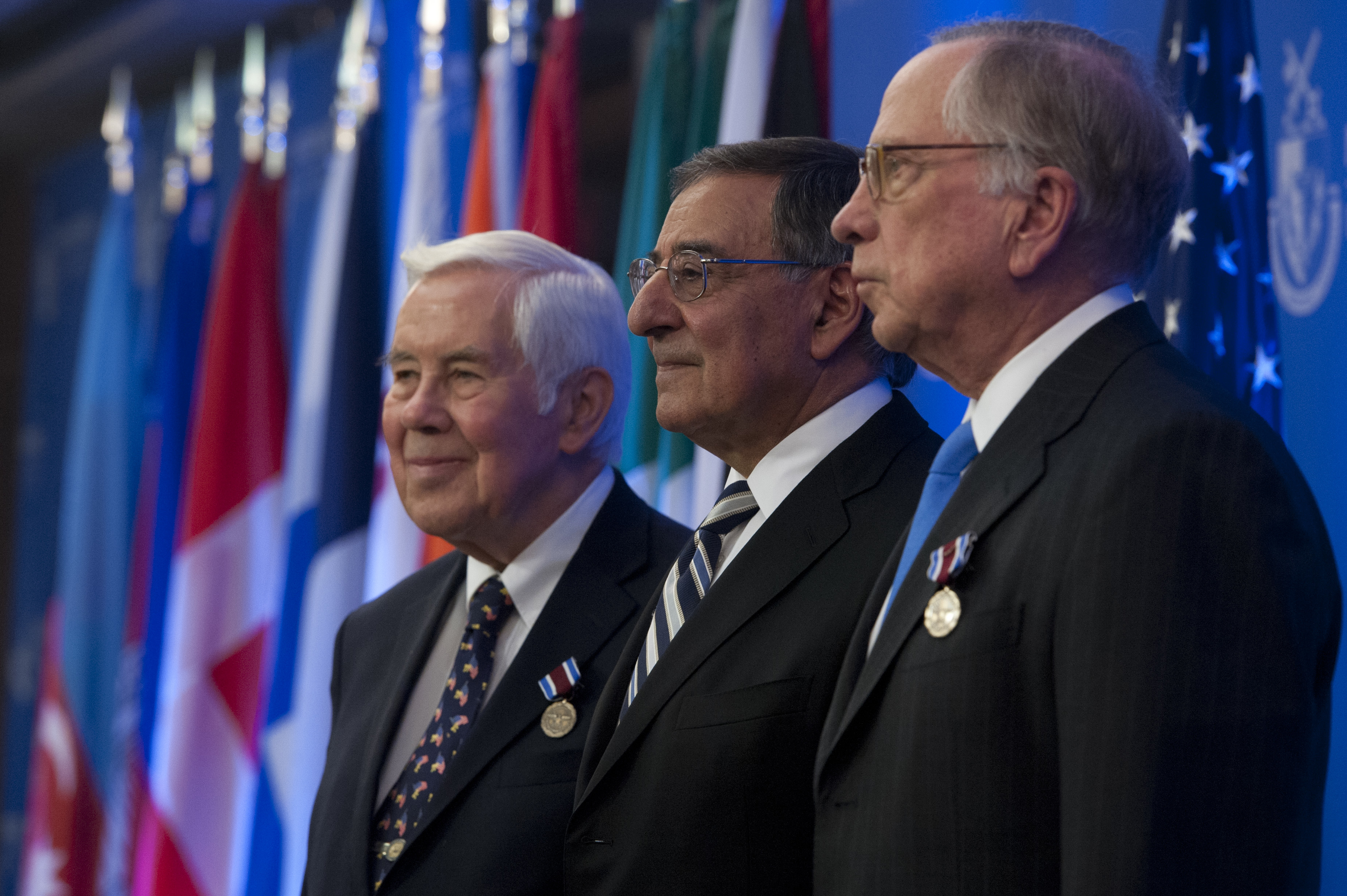
Lugar, left, Secretary of Defense Leon E. Panetta, center, and former Georgia Sen. Sam Nunn receive recognition for their bipartisan work regarding nuclear nonproliferation, December 2012

Lugar received numerous awards, including Guardian of Small Business, the Spirit of Enterprise, Watchdog of the Treasury, and 46 honorary doctorate degrees. In 1970, he received the Golden Plate Award of the American Academy of Achievement. In 2001, Lugar received the Democracy Service Medal of the National Endowment for Democracy. In 2010, Lugar received the Benjamin Harrison Presidential Site Advancing American Democracy Award. In June 2012, he was conferred with the Grand Collar of the Order of Lakandula by President Benigno S. Aquino III for his contributions to the enhancement of the Philippine-US alliance and friendship as well as Poland's Knight of Freedom Award for his actions and support of the Polish accession process to NATO structures.

On August 8, 2013, President Obama named Lugar as a recipient of the Presidential Medal of Freedom. The award ceremony was held November 20 of that year, the 50th anniversary of the assassination of John F. Kennedy. The citation in the press release read as follows:

"Richard Lugar represented Indiana in the United States Senate for more than 30 years. An internationally respected statesman, he is best known for his bipartisan leadership and decades-long commitment to reducing the threat of nuclear weapons. Prior to serving in Congress, Lugar was a Rhodes Scholar and Mayor of Indianapolis from 1968 to 1975. He currently serves as President of the Lugar Center."

Lugar was knighted as a Knight Commander of the Order of the British Empire (KBE) for his efforts to reduce Weapons of Mass Destruction and supporting NATO. Lugar was awarded the Grand Cross of the Order of Merit, from Germany, in 2013, for his work on fostering transatlantic cooperation. In 2014, Lugar received the Golden Laurel Branch award, the highest honor given by the Bulgarian Ministry of Foreign Affairs. Lugar was recognized for his contributions to Bulgaria's accession to NATO.

In August 2016, President Petro Poroshenko of Ukraine awarded Richard Lugar with the highest award for foreigners — Order of Liberty. In November 2016 he was awarded the 2016 J. William Fulbright Prize for International Understanding. In 2005, Lugar was presented the Lifetime Contributions to American Diplomacy Award by the American Foreign Service Association.

== Other outside activities ==
Lugar was a member the Indiana Society of the Sons of the American Revolution, as well as a member of the Society of Indiana Pioneers, based on his descent from very early settlers in the state. He joined the Rotary Club of Indianapolis in 1957 and spoke at the club annually during his time in the U.S. Senate. He remained an active Rotarian. On February 16, 2013, Lugar was named the Rotarian of the Century. He served on the board of directors of the National Endowment for Democracy from 1992 to 2001.

Lugar was a member of the board of the International Foundation for Electoral Systems, an organization involved in international elections. He was a member of the board of the Nuclear Threat Initiative (NTI). Lugar was on the Board of Selectors of the Jefferson Awards for Public Service.

== Richard G. Lugar Center for Public Health Research ==
A biological research facility in Tbilisi, Georgia, is named after Lugar in honor of his efforts to reduce nuclear, chemical, and biological weapons around the world. The Richard G. Lugar Center for Public Health Research is a biological research facility funded by the U.S. Defense Threat Reduction Agency (DTRA) to contain and house dangerous pathogens and support international research efforts. It and other upgraded bio-threat reduction facilities in the region are designed to stop diseases like plague and African swine fever from spreading globally.

Lugar, utilizing the Nunn–Lugar Cooperative Threat Reduction Program (CTR) which helped former Soviet Union states dismantle weapons of mass destruction after the Cold War, worked with the country of Georgia on biosafety, biosecurity and biosurveillance efforts through CTR's Cooperative Biological Engagement Program (CBEP). The main goal was to improve the biosafety, biosecurity, disease surveillance, and establish the Central Public Health Reference Laboratory.

In 2012, Georgian authorities renamed the facility the Richard G. Lugar Center for Public Health Research; it belongs to and is run by the Georgian National Center for Disease Control and Public Health (NCDC). In 2014, then-U.S. Ambassador to Georgia at the time, Richard Norland, signed an agreement with then-Georgian Prime Minister Irakli Garibashvili to transfer custody of the center to the NCDC during the 2014 World Congress on Chemical, Biological, Radiological and Nuclear Science & Consequence Management. At the invitation of the Georgian government, a contingent of U.S. scientists from the U.S. Centers for Disease Control and Prevention (CDC) Global Disease Detection Program, and the U.S. Walter Reed Army Institute of Research are co-located in the facility. They work collaboratively alongside their Georgian counterparts.

== Personal life and death ==
Lugar married Charlene Smeltzer on September 8, 1956. The couple had four sons. He was a member of the United Methodist Church.

Lugar died in Falls Church, Virginia, on April 28, 2019, shortly after his 87th birthday, from complications of chronic inflammatory demyelinating polyneuropathy. He is buried in Arlington National Cemetery.

== Legacy ==
John T. Shaw assessed the Nunn–Lugar Cooperative Threat Reduction as Lugar's landmark legislative accomplishment. The initiative would later be considered "one of the most prescient pieces of legislation ever passed, and the most important nonproliferation program ever".

In 2000, Eric Schmitt described Lugar as "a four-term senator, former presidential candidate and perhaps the most popular politician in Indiana history". Following Lugar's 2012 Senate loss, Peter Rusthoven stated, "Historically, this is not just one of the great senators now. This is one of the great senators in United States history. He is like a Daniel Webster, he is like a Henry Clay—names that I fear too many of our kids in grade school and high school don't even know anymore."

Lugar's defeat in the 2012 Senate Republican primary was written of as a sign of the national GOP base's escalation into strict support for the traditional views aligned with the right. Former Senator John Danforth said the loss told him "that there is an attempt by a lot of people to purge the Republican Party and to kick out of it people who do not hue a very strict party line". Geoffrey Kabaservice cast doubts on this view: "It may be that his bipartisanship and comparative moderation contributed to his loss, or his defeat may simply have reflected the political truism that young blood drives out the old. What's certain is that the Senate will miss his qualities, and in time so may we all."

On November 18, 2019, Secretary of the Navy Richard V. Spencer announced that the Arleigh Burke-class guided missile destroyer USS Richard G. Lugar (DDG-136) would be named in the late senator's honor.

In Indianapolis, the plaza in front of the City-County Building is named Lugar Plaza and contains a statue of Lugar by Ryan Feeney. A public housing apartment building in the city is also named in his honor. On the campus of Indiana University in Bloomington, the School of Global and International Studies was renamed as Hamilton Lugar School of Global and International Studies to honor Lugar and former U.S. Congressman Lee Hamilton.

Political offices
Preceded by John Barton	Mayor of Indianapolis; 1968–1976	Succeeded by William Hudnut
Party political offices
Preceded by William Ruckelshaus	Republican nominee for U.S. Senator from Indiana (Class 3); 1974	Succeeded by Dan Quayle
Preceded by Richard Roudebush	Republican nominee for U.S. Senator from Indiana (Class 1); 1976, 1982, 1988, 1994, 2000, 2006	Succeeded by Richard Mourdock
Preceded by Bob Packwood	Chair of the National Republican Senatorial Committee; 1983–1985	Succeeded by John Heinz
U.S. Senate
Preceded by Vance Hartke	U.S. Senator (Class 1) from Indiana; 1977–2013; Served alongside: Birch Bayh, Dan Quayle, Dan Coats, Evan Bayh, Dan Coats	Succeeded by Joe Donnelly
Preceded by Chuck Percy	Chair of the Senate Foreign Relations Committee; 1985–1987	Succeeded by Claiborne Pell
Preceded by Jesse Helms	Ranking Member of the Senate Agriculture Committee; 1987–1995	Succeeded by Patrick Leahy
Preceded by Patrick Leahy	Chair of the Senate Agriculture Committee; 1995–2001	Succeeded by Tom Harkin
Preceded by Tom Harkin	Chair of the Senate Agriculture Committee; 2001	Succeeded by Tom Harkin
Preceded by Tom Harkin	Ranking Member of the Senate Agriculture Committee; 2001, 2001–2003	Succeeded by Tom Harkin
Preceded by Joe Biden	Chair of the Senate Foreign Relations Committee; 2003–2007	Succeeded by Joe Biden
Preceded by Joe Biden	Ranking Member of the Senate Foreign Relations Committee; 2007–2013	Succeeded by Bob Corker
Honorary titles
Preceded by Ted Stevens	Most senior Republican United States senator 2009–2013	Succeeded by Orrin Hatch
