= 1963 Indianapolis mayoral election =

Indianapolis mayoral election, 1963
- November 5, 1963
- Turnout: 47.9%
Nominee	John J. Barton	Clarence Drayer	Samuel Unger
Party	Democratic	Republican	Independent
Popular vote	68,316	63,091	10,709
Percentage	48.1%	44.4%	7.5%
Mayor before election
Albert H. Losche
Democratic
Elected mayor
John J. Barton
Democratic

The Indianapolis mayoral election of 1963 took place on November 5, 1963, and saw the election of John J. Barton.

Barton won a hotly contested Democratic primary. Barton defeated Republican Clarence Drayer and independent candidate Samuel Unger in the general election.

Barton's campaign platform promised to reform the Indianapolis Police Department, involve the community in decision making, seek federal assistance for Indianapolis whenever possible, practice slum clearance, and make infrastructure repairs.

This was the last time a Democrat was elected Mayor of Indianapolis until 1999.

== Results ==
Indianapolis mayoral election, 1963
Party	Candidate	Votes	%
Democratic	John J. Barton	68,316	48.1
Republican	Clarence Drayer	63,091	44.4
Independent	Samuel Unger	10,709	7.5
Turnout		142,116	47.9
Majority		5,225	3.7
Democratic hold			

Voter turnout saw then-record levels.

Preceded by 1959	Indianapolis mayoral election 1963	Succeeded by 1967
