= 1967 Indianapolis mayoral election =

Indianapolis mayoral election, 1967
- November 7, 1967
- Turnout: 45.2%
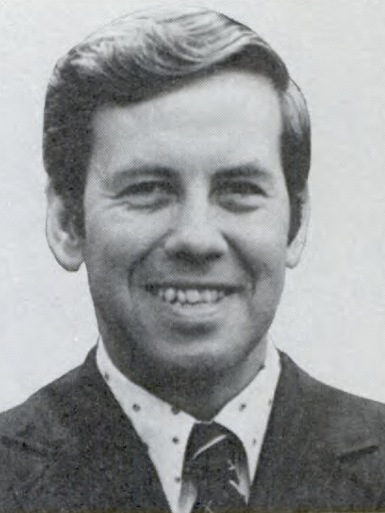

Nominee	Richard Lugar	John J. Barton
Party	Republican	Democratic
Popular vote	72,278	63,284
Percentage	53.3%	46.7%
Mayor before election
John J. Barton
Democratic
Elected mayor
Richard Lugar
Republican

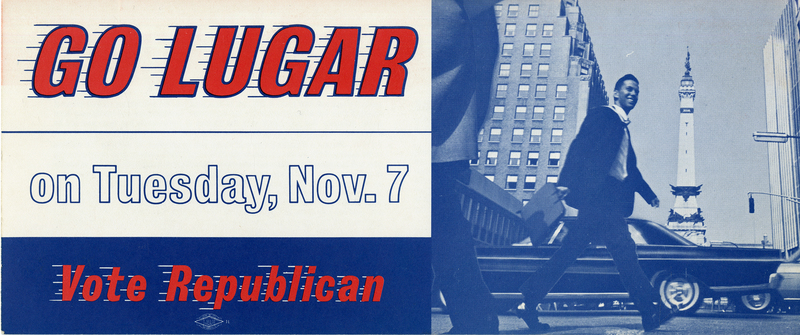
Postcard from Lugar's campaign

The Indianapolis mayoral election of 1967 took place on November 7, 1967. Richard Lugar defeated incumbent Democratic mayor John J. Barton, becoming the first Republican to be elected mayor of Indianapolis in nearly two-decades. Democrats had long dominated mayoral elections before 1967, having won ten of the thirteen mayoral elections since 1930. No Democrat would subsequently recapture the mayoralty until 1999, largely due to the city-county merger that created the Unigov in 1970 adding the votes of suburban Marion County, which shifted the composition of the electorate towards the Republicans.

== Nominations ==
=== Democratic primary ===
Barton was unsuccessfully challenged by Marion County Democratic Party chairman James W. Beatty. Beatty's challenge to Barton was seen as an act of retribution for Barton seeking to unseat Beatty as chairman the previous year.

=== Republican primary ===
A former member of the Indianapolis School Board, earlier that year Lugar had unsuccessfully sought to become President of the but lost by a vote of four to three. Lugar was also the former head of Community Action Against Poverty and an executive at Thomas I. Green & Co. After this, he was convinced by L. Keith Bulen, the chair of the Marion County Republican Committee, to run for mayor. Lugar was also supported by the Republican Action Committee, a group of young Republicans that had organized after the party's losses in the 1964 election cycle in order to challenge control of the party from the party establishment.

In the primary, Lugar defeated former mayor Alex M. Clark.

== General election ==
Lugar made roughly 400 speeches over the course of his candidacy, discussing a wide variety of issues rather than focusing narrowly on a handful of issues. Among effective criticisms he lodged against Barton was criticism of the practice of open-dump burning of refuse (including in wards that had historically been strongly Democratic). He also spoke on issues such as the construction of the highway inner loop, minority demands, and a lack of adequate recreation space.

Barton had been a fairly popular incumbent. By the end of the election cycle, it had been widely anticipated that he would be reelected by a narrow margin. Lugar's win was considered to be a political upset.

Coinciding municipal elections were also swept by the Republican Party. Republicans took the city council elections with a 6 to 3 majority of seats.

Indianapolis mayoral election, 1967
Party	Candidate	Votes	%
Republican	Richard Lugar	72,278	53.3
Democratic	John J. Barton (incumbent)	63,284	46.7
Turnout		135,562	45.2
Majority		8,994	6.6
Republican gain from Democratic			

== See also ==
- Electoral history of Richard Lugar

Preceded by 1963	Indianapolis mayoral election 1967	Succeeded by 1971
