= National Center for Disease Control and Public Health =

Georgian government health agency

National Center for Disease Control and Public Health (Georgian: დაავადებათა კონტროლისა და საზოგადოებრივი ჯანმრთელობის ეროვნული ცენტრი) is a national agency of the country of Georgia, under the Ministry of Labour, Health and Social Affairs. It is based in the capital Tbilisi. The NCDC is tasked with protecting the public's health against dangerous outbreaks of disease. Its headquarters lie on Asatiani Street in the Saburtalo district of the city, and the agency employs 440 people, 65% of whom have university degrees.

The NCDC's is assisted by a number of regional health stations around the country, which also conduct immunization and detection.

The responsibilities the NCDC is not only to carry out surveillance of communicable and non-communicable diseases, but also to investigate outbreaks of particular interest, one notable case being the outbreak of Tularemia in 2006.

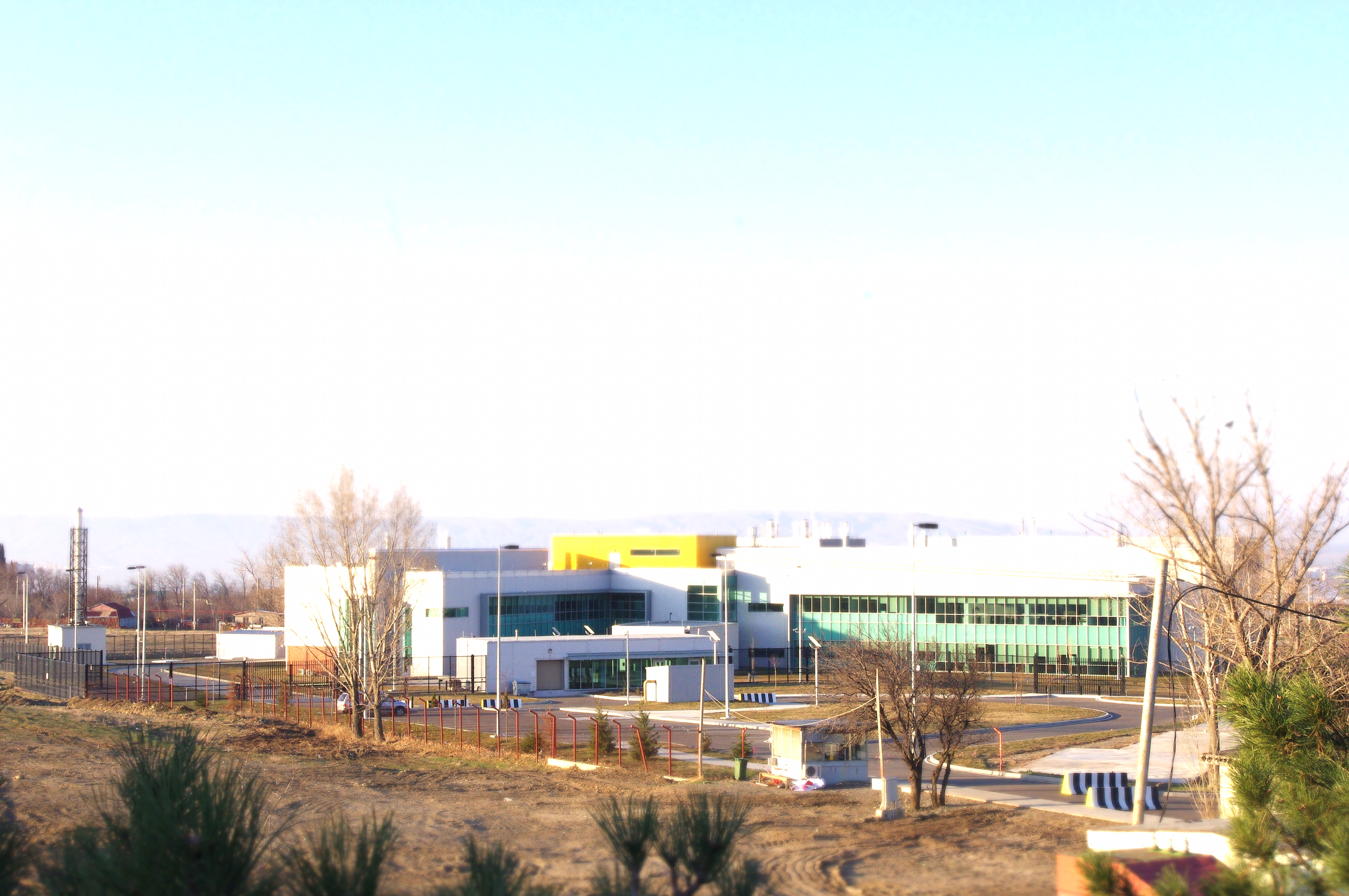

The NCDC also has responsibility for securing an extensive repository of live pathogens, which have been accumulated over the last century. This national reference laboratory used to be located in the top floor of the main building on Asatiani St, but was moved to a newly built facility in Alexeyevka, a suburb to Tbilisi a few kilometers from the Tbilisi International Airport. This Central Public Health Reference Laboratory was formally opened on 18 March 2011.

The new facility is a joint Georgia-USA project which complements existing facilities in Bangkok, Thailand and Nairobi, Kenya. It is part of Georgia's efforts to ensure biosecurity and biosafety.
