= Lugar Research Center =

Research center in Tbilisi, Georgia

Richard Lugar Center for Public Health Research
- ლუგარის კვლევითი ცენტრი
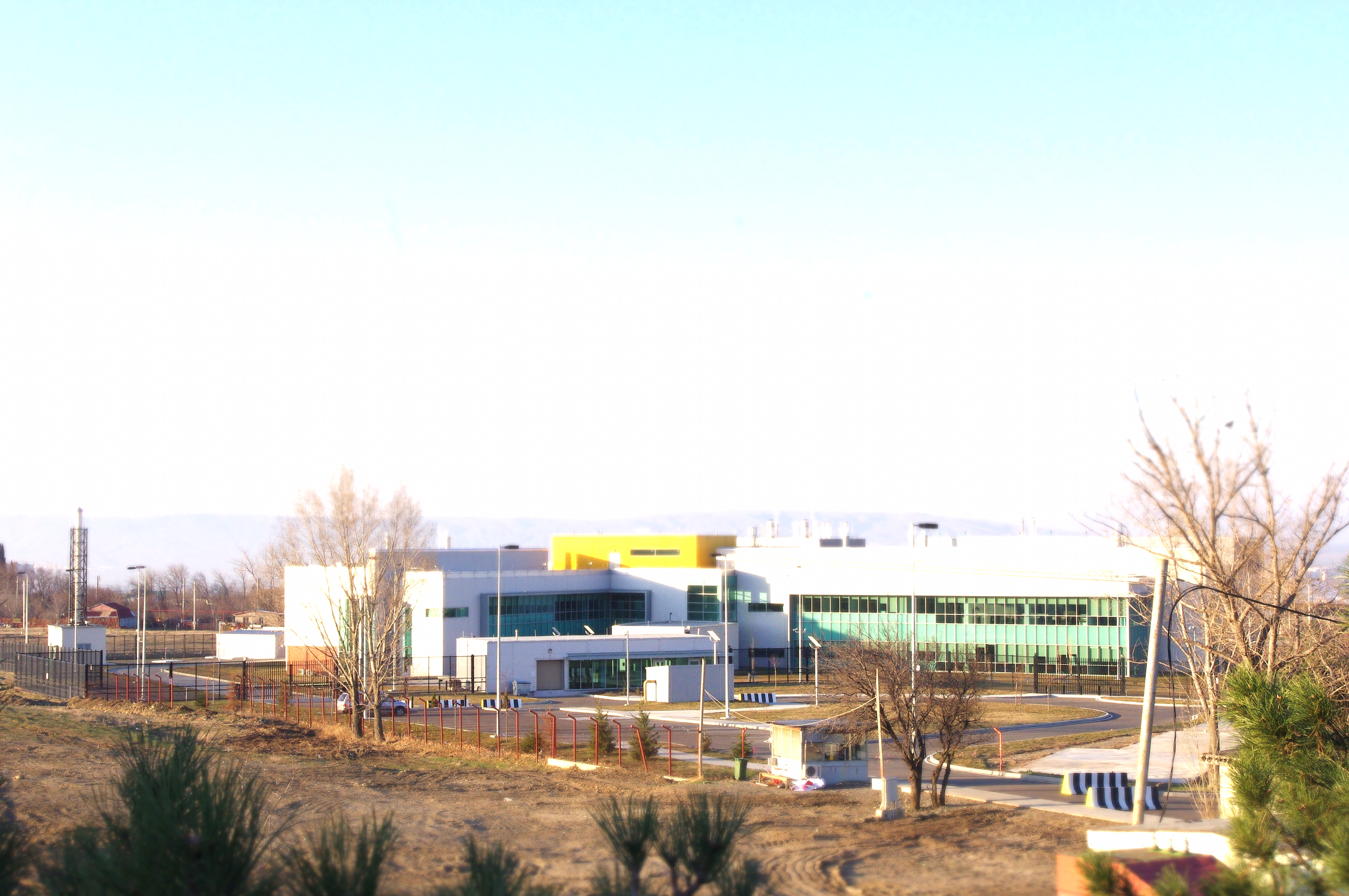
- Lugar Laboratory Building
- Established: 18 March 2011; 15 years ago
- Director: Paata Imnadze
- Location: Kakheti highway №99, Tbilisi, 0198, Georgia; 41.689444°N 44.944722°E
- Campus: 8000 m²
- Affiliations: Ministry of Health, Labour and Social Affairs of Georgia
- Operating agency: NCDC
- Location within Tbilisi

Richard Lugar Center for Public Health Research (LRC, Georgian: რიჩარდ ლუგარის სახელობის საზოგადოებრივი ჯანდაცვის კვლევითი ცენტრი) is a research center (laboratory) based on the National Center for Disease Control and Public Health, which was commissioned in 2011 and fully opened in August 2013. The LRC is the highest level of laboratory network in the country, representing the public health system referral library. The LRC is one of the best field of scientific biomedical and biosafety researches and preparation of students. The Center is accredited for graduate-level education, and has a BSL-3 facility.

== History ==
Since the Soviet period, there have been various biological laboratories in Georgia, such as "Anti-Black Death Georgian Station", which is located in Saburtalo district of Tbilisi, and is now the "National Center for Disease Control and Public Health", since 1937 the Soviets worked on dangerous pathogens.

The construction of the current center was launched in 2004, after the US Government and the Government of Georgia signed a MOU between the DTRA and the Ministry of Defense of Georgia. The full name of the Agreement was "Cooperation in the field of prevention of the introduction of pathogenesis and experience related to biological weapons development". The US government did not want the Soviet period scientists working on the biological weapons, in case the knowledge would get to such countries of the world as Iran or North Korea. Nobody wanted Georgia to be the source of biological weapons-related technologies or pathogens.

The LRC was opened in 2011, and it was fully operational from August 2013. The LRC is the highest level institution of laboratory network of country, which is a public health system referral laboratory.

The above-mentioned agreement has been implemented in the field of human and animal health and biosafety, by which in the last 13 years by the financial and technical assistance program, total cost of which is approximately 350 million USD in 2018. Within the framework of this program, the biosafety laboratory network equipped with modern equipments, and was designed to diagnose pathogens causing human and animal hazardous diseases.

Ownership of the LRC has since fully passed on to Government of Georgia, and since 2018 the Georgia provides full funding for the LRC and Laboratory Network. The Center played a key role as a diagnostic facility during the 2020 coronavirus pandemic in Georgia.

== Allegations ==
The LRC came to notice in 2017, when Russian authorities repeatedly alleged that the center was engaged in biological weapons development for the United States.

The US Department of State called these allegations ”groundless” and reaffirmed that “all U.S. activities (...) [were] consistent with the obligations set forth in the Biological Weapons Convention”. Biological weapons expert Filippa Lentzos agreed that the Russian allegations were “unfounded” and commented that they are “part of a disinformation campaign”. Similarly, Swedish biodefense specialists Roger Roffey and Anna-Karin Tunemalm called the allegations ”a Russian propaganda tool”.
