= John J. Barton =

American politician

43rd Mayor of Indianapolis
- In office January 1, 1964 – January 1, 1968
- Preceded by: Albert H. Losche
- Succeeded by: Richard Lugar

Personal details
- Born: June 23, 1906 Indianapolis, Indiana, U.S.
- Died: May 4, 2004 (aged 97) Indianapolis, Indiana, U.S.
- Party: Democratic
- Education: Purdue University

John J. Barton (June 23, 1906 – May 4, 2004) was an American politician who served one term as mayor of Indianapolis. During his time in office, plans were made for the construction of the Indiana Convention Center. He was defeated for re-election by Indianapolis Board of School Commissioners member and future United States Senator Richard Lugar in 1967. Barton was the last Indianapolis mayor whose time in the office was entirely before the consolidation of Indianapolis with Marion County under Unigov.

Barton was an alumnus of Purdue University (ME, class of 1930) and served in the military in World War II. He died on May 4, 2004, aged 97.

== Election results ==
Indianapolis mayoral election, 1963
Party	Candidate	Votes	%
Democratic	John J. Barton (incumbent)	68,316	48.1
Republican	Clarence Drayer	63,091	44.4

Indianapolis mayoral election, 1967
Party	Candidate	Votes	%
Republican	Richard Lugar	72,278	53.3
Democratic	John J. Barton (incumbent)	63,284	46.7

Political offices
Preceded by Albert H. Losche	Mayor of Indianapolis; 1964–1967	Succeeded by Richard Lugar
