= 1994 United States Senate election in Indiana =

- November 8, 1994
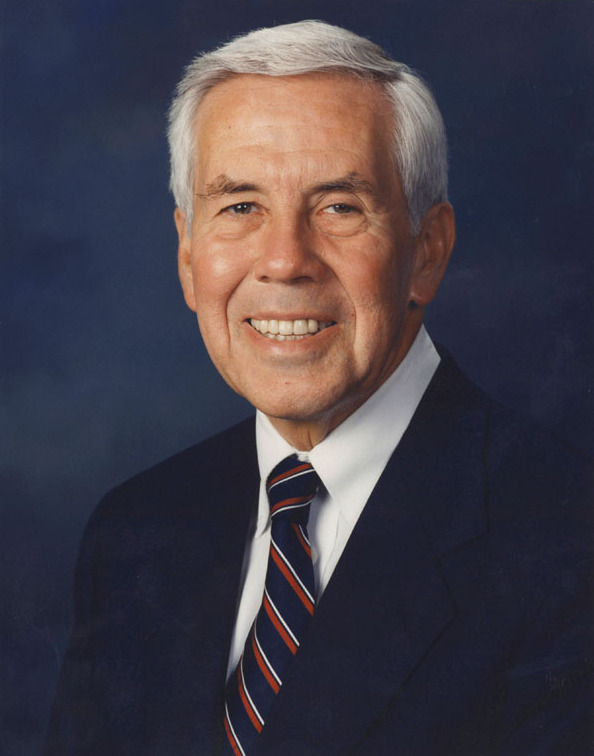

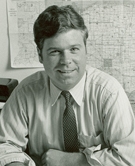
Nominee	Richard Lugar	Jim Jontz
Party	Republican	Democratic
Popular vote	1,039,625	470,799
Percentage	67.35%	30.50%
- County results Lugar: 50–60% 60–70% 70–80% 80–90% Jontz: 50–60%
U.S. senator before election
Richard Lugar
Republican
Elected U.S. Senator
Richard Lugar
Republican

The 1994 United States Senate election in Indiana was held November 8, 1994. Incumbent Republican U.S. Senator Richard Lugar was re-elected to a fourth term. Lugar won all but one county. Lugar became the first Hoosier to win a fourth full term in the U.S. Senate.

== General election ==
=== Candidates ===
- Mary Catherine Barton (New Alliance)
- Barbara Bourland (Libertarian)
- Jim Jontz, former U.S. Representative (Democratic)
- Richard Lugar, incumbent U.S. Senator (Republican)

=== Results ===
General election results
Party	Candidate	Votes	%
Republican	Richard Lugar (Incumbent)	1,039,625	67.35%
Democratic	Jim Jontz	470,799	30.50%
Libertarian	Barbara Bourland	17,343	1.11%
New Alliance	Mary Catherine Barton	15,801	1.02%
Majority		568,826	36.85%
Turnout		1,543,568	
Republican hold		Swing	

=== By county ===
Lugar won 91 of Indiana's 92 counties, Jontz won only the Democratic stronghold of Lake County.

County	Lugar	Votes	Jontz	Votes	Others	Votes	Total
Adams	69.7%	6,957	28.2%	2,812	2.1%	209	9,978
Allen	71.2%	58,175	26.7%	21,760	2.1%	1,756	81,691
Bartholomew	72.9%	14,746	25.2%	5,085	1.9%	378	20,209
Benton	64.4%	1,865	32.9%	954	2.7%	77	2,896
Blackford	64.9%	2,833	33.3%	1,452	1.8%	78	4,363
Boone	80.8%	10,096	17.7%	2,207	1.5%	189	12,492
Brown	69.3%	3,400	27.4%	1,345	3.3%	163	4,908
Carroll	64.0%	4,026	33.2%	2,088	2.8%	176	6,290
Cass	63.0%	8,150	34.9%	4,509	2.1%	272	12,931
Clark	63.7%	13,536	34.6%	7,332	1.7%	371	21,239
Clay	69.3%	5,657	28.4%	2,312	2.3%	189	8,158
Clinton	71.0%	6,321	27.0%	2,408	2.0%	180	8,909
Crawford	62.3%	2,754	35.9%	1,588	1.8%	80	4,422
Daviess	75.4%	6,008	23.2%	1,850	1.4%	112	7,970
Dearborn	66.1%	7,667	29.7%	3,439	4.2%	484	11,590
Decatur	75.2%	6,184	22.6%	1,850	2.2%	184	8,218
DeKalb	68.1%	7,223	30.2%	3,200	1.7%	182	10,605
Delaware	66.4%	24,703	31.7%	11,771	1.9%	712	37,186
Dubois	64.4%	7,728	31.9%	3,829	3.7%	448	12,005
Elkhart	78.0%	23,475	20.1%	6,045	1.9%	573	30,093
Fayette	66.7%	5,218	31.9%	2,497	1.4%	111	7,826
Floyd	64.5%	12,266	33.6%	6,390	1.9%	360	19,016
Fountain	69.2%	4,506	28.5%	1,853	2.3%	148	6,507
Franklin	67.8%	4,637	29.1%	1,993	3.1%	213	6,843
Fulton	64.6%	4,475	33.4%	2,318	2.0%	138	6,931
Gibson	63.0%	7,505	35.2%	4,184	1.8%	209	11,898
Grant	64.0%	12,609	34.6%	6,802	1.4%	280	19,691
Greene	63.2%	6,597	34.5%	3,592	2.3%	235	10,424
Hamilton	87.3%	30,103	10.9%	3,731	1.8%	634	34,468
Hancock	79.0%	10,880	18.6%	2,560	2.4%	324	13,764
Harrison	66.1%	6,703	31.3%	3,172	2.6%	265	10,140
Hendricks	80.8%	17,994	17.2%	3,817	2.0%	442	22,253
Henry	69.2%	10,014	29.1%	4,219	1.7%	243	14,476
Howard	66.1%	17,119	31.6%	8,188	2.3%	583	25,890
Huntington	74.1%	9,727	24.2%	3,176	1.7%	223	13,126
Jackson	65.2%	7,050	33.0%	3,560	1.8%	190	10,800
Jasper	68.3%	4,227	30.4%	1,884	1.3%	81	6,192
Jay	69.0%	4,815	29.2%	2,033	1.8%	129	6,977
Jefferson	65.1%	6,068	32.8%	3,050	2.1%	192	9,310
Jennings	66.5%	4,898	32.3%	2,298	2.2%	164	7,360
Johnson	80.2%	20,650	17.5%	4,490	2.3%	582	25,722
Knox	66.0%	8,155	32.0%	3,953	2.0%	255	12,363
Kosciusko	78.7%	13,039	19.7%	3,269	1.6%	261	16,569
LaGrange	75.1%	4,195	23.3%	1,299	1.6%	88	5,582
Lake	45.3%	43,685	52.6%	50,592	2.1%	2,065	96,342
LaPorte	65.3%	19,357	32.0%	9,479	2.7%	814	29,650
Lawrence	69.2%	8,446	28.4%	3,467	2.4%	289	12,202
Madison	63.3%	27,434	34.8%	15,055	1.9%	810	43,299
Marion	68.7%	133,836	29.1%	56,585	2.2%	4,276	194,697
Marshall	73.0%	7,929	25.5%	2,770	1.5%	158	10,857
Martin	61.1%	2,484	37.1%	1,508	1.8%	75	4,067
Miami	66.8%	6,146	31.2%	2,868	2.0%	188	9,202
Monroe	65.1%	17,430	32.4%	8,655	2.5%	667	26,752
Montgomery	78.8%	8,645	19.2%	2,100	2.0%	217	10,962
Morgan	77.6%	11,865	20.0%	3,059	2.4%	364	15,288
Newton	56.4%	2,316	41.4%	1,696	2.2%	91	4,103
Noble	71.0%	7,268	27.2%	2,780	1.8%	186	10,234
Ohio	59.0%	1,308	36.7%	813	4.3%	95	2,216
Orange	70.7%	4,093	27.0%	1,559	2.3%	131	5,783
Owen	68.4%	3,490	29.2%	1,493	2.4%	122	5,105
Parke	70.6%	4,067	27.3%	1,574	2.1%	121	5,762
Perry	51.7%	3,895	46.5%	3,495	1.8%	132	7,522
Pike	60.9%	3,337	36.4%	1,995	2.7%	150	5,482
Porter	61.8%	22,402	35.7%	12,946	2.5%	892	36,240
Posey	69.2%	6,577	28.5%	2,705	2.3%	218	9,500
Pulaski	64.4%	3,125	34.0%	1,650	1.6%	80	4,855
Putnam	75.0%	6,907	23.1%	2,124	1.9%	175	9,206
Randolph	72.2%	6,237	26.0%	2,241	1.8%	159	8,637
Ripley	68.8%	5,661	30.0%	2,468	1.2%	102	8,231
Rush	75.2%	4,457	23.3%	1,383	1.5%	90	5,930
Saint Joseph	61.3%	36,309	37.1%	21,993	1.6%	939	59,241
Scott	59.6%	2,914	39.1%	1,911	1.3%	66	4,891
Shelby	73.9%	8,828	24.4%	2,910	1.7%	207	11,945
Spencer	63.1%	4,326	36.3%	2,492	0.6%	40	6,858
Starke	59.7%	4,324	38.2%	2,760	2.1%	155	7,239
Steuben	70.7%	5,834	27.9%	2,297	1.4%	118	8,249
Sullivan	59.2%	4,200	39.5%	2,805	1.3%	90	7,095
Switzerland	56.2%	1,441	41.8%	1,073	2.0%	52	2,566
Tippecanoe	71.0%	21,881	24.8%	7,619	4.2%	1,308	30,808
Tipton	71.7%	4,559	28.9%	1,641	2.4%	155	6,355
Union	71.7%	1,742	25.7%	623	2.6%	63	2,428
Vanderburgh	67.9%	36,873	29.5%	16,029	2.6%	1,404	54,306
Vermillion	55.1%	2,969	42.2%	2,271	2.7%	148	5,388
Vigo	69.2%	19,084	34.2%	10,376	2.9%	874	30,334
Wabash	66.8%	7,115	31.8%	3,388	1.4%	146	10,649
Warren	56.6%	1,907	40.8%	1,374	2.6%	88	3,369
Warrick	66.6%	11,534	31.0%	5,368	2.4%	409	17,311
Washington	67.8%	4,921	29.6%	2,145	2.6%	190	7,256
Wayne	72.4%	14,032	25.9%	5,013	1.7%	327	19,372
Wells	74.1%	7,219	24.3%	2,372	1.6%	157	9,748
White	62.8%	4,466	34.3%	2,432	2.9%	209	7,107
Whitley	70.0%	6,805	27.6%	2,680	2.4%	238	9,723

== See also ==
- 1994 United States Senate elections
