= 1988 United States Senate election in Indiana =

- November 8, 1988
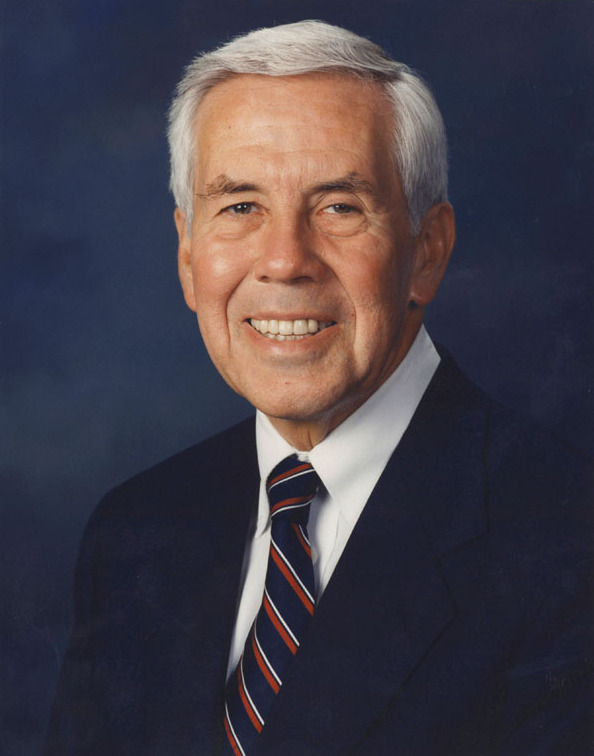

Nominee	Richard Lugar	Jack Wickes
Party	Republican	Democratic
Popular vote	1,430,525	668,778
Percentage	68.14%	31.86%
- County results Lugar: 50–60% 60–70% 70–80% 80–90% Wickes: 50–60%
U.S. senator before election
Richard Lugar
Republican
Elected U.S. Senator
Richard Lugar
Republican

The 1988 United States Senate election in Indiana was held on November 8, 1988. Incumbent Republican U.S. Senator Richard Lugar was re-elected to a third term.

== General election ==
=== Candidates ===
- Richard Lugar, incumbent U.S. Senator (Republican)
- Jack Wickes, attorney (Democratic)

=== Campaign ===
Lugar, a popular incumbent, had token opposition in this election. An April 1988 poll showed that Lugar lead 65% to 23%. By June, Lugar raised over $2 million, while Wickes raised just over $100,000. Lugar agreed to debate Wickes on September 10, 1988.

=== Results ===
Lugar won overall with two-thirds of the vote and won 91 of Indiana's 92 counties, Wickes won only the Democratic stronghold of Lake County.

General election results
Party	Candidate	Votes	%
Republican	Richard Lugar (Incumbent)	1,430,525	68.14%
Democratic	Jack Wickes	668,778	31.86%
Total votes		2,099,303	100.00%
Republican hold			

== See also ==
- 1988 United States Senate elections
