= 2000 United States Senate election in Indiana =

- November 7, 2000
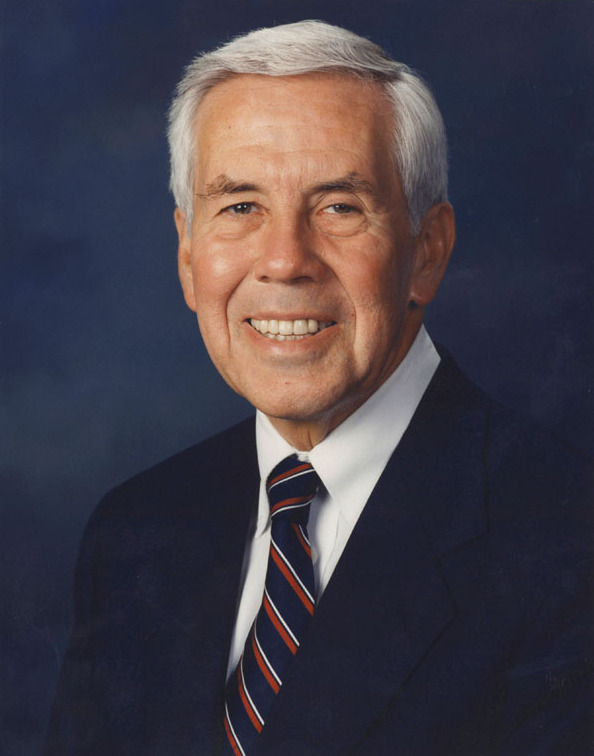

| Nominee | Richard Lugar | David L. Johnson |
| Party | Republican | Democratic |
| Popular vote | 1,427,944 | 683,273 |
| Percentage | 66.56% | 31.85% |
- County results Lugar: 50–60% 60–70% 70–80% 80–90% Johnson: 50–60%
U.S. senator before election
Richard Lugar
Republican
Elected U.S. Senator
Richard Lugar
Republican

The 2000 United States Senate election in Indiana was held on November 7, 2000. Republican incumbent Richard Lugar was re-elected to a fifth term in office over David Johnson.

== General election ==
=== Candidates ===
- Paul Hager (Libertarian)
- David Johnson, attorney and adviser to governor Frank O'Bannon (Democratic)
- Richard Lugar, incumbent U.S. senator since 1977 (Republican)

=== Debates ===
2000 Indiana Senate debates and forums
| No. | Date | Host | Moderator | Link | Republican | Democratic |
| Key: P Participant A Absent N Not invited I Invited W Withdrawn | | | | | | |
| Key: P Participant A Absent N Not invited I Invited W Withdrawn | | | | | Lugar | Johnson |
|---|---|---|---|---|---|---|
| 1 | August 30, 2000 | WFYI | Jim Shella | C-SPAN | P | P |
| 2 | September 29, 2000 | WNIN | David James | C-SPAN | P | P |
| 3 | October 22, 2000 | WNIT | Jack Colwell | C-SPAN | P | P |

=== Polling ===
| Poll source | Date(s) | Sample size | Margin of error | Richard Lugar (R) | David Johnson (D) | Other / undecided (Note: Calculated by taking the difference of 100% and all other candidates combined.) |
|---|---|---|---|---|---|---|
| Harris Insights & Analytics | November 3, 2000 | 5,592 | — | 71% | 25% | 4% |
| Research 2000 | October 29, 2000 | 600 | — | 68% | 20% | 12% |
| Market Shares Corp. | October 27, 2000 | 600 | — | 69% | 10% | 21% |

=== Results ===
Lugar easily won reelection taking 66.5% one of the largest margins in a statewide race in Indiana history. Johnson did win Lake County, a Democratic stronghold, by a wide margin, but Lugar did well elsewhere. Lugar was sworn in for a fifth term on January 3, 2001.

2000 United States Senate election, Indiana
| Party | Candidate | Votes | % | ±% |
|---|---|---|---|---|
| Republican | Richard Lugar (Incumbent) | 1,427,944 | 66.56% | −0.79% |
| Democratic | David Johnson | 683,273 | 31.85% | +1.35% |
| Libertarian | Paul Hager | 33,992 | 1.58% | +0.46% |
| Majority | | 744,671 | 34.71% | −2.14% |
| Turnout | | 2,145,209 | 55% | |
| Republican hold | | Swing | | |

==== By county ====
Lugar won 91 of Indiana's 92 counties, Johnson won only the Democratic stronghold of Lake County.

| County | Lugar | Votes | Johnson | Votes | Hager | Votes | Total |
|---|---|---|---|---|---|---|---|
| Adams | 76.9% | 9,384 | 21.6% | 2,635 | 1.5% | 188 | 12,207 |
| Allen | 73.4% | 83,279 | 25.1% | 28,477 | 1.5% | 1,723 | 113,479 |
| Bartholomew | 72.9% | 18,585 | 25.6% | 6,512 | 1.5% | 383 | 25,480 |
| Benton | 72.6% | 2,804 | 25.0% | 965 | 2.4% | 94 | 3,863 |
| Blackford | 66.9% | 3,245 | 31.7% | 1,539 | 1.4% | 69 | 4,853 |
| Boone | 79.9% | 14,527 | 18.2% | 3,311 | 1.9% | 353 | 18,191 |
| Brown | 67.8% | 4,609 | 29.2% | 1,982 | 3.0% | 204 | 6,795 |
| Carroll | 71.4% | 5,888 | 27.2% | 2,245 | 1.4% | 117 | 8,250 |
| Cass | 69.4% | 10,191 | 29.1% | 4,275 | 1.5% | 223 | 14,689 |
| Clark | 62.8% | 23,087 | 36.0% | 13,230 | 1.2% | 437 | 36,754 |
| Clay | 72.3% | 7,091 | 26.3% | 2,575 | 1.4% | 142 | 9,808 |
| Clinton | 72.7% | 7,899 | 25.7% | 2,790 | 1.6% | 173 | 10,862 |
| Crawford | 62.3% | 2,541 | 36.1% | 1,472 | 1.6% | 65 | 4,078 |
| Daviess | 77.0% | 7,434 | 21.9% | 2,117 | 1.1% | 104 | 9,655 |
| Dearborn | 68.6% | 11,878 | 29.5% | 5,103 | 1.9% | 328 | 17,309 |
| Decatur | 74.8% | 6,544 | 23.7% | 2,068 | 1.5% | 132 | 8,744 |
| DeKalb | 74.6% | 10,116 | 24.0% | 3,244 | 1.4% | 184 | 13,544 |
| Delaware | 63.7% | 27,066 | 34.6% | 14,650 | 1.7% | 743 | 42,459 |
| Dubois | 72.5% | 10,648 | 26.7% | 3,908 | 0.8% | 121 | 14,677 |
| Elkhart | 78.3% | 42,285 | 20.5% | 11,081 | 1.2% | 665 | 54,031 |
| Fayette | 67.2% | 5,714 | 31.2% | 2,658 | 1.6% | 137 | 8,509 |
| Floyd | 66.3% | 19,759 | 32.7% | 9,719 | 1.0% | 304 | 29,782 |
| Fountain | 70.3% | 4,934 | 28.1% | 1,974 | 1.6% | 112 | 7,020 |
| Franklin | 72.3% | 5,902 | 26.1% | 2,127 | 1.6% | 128 | 8,157 |
| Fulton | 73.7% | 6,141 | 25.0% | 2,082 | 1.3% | 111 | 8,334 |
| Gibson | 65.1% | 8,936 | 33.6% | 4,616 | 1.3% | 174 | 13,726 |
| Grant | 68.0% | 17,704 | 30.7% | 7,999 | 1.3% | 341 | 26,044 |
| Greene | 64.5% | 7,797 | 34.2% | 4,132 | 1.3% | 159 | 12,088 |
| Hamilton | 84.0% | 63,216 | 14.4% | 10,834 | 1.6% | 1,194 | 75,244 |
| Hancock | 78.2% | 17,376 | 19.8% | 4,404 | 2.0% | 451 | 22,231 |
| Harrison | 68.6% | 10,112 | 29.7% | 4,379 | 1.7% | 257 | 14,748 |
| Hendricks | 79.5% | 31,800 | 18.8% | 7,525 | 1.7% | 682 | 40,007 |
| Henry | 66.7% | 11,765 | 31.8% | 5,611 | 1.5% | 264 | 17,640 |
| Howard | 67.0% | 22,827 | 31.2% | 10,616 | 1.8% | 608 | 34,051 |
| Huntington | 78.1% | 11,171 | 20.6% | 2,941 | 1.3% | 186 | 14,298 |
| Jackson | 71.2% | 10,389 | 27.6% | 4,027 | 1.2% | 182 | 14,598 |
| Jasper | 70.8% | 7,775 | 27.8% | 3,047 | 1.4% | 157 | 10,979 |
| Jay | 68.6% | 5,442 | 29.6% | 2,349 | 1.8% | 144 | 7,935 |
| Jefferson | 65.8% | 7,641 | 33.0% | 3,830 | 1.2% | 140 | 11,611 |
| Jennings | 70.7% | 6,673 | 27.8% | 2,620 | 1.5% | 140 | 9,433 |
| Johnson | 79.0% | 32,295 | 19.0% | 7,761 | 2.0% | 832 | 40,888 |
| Knox | 67.5% | 9,940 | 30.9% | 4,549 | 1.6% | 237 | 14,726 |
| Kosciusko | 82.5% | 20,282 | 15.7% | 3,871 | 1.8% | 441 | 24,594 |
| LaGrange | 78.0% | 6,464 | 20.7% | 1,712 | 1.3% | 108 | 8,284 |
| Lake | 41.7% | 71,574 | 57.1% | 97,809 | 1.2% | 2,083 | 171,466 |
| LaPorte | 60.3% | 22,589 | 37.1% | 13,864 | 2.6% | 955 | 37,408 |
| Lawrence | 73.8% | 11,733 | 24.6% | 3,913 | 1.6% | 255 | 15,901 |
| Madison | 62.6% | 31,664 | 35.9% | 18,154 | 1.5% | 781 | 50,599 |
| Marion | 58.1% | 158,620 | 40.2% | 109,736 | 1.7% | 4,532 | 272,888 |
| Marshall | 76.2% | 12,208 | 22.8% | 3,654 | 1.0% | 163 | 16,025 |
| Martin | 70.7% | 3,214 | 27.9% | 1,268 | 1.4% | 63 | 4,545 |
| Miami | 69.6% | 8,712 | 29.0% | 3,623 | 1.4% | 176 | 12,511 |
| Monroe | 63.8% | 25,168 | 32.6% | 12,837 | 3.6% | 1,404 | 39,409 |
| Montgomery | 78.5% | 10,280 | 19.7% | 2,571 | 1.8% | 239 | 13,090 |
| Morgan | 76.6% | 16,731 | 21.3% | 4,640 | 2.1% | 452 | 21,823 |
| Newton | 64.0% | 3,463 | 33.5% | 1,814 | 2.5% | 133 | 5,410 |
| Noble | 75.5% | 10,661 | 23.0% | 3,245 | 1.5% | 207 | 14,113 |
| Ohio | 66.3% | 1,614 | 31.9% | 777 | 1.8% | 44 | 2,435 |
| Orange | 72.6% | 5,143 | 25.9% | 1,832 | 1.5% | 109 | 7,084 |
| Owen | 70.0% | 4,502 | 27.3% | 1,756 | 2.7% | 176 | 6,434 |
| Parke | 69.4% | 4,303 | 29.1% | 1,801 | 1.5% | 94 | 6,198 |
| Perry | 54.7% | 3,754 | 44.3% | 3,041 | 1.0% | 68 | 6,863 |
| Pike | 64.4% | 3,821 | 33.8% | 2,007 | 1.8% | 109 | 5,937 |
| Porter | 61.9% | 34,785 | 36.4% | 20,430 | 1.7% | 973 | 56,188 |
| Posey | 70.1% | '7,487 | 28.8% | 3,074 | 1.1% | 121 | 10,682 |
| Pulaski | 69.6% | 3,719 | 29.4% | 1,566 | 1.0% | 56 | 5,341 |
| Putnam | 73.2% | 8,359 | 24.5% | 2,792 | 2.3% | 260 | 11,411 |
| Randolph | 69.7% | 6,776 | 28.9% | 2,808 | 1.4% | 136 | 9,720 |
| Ripley | 72.5% | 7,657 | 25.6% | 2,704 | 1.9% | 196 | 10,557 |
| Rush | 75.7% | 5,334 | 22.0% | 1,552 | 2.3% | 161 | 7,047 |
| Saint Joseph | 63.5% | 59,818 | 35.5% | 33,378 | 1.0% | 927 | 94,123 |
| Scott | 62.1% | 4,798 | 36.4% | 2,810 | 1.5% | 115 | 7,723 |
| Shelby | 72.1% | 10,925 | 26.3% | 3,986 | 1.6% | 250 | 15,161 |
| Spencer | 64.1% | 5,747 | 35.1% | 3,147 | 0.8% | 75 | 8,969 |
| Starke | 59.7% | 4,866 | 38.9% | 3,168 | 1.4% | 113 | 8,147 |
| Steuben | 75.9% | 8,549 | 22.1% | 2,479 | 2.0% | 229 | 11,257 |
| Sullivan | 62.3% | 4,645 | 36.5% | 2,720 | 1.2% | 86 | 7,451 |
| Switzerland | 59.5% | 1,885 | 38.4% | 1,216 | 2.1% | 67 | 3,168 |
| Tippecanoe | 72.2% | 32,101 | 25.5% | 11,357 | 2.3% | 1,034 | 44,492 |
| Tipton | 71.3% | 5,111 | 27.4% | 1,958 | 1.3% | 96 | 7,165 |
| Union | 74.4% | 2,068 | 24.2% | 673 | 1.4% | 39 | 2,780 |
| Vanderburgh | 66.0% | 41,482 | 32.7% | 20,552 | 1.3% | 832 | 62,866 |
| Vermillion | 57.2% | 3,585 | 41.2% | 2,577 | 1.6% | 103 | 6,265 |
| Vigo | 64.1% | 22,886 | 34.2% | 12,176 | 1.7% | 589 | 35,651 |
| Wabash | 74.1% | 9,404 | 24.9% | 3,167 | 1.0% | 125 | 12,696 |
| Warren | 67.7% | 2,454 | 30.6% | 1,106 | 1.7% | 63 | 3,623 |
| Warrick | 68.6% | 14,538 | 30.2% | 6,402 | 1.2% | 250 | 21,190 |
| Washington | 70.4% | 6,828 | 27.1% | 2,629 | 2.5% | 239 | 9,696 |
| Wayne | 66.7% | 15,926 | 31.8% | 7,590 | 1.5% | 356 | 23,872 |
| Wells | 78.2% | 8,565 | 20.4% | 2,235 | 1.4% | 158 | 10,958 |
| White | 74.3% | 7,310 | 24.0% | 2,360 | 1.7% | 169 | 9,839 |
| Whitley | 76.1% | 9,426 | 22.3% | 2,757 | 1.6% | 194 | 12,377 |

== See also ==
- 2000 United States Senate elections
