= 2006 United States Senate election in Indiana =

- November 7, 2006
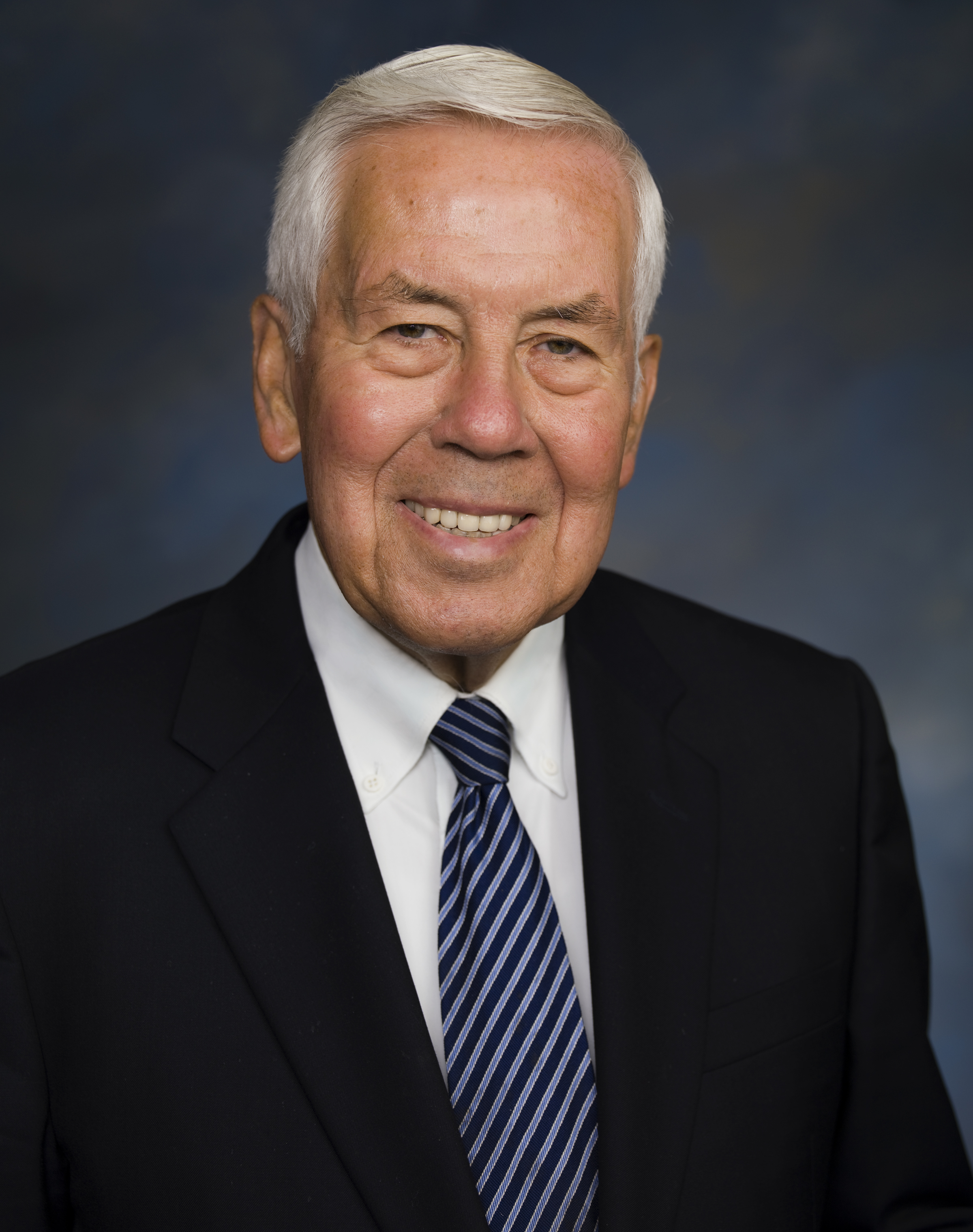

Nominee	Richard Lugar	Steve Osborn
Party	Republican	Libertarian
Popular vote	1,171,553	168,820
Percentage	87.36%	12.59%
- County results Lugar: 70–80% 80–90% >90%
U.S. senator before election
Richard Lugar
Republican
Elected U.S. Senator
Richard Lugar
Republican

The 2006 United States Senate election in Indiana was held November 7, 2006. Incumbent Republican United States Senator Richard Lugar was re-elected to his sixth six-year term with 87.3% of the vote. He did not have a Democratic opponent, and only faced opposition from a Libertarian candidate; this was the only U.S. Senate race in 2006 in which Democrats did not field a candidate.

This was the last successful race of Lugar's decades-long political career. This is also the last time that Lake, Marion, and Monroe counties have voted for a Republican candidate for the Senate.

As of 2026, this is the last election in which an incumbent senator won re-election in this seat.

== Candidates ==
=== Libertarian ===
- Steve Osborn, radio operator

=== Republican ===
- Richard Lugar, incumbent U.S. senator

== Campaign ==
Lugar faced no opposition from the Democratic Party, as they felt that he was unbeatable. The Indiana Senate race was the only one in 2006 in which the incumbent did not face a challenger from the other major party. Also running was Libertarian Steve Osborn. Osborn was from La Porte, Indiana and was an amateur radio operator. Exit polls projected a landslide victory for Lugar, which was borne out by the result.

=== Predictions ===
Source	Ranking	As of
The Cook Political Report	Solid R	November 6, 2006
Sabato's Crystal Ball	Safe R	November 6, 2006
Rothenberg Political Report	Safe R	November 6, 2006
Real Clear Politics	Safe R	November 6, 2006

=== Results ===
The election was not close, as Lugar faced only a Libertarian candidate, as no Democrat filed to run. Osborn's best performance was in Starke County, receiving just 23.7% of the vote. This is one of the best statewide showings for a third-party candidate in Indiana.

County flips: Republican Hold Flip

2006 United States Senate election in Indiana
Party	Candidate	Votes	%
Republican	Richard Lugar (incumbent)	1,171,553	87.36%
Libertarian	Steve Osborn	168,820	12.59%
Write-in		738	0.06%
Total votes		1,341,111	100.0%
Republican hold			

=== By county ===
Lugar won all 92 of Indiana's counties by varying margins.

County	Lugar	Votes	Osborn	Votes	Other	Votes	Total
Adams	90.6%	7,143	9.4%	743	0.0%	3	7,889
Allen	89.3%	65,782	10.6%	7,838	0.1%	38	73,658
Bartholomew	90.0%	16,544	10.0%	1,834	0.0%	9	18,387
Benton	87.1%	2,086	12.9%	310	0.0%	0	2,396
Blackford	85.7%	2,902	14.3%	483	0.0%	0	3,385
Boone	91.5%	11,428	8.5%	1,058	0.0%	0	12,486
Brown	84.9%	4,181	15.1%	743	0.0%	1	4,925
Carroll	86.3%	4,859	13.6%	768	0.1%	3	5,630
Cass	88.1%	8,066	11.9%	1,094	0.1%	1	9,161
Clark	86.6%	21,690	13.4%	3,358	0.0%	0	25,048
Clay	86.9%	6,597	13.0%	987	0.1%	4	7,588
Clinton	87.6%	6,076	12.3%	856	0.1%	7	6,939
Crawford	82.6%	2,318	17.4%	488	0.0%	0	2,806
Daviess	91.4%	6,193	8.6%	586	0.0%	1	6,780
Dearborn	83.7%	9,091	16.2%	1,759	0.1%	11	10,861
Decatur	89.7%	5,575	10.3%	660	0.0%	0	6,415
DeKalb	86.4%	7,967	13.6%	1,258	0.0%	0	9,225
Delaware	88.7%	21,571	11.3%	2,740	0.0%	0	24,311
Dubois	90.4%	9,432	9.6%	1,007	0.0%	0	10,439
Elkhart	89.9%	34,342	9.9%	3,798	0.2%	74	38,214
Fayette	83.2%	4,704	16.8%	951	0.0%	0	5,655
Floyd	88.0%	16,941	12.0%	2,300	0.0%	0	19,241
Fountain	86.4%	4,267	13.6%	671	0.0%	0	4,938
Franklin	83.6%	5,061	16.3%	989	0.1%	7	6,057
Fulton	88.7%	5,493	11.3%	697	0.1%	1	6,191
Gibson	92.3%	8,395	7.7%	969	0.0%	2	9,094
Grant	89.4%	13,758	10.6%	1,638	0.0%	0	15,396
Greene	88.0%	7,757	11.7%	1,031	0.3%	28	8,788
Hamilton	92.0%	49,077	7.9%	4,226	0.1%	47	53,350
Hancock	89.6%	13,810	10.4%	1,605	0.0%	0	15,415
Harrison	85.4%	9,484	14.6%	1,625	0.0%	0	11,109
Hendricks	89.8%	25,216	10.1%	2,841	0.1%	15	28,072
Henry	85.4%	10,375	14.6%	1,776	0.0%	0	12,151
Howard	86.2%	17,660	13.7%	2,804	0.1%	25	20,489
Huntington	87.0%	7,392	13.0%	1,104	0.0%	0	8,496
Jackson	89.1%	9,887	10.8%	1,203	0.0%	5	11,095
Jasper	85.3%	5,122	14.6%	876	0.1%	7	6,005
Jay	85.9%	4,850	14.1%	795	0.0%	0	5,645
Jefferson	85.6%	6,838	14.4%	1,150	0.0%	0	7,988
Jennings	87.7%	6,751	12.3%	948	0.0%	0	7,699
Johnson	90.8%	24,333	9.1%	2,434	0.1%	36	26,803
Knox	87.2%	8,764	12.8%	1,290	0.0%	0	10,054
Kosciusko	88.3%	15,231	11.5%	1,983	0.2%	32	17,246
LaGrange	87.4%	5,063	12.6%	730	0.0%	0	5,793
Lake	81.8%	47,868	18.1%	10,575	0.1%	61	58,504
LaPorte	79.9%	18,967	20.1%	4,773	0.0%	0	23,740
Lawrence	87.3%	9,404	12.4%	1,335	0.3%	36	10,775
Madison	85.8%	25,963	14.2%	4,294	0.0%	11	30,268
Marion	89.0%	127,898	11.0%	15,866	0.0%	0	143,764
Marshall	89.7%	10,958	10.3%	1,253	0.0%	0	12,211
Martin	86.4%	2,765	13.6%	435	0.0%	0	3,200
Miami	84.8%	6,771	14.9%	1,192	0.3%	21	7,984
Monroe	83.2%	21,998	16.8%	4,451	0.0%	0	26,449
Montgomery	88.9%	7,639	11.1%	948	0.0%	4	8,591
Morgan	87.7%	12,254	12.3%	1,720	0.0%	0	13,974
Newton	81.8%	2,915	18.2%	647	0.0%	0	3,562
Noble	87.9%	8,800	12.1%	1,209	0.0%	0	10,009
Ohio	80.1%	1,523	19.9%	378	0.0%	0	1,901
Orange	88.2%	4,503	11.8%	605	0.0%	0	5,108
Owen	87.2%	4,418	12.8%	650	0.0%	0	5,068
Parke	89.1%	4,182	10.9%	512	0.0%	1	4,695
Perry	85.9%	3,916	14.1%	640	0.0%	0	4,556
Pike	87.6%	3,649	12.3%	511	0.1%	3	4,163
Porter	81.5%	25,385	18.2%	5,658	0.3%	90	31,133
Posey	89.7%	7,636	10.3%	877	0.0%	0	8,513
Pulaski	85.9%	3,625	14.1%	595	0.0%	2	4,222
Putnam	89.8%	7,352	10.1%	826	0.1%	8	8,186
Randolph	87.5%	5,587	12.5%	799	0.0%	2	6,388
Ripley	84.7%	6,224	15.2%	1,117	0.1%	7	7,348
Rush	89.5%	4,340	10.5%	506	0.0%	2	4,848
Saint Joseph	88.8%	52,437	11.2%	6,587	0.0%	0	59,024
Scott	84.3%	4,267	15.4%	778	0.3%	14	5,059
Shelby	89.5%	9,070	10.2%	1,035	0.3%	26	10,131
Spencer	92.8%	5,483	7.1%	699	0.1%	8	9,777
Starke	76.3%	4,560	23.7%	1,415	0.0%	0	5,975
Steuben	83.6%	6,728	16.4%	1,314	0.0%	2	8,044
Sullivan	85.1%	4,489	14.9%	783	0.0%	0	5,272
Switzerland	77.7%	1,615	22.3%	463	0.0%	0	2,078
Tippecanoe	84.9%	25,707	15.0%	4,535	0.1%	39	30,281
Tipton	88.1%	4,554	11.9%	616	0.0%	0	5,170
Union	85.1%	1,913	14.9%	336	0.0%	0	2,249
Vanderburgh	87.9%	39,898	12.1%	5,474	0.0%	0	45,372
Vermillion	82.9%	3,380	17.1%	696	0.0%	0	4,076
Vigo	86.4%	19,242	13.6%	3,025	0.0%	10	22,277
Wabash	86.9%	5,653	13.1%	855	0.0%	0	6,508
Warren	87.2%	2,221	12.7%	325	0.0%	0	2546
Warrick	89.5%	15,038	10.4%	1,748	0.1%	11	16,797
Washington	85.7%	6,494	14.0%	1,060	0.3%	19	7,575
Wayne	80.5%	10,846	19.5%	2,631	0.0%	0	13,477
Wells	87.9%	7,389	12.1%	1,011	0.0%	2	8,402
White	86.4%	5,930	13.6%	935	0.0%	0	6,865
Whitley	87.5%	7,855	12.5%	1,123	0.0%	0	8,978

==== Counties that flipped from Democratic to Republican ====
- Lake (largest city: Hammond)

== See also ==
- 2006 United States Senate elections
- 2006 United States House of Representatives elections in Indiana
