= Richard T. James (politician) =

American politician

Richard James

36th Lieutenant Governor of Indiana
- In office January 8, 1945 – January 10, 1948
- Governor: Ralph F. Gates
- Preceded by: Charles M. Dawson
- Succeeded by: Rue J. Alexander

37th Auditor of Indiana
- In office December 1, 1940 – December 1, 1944
- Governor: Henry F. Schricker; Ralph F. Gates
- Preceded by: Frank G. Thompson
- Succeeded by: Alvan V. Burch

Member of the Indiana House of Representatives from the Jay County district
- In office November 7, 1934 – November 4, 1936
- Preceded by: William Frederick Schenk
- Succeeded by: William Tandy Ferguson

Personal details
- Born: February 27, 1910 Portland, Indiana, U.S.
- Died: October 27, 1965 (aged 55) Indianapolis, Indiana, U.S.
- Party: Republican
- Education: Case Western Reserve University

Richard Thomas James (February 27, 1910 – October 27, 1965) was a politician from the U.S. state of Indiana. Between 1945 and 1948 he served as Lieutenant Governor of Indiana.

== Life ==
Richard James was born in Portland, Jay County in Indiana. He attended the Portland High School. Afterwards he studied law at the Case Western Reserve University in Cleveland in Ohio. After his admission to the bar he started a career as attorney. He joined the Republican Party and in 1934 he was elected to the Indiana House of Representatives, where he remained until 1936. Between 1938 and 1940 he was the Deputy Secretary of State for Indiana and from 1941 through 1945 he served as State Auditor.

In 1944 Richard James was elected to the office of the Lieutenant Governor of Indiana. He served in this position between 8 January 1945 and 10 January 1948 when he resigned. In this function he was the deputy of governor Ralph F. Gates and he presided over the Indiana Senate. His resignation from the office of the Lieutenant Governor was a result of his appointment to the office of the vice-president and Treasurer of the Butler University. He remained in these offices until 1952. In the following years he held several offices in various associations, institutions and organizations. He died on 27 October 1965 in Indianapolis.

Political offices
Preceded by Charles M. Dawson	Lieutenant Governor of Indiana; 1945–1948	Succeeded by Rue J. Alexander
