= 1944 United States Senate elections in Indiana =

1944 United States Senate election in Indiana
- November 7, 1944
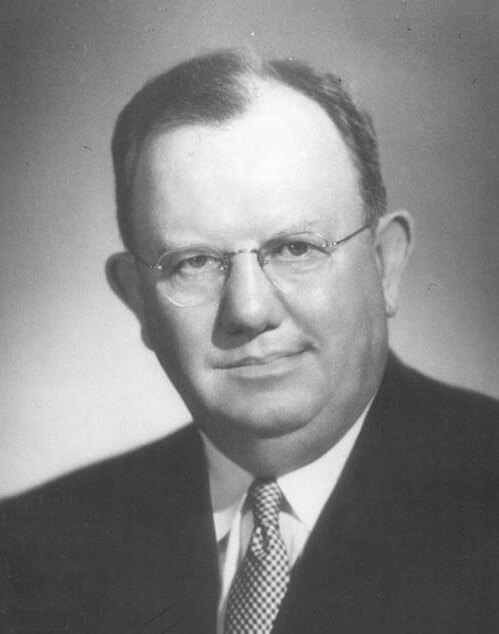

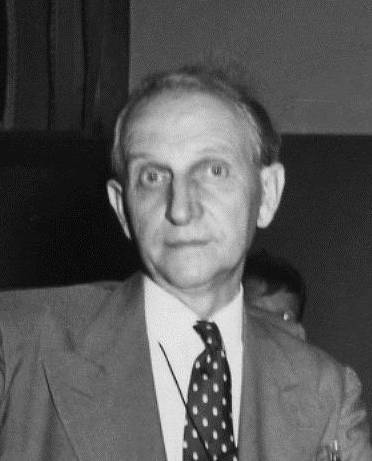
Nominee	Homer Capehart	Henry F. Schricker
Party	Republican	Democratic
Popular vote	829,489	807,766
Percentage	50.23%	48.91%
- County results Capehart: 40–50% 50–60% 60–70% Schricker: 40–50% 50–60% 60–70%
U.S. senator before election
Samuel D. Jackson
Democratic
Elected U.S. Senator
Homer Capehart
Republican

The 1944 United States Senate elections in Indiana took place on November 7, 1944.

In January 1944, Democratic Senator Frederick Van Nuys died in office in January with one year remaining on his term in office. Governor Henry F. Schricker appointed Samuel D. Jackson to finish Van Nuys's term until a successor could be duly elected. Jackson did not run in either the special election to complete Van Nuys's term or the regularly scheduled election for the new term beginning January 1945.

Republicans won both elections. The special election was won by William E. Jenner, who served from November 18 until January 3. In the general election, Republican businessman Homer E. Capehart defeated Governor Schricker. Capehart went on to serve three terms in office.

== General election ==
=== Candidates ===
- Homer E. Capehart, jukebox businessman (Republican)
- George W. Holston (Prohibition)
- Henry F. Schricker, Governor of Indiana (Democratic)
- Marid B. Tomish (Socialist)

=== Results ===
1944 United States Senate election in Indiana
Party	Candidate	Votes	%	±%
Republican	Homer Capehart	829,489	50.23%	▲0.71
Democratic	Henry F. Schricker	807,766	48.91%	▼0.94
Prohibition	Lester N. Abel	12,213	0.74%	▲0.30
Socialist	Marid B. Tomish	1,917	0.12%	▼0.01
Total votes		1,651,385	100.00%	
Republican gain from Democratic				

== Special election ==
=== Candidates ===
- William E. Jenner, former State Senator from Lawrence County (Republican)
- Cornelius O'Brien (Democratic)
- Carl W. Thompson (Prohibition)

=== Results ===
1944 United States Senate special election in Indiana
Party	Candidate	Votes	%	±%
Republican	William E. Jenner	844,303	52.11%	▲2.59
Democratic	Cornelius O'Brien	775,417	47.14%	▼2.71
Prohibition	Carl W. Thompson	12,349	0.75%	▲0.31
Total votes		1,632,069	100.00%	
Republican gain from Democratic				

== See also ==
- 1944 United States Senate elections
