= Rue J. Alexander =

American politician (1889–1949)

Rue Alexander

37th Lieutenant Governor of Indiana
- In office April 14, 1948 – January 2, 1949
- Governor: Henry F. Schricker
- Preceded by: Richard T. James
- Succeeded by: John A. Watkins

43rd Secretary of State of Indiana
- In office December 1, 1942 – December 1, 1946
- Governor: Henry F. Schricker
- Preceded by: Maurice G. Thompson
- Succeeded by: Thomas E. Bath Jr.

Personal details
- Born: October 4, 1889 Talbot, Indiana, U.S
- Died: January 2, 1949 (aged 59) Indianapolis, Indiana, U.S
- Party: Republican

Military service
- Branch/service: United States Army
- Battles/wars: World War I

Rue J. Alexander (October 4, 1889 – January 2, 1949) was a politician from the U.S. state of Indiana. Between 1948 and 1949 he served as Lieutenant Governor of Indiana.

== Life ==
Rue Alexander was born in Talbot, Indiana. He attended the Lafayette Business College and until 1915 he worked on a farm. Afterwards he became an automobile and tractor salesman. In 1918, during the last year of World War I, he joined the United States Army where he served in the motor transportation corps. After the war he became water superintendent at Boswell. Later he was a salesman for a Feed Company. He finally founded his own Feed Company which he named Pine Village Feeding Company.

Alexander joined the Republican Party. Between 1943 and 1947 he was the Secretary of State of Indiana. After the resignation of Lieutenant Governor Richard T. James he was appointed to this office to complete the unfinished term. As Lieutenant Governor he was the deputy of governor Ralph F. Gates and he presided over the Indiana Senate. He served in this position from April 14, 1948, until his death on January 2, 1949. His death occurred just a few days before the end of his term on January 10.

Political offices
Preceded by Maurice G. Thompson	Secretary of State of Indiana; 1942–1946	Succeeded by Thomas E. Bath Jr.
Preceded by Richard T. James	Lieutenant Governor of Indiana; 1948–1949	Succeeded by John A. Watkins
