= 1944 Indiana gubernatorial election =

- November 7, 1944
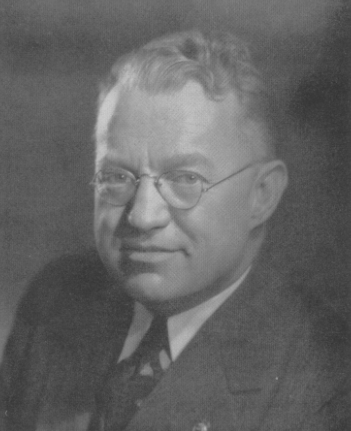

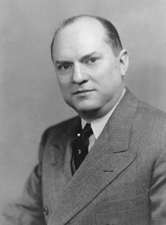
Nominee	Ralph F. Gates	Samuel D. Jackson
Party	Republican	Democratic
Popular vote	849,346	802,765
Percentage	50.97%	48.18%
- County results Gates: 40–50% 50–60% 60–70% Jackson: 40–50% 50–60% 60–70%
Governor before election
Henry F. Schricker
Democratic
Elected Governor
Ralph F. Gates
Republican

The 1944 Indiana gubernatorial election was held on November 7, 1944. Republican nominee Ralph F. Gates narrowly defeated Democratic nominee Samuel D. Jackson with 50.97% of the vote.

== General election ==
=== Candidates ===
Major party candidates

- Ralph F. Gates, Republican, Chairman of the Indiana Republican Party and town attorney of South Whitley
- Samuel D. Jackson, Democratic, former Indiana Attorney General (1940 – 1941)

Other candidates

- Waldo E. Yeater, Prohibition
- William Rabe, Socialist

=== Results ===
1944 Indiana gubernatorial election
Party	Candidate	Votes	%	±%
Republican	Ralph F. Gates	849,346	50.97%	
Democratic	Samuel D. Jackson	802,765	48.18%	
Prohibition	Waldo E. Yeater	12,358	0.74%	
Socialist	William Rabe	1,770	0.11%	
Majority		46,581		
Turnout				
Republican gain from Democratic		Swing		
