= 1952 Indiana gubernatorial election =

- November 4, 1952
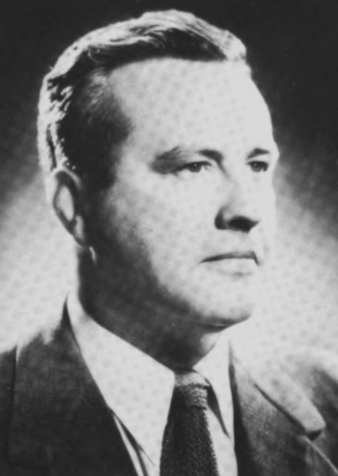

Nominee	George N. Craig	John A. Watkins
Party	Republican	Democratic
Popular vote	1,075,685	841,984
Percentage	55.68%	43.58%
- County results Craig: 40–50% 50–60% 60–70% 70–80% Watkins: 40–50% 50–60%
Governor before election
Henry F. Schricker
Democratic
Elected Governor
George N. Craig
Republican

The 1952 Indiana gubernatorial election was held on November 4, 1952. Republican nominee George N. Craig defeated Democratic nominee John A. Watkins with 55.68% of the vote. Craig and Handley became the first gubernatorial ticket in Indiana history to receive more than one million votes.

== General election ==
=== Candidates ===
Major party candidates

- George N. Craig, Republican, National Commander of The American Legion
- John A. Watkins, Democratic, Lieutenant Governor under Henry F. Schricker

Other candidates

- Lester N. Abel, Prohibition
- Samuel Boorda, Progressive
- Charles Ginsberg, Socialist Labor

=== Results ===
1952 Indiana gubernatorial election
Party	Candidate	Votes	%	±%
Republican	George N. Craig	1,075,685	55.68%	
Democratic	John A. Watkins	841,984	43.58%	
Prohibition	Lester N. Abel	12,554	0.65%	
Progressive	Samuel Boorda	920	0.05%	
Socialist Labor	Charles Ginsberg	726	0.04%	
Majority		233,701		
Turnout		1,931,869		
Republican gain from Democratic		Swing		
