= John A. Watkins (politician) =

American politician

38th Lieutenant Governor of Indiana
- In office January 10, 1949 – January 12, 1953
- Governor: Henry F. Schricker
- Preceded by: Rue J. Alexander
- Succeeded by: Harold W. Handley

Personal details
- Born: March 8, 1898 Marion, Indiana, U.S.
- Died: February 26, 1973 (aged 74) Indianapolis, Indiana, U.S.
- Resting place: Crown Hill Cemetery and Arboretum Sec 73, Sec 436
- Party: Democratic

Military service
- Allegiance: United States of America
- Branch/service: United States Army
- Battles/wars: World War I; World War II

John A. Watkins (8 March 1898 – 26 February 1973) was an American politician from the U.S. state of Indiana. Between 1949 and 1953 he served as Lieutenant Governor of Indiana.

== Life ==
John Watkins was born in Marion, Grant County in Indiana. There is not much information available about his youth and education. Later he published several newspapers in Indiana. During World War I he served in the US-Forces and in World War II he belonged to the US occupation troops in Germany, where he became the military commander of the city of Bamberg. Watkins was a Member of various institutions and organizations. In 1940 and 1941 he was the President of the American Legion section for Indiana.

He joined the Democratic Party and in 1948 he was elected to the office of the Lieutenant Governor of Indiana. He served in this position between 10 January 1949 and 12 January 1953 when his term ended. In this function he was the deputy of Governor Henry F. Schricker and he presided over the Indiana Senate. After the end of his political career he continued his work in the newspaper business. John Watkins died on 26 February 1973 in Indianapolis.

Party political offices
Preceded by Henry F. Schricker	Democratic nominee for Governor of Indiana; 1952	Succeeded by Ralph Tucker
Political offices
Preceded by Rue J. Alexander	Lieutenant Governor of Indiana; 1949–1953	Succeeded by Harold W. Handley
