= 1950 United States Senate election in Indiana =

- November 7, 1950
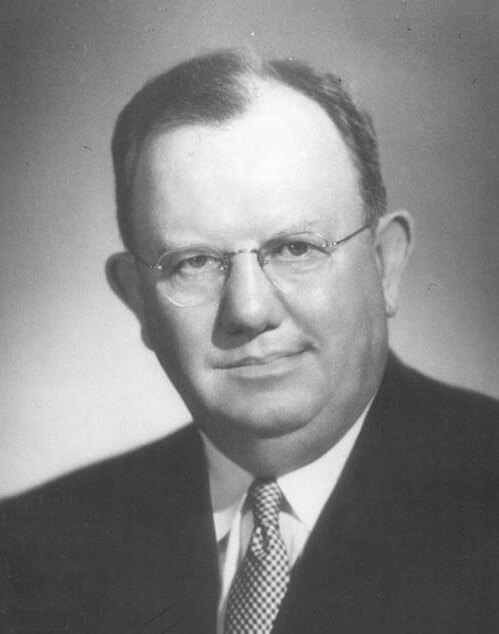

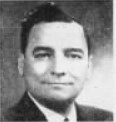
Nominee	Homer Capehart	Alexander M. Campbell
Party	Republican	Democratic
Popular vote	844,303	741,025
Percentage	52.81%	46.35%
- County results Capehart: 40–50% 50–60% 60–70% Campbell: 40–50% 50–60%
U.S. senator before election
Homer Capehart
Republican
Elected U.S. Senator
Homer Capehart
Republican

The 1950 United States Senate election in Indiana took place on November 7, 1950. Incumbent Republican U.S. Senator Homer Capehart was re-elected to a second term in office, defeating Democrat Alex Campbell.

== General election ==
=== Candidates ===
- Lester N. Abel (Prohibition)
- Alexander M. Campbell (Democratic)
- Homer Capehart, incumbent Senator since 1945 (Republican)

=== Results ===
1950 United States Senate election in Indiana
Party	Candidate	Votes	%	±%
Republican	Homer Capehart (incumbent)	844,303	52.81%	▲1.58
Democratic	Alexander M. Campbell	741,025	46.35%	▼2.56
Prohibition	Lester N. Abel	13,396	0.84%	▲0.10
Total votes		1,598,724	100.00%	
Republican hold		Swing		

== See also ==
- 1950 United States Senate elections
