= Claude R. Wickard =

American politician (1893–1967)

Claude Wickard
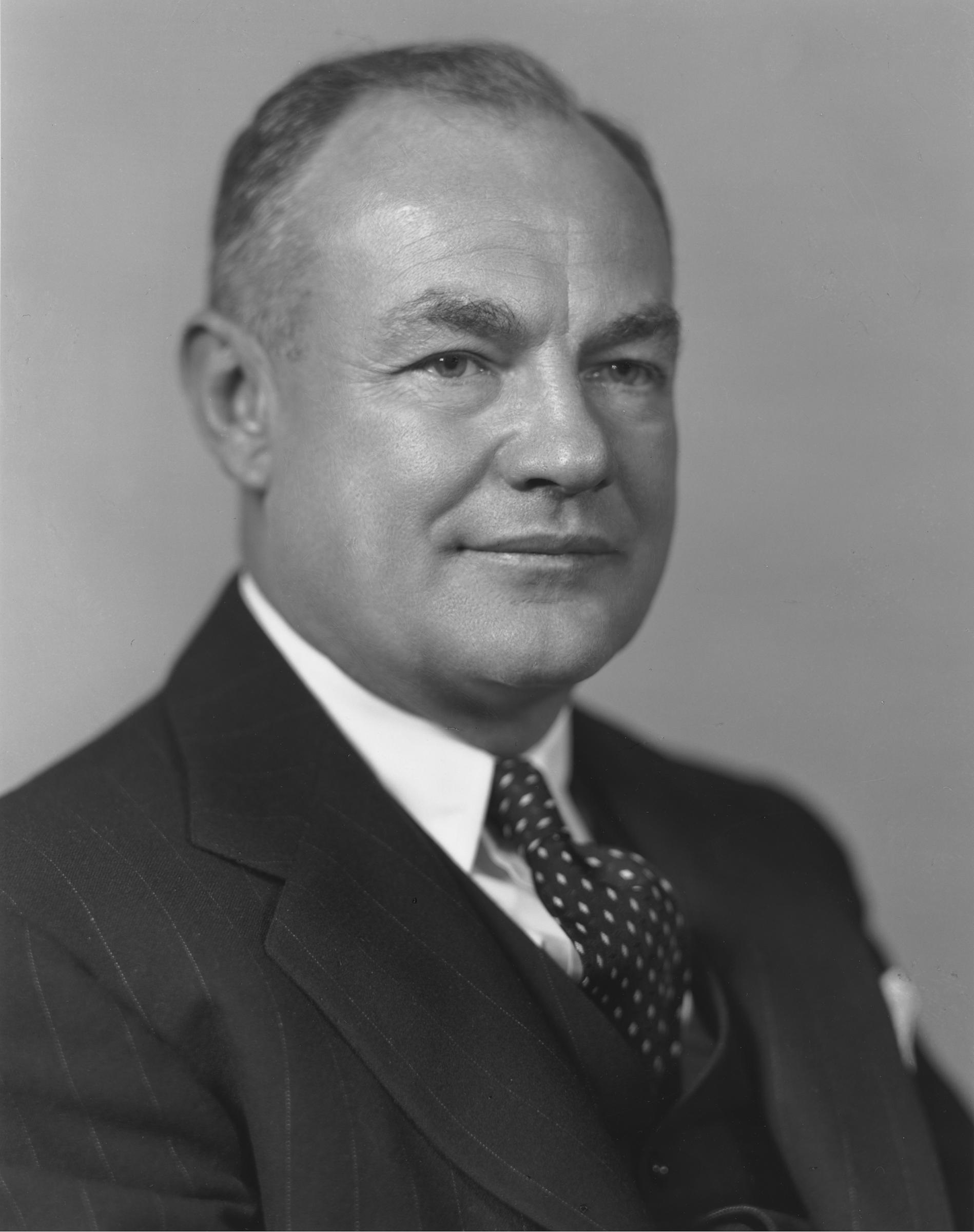

12th United States Secretary of Agriculture
- In office September 5, 1940 – June 29, 1945
- President: Franklin D. Roosevelt; Harry S. Truman
- Preceded by: Henry A. Wallace
- Succeeded by: Clinton Anderson

Personal details
- Born: Claude Raymond Wickard; February 28, 1893 Carroll County, Indiana, U.S.
- Died: April 29, 1967 (aged 74) Delphi, Indiana, U.S.
- Party: Democratic
- Spouse: Louise Eckert
- Children: 2
- Education: Purdue University, West Lafayette (BS)

Claude Raymond Wickard (February 28, 1893 – April 29, 1967) was an American Democratic politician who served as the secretary of agriculture during the administrations of Presidents Franklin D. Roosevelt and Harry S. Truman from 1940 to 1945.

== Biography ==
A Victory Garden is like a share in an airplane factory. It helps win the War and pays dividends too.

— Claude R. Wickard

Wickard was born on his family farm in Carroll County, Indiana, near Camden, on February 28, 1893. He was born to Iva Lenora (née Kirkpatrick) and Andrew Jackson Wickard. He graduated from Purdue University in 1915 with a bachelor's degree in agriculture, and he was chosen as "Master Farmer of Indiana" in 1927 for his improvements in stock feeding and farming.

He was elected from the Indiana Senate in 1932, and was appointed as Undersecretary of Agriculture. When Henry A. Wallace resigned as the secretary of agriculture in September 1940 to run for vice president in the 1940 presidential election, Wickard was appointed to the post.

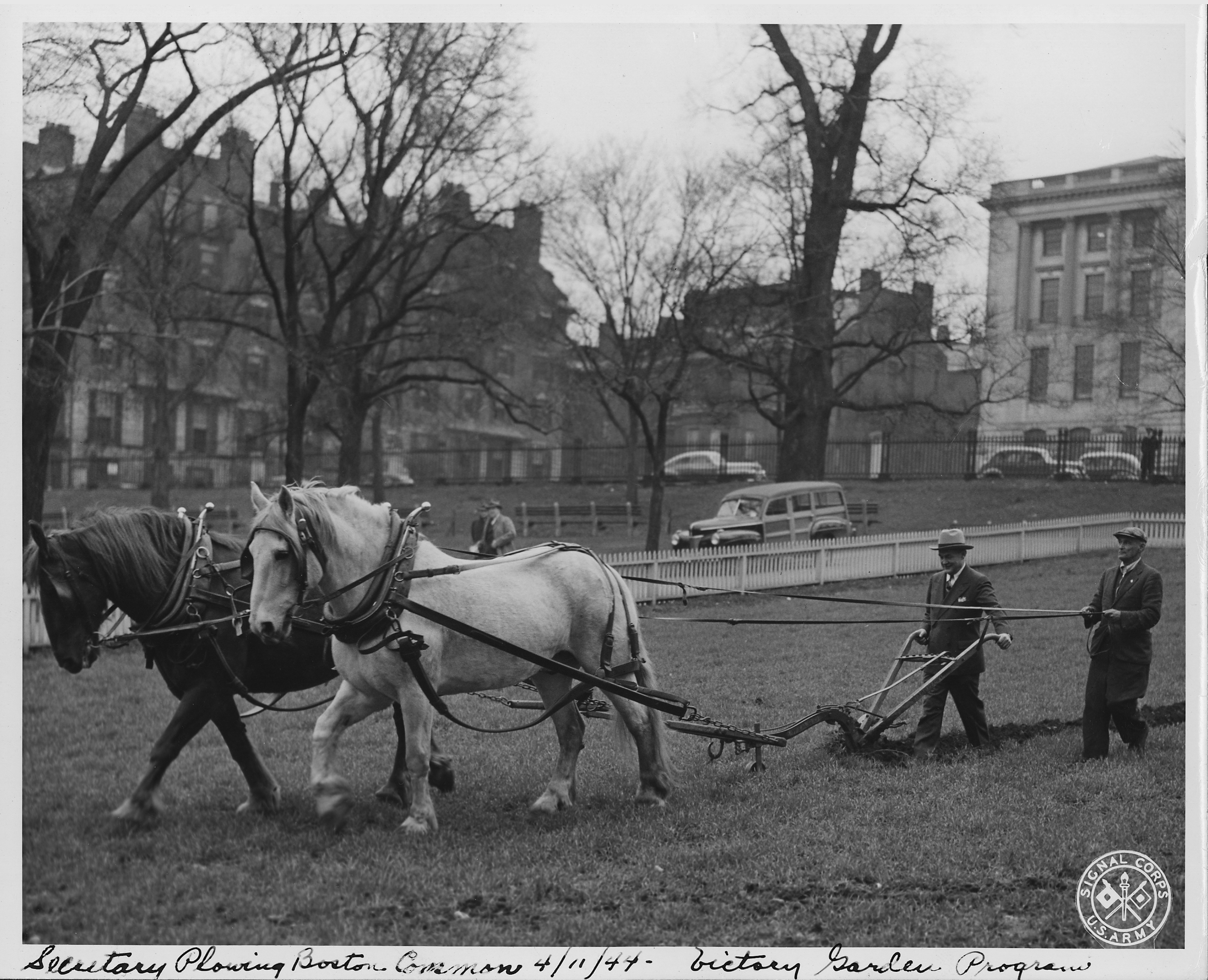
Agriculture Secretary Wickard plowing Boston Common to promote the National Victory Garden Program (April 11, 1944)

He was on the winning side in Wickard v. Filburn, in which the U.S. Supreme Court decided in a case that the federal government could control wheat that was grown in one state for the personal use of a farmer.

During World War II, Wickard headed the War Food Administration, promoting increased farmer production as a matter of patriotism. His slogan was "Food Will Win the War and Write the Peace." On January 18, 1943, Wickard banned the sale of presliced bread, possibly to save tools and wax paper, as required at the time. The ban lasted for less than two months, being rescinded in March 1943. He resigned on June 29, 1945, to become Chief of the Rural Electrification Administration, where he served until 1953. He ran unsuccessfully as a Democratic candidate for the U.S. Senate in 1956, losing to incumbent Homer E. Capehart.

Wickard was killed in an automobile accident and died on April 29, 1967. Reportedly, he ran a stop sign at the intersection of Indiana State Road 18 and the U.S. Highway 421 near Delphi, Indiana, and his vehicle was hit by a crushed-stone truck. He is interred in Maple Lawn Cemetery in Flora, Indiana.

== See also ==
- Sliced bread#1943 U.S. ban
- Wickard v. Filburn

Party political offices
Preceded by Alexander M. Campbell	Democratic nominee for U.S. Senator from Indiana (Class 3); 1956	Succeeded by Birch Bayh
Political offices
Preceded by Henry A. Wallace	U.S. Secretary of Agriculture; Served under: Franklin D. Roosevelt, Harry S. Truman; September 5, 1940 - June 29, 1945	Succeeded by Clinton P. Anderson
