= Charles M. Dawson =

American politician (1893–1973)

35th Lieutenant Governor of Indiana
- In office January 13, 1941 – January 8, 1945
- Governor: Henry F. Schricker
- Preceded by: Henry F. Schricker
- Succeeded by: Richard T. James

Personal details
- Born: October 8, 1893 Indianapolis, Indiana, U.S
- Died: October 9, 1973 (aged 80) Indianapolis, Indiana, U.S
- Resting place: Crown Hill Cemetery and Arboretum, Section 42, Lot 148
- Party: Republican

Charles M. Dawson (October 8, 1893 – October 9, 1973) was a politician from the U.S. state of Indiana. Between 1941 and 1945, he served as the Lieutenant Governor of Indiana.

== Politics ==
Dawson was elected Washington Township trustee four times, serving from 1922 to 1940.

As a republican, Dawson was elected to the office of the Lieutenant Governor of Indiana in 1940 and served between January 13, 1941, and January 8, 1945, when his term ended. In this function, he was the deputy of democratic governor, Henry F. Schricker, and he presided over the Indiana Senate.

From 1953 to 1957, Dawson was the Indiana Director of the Federal Housing Administration.

After working on the states right of way chief, Dawson was appointed to the state highway commission by Governor Harold W. Handley from 1958, serving until mid 1960. Also serving as the commission's vice-chairman.

== Life ==
Dawson was born in Indianapolis, Indiana, on October 8, 1893. He attended Broad Ripple High School, graduating in 1911, and later Central Business College.

He married and had 3 sons, as well as being a master of the Broad Ripple Masonic Lodge and member of the Scottish Rite.

Dawson died on October 9, 1973, in Indianapolis and was buried in Crown Hill Cemetery.

He is the grandfather of Jinx Dawson, singer of American psychedelic rock band Coven.

Political offices
Preceded by Henry F. Schricker	Lieutenant Governor of Indiana; 1941–1945	Succeeded by Richard T. James
