= Tucker v. State =

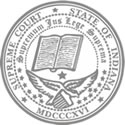
- Court: Supreme Court of Indiana
- Full case name: Tucker et al. v. State of Indiana.
- Decided: June 26, 1941
- Citation: 35 N.E.2d 270; 218 Ind. 614

Court membership
- Judges sitting: Michael Fansler, Curtis Roll, Curtis Shake, Hardress Nathan Swaim, Frank Richman

Case opinions
- Decision by: Fansler
- Dissent: Richman

Keywords
- Separation of powers

Tucker v. State of Indiana, 218 Ind. 614, 35 NE2d 270 (1941), was a landmark decision case by the Indiana Supreme Court that ruled that the Governor of Indiana is the chief executive of the State of Indiana and that the Indiana General Assembly has no authority to delegate or regulate authority that was granted to that office by the Constitution of Indiana. Until the decision by the court, it was held by the General Assembly that it could delegate and revoke executive authority at will.

== Background ==
The state of Indiana has historically had a weak executive branch and a strong legislature, from its original state constitution and the restrictions placed on the office by the anti-governor faction in the constitutional convention, which resented the powers of the territorial governors. The governorship remained a weak position until the American Civil War, when the governor suppressed the legislature and took on unconstitutional powers. In the years after the war, the legislature removed much of the authority and greatly weakened his position, by placing regulations on the office and removing its authority to appoint state officers and hire public employees.

The situation continued until 1933, when the Democratic-controlled legislature passed the Executive Reorganization Act to grant to governor expansive powers over the burgeoning Great Depression government bureaucracy. When Republicans resumed power in 1941, they immediately repealed the act and put in place the State Administration Act of 1941 to return the governor to his pre-Depression level of power. The act reorganized the government into five departments, under the control of commissioners.

== Case ==
Democratic Governor Henry F. Schricker filed a suit against the law after its passage and was able to have the law stayed. Republican Indiana Secretary of State James M. Tucker filed a countersuit claiming the circuit courts had no authority to stay an act of the legislature and appealed the decision to the Indiana Supreme Court.

== Decision ==
The court at that time had four Democrats and one Republican. The court ruled in favor of the governor in a 4-1 decision, along straight party lines. It decided that the governor is in fact the chief executive of the state, and the legislature could not revoke his powers or delegate them if they were expressly granted to him in the state constitution.

== Significance ==
The decision was noted because until then, the legislature had freely regulated the powers of the governor. The court created, for the first time, a legal basis for the governor to assume power in areas previously delegated to other officials. The decision remains an important factor in the state's patronage system.
