= 1956 United States Senate election in Indiana =

- November 6, 1956
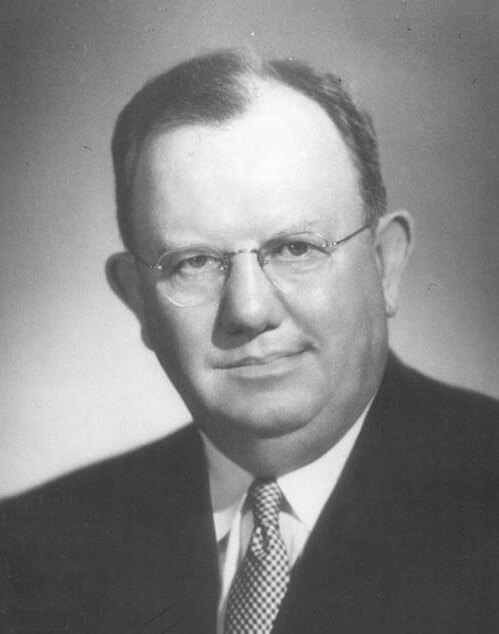

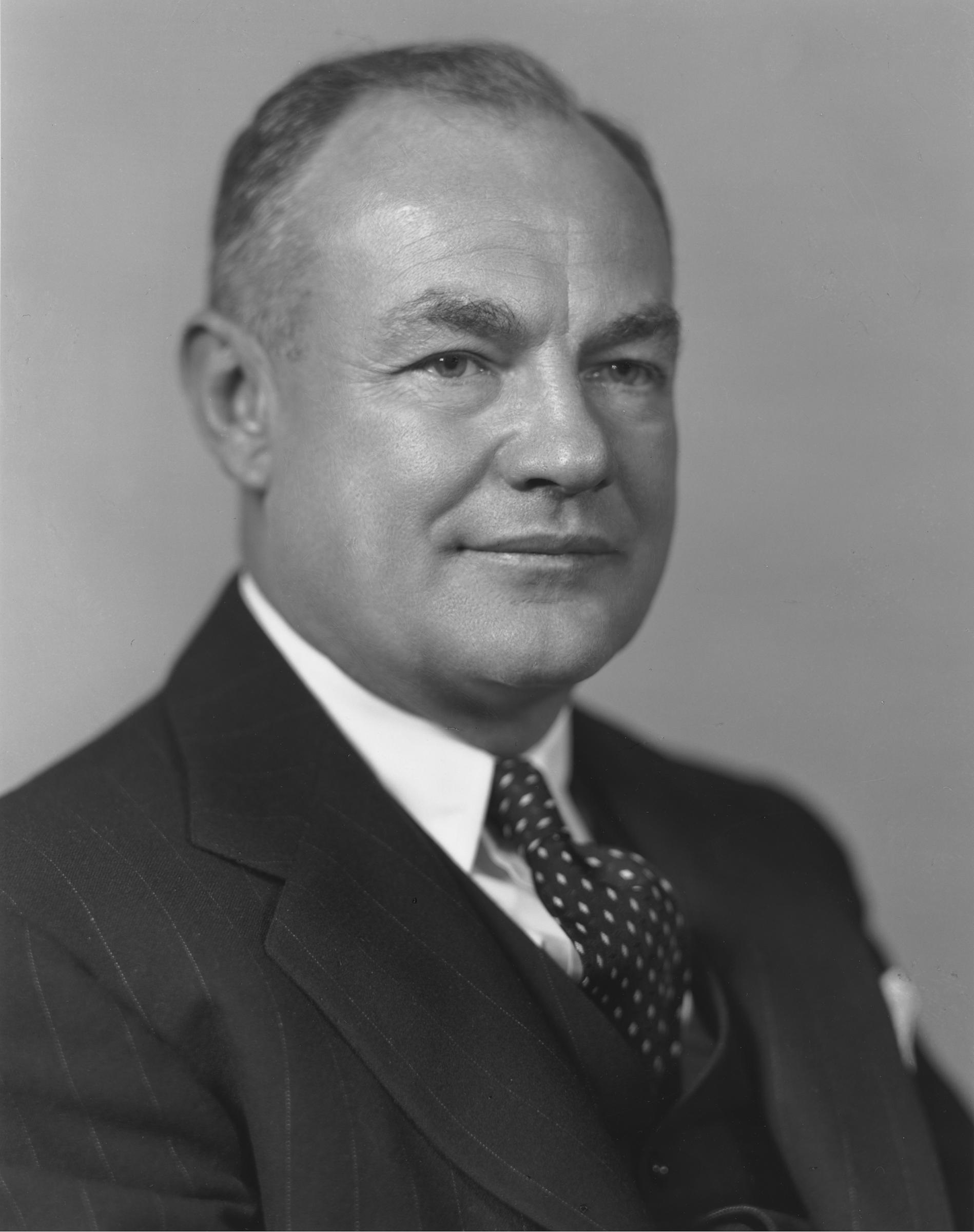
| Nominee | Homer Capehart | Claude Wickard |
| Party | Republican | Democratic |
| Popular vote | 1,084,262 | 871,781 |
| Percentage | 55.21% | 44.39% |
- County results Capehart: 50–60% 60–70% 70–80% Wickard: 40–50% 50–60%
U.S. senator before election
Homer Capehart
Republican
Elected U.S. Senator
Homer Capehart
Republican

The 1956 United States Senate election in Indiana took place on November 6, 1956. Incumbent Republican U.S. Senator Homer Capehart was re-elected to a third term in office, defeating former U.S. Secretary of Agriculture Claude Wickard.

== General election ==
=== Candidates ===
- Homer Capehart, incumbent Senator since 1945 (Republican)
- Gordon A. Long (Socialist Labor)
- Carl W. Thompson (Prohibition)
- Claude Wickard, former U.S. Secretary of Agriculture (1940–45) (Democratic)

=== Results ===
1956 United States Senate election in Indiana
| Party | Candidate | Votes | % | ±% |
|---|---|---|---|---|
| Republican | Homer Capehart (incumbent) | 1,084,262 | 55.21% | ▲2.40 |
| Democratic | Claude R. Wickard | 871,781 | 44.39% | ▼1.96 |
| Prohibition | Carl W. Thompson | 6,685 | 0.34% | ▼0.50 |
| Socialist Labor | Gordon A. Long | 1,258 | 0.06% | N/A |
| Total votes | | 1,963,986 | 100.00% | |
| Republican hold | | Swing | | |

== See also ==
- 1956 United States Senate elections
