= Alexander M. Campbell =

American lawyer

Alexander Morton Campbell
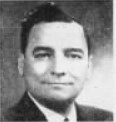

United States Assistant Attorney General for the Criminal Division
- In office 1948–1949
- President: Harry Truman
- Preceded by: T. Vincent Quinn
- Succeeded by: James M. McInerney

United States Attorney for the Northern District of Indiana
- In office 1941–1949
- President: Franklin Roosevelt; Harry Truman
- Preceded by: James R. Fleming
- Succeeded by: Gilmore Haynie

Personal details
- Born: Alexander Morton Campbell; April 14, 1907 Coldwater, Ohio, U.S.
- Died: 1968 (aged 60–61) El Paso, Texas, U.S.
- Education: Olivet College
- Alma mater: Indiana University Bloomington
- Known for: Assistant Attorney General for Criminal Division of DOJ (1948-1949)

Alexander Morton Campbell (1907–1968) was an Indiana lawyer who served in the United States Department of Justice as Assistant U.S. Attorney General for the Criminal Division, formally from August 1948 through December 20, 1949, under Tom C. Clark as U.S. Attorney General (1945–49).

== Background ==
Born in Coldwater, Ohio on April 14, 1907, Campbell grew up in Indiana. He attended high school in Fort Wayne.

He attended Olivet College and Indiana University Bloomington, where he received an LLB in 1930.

== Career ==
=== Early career ===
In 1933, Campbell joined a law firm in Fort Wayne, Indiana. His office was located at the Lincoln Bank Tower.

In 1934, he became Democratic Party chair of Allen County, Indiana through 1936.

=== Justice Department offices in Indiana ===
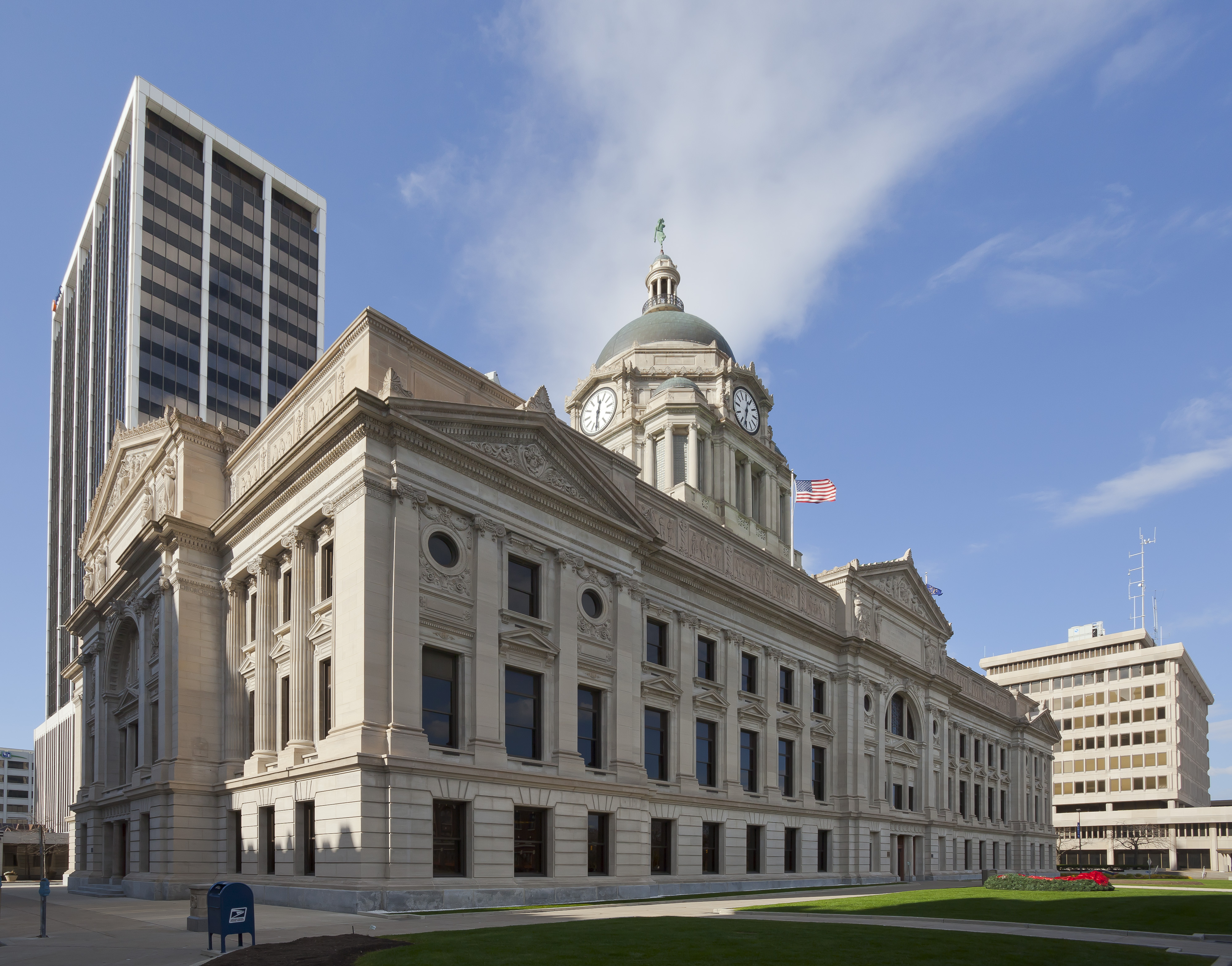
Allen County Courthouse in Fort Wayne, Indiana

In 1936, Campbell became principal deputy to James R. Fleming, U.S. Attorney for the Northern District of Indiana.

In Spring 1941, when Fleming left office, Campbell became acting attorney general. In November 1941, President Franklin Delano Roosevelt formally appointed him to that position (U.S. Attorney for the Northern District of Indiana).

In 1950 he ran for the U.S. Senate against Homer E. Capehart.

=== US Government ===
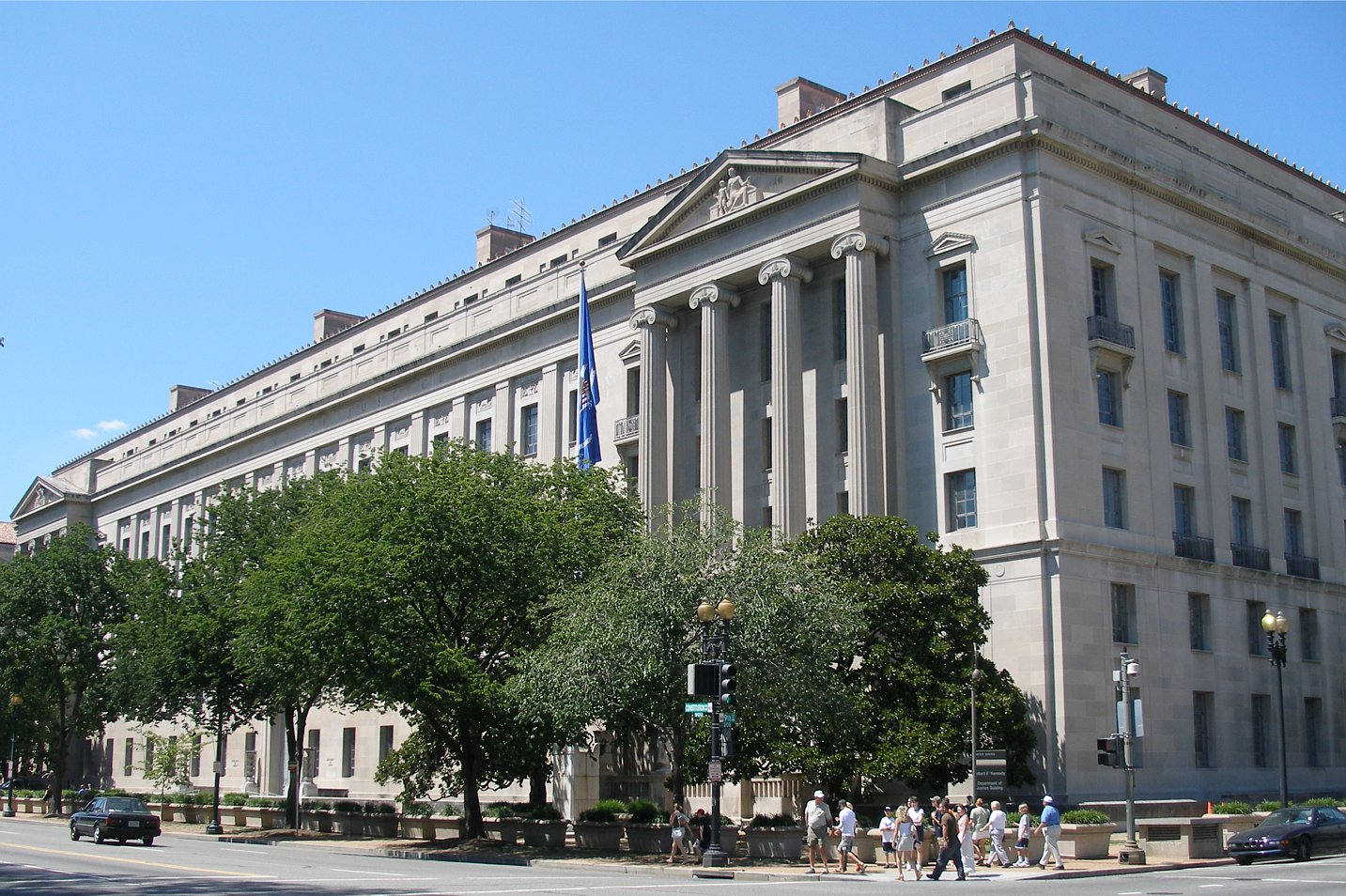
U.S. Department of Justice building

In Spring 1948, Campbell was asked to serve as acting Assistant Attorney General for the Criminal Division of the U.S. Department of Justice, after T. Vincent Quinn resigned to run for office. Campbell received formal appointment Assistant Attorney General for the Criminal Division of the U.S. Department of Justice in August 1948.

Campbell argued for government in Christoffel v. United States against Harold Christoffel, a Wisconsin labor organizer, accused of perjury over CPUSA membership.

DOJ stood up a "lobbying investigation unit" to identify violations the Federal Regulation of Lobbying Act of 1946 (successor to the Foreign Agents Registration Act of 1938.

During his tenure, DOJ prosecuted cases including those of Tokyo Rose, Axis Sally, Alger Hiss, and Judith Coplon. Notably, he was aware that the only witnesses against Iva Toguri D'Aquino (AKA Tokyo Rose) had perjured themselves, but pressed anyway for the conviction of D'Aquino, who was sentenced to 10 years for treason. In 1975 journalists uncovered the perjury, and in 1977 President Ford pardoned the innocent D'Aquino. Although aware of the perjury, Campbell declined to press for prosecution of the perjurers for fear that it would affect the prosecution of D'Aquino.

=== Hiss case ===
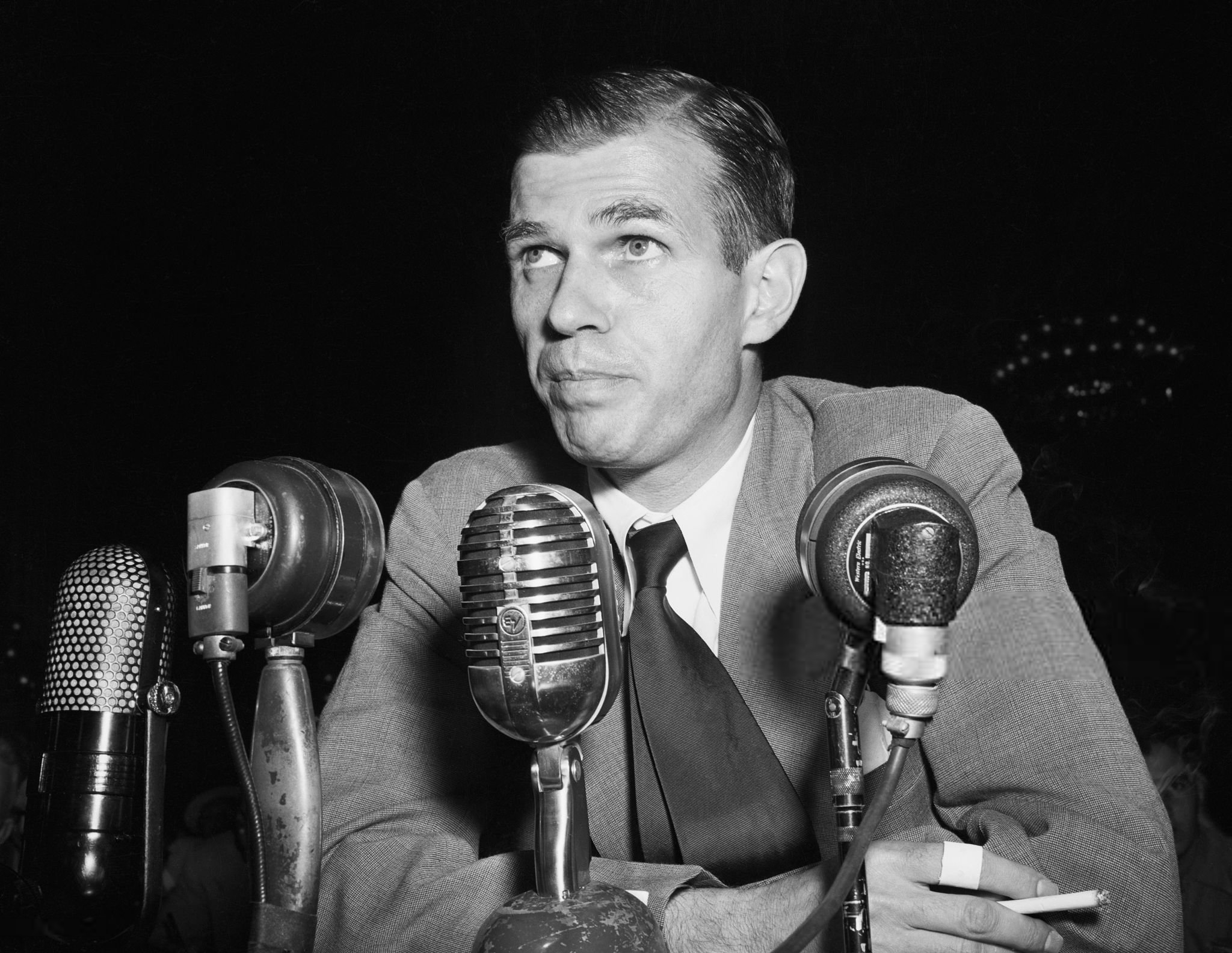
Alger Hiss in 1948

In November 1948, after Whittaker Chambers first presented the Baltimore Documents (from Chambers' "life preserver" package), including handwritten and typewritten pages of Alger Hiss, into Hiss's libel suit against Chambers, Campbell drove with two assistants from Washington to Baltimore on behalf of Justice. The department would investigate those documents, leading both Hiss and Chambers back to a Grand Jury for further testimony. In December 1948, Chambers surrendered remaining items, dubbed the "Pumpkin Papers," really microfilm that Chambers had not yet surrendered. Justice used these materials to indict Hiss on two counts of perjury; Hiss was sentenced in January 1950.

Campbell also questioned then congressional representative Richard Nixon regarding HUAC's role in the Hiss Case, including whether HUAC had the right to withhold the Pumpkin Papers microfilm from DOJ and the grand jury:

CAMPBELL: May I say this: that in all of my 13 years of experience as a United States Attorney the investigative agencies of the United States Attorney and the FBI did not permit any person to keep evidence which is vital and essential to the case. We don't permit the sheriffs to keep them, we don't permit anybody to keep them, because it's a highly important piece of evidence.

NIXON: As an attorney - I think all three of you are attorneys - you will know that what I am discussing has been a matter which for 150 years has been the rule of the House and of the Congress. All that I can tell you is that this is the situation. I mean, of course, if I were a sheriff I would turn it over to you, certainly; a sheriff can't keep it. But I mean there is a slight difference. I mean not much. I mean, I don't mean to say anything derogatory about a sheriff or about a Congressman.

During a 1962 television interview on ABC TV, Hiss lumped Campbell into a general group whom he "denounced as conspirators in a monstrous plot to convict him on concocted evidence" and included: the presiding judge at his second trial, the three appellate court justices who rejected his appeal, J. Edgar Hoover and the FBI, assistant attorney general Alexander M. Campbell, federal prosecutor Thomas F. Murphy, members of the New York grand jury who indicted him, jury members in his two trials who convicted him, and HUAC members and particularly Richard Nixon and Karl Mundt."

=== Later years ===
On December 20, 1949, Campbell resigned to run for Democratic nomination for one of Indiana’s 1950 seats in the U.S. Senate but lost to incumbent Republican Senator Homer Capehart. He spoke publicly on Justice cases, e.g., "The Inside Story of the Recent Spy Trials" in an address to the Beth-El Men's Club on April 26, 1950.

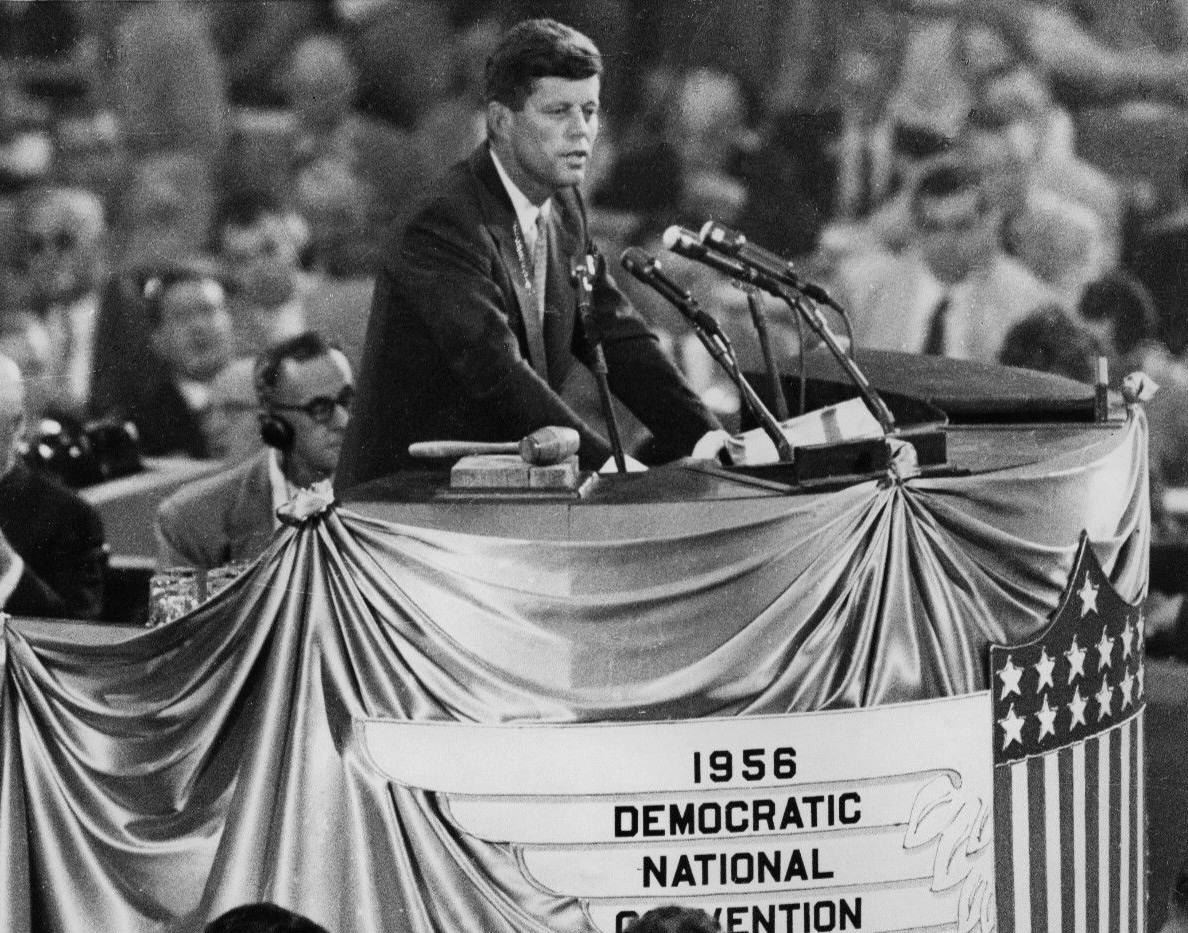
John F. Kennedy Jr. nominates Adlai Stevenson as 1956 Democratic candidate for president

In 1956, he served as an Indiana delegate to the 1956 Democratic National Convention in Chicago, which nominated a ticket of Adlai Stevenson with Estes Kefauver, who lost to the incumbent ticket of Dwight Eisenhower with Richard Nixon.

== Personal and death ==
In 1968, Campbell died in El Paso, Texas.

== See also ==
- Tom C. Clark
- Tokyo Rose
- Axis Sally
- Alger Hiss
- Judith Coplon

Party political offices
Preceded by Henry F. Schricker	Democratic nominee for U.S. Senator from Indiana (Class 3); 1950	Succeeded by Claude R. Wickard
