= Samuel D. Jackson =

American politician

Samuel Dillon Jackson
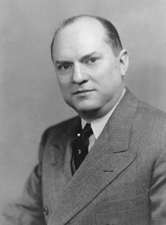

United States Senator from Indiana
- In office January 28, 1944 – November 13, 1944
- Appointed by: Henry F. Schricker
- Preceded by: Frederick Van Nuys
- Succeeded by: William E. Jenner

29th Attorney General of Indiana
- In office June 6, 1940 – January 15, 1941
- Governor: M. Clifford Townsend
- Preceded by: Omer Stokes Jackson
- Succeeded by: George N. Beamer

Prosecuting Attorney of Allen County, Indiana
- In office January 1, 1924 – December 31, 1927
- Preceded by: Louis F. Crosby
- Succeeded by: Edwin R. Thomas

Personal details
- Born: May 28, 1895 Lafayette Township, Allen County, Indiana, U.S.
- Died: March 8, 1951 (aged 55) Fort Wayne, Indiana, U.S.
- Resting place: Lindenwood Cemetery, Fort Wayne, Indiana
- Party: Democratic
- Spouse: Anna Fern Bennett (m. 1914-1951, his death)
- Children: 3
- Education: Indiana Law School
- Profession: Attorney

Military service
- Allegiance: United States
- Branch/service: United States Army
- Years of service: 1917-1919
- Rank: Captain
- Unit: Office of the Judge Advocate General, Camp Zachary Taylor, Kentucky
- Battles/wars: World War I

Samuel Dillon Jackson (May 28, 1895 – March 8, 1951) was an American attorney and politician from Indiana. He was the Attorney General of Indiana from 1940 to 1941, and briefly served as a United States Senator in 1944.

== Early life ==
Jackson was born in Lafayette Township, Allen County, Indiana on May 28, 1895, the son of Reverend Isaiah H. Jackson and Minnie (Whitterberger) Jackson. He attended the public schools of Fort Wayne and graduated from the city's Central High School in 1914. He then attended Indiana Law School (now Indiana University Robert H. McKinney School of Law), from which he received his Bachelor of Laws (LL.B.) degree in 1917. Later that year, Jackson was admitted to the bar. He delayed the commencement of a law practice in order to enter the military for World War I.

== World War I ==
Jackson enlisted in the United States Army for World War I. He attended the officers' training camp held at Fort Benjamin Harrison and received his commission as a second lieutenant of Infantry in August 1917. He was subsequently assigned to legal duties in the office of the judge advocate at Camp Zachary Taylor, Kentucky. Jackson received promotion to first lieutenant and captain during the war, and was mustered out in April 1919.

== Start of career ==
After leaving the Army, Jackson engaged in the practice of law at Fort Wayne as the head of a firm that eventually became known as Jackson, Longfellow and Jackson. In 1919 and 1920, Allen served as assistant supervisor of the U.S. census for Indiana's 12th Congressional District.

A Democrat, Jackson served as prosecuting attorney of Allen County from 1924 to 1927. In 1928, he was the Democratic nominee for a seat in the United States House of Representatives and was defeated by David Hogg, 55.3 percent to 44.7.

Jackson remained active in politics as a Democrat and was head of Indiana's Democratic Party speaker's bureau in 1934 and permanent chairman of the Indiana Democratic Party's 1936 convention. In July 1940, Jackson received an interim appointment as attorney general of Indiana, and he completed the term of the late Omer Stokes Jackson.

== Later career ==
On January 28, 1944, Jackson was appointed to the U.S. Senate, filling the vacancy caused by the death of Frederick Van Nuys. He served from January 28, 1944, to November 13, 1944, and was not a candidate for election to the remainder of the term, or for the full term that began on January 3, 1945.

Jackson was permanent chairman of the 1944 Democratic National Convention. In 1944, he was the unsuccessful Democratic nominee for Governor of Indiana, losing to Republican Ralph F. Gates, 50.97 percent to 48.18. After losing the governor's race, Jackson resumed the practice of law in Fort Wayne. In 1946 he was hired for a three-year term as governor of the National Association of Commodity Exchanges and Allied Trades. In this position, Jackson oversaw the development of a comprehensive program of self-regulation for commodity exchanges and boards of trade in Chicago, Minneapolis, Kansas City, Missouri, and New York City.

== Civic and fraternal memberships ==
Jackson participated in several organizations associated with Freemasonry, including the York Rite, Shriners, and Scottish Rite. He attained the 33rd degree of the Scottish Rite, was a member of Indiana's Supreme Council, and served as Deputy for the District of Indiana.

As part of his career as an attorney, Jackson maintained memberships in the American Bar Association, Indiana Bar Association, and Allen County Bar Association. He served a term as a member of the state association's advisory board, and a term as president of the Allen County Bar Association.

Jackson was an active member of the American Legion following his Army service. In the early 1920s he became a charter member of legion Post 47 in Fort Wayne.

The Izaak Walton League, an environmental conservation advocacy organization, included Jackson as a member. He was also a member of Fort Wayne's Quest Club, an organization created to provide members a forum for presenting original research on current events and social, economic, scientific, cultural, political, and historical subjects.

== Death and burial ==
He died in Fort Wayne on March 8, 1951. Jackson was buried at Lindenwood Cemetery in Fort Wayne.

== Family ==
In 1914, Jackson married Anna Fern Bennett. They were the parents of three children—James W., Robert I., and Samuel D. Jr.

Party political offices
Preceded by Henry F. Schricker	Democratic nominee for Governor of Indiana; 1944	Succeeded by Henry F. Schricker
Political offices
Preceded by Omer Stokes Jackson	Indiana Attorney General; 1940-1941	Succeeded by George N. Beamer
U.S. Senate
Preceded by Frederick Van Nuys	U.S. senator (Class 3) from Indiana; 1944; Served alongside: Raymond E. Willis	Succeeded by William E. Jenner
