= Homer E. Capehart =

American politician (1897–1979)

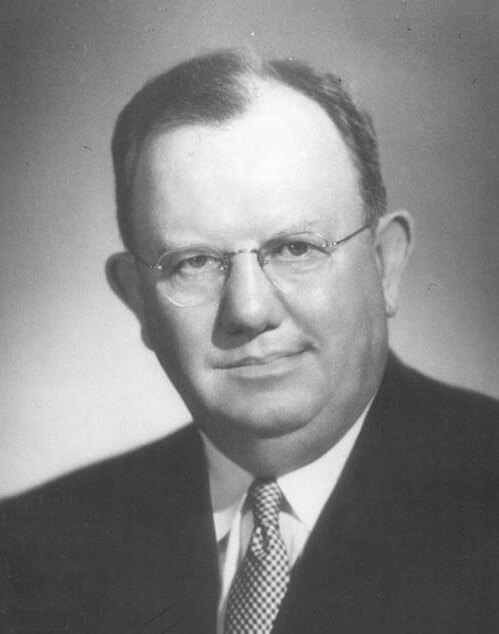

United States Senator from Indiana
- In office January 3, 1945 – January 3, 1963
- Preceded by: William E. Jenner
- Succeeded by: Birch Bayh

Personal details
- Born: Homer Earl Capehart; June 6, 1897 Algiers, Indiana, U.S.
- Died: September 3, 1979 (aged 82) Indianapolis, Indiana, U.S.
- Resting place: Crown Hill Cemetery and Arboretum, Section 46, Lot 241; 39.8202247°N 86.1713438°W
- Party: Republican
- Spouse: Irma Viola Mueller Capehart
- Children: 2 sons, 1 daughter
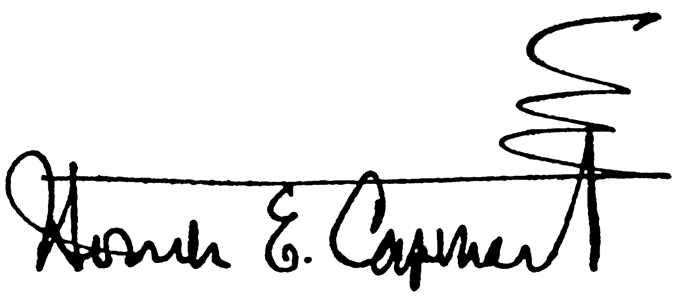
- Signature

Military service
- Branch/service: U.S. Army
- Years of service: 1917–1919
- Rank: Sergeant
- Unit: Infantry, Quartermaster Corps
- Battles/wars: World War I

Homer Earl Capehart (June 6, 1897 – September 3, 1979) was an American businessman and politician from Indiana. After serving in the United States Army during World War I, he became involved in the manufacture of record players and other products. Capehart later served 18 years (1945–1963) in the U.S. Senate as a Republican from Indiana. Initially an isolationist on foreign policy, he took a more internationalist stance in later years; he retired after a narrow defeat for a fourth term in 1962.

== Early life ==
Capehart was born in Algiers, Indiana, in Pike County, the son of Susan (Kelso) and Alvin T. Capehart, a tenant farmer. During World War I, he enlisted in the U.S. Army in 1917, served in the infantry and supply corps, and was discharged as a sergeant in 1919.

== Business career ==
Capehart attained fame as the father of the jukebox industry. He worked for the company Holcomb and Hoke, which made record players and popcorn machines, until 1928. He started his own company in 1928, and was forced out of the company by investors in 1931. The company was taken over as one of the divisions in the Philo Farnsworth's Farnsworth Television and Radio Company in 1939. In 1932, Capehart formed a new company called Packard. Packard developed the Simplex mechanism for automatic record changing, and sold the device to Wurlitzer. The entire company was eventually bought by Wurlitzer.

== Political career ==
Capehart's career in the music industry made him wealthy and provided a path to the national political stage. Being the center-point for a Republican Party revolution in Indiana and the Midwest, mainly by sponsoring a huge "Cornfield-Conference" on one of his farms in 1938. Capehart was first elected to the U.S. Senate in 1944, narrowly defeating Henry Schricker, going on to win subsequent victories in 1950 against Alexander M. Campbell and in 1956 against Claude R. Wickard. When first elected to the Senate at the height of World War II, Capehart supported efforts to compromise with the Japanese on terms of surrender in the summer of 1945 when minority leader Wallace H. White, Jr. stated that the war might end sooner if President Truman would state specifically in the upper chamber just what unconditional surrender meant for the Japanese. After 1945, Capehart was critical of the Truman administration and the military for their postwar policies in Germany, accusing Truman and General Dwight D. Eisenhower of a conspiracy to starve the remains of the German nation.

Throughout the 1950s, Capehart was constantly at odds with his Senate colleague William E. Jenner, a staunch isolationist Republican who consistently opposed President Eisenhower's "modern-Republicanism." Capehart, although an isolationist himself during his first term in the Senate, became increasingly more internationalist during his later years in the Senate and this eventually led to the split with Jenner.

By 1959, Jenner had retired and Democrat Vance Hartke had taken his place. Capehart was extremely critical of President Kennedy and his New Frontier programs, such as Medicare and the Peace Corps. In 1962, Capehart attained his greatest popularity and what would ultimately become his lasting legacy as one of the key figures in the Cuban Missile Crisis by calling for a "crack-down on Cuba" and warning of a missile build-up on the island. Kennedy, before receiving the famous spy-plane photos, thought Capehart was "inventing an issue." This was not the case and Capehart, although not appreciated at the time, has come to be seen in a more positive light because of his early and aggressive stances on Cuba.

Capehart also backed, with Senator Kenneth Wherry of Nebraska, legislation for building military family housing in the post-World War II era, when there were critical shortages of such housing. His support of public housing for veterans was part of his support of a strong defense, which he considered a legitimate use of public money. However, he opposed social welfare programs to give away houses to the poor at public expense as unconstitutional. In 1955, the U.S. Senate initiated a groundbreaking bill which authorized the construction of 540,000 public housing units over four years. Capehart, believing the bill was socialistic in nature, and lacking enough support to kill it, introduced an amendment which would have reduced the authorization to 35,000 units. Although Capehart thought he had enough votes to pass his amendment (even going so far as to tell majority leader Lyndon Johnson on the morning of the vote, "this time I'm going to rub your nose in shit"), his amendment was defeated by last-minute maneuvering engineered by Johnson. Capehart voted in favor of the Senate amendment to the Civil Rights Act of 1957 on August 7, 1957, but did not vote on the House amendment to the bill on August 29, 1957. Capehart voted in favor of the Civil Rights Act of 1960, but did not vote on the 24th Amendment to the U.S. Constitution.

Capehart was also an advocate of clean air legislation, and briefly served on the United States Senate Select Committee on Improper Activities in Labor and Management with Kennedy, Barry Goldwater, and Karl Mundt.

== Later life ==
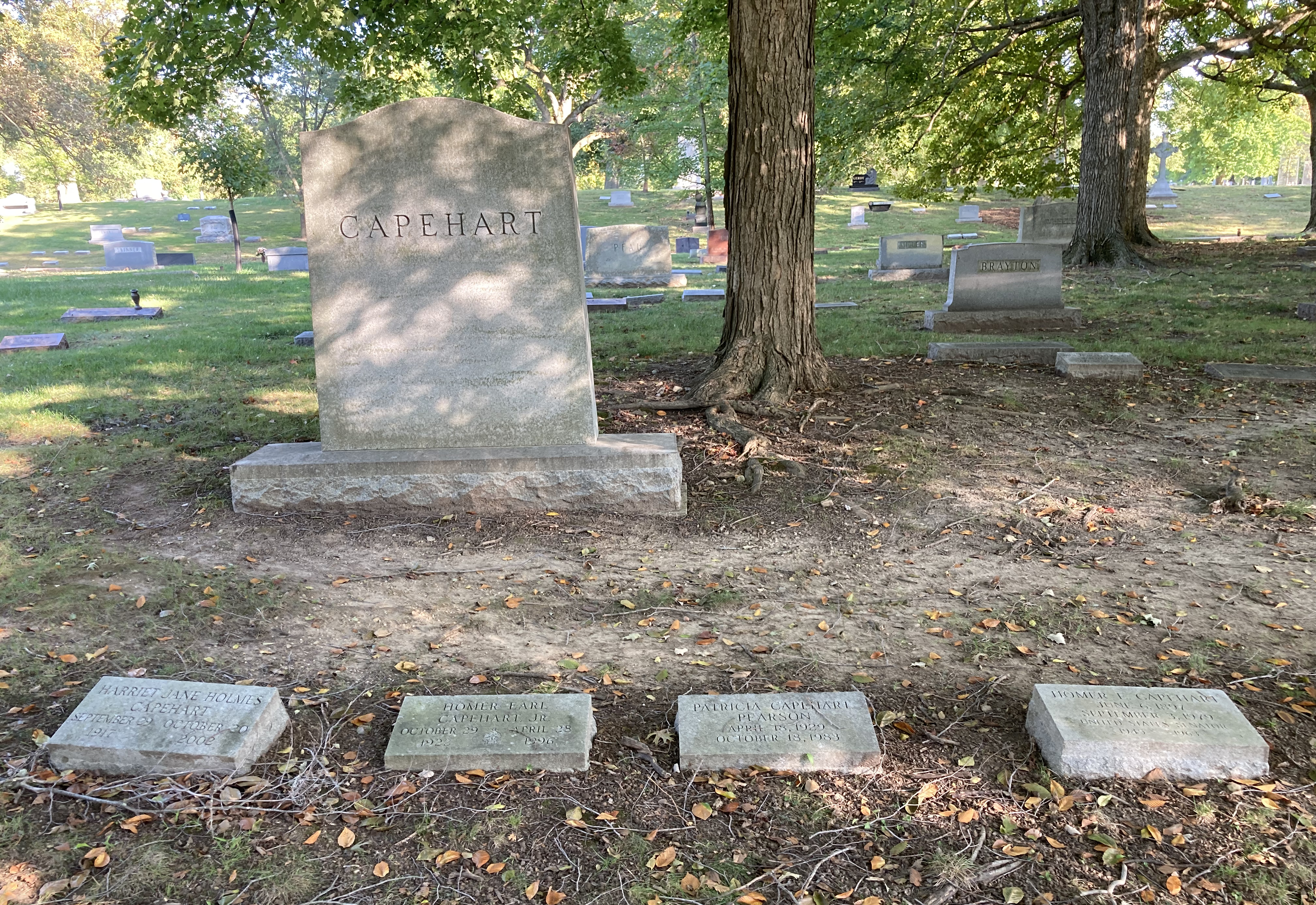
Capehart's grave at Crown Hill Cemetery

In the 1962 election, Capehart was narrowly defeated by 34-year-old Birch Bayh. He retired to his farming and business interests in Indiana, occasionally returning to Washington to provide both foreign policy and domestic-issue advice; jaded by the Watergate scandal, he became increasingly critical of President Richard Nixon.

Capehart died at age 82 at St. Vincent Hospital in Indianapolis in 1979 and is buried at its Crown Hill Cemetery.

He is honored (along with Indiana Senator Sherman Minton) in the Minton-Capehart Federal Building near the Indiana World War Memorial Plaza in downtown Indianapolis. His name is also memorialized in the Capehart Room in the Old Dorm Block of Reed College, which once contained a record player that Capehart had donated to the college.

Both his son Thomas C. Capehart and daughter-in-law were killed aboard Avianca Flight 671 on January 21, 1960.

Party political offices
Preceded by William E. Jenner	Republican nominee for U.S. Senator from Indiana (Class 3); 1944, 1950, 1956, 1962	Succeeded by William Ruckelshaus
U.S. Senate
Preceded by William E. Jenner	United States Senator (Class 3) from Indiana; 1945–1963	Succeeded by Birch Bayh
