= Ralph F. Gates =

American politician

Ralph Fesler Gates
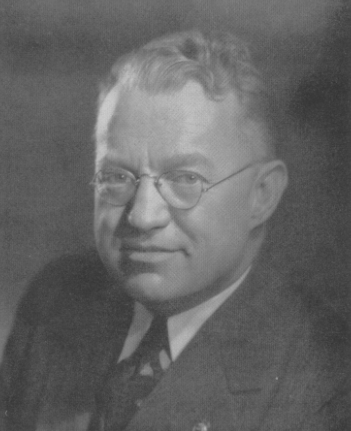

37th Governor of Indiana
- In office January 8, 1945 – January 10, 1949
- Lieutenant: Richard T. James
- Preceded by: Henry F. Schricker
- Succeeded by: Henry F. Schricker

Personal details
- Born: February 24, 1893 Columbia City, Indiana, U.S.
- Died: July 28, 1978 (aged 85) Columbia City, Indiana, U.S.
- Party: Republican
- Spouse: Helene Edwards
- Children: 2
- Education: University of Michigan

Ralph Fesler Gates (February 24, 1893 – July 28, 1978) was an American politician who served as the 37th governor of Indiana from 1945 to 1949. A lawyer and veteran of World War I, he is credited with returning his party to power after the Ku Klux Klan scandal in the late 1920s that led to years of Democratic dominance of the state government during the Great Depression. His term in office focused primarily on encouraging economic growth as World War II ended through the improvement of the state highway system, education reform, and offering incentives for industrial growth. After leaving office he remained active as a leader in the state Republican Party until his death.

== Early life ==
=== Family and background ===
Ralph Gates was born in Columbia City, Indiana, on February 24, 1893, the first son of Benton E. and Alice Fesler Gates. Gates had three younger brothers; John, Scott, and Benton. His father was a local banker, an attorney, and chaired the county Republican Party for ten years. To earn an income as a boy, Gates delivered newspapers and became acquainted with Thomas R. Marshall, who later became Vice President of the United States. Gates attended public school in Columbia City and graduated from high school in 1911. He attended the University of Michigan where he earned a bachelor's degree in 1915 and law degree in 1917.

After the United States entered World War I, Gates enlisted in the United States Navy in September 1917. He was mustered in as an ensign and assigned to the Pay Corps, which was responsible to managing the payroll of the navy. In December he was promoted to lieutenant and transferred overseas to work in the War Risk Insurance Bureau based in Ireland where he was employed to sell bonds to insure government war assets. He personally sold over $1 million in bonds, almost entirely to naval personnel. In April 1919 he was transferred to France where he was placed in command of an airbase that was being constructed. The base was finished just as the war ended and Gates was offered a position in the Belgian relief effort, but he turned down the offer so he could go home.

=== Early political career ===
After he returned to Indiana, he began practicing law in his father's firm. He soon met Helene Edwards of South Whitley, a local school teacher in Muncie. The couple was married on October 30, 1919, and purchased a home in Columbia City where they lived the rest of their lives. They had two children, Robert and Patricia. Gates' father soon brought him into the family banking business where he served as a manager in the Farmer's Loan and Trust Bank. Gates first held political office in 1920 when he became the attorney for Whitley County. He became the town attorney for South Whitley in 1922, a position he held until 1944. He also served as attorney for Columbia City from 1927 through 1929. The Ku Klux Klan dominated the state government during the 1920s and Gates, thanks to his father's advice, was among the few office holders in his region who did not become involved with the secret organization. The Klan was exposed in a scandal in 1927 that led to a near collapse of the state Republican Party.

With the onset of the Great Depression in 1929, the family bank entered a period of financial difficulty. Gates and his brothers were able to successfully meet with each of the banks depositors and convince them to sign non-withdrawal pledges. Thanks to their cooperation, the family was able to preserve the bank and made it one of the few in the region to avoid a bank run. In 1928 he succeeded his father as the chairman of the Whitley County Republican Party and served as a delegate to the Republican National Convention. In 1931 Gates became the Indiana commander of the American Legion. The position led him to travel around the state and meet with many state leaders as he lobbied for veterans.

Gates continued to grow in popularity and power among the state party. He served again as a delegate to the national conventions in 1936 and in 1940. In 1941 he became the chairman of the state Republican Party where he immediately set to work to strengthen it and return it to power. He was known as a "master politician" and soon began to cull from the party leadership the last vestiges of the old progressive movement and those willing to compromise with the Democrats. He personally oversaw the reorganization of each county party in the state on the model of the Whitely County party.

== Governor ==
=== Campaign ===
In 1944 Gates used his influence to secure a unanimous nomination at the state convention to run for Governor of Indiana. At the same convention, by Gates' design, Homer E. Capehart and William E. Jenner were nominated to run for the U.S. House of Representatives and the United States Senate respectively. The three men were deeply conservative, but Jenners was the most "rigidly ideological" of the three, leading to growing differences between him and Gates. Jenners gave the keynote address at the convention which set the tone for the campaign. He attacked President Franklin Roosevelt and the national Democratic Party for their failures during the Great Depression and their domination of both the state and federal government, but urged the party to support the ongoing World War II war effort. Gates supported Jenners' position, and in his speech attacked the state Democratic Party, calling them puppets of the Roosevelt administration claiming they took their orders from Washington and not citizens of Indiana.

After the convention Gates returned home where a parade had been organized in his honor in Columbia City. He launched his campaign after the parade and began traveling around the state to stump. He spent considerable time in traditionally Democratic southern Indiana in hopes that he could win over their support. In all of his speeches he used the term "a local problem can best be solved by local government." He also continued to charge that leadership of the state had been abandoned to federal government and that Republicans could remedy the situation. Gates and his Democratic opponent, Samuel D. Jackson, did not hold any debates or travel to make joint appearances. The Republican party platform paid off and Gates defeated Jackson by more than 46,000 votes. Republicans also took a large two-thirds majorities in both houses of the Indiana General Assembly.

=== Promoting economic growth ===
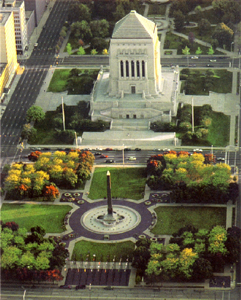
The Indiana World War Memorial, made available by Gates as a new headquarters for the American Legion.

Portrait of Gates.

In Gates inaugural address he called on each branch of the government to do its job and not to interfere with the other branches. He promised not to abuse the executive authority, and the speech successfully ended what had become a fifteen-year battle between the legislature, the governor, and the Indiana Supreme Court over who held the final power to control the state bureaucracy. Gates announced he would focus on three main areas while he served as governor; industrial growth, highway construction, and improved health care. He also urged the legislature to reform state taxes and spending and predicted a fall in tax revenues as the war ended.

Gates became friends with Josiah K. Lilly Jr. the President of Eli Lilly and Company. Lilly advised Gates on a number of health care reforms and successfully lobbied Gates to support the construction of three new state-run mental hospital for the insane. The departments of revenue, veterans affairs, and commerce were all created at Gates urging during his term. He also successfully advocated the creation of Shades State Park. Teacher's wages were raised statewide, the Bureau of Motor Vehicles was reorganized to hire employees using the state merit system, and a retirement fund for state employees was started. To fund the new initiatives, excise taxes were raised on beer, liquor, and cigarettes. Using his connections in the American Legion, Gates was instrumental in influencing the organization to move its national headquarters from Washington, D.C., to Indianapolis and providing it office space in the World War Memorial building which was expanded to accommodate them.

Gates' position on highway construction came to be at odds with the more conservative wing of the party. The federal government offered matching funds to the state to build certain highways, but they feared taking the money would be seen as a sign of going back on their promise to not let the federal government influence them. Gates insisted that it was in the best interest of the state to accept the money and build the highways, but legislature failed to act on his recommendation. Jenners had been behind the movement to stop the highway construction bill, and Gates retaliated by planning to block Jenners from winning the nomination to run for governor in 1948. The Constitution of Indiana prevented governors from serving consecutive terms, barring Gates from running for office again. However, he still controlled the state party and at the state convention in 1948, he was able to unite the three factions opposing Jenners to deny him the nomination. Jenners, who had a two-hundred vote lead in the first ballot, was outraged and never forgave Gates.

Gates played a key role in the establishment of Chain O'Lakes State Park in Noble County. He promoted the cause of establishing the park even after leaving office. In 1960, when the park was established, Gates spoke at the opening ceremony.

== Later life ==
=== Party leader ===
When Gates left office he resumed his duties as chairman of the state party, and also served at different times in the national party as a member of the Republican National Committee. He met with Robert A. Taft in 1952 and was offered the chance to run for Vice President of the United States, but he declined. The same year party leaders tried to nominate him to run for governor again, but he refused. Although he never ran for office again, his support and backing proved critical to Republicans for many years in gaining party nominations. Richard Lugar was among the last men he helped secure the party's Senate nomination for. He continued offering political advice until 1976 when told a reporter that the national party made a mistake in choosing Gerald Ford over Ronald Reagan for the 1976 president nomination, and that Jimmy Carter was "well intentioned, but had no grasp of politics."

=== Death and legacy ===
Gates and his wife remained living in their Columbia City home, the same he had purchased in 1919. They also purchased a cottage on Crooked Lake just outside the town where they spent considerable time in the summer. He became an American Civil War enthusiast and collected a large number of books on the subject. After retiring from his law practice he also spent considerable time gardening. He died of natural causes on July 28, 1978. Only a private service was held after his death because of his request for only a simple ceremony where his favorite song, "Onward Christian Soldiers" was played. Indiana State Road 205, which runs from Garrett, through Churubusco and Columbia City, before ending in South Whitley, is called the Ralph F. Gates Memorial Highway.

As a governor, Gates was responsible for helping the state to successfully transition from a war to peace time economy. He is best remembered as an important Republican Party leader, who rebuilt the party following its near collapse after the KKK scandal in the late 1920s, and his continued role in the party after his time as governor.

The Ralph F. Gates Nature Preserve at Crooked Lake near the Whitley - Noble county line was given to ACRES Land Trust, Inc. in 1977 by Phil and Patricia McNagny.

A public dedication of an Indiana state historical marker commemorating Governor Ralph Fesler Gates was held on July 2, 2013, at 1:15 pm on the Whitley County Courthouse north lawn in Columbia City, Indiana.

== See also ==
- List of governors of Indiana

Party political offices
Preceded by Glenn R. Hillis	Republican nominee for Governor of Indiana; 1944	Succeeded by Hobart Creighton
Political offices
Preceded by Henry F. Schricker	Governor of Indiana; January 8, 1945 - January 10, 1949	Succeeded by Henry F. Schricker
