= Henry F. Schricker =

American politician (1883–1966)

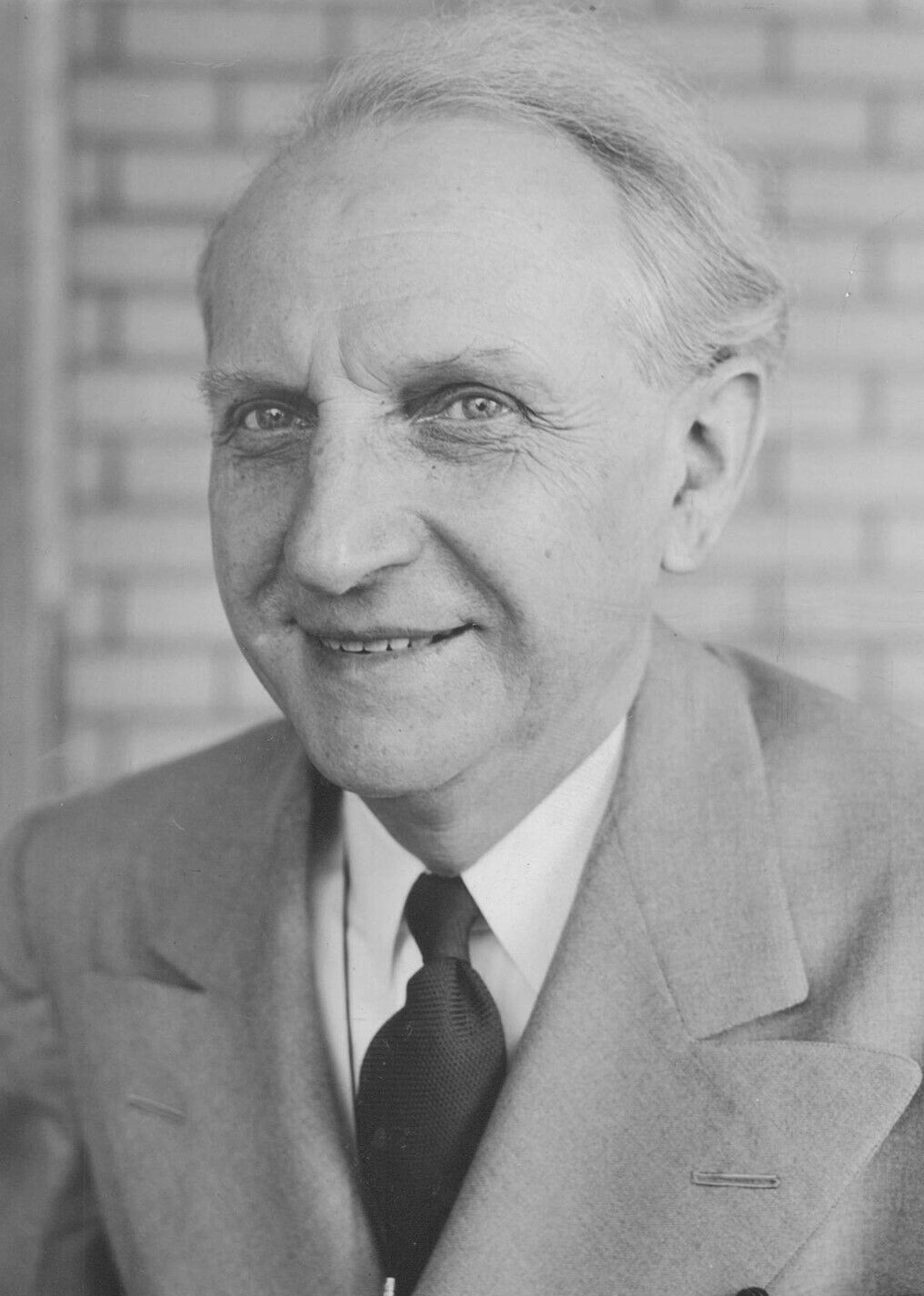
- Schricker in 1944

36th & 38th Governor of Indiana
- In office January 10, 1949 – January 12, 1953
- Lieutenant: John A. Watkins; Rue J. Alexander
- Preceded by: Ralph F. Gates
- Succeeded by: George N. Craig
- In office January 13, 1941 – January 8, 1945
- Lieutenant: Charles M. Dawson
- Preceded by: M. Clifford Townsend
- Succeeded by: Ralph F. Gates

34th Lieutenant Governor of Indiana
- In office January 13, 1937 – January 8, 1941
- Governor: M. Clifford Townsend
- Preceded by: M. Clifford Townsend
- Succeeded by: Charles M. Dawson

Indiana State Senator for LaPorte County and Starke County
- In office November 9, 1932 – November 4, 1936
- Preceded by: Noah Earl Rowley
- Succeeded by: Oliver Parr Cannon

Personal details
- Born: August 30, 1883 North Judson, Indiana, U.S.
- Died: December 28, 1966 (aged 83) Knox, Indiana, U.S.
- Resting place: Crown Hill Cemetery Knox, Indiana
- Party: Democratic
- Spouse: Maude L. Brown (m. 1914)
- Profession: Newspaper publisher, Lawyer

Henry Frederick Schricker (August 30, 1883 – December 28, 1966) was an American politician who served as the 36th and 38th governor of Indiana from 1941 to 1945 and from 1949 to 1953. He is the only Indiana governor elected to two non-consecutive terms, and the only governor between 1852 and 1977 to be elected to more than one term in office. His terms were marked by strong opposition party control of the Indiana General Assembly, which attempted to remove powers from the governor that had been granted during the Great Depression. Schricker fought the attempt in the state courts, and although his power was significantly reduced, the Indiana Supreme Court ruled in the case of Tucker v. Indiana that the governor was the chief executive of the state, and the legislature could not pass legislation that interfered with the division of powers.

== Family and background ==
Schricker was born in North Judson, Indiana, on August 30, 1883, to Bavarian immigrants Christoph and Magdelena (Meyer) Schricker. He attended a Lutheran parochial school in North Judson to elementary school and attended a public school and completed grade eight. After graduation, he began working in his family's grocery store as a bookkeeper. His parents sent him to a local college to take a course in bookkeeping as the final step in his education. After working in the grocery store for nine years, Schricker decided to become a lawyer and worked toward that goal by taking a position in the Starke County clerk's office in Knox, Indiana.

After a year of studying law on the side, he passed the bar examination and began practicing law in Knox with his mentor, Adrian Courtright. He became the cashier of the Hamlet bank in 1907.and became the owner, publisher, and editor of the Starke County Democrat in 1908. He was actively involved in the community, organizing the first Boy Scout troop in Starke County in 1912 and presiding as the chief of the Knox Fire Department. It was also during this time that Henry met Maude Brown, a teacher in North Dakota, who had originally come from Knox. In 1914, she finished her five years proving the homestead in North Dakota, and returned to Knox, Indiana, resulting in their marriage on October 21, 1914. In 1919, he returned to his previous career and became the cashier of the First National Bank of Knox.

== Legislator ==
Schricker's first entry into politics was his run for the Indiana Senate in 1924 as a Democrat. After losing the race, he retained his cashier position and continued there until 1932, when he again ran and won. During his term in the Indiana Senate, he drafted legislation to create a new circuit court district for Starke County. Another important bill he created was one to create a tenure system for state teachers, which guaranteed the teachers they would remain employed by the state upon completing a certain number of years in state service. A third bill created a pension fund for firemen in the state. All three bills were passed and signed into law.

== Lieutenant governor ==
He was nominated to run again for re-election to the Senate in 1936, but turned down the nomination after Governor Paul V. McNutt arranged for the convention to nominate him to run for Lieutenant Governor of Indiana, on a ticket with M. Clifford Townsend. McNutt was considered to be significantly more conservative than Townsend, and party leaders believed Schricker would help draw more Republican votes. Townsend and Schricker won the election and took office in January 1937.

As President of the Democratic-controlled Senate, Schricker helped pass welfare measures supported by Townsend. As lieutenant governor, he was also head of the state's agricultural department and spent considerable time traveling around the state for meetings with leaders of farming communities. The state party was in the midst of a dispute during his term, with the McNutt and Frederick Van Nuys faction opposing President Franklin D. Roosevelt's plan to stack the US Supreme Court. Roosevelt intervened in the state party affairs, and with the support of Townsend, he attempted to remove the state's senators, who were blocking his plan. Schricker did not takes sides in the debate, which McNutt ultimately won, but tried to avoid the Capitol. His traveling effectively turned into a four-year campaign for the governorship as he gained support around the state.

At the 1940 state Democratic Party Convention, Schricker won the nomination for governor on the second ballot, winning the majority of the delegates from the rural parts of the state. Opinion had turned strongly against the Democrats in the last year, primarily over welfare spending. To win the election, Schricker focused on his personal popularity rather than his connection to the party. He won the election by fewer than 4,000 votes and was the only Democrat elected in any statewide election. Republicans swept to power and took strong majorities in the General Assembly for the first time in 15 years. Part of the Republican platform had been to remove the state from the federal welfare system, revoke the massive increase in power granted to the governor by the Executive Reorganization Act, and cut spending and taxes.

== Governor ==
=== First term ===
Schricker's official portrait from his first term as governor

As Schricker took office in January 1941, the battle with the General Assembly was inevitable. Once convened the assembly immediately repealed the Executive Reorganization Act, stripping the governor of his direct authority over numerous government agencies and his authority to appoint officials, which reverted to the Assembly. Schricker openly supported the repeal of the act, stating he had no desire for "dictatorial powers". However, when the bill arrived to be signed into law, he vetoed it claiming that as it was written it would reduce his status to that of an "errand boy." Only a simple majority was required to override his veto, which the assembly promptly did.

Republicans soon continued their attempt limit the governor's power and passed the State Administration Act of 1941. The bill reorganized the state into five administrative departments, with only the smallest, which consisted of the governor's aides, remaining under the direct authority of the governor. The other four agencies were to be placed under the control of three-member boards of commissioners. The boards would consist of the governor and two commissioners appointed by the Assembly. The arrangement would effectively give the Assembly the ability to manage the departments. Schricker vetoed the bill when it reached his desk, but his veto was again overridden. When the Assembly adjourned in April, Schricker filed a suit in the state courts, claiming the bill violated the division of powers. The Marion County Circuit Court stayed the law until the matter could be reviewed by the Indiana Supreme Court.

Indiana Secretary of State James M. Tucker, a Republican, filed a countersuit claiming the state courts had no authority to stay an act of the legislature, and accusing the court of violating the division of powers. Tucker v. State came before the Supreme Court, which ruled that the governor was the chief executive of the state, and the legislature could not pass legislation that infringed upon that power. It declared, 4–1, the State Administration Act to be unconstitutional, on party lines.

Schricker refused to call a special session of the General Assembly. The legislature was unable to reconvene until 1943 when it promptly passed a bill to reform the patronage system and transferred most of the state's agencies to the merit system already employed in some agencies. It also took over the Two Percent Fund, which required all state employees to contribute two percent of their income to a fund that supported the Democratic Party. By creating a board to oversee the fund, they guaranteed that it would be split equally between both parties. Schricker vetoed the bill, but the legislature again overrode it.

In 1944, Schricker was mentioned as a candidate for vice president; Indiana Democrats were opposed to the renomination of incumbent Henry A. Wallace, and suggested that because he was from a midwestern state that often supported Republicans, the selection of Schricker could effectively counter the Republican vice presidential selection, Ohio Governor John W. Bricker. Despite the mentions in the press, Shricker made no effort to run for vice president; at the Democratic National Convention, the Indiana delegation, led by Schricker, attempted unsuccessfully to generate support for Paul V. McNutt or Sherman Minton as an alternative to Wallace or the favorite to succeed him, Harry S. Truman. When support for McNutt or Minton failed to materialize, the Indiana delegation supported Truman. Prevented by law from running for reelection to a consecutive term as governor, Schricker was nominated to run for the United States Senate. The race was hard-fought, but Schricker lost to Homer E. Capehart by 48.9% to 50.2% of the vote.

=== Second term ===
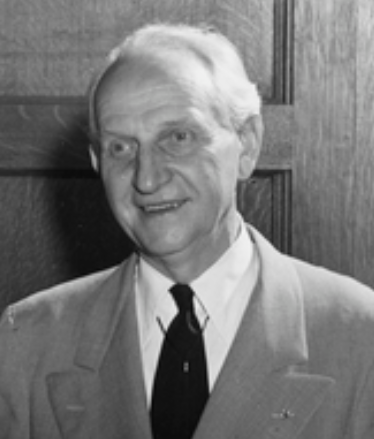
Schricker in 1953

Schricker returned to private life by joining the American Fletcher National Bank and Trust Company of Indianapolis. However, he ran for the governorship again in 1948 and won, becoming Indiana's first governor to be elected to two non-consecutive terms, and the second to serve non-consecutive terms. During the Kentucky Derby weekend in 1949, Schricker authorized a crackdown on illegal gambling in Orange County, Indiana, near the French Lick Springs Hotel.

Democrats held a small majority in the General Assembly during Schricker's first two years in office, but in the midterms, Republicans again took power. They passed legislation to make public the names of welfare recipients and the amounts received. This was in violation of federal welfare laws and would have resulted in a loss of federal funding for the state welfare system. Schricker vetoed the bill, but the legislature overrode his veto. The federal government immediately cut off funding, creating an $18 million budget deficit for the state. Schricker called a special session of the legislature to resolve the financial situation, but no solution could be agreed upon. Instead, the legislators passed a bill that delayed the opening of the public welfare records by two years. Meanwhile, Senator William E. Jenner successfully introduced legislation at the federal level to prevent the state from losing its funding once the bill took effect.

Schricker left office with the state having a $115 million surplus fund due to frugal spending and his own support of the spending plans. The state's highway system, public schools, and prisons suffered during the years because of their neglect. After leaving office, Schricker cofounded the Wabash Fire and Casualty Insurance Company of Indianapolis.

== Later years ==
Schricker was a popular Hoosier politician known for his charm of a small-town boy and his signature white hat. He was in demand as a speaker, and his advice and sanction were sought by Democratic candidates. He received national recognition when he was chosen to deliver the joint nomination speech for Adlai Stevenson at the Democratic National Convention in 1952. The same year, Schricker again ran for the U. S. Senate and again lost to the Republican incumbent, Jenner, this time by 5.6%. He retired to Knox in 1960 but remained active in civic affairs and played a role as himself in the 1950 movie Johnny Holiday. He died on December 28, 1966.

== See also ==
- List of governors of Indiana

Party political offices
Preceded by M. Clifford Townsend	Democratic nominee for Governor of Indiana; 1940	Succeeded by Samuel D. Jackson
Preceded by Cornelius O'Brien	Democratic nominee for U.S. Senator from Indiana (Class 3); 1944	Succeeded by Alexander M. Campbell
Preceded by Samuel D. Jackson	Democratic nominee for Governor of Indiana; 1948	Succeeded by John A. Watkins
Preceded by M. Clifford Townsend	Democratic nominee for U.S. Senator from Indiana (Class 1); 1952	Succeeded by Vance Hartke
Political offices
Preceded by M. Clifford Townsend	Lieutenant Governor of Indiana; January 13, 1937 – January 8, 1941	Succeeded by Charles M. Dawson
Preceded by M. Clifford Townsend	Governor of Indiana; January 13, 1941 – January 8, 1945	Succeeded by Ralph F. Gates
Preceded by Ralph F. Gates	Governor of Indiana; January 10, 1949 – January 12, 1953	Succeeded by George N. Craig
