= Governor of Indiana =

Head of government of Indiana

- Seal of the State of Indiana

- State flag

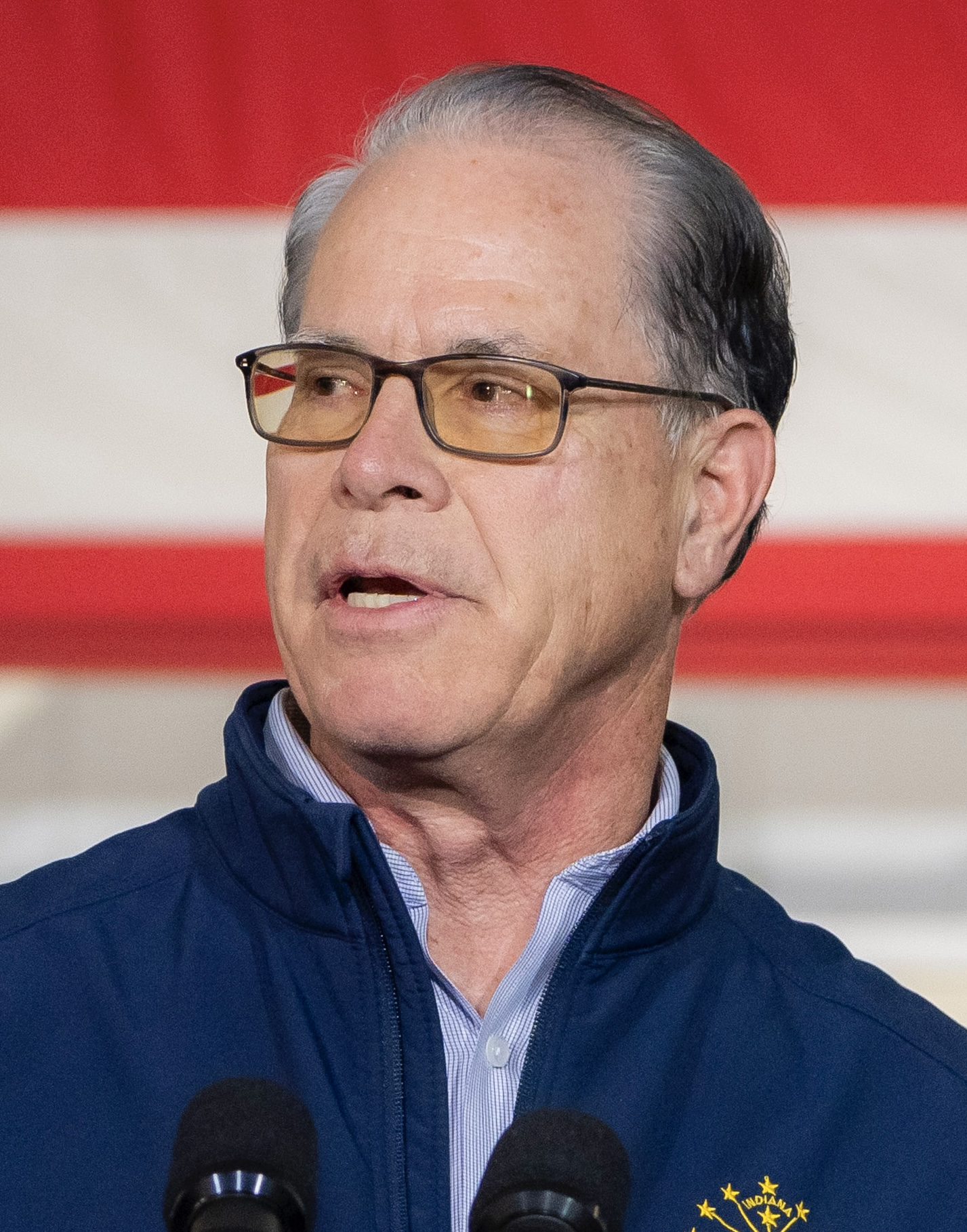
- Incumbent; Mike Braun since January 13, 2025
- Government of Indiana
- Residence: Indiana Governor's Residence
- Term length: Four years, renewable once in a 12-year period
- Inaugural holder: Jonathan Jennings
- Formation: November 7, 1816
- Succession: Line of succession
- Deputy: Lieutenant Governor of Indiana
- Salary: $221,024 (2025)
- Website: in.gov/gov

The governor of Indiana is the head of government of the U.S. state of Indiana. The governor is elected to a four-year term and is responsible for overseeing the day-to-day management of the functions of many agencies of the Indiana state government. The governor also shares power with other statewide executive officers, who manage other state government agencies. The governor works out of the Indiana Statehouse and holds official functions at the Indiana Governor's Residence in the state capital of Indianapolis.

The 52nd, and current, governor is Republican Mike Braun, who took office on January 13, 2025.

The position of the governor has developed over the course of two centuries. It has become considerably more powerful since the mid-20th century after decades of struggle with the Indiana General Assembly and Indiana Supreme Court to establish the executive branch of the government as an equal third branch of the state government. Although gubernatorial powers were again significantly expanded by constitutional amendments during the 1970s, Indiana governors remain significantly less powerful than their counterparts in most other states.

== Office ==
=== Authority ===
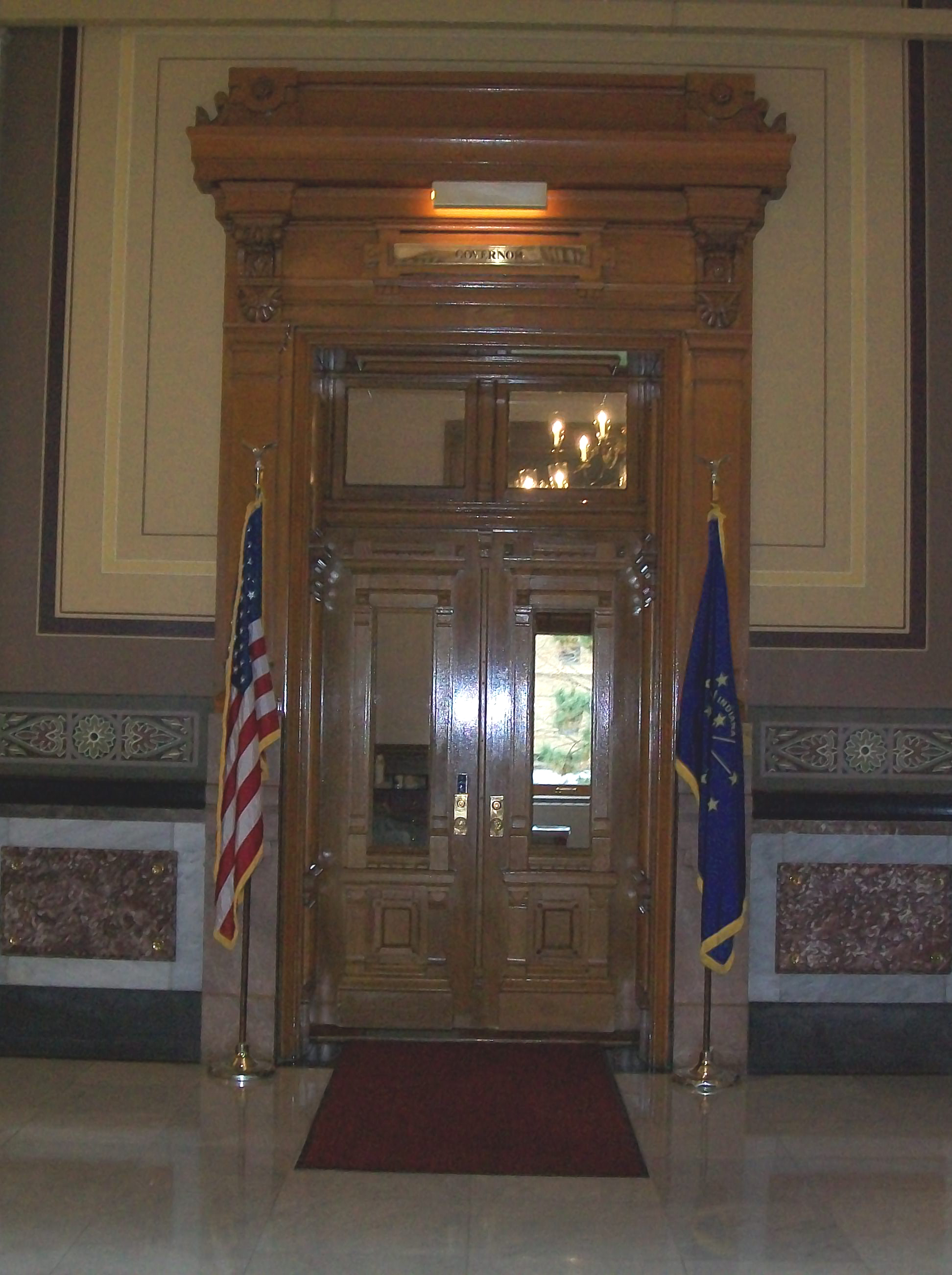
The entrance to the governor's office in 2009

The governor's powers are established in Article V of the Constitution of Indiana. Constitutionally, the governor has very limited executive authority to manage the government of the state; most exercisable powers over state agencies are held by independently elected cabinet heads.

The governor works in concert with the state legislature (the bicameral Indiana General Assembly, consisting of the Indiana House of Representatives and the Indiana Senate) and the state supreme court (the Indiana Supreme Court) to govern the state. The governor has the power to veto legislation passed by the General Assembly. If vetoed, a bill is returned to the General Assembly for reconsideration. Unlike other states, most of which require a two-thirds supermajority to override a veto, the Indiana General Assembly may override the veto with an absolute majority vote in both chambers.

One of the governor's most important political powers is the ability to call a special session of the General Assembly. During a two-year period, the assembly can meet on its own for no more than 91 days, and this often prevents them from passing all the legislation they intend to. This can give the governor considerable influence in the body which will often compromise on issues with him in exchange for a special legislative session.

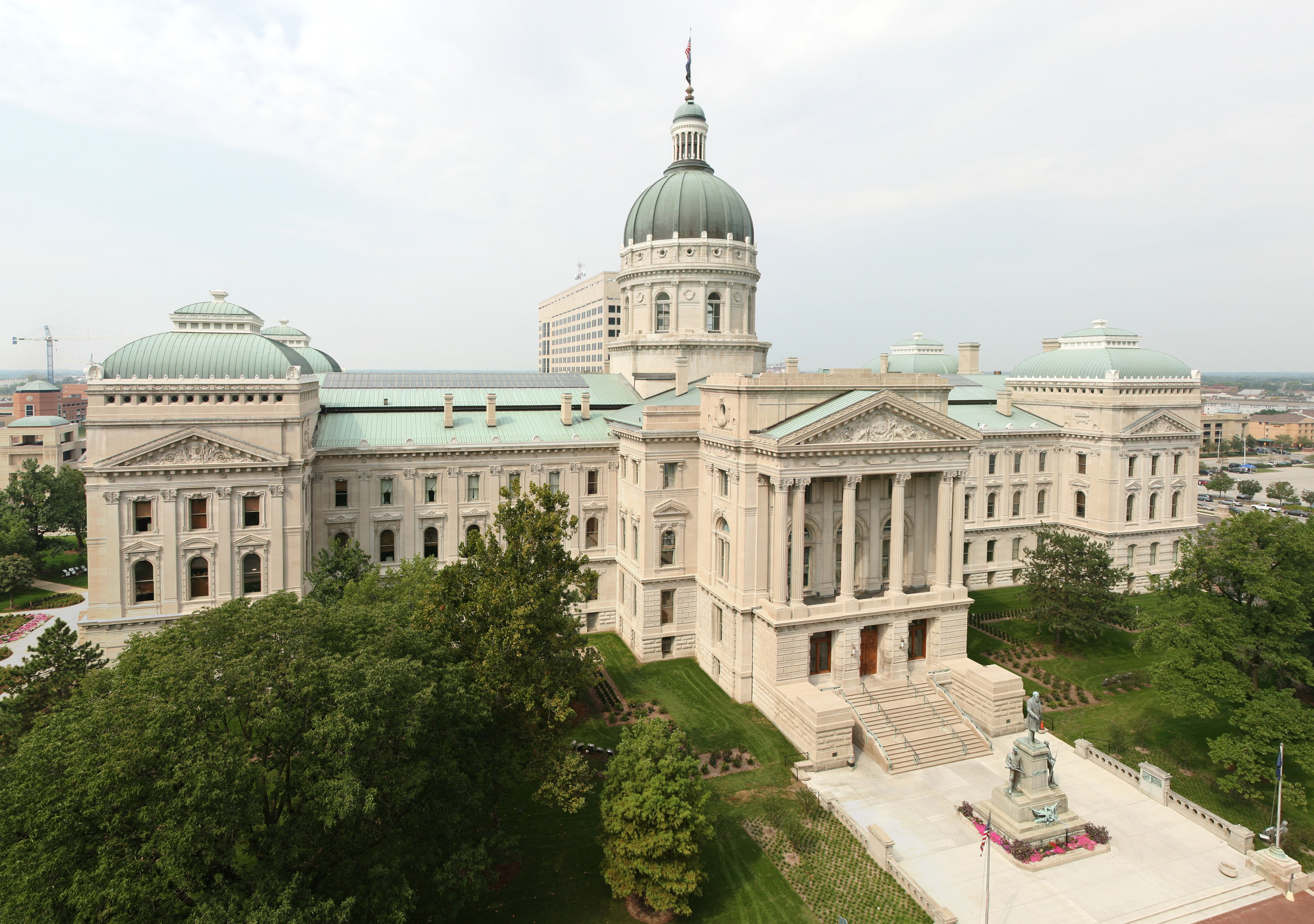
The Indiana Statehouse, where the governor's office is located

Among his other powers, the governor can call out the state defense force (the Indiana Guard Reserve) or the Indiana National Guard in times of emergency or disaster. The governor is also charged with the enforcement of all the state's laws and the Indiana Code through the Indiana State Police. The governor also has the ability to grant a pardon or commutation of sentence of any person convicted of a crime in the state, except in cases of treason or impeachment.

In addition to constitutional powers, governors also have a considerable degree of statutory authority. Most of the authority exercised by governors on a daily basis is derived from statute, giving the General Assembly a great degree of power to expand or contract the governor's authority. Historically, the party in control of the General Assembly would reassign control of agencies from the governor or to the governor based upon party affiliation, and the party affiliation of the cabinet heads, which at times has left the governor with no direct control over state agencies.

The governor also can influence the state court system through the appointment of judges. In Indiana, when vacancies occur on the Supreme Court, Tax Court, and circuit courts, the Judicial Nominating Commission interviews candidates and sends a list of three candidates for each vacancy to the governor, who chooses one. Circuit court judges and Superior court judges are elected in Indiana; if a vacancy occurs (such as by death or resignation) the governor may make an appointment, who holds the office until the next general election. The authority to make such appointments gives the governor considerable sway in setting the makeup of the judiciary.

The annual salary of the governor of Indiana is US$134,051 (2021). Additionally, he receives $6,000 annually for discretionary spending and expenses.

=== Requirements ===
To become governor of Indiana, a candidate must be a citizen of the United States and must have been a resident of the state in which they are running for the period of five consecutive years before the election. The candidate must also be at least 30 years old when sworn into office. The governor may not hold any other state or federal office during his term and must resign from any such position before being eligible to be sworn in as governor. Before taking the office, the candidate must swear an oath of office administered by the Chief Justice of the Indiana Supreme Court, promising to uphold the Constitution and laws of the United States of America and the State of Indiana.

=== Term limits ===
The governor serves a four-year term beginning on the date he is sworn into office; inauguration day is the second Monday in January. He remains governor until his successor takes the oath of office. The governor's term can be shorter if he resigns, dies, becomes incapacitated or impeached. There is no limit to how many terms a governor may serve; however, the governor is limited to serving a total of eight years in any 12-year period, equivalent to two full terms. To be eligible to run for a third term, the governor would have to sit out for one election period.

=== Succession ===
If the governor becomes incapacitated, then the lieutenant governor of Indiana becomes acting governor until his recovery. Only two governors have become incapacitated during their terms, and the current precedent is that the governor's office is to notify the lieutenant governor, who will then make the decision to become acting governor by notifying the General Assembly by letter. The governor can resume his powers and duties by sending a letter to the General Assembly notifying them that he is again capable of executing the duties of office. If the governor resigns, dies, or is impeached, tried, and convicted, then the lieutenant governor ascends as governor. If the office of the lieutenant governor is vacant, then the president pro tempore of the Senate becomes governor. If the office of Senate President Pro Tempore is also vacant, then the Senate must elect a replacement to fill the governor's office.

=== Residence and offices ===
The governor maintains an office on the first floor of the Indiana Statehouse in Indianapolis, and from there he manages all of the state's agencies that are under his jurisdiction. He shares the building with the Indiana General Assembly and the Supreme Court of Indiana. The other elected executive officers, including the attorney general and the lieutenant governor, are also located in the statehouse, but most of the state's bureaus are located in the state office building. Traditionally, the governor lives in the Indiana Governor's Residence, also located in Indianapolis; however, former governor Mitchell Daniels' family maintained their private home, using the Governor's Residence only for official functions.

== History ==
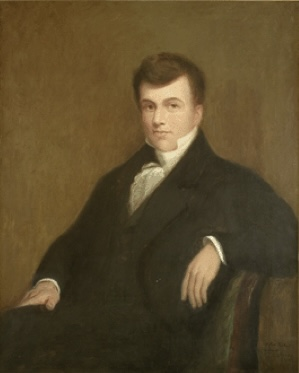
Jonathan Jennings, 1st Governor of Indiana and seven term Congressman

=== Governors ===
The first governor of Indiana, Jonathan Jennings, was elected in August 1816 and assumed office in December of that year. The first capital was in Corydon, and the first three governors maintained homes and offices there. The capital was moved to Indianapolis in December 1824. Governors originally served three-years terms until the constitution was replaced in 1851. The 1851 constitution extended terms to four years but banned governors from serving consecutive terms. The constitution was amended again in 1972 to allow governors to serve consecutive terms but limited them to two consecutive terms at a time.

There have been 51 governors of Indiana. 23 Republicans and 21 Democrats have each held the position. Four have died while in office; seven have resigned. Ten lieutenant governors have succeeded to become governor. James B. Ray has been the only president of the Senate pro tempore to assume the office of governor.

Jonathan Jennings was the first governor to have an attempted impeachment brought against him in response to his actions as an agent of the federal government during the negotiations of the Treaty of St. Mary's in 1819, illegal under Indiana's constitution. The evidence of his role was destroyed, and after two months of investigation the proceedings were dropped. The only other time was when the General Assembly attempted to bring impeachment proceedings against Governor James B. Ray for a similar action in 1826, but the action was also defeated 28–30.

Three governors were elected Vice President of the United States, two while in office.

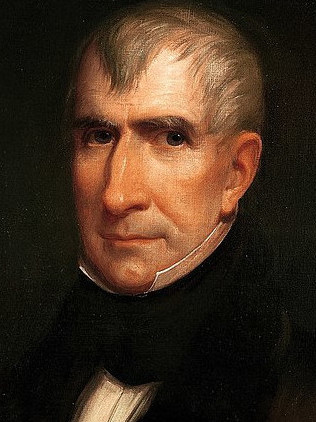
William Henry Harrison was the first territorial governor and the ninth president of the United States.

=== Power shifts ===
Historically, the office of Indiana's governor has been a weaker institution relative to the other branches of state government and also when compared to the role of governors of other U.S. states. During Indiana's territorial period, there was a considerable resentment to the power wielded by the territorial governors, and in response the anti-governor faction, which dominated the constitutional convention, created a weak executive position. The governor was not given complete authority over the militia, his term was set at three years, and most of his actions could be overridden by the General Assembly. The position was steadily weakened by the legislature, and his power was limited further by the constitution of 1851. The governor's authority to choose his own appointments for the state courts was removed, and the ability to appoint his own cabinet was ended. The cabinet was effectively made independent by making them elected popularly. The authority to propose budgets was revoked, and serving consecutive terms was banned. By comparison, the Supreme Court was made almost entirely independent, and the General Assembly assumed many of the powers taken from the governor.

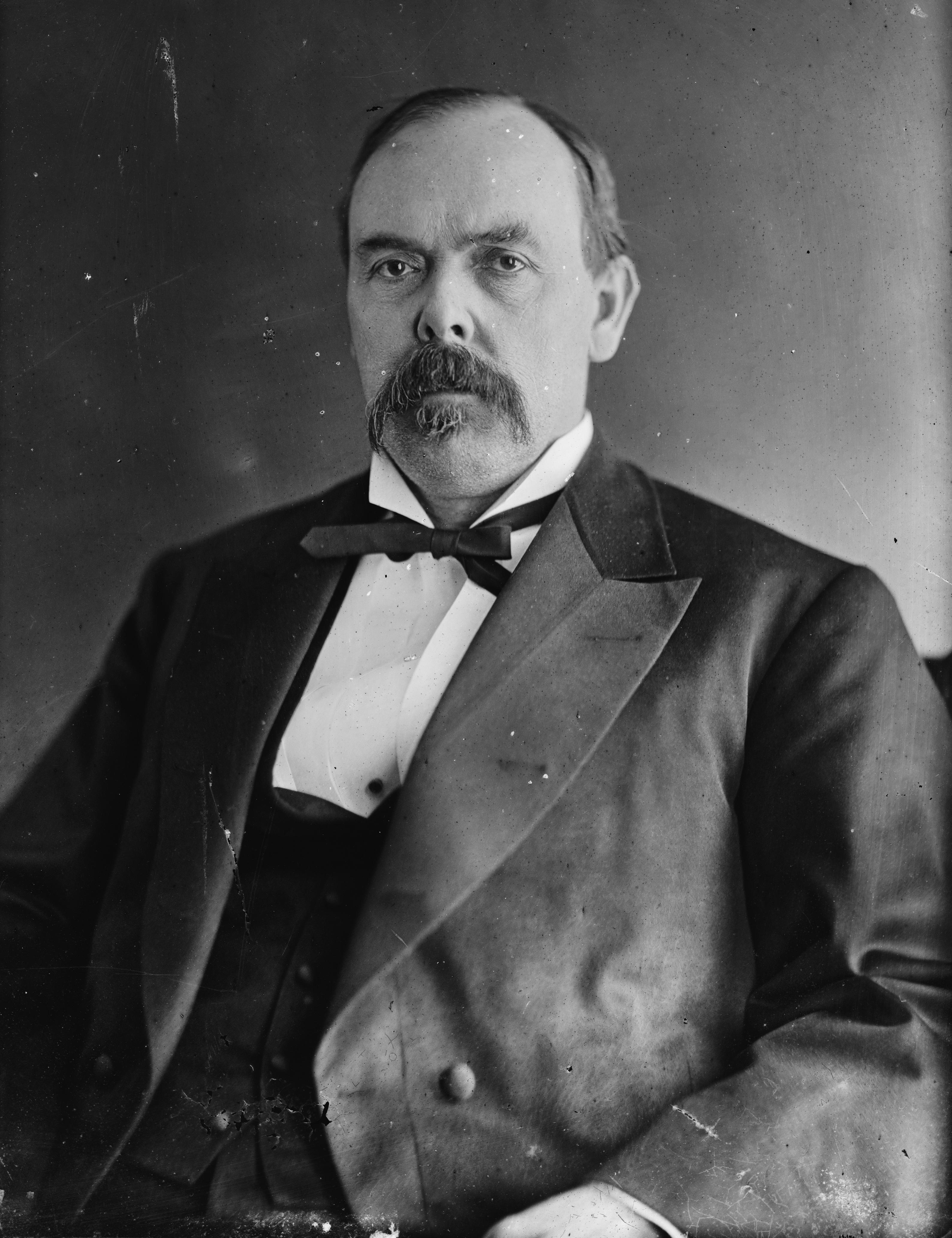
Governor of Indiana during the American Civil War, Oliver P. Morton

Governors first began to assert their own power during the American Civil War as the General Assembly attempted to remove command of the militia from the governor. In response, the General Assembly was effectively suppressed, during which time the governor assumed many powers to appoint public officials, hire and remove state employees, and manage state finances. When the General Assembly reconvened with a majority sympathetic to the governor, he was permitted to continue many of his assumed powers. In 1889, the General Assembly began to reassert its authority over hiring state employees. The issued ended when the Supreme Court ruled in favor of the legislature, again returning to it final authority over hiring state employees. The legislature passed acts in 1895 that removed the last of the governor's authority to appoint anyone to executive positions.

With the onset of the Great Depression in the 1930s, the governors again began to reassert authority. The Executive Reorganization Act was passed, returning the governor to a considerable level of appointment power. New state welfare and regulatory agencies were placed directly under the governor's control, greatly expanding his role in running the state and creating many patronage positions. The legislature responded by trying to create a merit system for public offices, but it was largely unable to effectively enforce it given the new scope of government agencies. The battle with the governor continued until 1941 when the legislature rescinded the Executive Reorganization Act and replaced it with the State Administration Act, which placed most of the government under the control of elected commissioners and reduced the governor's practical executive authority to commander of the militia and the executor of legislation. The matter was taken to the Indiana Supreme Court in the case of Tucker v. State. The court ruled for the first time that the governor was in fact the Chief Executive of the state, and that the legislature could pass no law that infringed upon that right. The decision was a major shift from previous court decisions and granted governors a legal basis to resist future encroachment on their powers.

During the 1970s, a series of amendments was passed under popular governors that also increased their powers. The state courts were again made appointive, but the selection of the candidates was granted to the court-dominated Indiana Judicial Nominating Commission. However, the governor was given more control over the process in which he previously had none. Another amendment removed the ban on consecutive terms, allowing Indiana's first consecutive term governors in over one hundred years. A third amendment granted the power to prepare a budget to a State Budgetary Agency, which was run by officials appointed by the governor. The significant authority this gave the governor over the budget was the "greatest transfer of power" to the governor yet, according to historian and professor of political science Linda Gugin.

Despite gaining considerable power during the mid-twentieth-century, Indiana's governor remains fairly weak compared to his counterparts in other states. He has no line-item veto authority, and the pocket veto was ruled unconstitutional. If a governor does not sign or reject a bill, it becomes law automatically. This led to a fistfight during the term of Claude Matthews, who was locked out of the House chambers to prevent him from returning a bill in time. The legislature can override a veto with a simple majority, as opposed to a supermajority that is required federally and in most other states. The legislature still exercises final control over the hiring of state employees, but given the large size of the government and the short legislative sessions, they are unable to make any considerable impact other than their continued advocacy for an expanded merit system. The cabinet is still almost entirely independent of the governor, and he has control over only half of the government's agencies, such as the Indiana State Police and the Indiana Bureau of Motor Vehicles. Other large agencies, such as the Department of Administration, are under the control of the cabinet.

=== Veto usage ===
During the state's early history, vetoes were seldom employed by governors primarily because they were seen as only symbolic since the General Assembly could override them with only a simple majority. Governor James Whitcomb was the first to make significant use of the power and vetoed a record of fifteen bills during a single legislative session. Roger Branigin, who presided over a hostile legislature, made the most total vetoes of any governor, returning a total of one hundred bills to the assembly. Despite the fact that vetoes are easily overridden, only around ten percent of vetoed bills are overridden. During the 1970s, for example, 117 bills were vetoed, but only eleven were overridden. Observers and historians attribute this to the short length of legislative sessions, which often do not allow enough time for a large number of bills to pass through both houses twice. Another factor is that legislators of the same party as the governor typically refuse to override his veto, even in cases where they supported the bill originally.

=== General Assembly relations ===
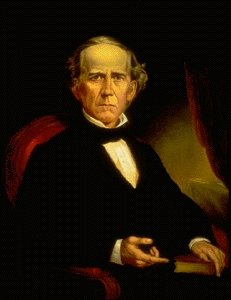
Governor Joseph A. Wright had a bitter fight with the General Assembly over the Bank of Indiana.

The governor's relationship with the General Assembly has typically been the determining factor in his success at enacting his agenda, although other factors also play an important role. In most of Indiana's history, the governor has come to power at a time in which his party controlled the assembly. Since the political parties first became dominant in 1831 and until 2010, thirty-three sessions of the legislature have been divided with different parties controlling the House and Senate. Only five sessions have occurred where the legislature was entirely controlled by the opposition party, while in ninety-eight sessions the governor's party controlled the entire assembly.

Governors who had previously been legislators have generally had greater success in achieving their legislative goals while governor. Three speakers of the house have become governor. Governor Joseph A. Wright had the worst relations of any governor with the assembly. He twice delivered speeches to a joint session where he harangued them for what he perceived to be corruption, accusing them of taking bribes from the Bank of Indiana. The legislature responded by overriding all his anti-banking vetoes. He was so disliked by his own party that he was expelled from it after his term.

=== Traits ===
Except for James Whitcomb, all of Indiana's governors have been married at the time of their election. Whitcomb married while in office. About half of the governors have been married multiple times, all due to the death of their first wives. Three governors' wives, including Whitcomb's, died while their husbands were in office. Except for Jonathan Jennings, Thomas R. Marshall and Eric Holcomb, all of the state governors have also had children. After leaving office, Marshall adopted a young boy. Only twenty of Indiana's governors were native to the state. Seven were born in Pennsylvania, four born in Ohio, and four born in Kentucky. Other governors have come from Michigan, Virginia, New York, and Vermont.

Territorial Governor William Henry Harrison was appointed to office at age twenty-seven, making him the youngest executive. James B. Ray, elevated at thirty-one and reelected at thirty-two, was the youngest governor to be elected to office. Evan Bayh, at age thirty-four, is the only other governor under the age of forty to be elected. James D. Williams, at age sixty-nine, was the oldest governor to be elected and died in office at age seventy-two. The average age of governors at the time of their election is fifty.

Thirty-two of Indiana's governors have served in the military. Veteran organizations have served as a gateway for the governorship. Ira J. Chase served as leader of the Grand Army of the Republic. Paul V. McNutt, Ralph F. Gates, and George N. Craig were leaders of the American Legion, whose national headquarters is in Indianapolis. Thirty governors have been lawyers by profession, and three have been farmers. Thirty received a college education, with eleven of them having attended Indiana University. Several governors have gone on to higher office, with nine serving in the United States Senate, and three serving as Vice President of the United States.

== Gubernatorial elections ==
Under the original constitution of 1816, the state held gubernatorial elections every three years. The first election was held before statehood was approved, in August 1816. Until the constitution was replaced in 1851, elections were held in October, and winners took office in December. In 1851, Indiana adopted its second and current constitution, which banned governors from serving consecutive terms and lengthened terms to four years. Elections since then have been held on Election Day in November during years divisible by four, concurrent with presidential elections. In 1972, the constitution was amended to allow governors to immediately succeed themselves. As mentioned above, the amendment limited a governor to a total of eight years in office during a 12-year period, effectively limiting them to two consecutive terms.

== Timeline ==
Timeline of Indiana governors
