= List of United States senators from Indiana =

Current delegation

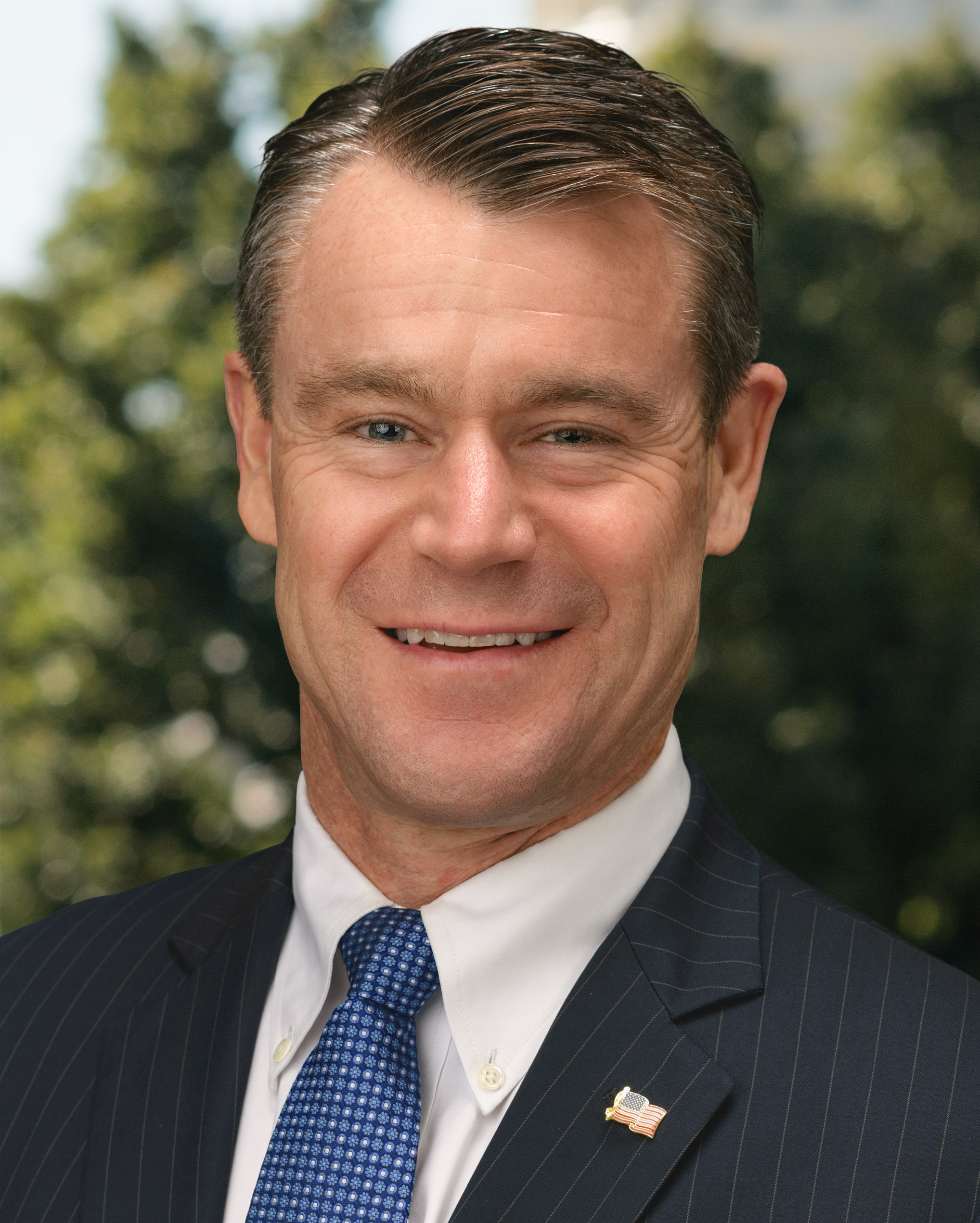
Todd Young (R)

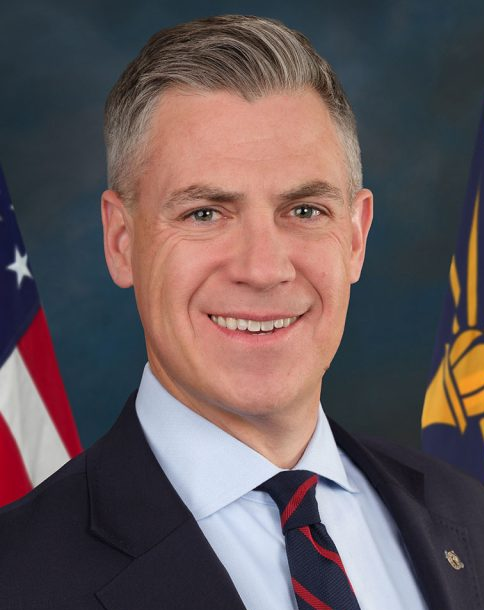
Jim Banks (R)

(ordered by seniority)

Indiana was admitted to the Union on December 11, 1816. Since then, the state has been represented in the United States Senate by 45 different men in class 1 and 3; David Turpie served non-consecutive terms in class 1, Dan Coats served non-consecutive terms in class 3, and William E. Jenner served in both classes. Until the passage of the Seventeenth Amendment to the United States Constitution in 1913, senators were elected by the Indiana General Assembly; after that, they were elected popularly by Indiana citizens. A senatorial term lasts six years, beginning on January 3. In case of a vacancy, the governor of Indiana has the duty to appoint a new U.S. senator. Indiana's current U.S. senators are Republicans Todd Young (serving since 2017) and Jim Banks (serving since 2025). Richard Lugar was the state's longest serving senator (1977–2013).

== List of senators ==
Class 1 Class 1 senators belong to the electoral cycle that most recently had regular elections in 2006, 2012, 2018, and 2024. The next election will be in 2030.						C	Class 3 Class 3 senators belong to the electoral cycle that most recently had regular elections in 2004, 2010, 2016, and 2022. The next election will be in 2028.					
#	Senator	Party	Dates in office	Electoral history	T	C	T	Electoral history	Dates in office	Party	Senator	#
1	James Noble (Brookville)	Democratic- Republican	Dec 11, 1816 – Feb 26, 1831	Elected in 1816.	1	14th	1	Elected in 1816.	Dec 11, 1816 – Mar 3, 1825	Democratic- Republican	Waller Taylor (Vincennes)	1
1	James Noble (Brookville)	Democratic- Republican	Dec 11, 1816 – Feb 26, 1831	Elected in 1816.	1	15th	1	Elected in 1816.	Dec 11, 1816 – Mar 3, 1825	Democratic- Republican	Waller Taylor (Vincennes)	1
1	James Noble (Brookville)	Democratic- Republican	Dec 11, 1816 – Feb 26, 1831	Elected in 1816.	1	16th	2	Re-elected in 1818. Retired.	Dec 11, 1816 – Mar 3, 1825	Democratic- Republican	Waller Taylor (Vincennes)	1
1	James Noble (Brookville)	Democratic- Republican	Dec 11, 1816 – Feb 26, 1831	Re-elected in 1821.	2	17th	2	Re-elected in 1818. Retired.	Dec 11, 1816 – Mar 3, 1825	Democratic- Republican	Waller Taylor (Vincennes)	1
1	James Noble (Brookville)	Democratic- Republican	Dec 11, 1816 – Feb 26, 1831	Re-elected in 1821.	2	18th	2	Re-elected in 1818. Retired.	Dec 11, 1816 – Mar 3, 1825	Democratic- Republican	Waller Taylor (Vincennes)	1
1	James Noble (Brookville)	National; Republican	Dec 11, 1816 – Feb 26, 1831	Re-elected in 1821.	2	19th	3	Elected in 1824.	Mar 4, 1825 – Mar 3, 1837	National; Republican	William Hendricks (Madison)	2
1	James Noble (Brookville)	National; Republican	Dec 11, 1816 – Feb 26, 1831	Re-elected in 1827. Died.	3	20th	3	Elected in 1824.	Mar 4, 1825 – Mar 3, 1837	National; Republican	William Hendricks (Madison)	2
1	James Noble (Brookville)	National; Republican	Dec 11, 1816 – Feb 26, 1831	Re-elected in 1827. Died.	3	21st	3	Elected in 1824.	Mar 4, 1825 – Mar 3, 1837	National; Republican	William Hendricks (Madison)	2
Vacant			Feb 26, 1831 – Aug 19, 1831		3	21st	3	Elected in 1824.	Mar 4, 1825 – Mar 3, 1837	National; Republican	William Hendricks (Madison)	2
Vacant			Feb 26, 1831 – Aug 19, 1831		3	22nd	4	Re-elected in 1830. Lost re-election.	Mar 4, 1825 – Mar 3, 1837	National; Republican	William Hendricks (Madison)	2
2	Robert Hanna (Brookville)	National; Republican	Aug 19, 1831 – Jan 3, 1832	Appointed to continue Noble's term. Retired when successor qualified.		22nd	4	Re-elected in 1830. Lost re-election.	Mar 4, 1825 – Mar 3, 1837	National; Republican	William Hendricks (Madison)	2
3	John Tipton (Logansport)	Jacksonian	Jan 3, 1832 – Mar 3, 1839	Elected to finish Noble's term.		22nd	4	Re-elected in 1830. Lost re-election.	Mar 4, 1825 – Mar 3, 1837	National; Republican	William Hendricks (Madison)	2
3	John Tipton (Logansport)	Jacksonian	Jan 3, 1832 – Mar 3, 1839	Re-elected in 1832. Retired.	4	23rd	4	Re-elected in 1830. Lost re-election.	Mar 4, 1825 – Mar 3, 1837	National; Republican	William Hendricks (Madison)	2
3	John Tipton (Logansport)	Jacksonian	Jan 3, 1832 – Mar 3, 1839	Re-elected in 1832. Retired.	4	24th	4	Re-elected in 1830. Lost re-election.	Mar 4, 1825 – Mar 3, 1837	National; Republican	William Hendricks (Madison)	2
3	John Tipton (Logansport)	Democratic	Jan 3, 1832 – Mar 3, 1839	Re-elected in 1832. Retired.	4	25th	5	Elected in 1836. Lost re-election.	Mar 4, 1837 – Mar 3, 1843	Whig	Oliver H. Smith (Indianapolis)	3
4	Albert Smith White (Lafayette)	Whig	Mar 4, 1839 – Mar 3, 1845	Elected in 1838. Retired.	5	26th	5	Elected in 1836. Lost re-election.	Mar 4, 1837 – Mar 3, 1843	Whig	Oliver H. Smith (Indianapolis)	3
4	Albert Smith White (Lafayette)	Whig	Mar 4, 1839 – Mar 3, 1845	Elected in 1838. Retired.	5	27th	5	Elected in 1836. Lost re-election.	Mar 4, 1837 – Mar 3, 1843	Whig	Oliver H. Smith (Indianapolis)	3
4	Albert Smith White (Lafayette)	Whig	Mar 4, 1839 – Mar 3, 1845	Elected in 1838. Retired.	5	28th	6	Elected in 1842. Lost renomination.	Mar 4, 1843 – Mar 3, 1849	Democratic	Ned Hannegan (Covington)	4
5	Jesse D. Bright (Jeffersonville)	Democratic	Mar 4, 1845 – Feb 5, 1862	Elected in 1844.	6	29th	6	Elected in 1842. Lost renomination.	Mar 4, 1843 – Mar 3, 1849	Democratic	Ned Hannegan (Covington)	4
5	Jesse D. Bright (Jeffersonville)	Democratic	Mar 4, 1845 – Feb 5, 1862	Elected in 1844.	6	30th	6	Elected in 1842. Lost renomination.	Mar 4, 1843 – Mar 3, 1849	Democratic	Ned Hannegan (Covington)	4
5	Jesse D. Bright (Jeffersonville)	Democratic	Mar 4, 1845 – Feb 5, 1862	Elected in 1844.	6	31st	7	Elected in 1848. Died.	Mar 4, 1849 – Oct 4, 1852	Democratic	James Whitcomb (Indianapolis)	5
5	Jesse D. Bright (Jeffersonville)	Democratic	Mar 4, 1845 – Feb 5, 1862	Re-elected in 1850.	7	32nd	7	Elected in 1848. Died.	Mar 4, 1849 – Oct 4, 1852	Democratic	James Whitcomb (Indianapolis)	5
5	Jesse D. Bright (Jeffersonville)	Democratic	Mar 4, 1845 – Feb 5, 1862	Re-elected in 1850.	7	32nd	7		Oct 4, 1852 – Dec 6, 1852	Vacant		
5	Jesse D. Bright (Jeffersonville)	Democratic	Mar 4, 1845 – Feb 5, 1862	Re-elected in 1850.	7	32nd	7	Appointed to continue Whitcomb's term. Retired when successor qualified.	Dec 6, 1852 – Jan 18, 1853	Democratic	Charles W. Cathcart (La Porte)	6
5	Jesse D. Bright (Jeffersonville)	Democratic	Mar 4, 1845 – Feb 5, 1862	Re-elected in 1850.	7	32nd	7	Elected to finish Whitcomb's term. Lost re-election.	Jan 18, 1853 – Mar 3, 1855	Democratic	John Pettit (Lafayette)	7
5	Jesse D. Bright (Jeffersonville)	Democratic	Mar 4, 1845 – Feb 5, 1862	Re-elected in 1850.	7	33rd	7	Elected to finish Whitcomb's term. Lost re-election.	Jan 18, 1853 – Mar 3, 1855	Democratic	John Pettit (Lafayette)	7
5	Jesse D. Bright (Jeffersonville)	Democratic	Mar 4, 1845 – Feb 5, 1862	Re-elected in 1850.	7	34th	8	Legislature failed to elect.	Mar 4, 1855 – Feb 4, 1857	Vacant		
5	Jesse D. Bright (Jeffersonville)	Democratic	Mar 4, 1845 – Feb 5, 1862	Re-elected in 1850.	7	34th	8	Elected late in 1857. Retired.	Feb 4, 1857 – Mar 3, 1861	Democratic	Graham N. Fitch (Logansport)	8
5	Jesse D. Bright (Jeffersonville)	Democratic	Mar 4, 1845 – Feb 5, 1862	Re-elected in 1856. Expelled for sympathizing with the Confederacy.	8	35th	8	Elected late in 1857. Retired.	Feb 4, 1857 – Mar 3, 1861	Democratic	Graham N. Fitch (Logansport)	8
5	Jesse D. Bright (Jeffersonville)	Democratic	Mar 4, 1845 – Feb 5, 1862	Re-elected in 1856. Expelled for sympathizing with the Confederacy.	8	36th	8	Elected late in 1857. Retired.	Feb 4, 1857 – Mar 3, 1861	Democratic	Graham N. Fitch (Logansport)	8
5	Jesse D. Bright (Jeffersonville)	Democratic	Mar 4, 1845 – Feb 5, 1862	Re-elected in 1856. Expelled for sympathizing with the Confederacy.	8	37th	9	Elected in 1860. Unknown if retired or lost re-election.	Mar 4, 1861 – Mar 3, 1867	Republican	Henry S. Lane (Crawfordsville)	9
Vacant			Feb 5, 1862 – Feb 24, 1862		8	37th	9	Elected in 1860. Unknown if retired or lost re-election.	Mar 4, 1861 – Mar 3, 1867	Republican	Henry S. Lane (Crawfordsville)	9
6	Joseph A. Wright (Indianapolis)	Union	Feb 24, 1862 – Jan 14, 1863	Appointed to finish Bright's term. Retired when successor qualified.	8	37th	9	Elected in 1860. Unknown if retired or lost re-election.	Mar 4, 1861 – Mar 3, 1867	Republican	Henry S. Lane (Crawfordsville)	9
7	David Turpie (Indianapolis)	Democratic	Jan 14, 1863 – Mar 3, 1863	Elected to finish Bright's term. Retired.	8	37th	9	Elected in 1860. Unknown if retired or lost re-election.	Mar 4, 1861 – Mar 3, 1867	Republican	Henry S. Lane (Crawfordsville)	9
8	Thomas A. Hendricks (Indianapolis)	Democratic	Mar 4, 1863 – Mar 3, 1869	Elected in 1862. Retired.	9	38th	9	Elected in 1860. Unknown if retired or lost re-election.	Mar 4, 1861 – Mar 3, 1867	Republican	Henry S. Lane (Crawfordsville)	9
8	Thomas A. Hendricks (Indianapolis)	Democratic	Mar 4, 1863 – Mar 3, 1869	Elected in 1862. Retired.	9	39th	9	Elected in 1860. Unknown if retired or lost re-election.	Mar 4, 1861 – Mar 3, 1867	Republican	Henry S. Lane (Crawfordsville)	9
8	Thomas A. Hendricks (Indianapolis)	Democratic	Mar 4, 1863 – Mar 3, 1869	Elected in 1862. Retired.	9	40th	10	Elected in 1867.	Mar 4, 1867 – Nov 1, 1877	Republican	Oliver P. Morton (Indianapolis)	10
9	Daniel D. Pratt (Logansport)	Republican	Mar 4, 1869 – Mar 3, 1875	Elected in 1868. Retired.	10	41st	10	Elected in 1867.	Mar 4, 1867 – Nov 1, 1877	Republican	Oliver P. Morton (Indianapolis)	10
9	Daniel D. Pratt (Logansport)	Republican	Mar 4, 1869 – Mar 3, 1875	Elected in 1868. Retired.	10	42nd	10	Elected in 1867.	Mar 4, 1867 – Nov 1, 1877	Republican	Oliver P. Morton (Indianapolis)	10
9	Daniel D. Pratt (Logansport)	Republican	Mar 4, 1869 – Mar 3, 1875	Elected in 1868. Retired.	10	43rd	11	Re-elected in 1873. Died.	Mar 4, 1867 – Nov 1, 1877	Republican	Oliver P. Morton (Indianapolis)	10
10	Joseph E. McDonald (Indianapolis)	Democratic	Mar 4, 1875 – Mar 3, 1881	Elected in 1874 or 1875 Lost re-election.	11	44th	11	Re-elected in 1873. Died.	Mar 4, 1867 – Nov 1, 1877	Republican	Oliver P. Morton (Indianapolis)	10
10	Joseph E. McDonald (Indianapolis)	Democratic	Mar 4, 1875 – Mar 3, 1881	Elected in 1874 or 1875 Lost re-election.	11	45th	11	Re-elected in 1873. Died.	Mar 4, 1867 – Nov 1, 1877	Republican	Oliver P. Morton (Indianapolis)	10
10	Joseph E. McDonald (Indianapolis)	Democratic	Mar 4, 1875 – Mar 3, 1881	Elected in 1874 or 1875 Lost re-election.	11	45th	11		Nov 1, 1877 – Nov 6, 1877	Vacant		
10	Joseph E. McDonald (Indianapolis)	Democratic	Mar 4, 1875 – Mar 3, 1881	Elected in 1874 or 1875 Lost re-election.	11	45th	11	Appointed to continue Morton's term. Elected in 1879 to finish Morton's term.	Nov 6, 1877 – Mar 3, 1897	Democratic	Daniel W. Voorhees (Terre Haute)	11
10	Joseph E. McDonald (Indianapolis)	Democratic	Mar 4, 1875 – Mar 3, 1881	Elected in 1874 or 1875 Lost re-election.	11	46th	12	Re-elected in 1879.	Nov 6, 1877 – Mar 3, 1897	Democratic	Daniel W. Voorhees (Terre Haute)	11
11	Benjamin Harrison (Indianapolis)	Republican	Mar 4, 1881 – Mar 3, 1887	Elected in 1881. Lost re-election.	12	47th	12	Re-elected in 1879.	Nov 6, 1877 – Mar 3, 1897	Democratic	Daniel W. Voorhees (Terre Haute)	11
11	Benjamin Harrison (Indianapolis)	Republican	Mar 4, 1881 – Mar 3, 1887	Elected in 1881. Lost re-election.	12	48th	12	Re-elected in 1879.	Nov 6, 1877 – Mar 3, 1897	Democratic	Daniel W. Voorhees (Terre Haute)	11
11	Benjamin Harrison (Indianapolis)	Republican	Mar 4, 1881 – Mar 3, 1887	Elected in 1881. Lost re-election.	12	49th	13	Re-elected in 1885.	Nov 6, 1877 – Mar 3, 1897	Democratic	Daniel W. Voorhees (Terre Haute)	11
12	David Turpie (Indianapolis)	Democratic	Mar 4, 1887 – Mar 3, 1899	Elected in 1887.	13	50th	13	Re-elected in 1885.	Nov 6, 1877 – Mar 3, 1897	Democratic	Daniel W. Voorhees (Terre Haute)	11
12	David Turpie (Indianapolis)	Democratic	Mar 4, 1887 – Mar 3, 1899	Elected in 1887.	13	51st	13	Re-elected in 1885.	Nov 6, 1877 – Mar 3, 1897	Democratic	Daniel W. Voorhees (Terre Haute)	11
12	David Turpie (Indianapolis)	Democratic	Mar 4, 1887 – Mar 3, 1899	Elected in 1887.	13	52nd	14	Re-elected in 1891. Lost re-election.	Nov 6, 1877 – Mar 3, 1897	Democratic	Daniel W. Voorhees (Terre Haute)	11
12	David Turpie (Indianapolis)	Democratic	Mar 4, 1887 – Mar 3, 1899	Re-elected in 1893. Lost re-election.	14	53rd	14	Re-elected in 1891. Lost re-election.	Nov 6, 1877 – Mar 3, 1897	Democratic	Daniel W. Voorhees (Terre Haute)	11
12	David Turpie (Indianapolis)	Democratic	Mar 4, 1887 – Mar 3, 1899	Re-elected in 1893. Lost re-election.	14	54th	14	Re-elected in 1891. Lost re-election.	Nov 6, 1877 – Mar 3, 1897	Democratic	Daniel W. Voorhees (Terre Haute)	11
12	David Turpie (Indianapolis)	Democratic	Mar 4, 1887 – Mar 3, 1899	Re-elected in 1893. Lost re-election.	14	55th	15	Elected in 1897.	Mar 4, 1897 – Mar 3, 1905	Republican	Charles W. Fairbanks (Indianapolis)	12
13	Albert J. Beveridge (Indianapolis)	Republican	Mar 4, 1899 – Mar 3, 1911	Elected in 1899.	15	56th	15	Elected in 1897.	Mar 4, 1897 – Mar 3, 1905	Republican	Charles W. Fairbanks (Indianapolis)	12
13	Albert J. Beveridge (Indianapolis)	Republican	Mar 4, 1899 – Mar 3, 1911	Elected in 1899.	15	57th	15	Elected in 1897.	Mar 4, 1897 – Mar 3, 1905	Republican	Charles W. Fairbanks (Indianapolis)	12
13	Albert J. Beveridge (Indianapolis)	Republican	Mar 4, 1899 – Mar 3, 1911	Elected in 1899.	15	58th	16	Re-elected in 1903. Resigned to become U.S. Vice President.	Mar 4, 1897 – Mar 3, 1905	Republican	Charles W. Fairbanks (Indianapolis)	12
13	Albert J. Beveridge (Indianapolis)	Republican	Mar 4, 1899 – Mar 3, 1911	Re-elected in 1905. Lost re-election.	16	59th	16	Elected to finish Fairbanks's term. Lost re-election.	Mar 4, 1905 – Mar 3, 1909	Republican	James A. Hemenway (Boonville)	13
13	Albert J. Beveridge (Indianapolis)	Republican	Mar 4, 1899 – Mar 3, 1911	Re-elected in 1905. Lost re-election.	16	60th	16	Elected to finish Fairbanks's term. Lost re-election.	Mar 4, 1905 – Mar 3, 1909	Republican	James A. Hemenway (Boonville)	13
13	Albert J. Beveridge (Indianapolis)	Republican	Mar 4, 1899 – Mar 3, 1911	Re-elected in 1905. Lost re-election.	16	61st	17	Elected in 1909.	Mar 4, 1909 – Mar 14, 1916	Democratic	Benjamin F. Shively (South Bend)	14
14	John W. Kern (Indianapolis)	Democratic	Mar 4, 1911 – Mar 3, 1917	Elected in 1911. Lost re-election.	17	62nd	17	Elected in 1909.	Mar 4, 1909 – Mar 14, 1916	Democratic	Benjamin F. Shively (South Bend)	14
14	John W. Kern (Indianapolis)	Democratic	Mar 4, 1911 – Mar 3, 1917	Elected in 1911. Lost re-election.	17	63rd	17	Elected in 1909.	Mar 4, 1909 – Mar 14, 1916	Democratic	Benjamin F. Shively (South Bend)	14
14	John W. Kern (Indianapolis)	Democratic	Mar 4, 1911 – Mar 3, 1917	Elected in 1911. Lost re-election.	17	64th	18	Re-elected in 1914. Died.	Mar 4, 1909 – Mar 14, 1916	Democratic	Benjamin F. Shively (South Bend)	14
14	John W. Kern (Indianapolis)	Democratic	Mar 4, 1911 – Mar 3, 1917	Elected in 1911. Lost re-election.	17	64th	18		Mar 14, 1916 – Mar 20, 1916	Vacant		
14	John W. Kern (Indianapolis)	Democratic	Mar 4, 1911 – Mar 3, 1917	Elected in 1911. Lost re-election.	17	64th	18	Appointed to continue Shiveley's term. Lost election to finish Shiveley's term.	Mar 20, 1916 – Nov 7, 1916	Democratic	Thomas Taggart (French Lick)	15
14	John W. Kern (Indianapolis)	Democratic	Mar 4, 1911 – Mar 3, 1917	Elected in 1911. Lost re-election.	17	64th	18	Elected to finish Shiveley's term.	Nov 8, 1916 – Mar 3, 1933	Republican	James E. Watson (Rushville)	16
15	Harry S. New (Indianapolis)	Republican	Mar 4, 1917 – Mar 3, 1923	Elected in 1916. Lost renomination.	18	65th	18	Elected to finish Shiveley's term.	Nov 8, 1916 – Mar 3, 1933	Republican	James E. Watson (Rushville)	16
15	Harry S. New (Indianapolis)	Republican	Mar 4, 1917 – Mar 3, 1923	Elected in 1916. Lost renomination.	18	66th	18	Elected to finish Shiveley's term.	Nov 8, 1916 – Mar 3, 1933	Republican	James E. Watson (Rushville)	16
15	Harry S. New (Indianapolis)	Republican	Mar 4, 1917 – Mar 3, 1923	Elected in 1916. Lost renomination.	18	67th	19	Re-elected in 1920.	Nov 8, 1916 – Mar 3, 1933	Republican	James E. Watson (Rushville)	16
16	Samuel M. Ralston (Indianapolis)	Democratic	Mar 4, 1923 – Oct 14, 1925	Elected in 1922. Died.	19	68th	19	Re-elected in 1920.	Nov 8, 1916 – Mar 3, 1933	Republican	James E. Watson (Rushville)	16
16	Samuel M. Ralston (Indianapolis)	Democratic	Mar 4, 1923 – Oct 14, 1925	Elected in 1922. Died.	19	69th	19	Re-elected in 1920.	Nov 8, 1916 – Mar 3, 1933	Republican	James E. Watson (Rushville)	16
Vacant			Oct 14, 1925 – Oct 20, 1925		19	69th	19	Re-elected in 1920.	Nov 8, 1916 – Mar 3, 1933	Republican	James E. Watson (Rushville)	16
17	Arthur Raymond Robinson (Indianapolis)	Republican	Oct 20, 1925 – Jan 3, 1935	Appointed to continue Ralston's term. Elected in 1926 to finish Ralston's term.	19	69th	19	Re-elected in 1920.	Nov 8, 1916 – Mar 3, 1933	Republican	James E. Watson (Rushville)	16
17	Arthur Raymond Robinson (Indianapolis)	Republican	Oct 20, 1925 – Jan 3, 1935	Appointed to continue Ralston's term. Elected in 1926 to finish Ralston's term.	19	70th	20	Re-elected in 1926. Lost re-election.	Nov 8, 1916 – Mar 3, 1933	Republican	James E. Watson (Rushville)	16
17	Arthur Raymond Robinson (Indianapolis)	Republican	Oct 20, 1925 – Jan 3, 1935	Re-elected in 1928. Lost re-election.	20	71st	20	Re-elected in 1926. Lost re-election.	Nov 8, 1916 – Mar 3, 1933	Republican	James E. Watson (Rushville)	16
17	Arthur Raymond Robinson (Indianapolis)	Republican	Oct 20, 1925 – Jan 3, 1935	Re-elected in 1928. Lost re-election.	20	72nd	20	Re-elected in 1926. Lost re-election.	Nov 8, 1916 – Mar 3, 1933	Republican	James E. Watson (Rushville)	16
17	Arthur Raymond Robinson (Indianapolis)	Republican	Oct 20, 1925 – Jan 3, 1935	Re-elected in 1928. Lost re-election.	20	73rd	21	Elected in 1932.	Mar 4, 1933 – Jan 25, 1944	Democratic	Frederick Van Nuys (Indianapolis)	17
18	Sherman Minton (New Albany)	Democratic	Jan 3, 1935 – Jan 3, 1941	Elected in 1934. Lost re-election.	21	74th	21	Elected in 1932.	Mar 4, 1933 – Jan 25, 1944	Democratic	Frederick Van Nuys (Indianapolis)	17
18	Sherman Minton (New Albany)	Democratic	Jan 3, 1935 – Jan 3, 1941	Elected in 1934. Lost re-election.	21	75th	21	Elected in 1932.	Mar 4, 1933 – Jan 25, 1944	Democratic	Frederick Van Nuys (Indianapolis)	17
18	Sherman Minton (New Albany)	Democratic	Jan 3, 1935 – Jan 3, 1941	Elected in 1934. Lost re-election.	21	76th	22	Re-elected in 1938. Died.	Mar 4, 1933 – Jan 25, 1944	Democratic	Frederick Van Nuys (Indianapolis)	17
19	Raymond E. Willis (Angola)	Republican	Jan 3, 1941 – Jan 3, 1947	Elected in 1940. Retired.	22	77th	22	Re-elected in 1938. Died.	Mar 4, 1933 – Jan 25, 1944	Democratic	Frederick Van Nuys (Indianapolis)	17
19	Raymond E. Willis (Angola)	Republican	Jan 3, 1941 – Jan 3, 1947	Elected in 1940. Retired.	22	78th	22	Re-elected in 1938. Died.	Mar 4, 1933 – Jan 25, 1944	Democratic	Frederick Van Nuys (Indianapolis)	17
19	Raymond E. Willis (Angola)	Republican	Jan 3, 1941 – Jan 3, 1947	Elected in 1940. Retired.	22	78th	22		Jan 25, 1944 – Jan 28, 1944	Vacant		
19	Raymond E. Willis (Angola)	Republican	Jan 3, 1941 – Jan 3, 1947	Elected in 1940. Retired.	22	78th	22	Appointed to continue Van Nuys's term. Retired when successor elected.	Jan 28, 1944 – Nov 13, 1944	Democratic	Samuel D. Jackson (Fort Wayne)	18
19	Raymond E. Willis (Angola)	Republican	Jan 3, 1941 – Jan 3, 1947	Elected in 1940. Retired.	22	78th	22	Elected to finish Van Nuys's term. Retired.	Nov 14, 1944 – Jan 3, 1945	Republican	William E. Jenner (Bedford)	19
19	Raymond E. Willis (Angola)	Republican	Jan 3, 1941 – Jan 3, 1947	Elected in 1940. Retired.	22	79th	23	Elected in 1944.	Jan 3, 1945 – Jan 3, 1963	Republican	Homer E. Capehart (Washington)	20
20	William E. Jenner (Bedford)	Republican	Jan 3, 1947 – Jan 3, 1959	Elected in 1946.	23	80th	23	Elected in 1944.	Jan 3, 1945 – Jan 3, 1963	Republican	Homer E. Capehart (Washington)	20
20	William E. Jenner (Bedford)	Republican	Jan 3, 1947 – Jan 3, 1959	Elected in 1946.	23	81st	23	Elected in 1944.	Jan 3, 1945 – Jan 3, 1963	Republican	Homer E. Capehart (Washington)	20
20	William E. Jenner (Bedford)	Republican	Jan 3, 1947 – Jan 3, 1959	Elected in 1946.	23	82nd	24	Re-elected in 1950.	Jan 3, 1945 – Jan 3, 1963	Republican	Homer E. Capehart (Washington)	20
20	William E. Jenner (Bedford)	Republican	Jan 3, 1947 – Jan 3, 1959	Re-elected in 1952. Retired.	24	83rd	24	Re-elected in 1950.	Jan 3, 1945 – Jan 3, 1963	Republican	Homer E. Capehart (Washington)	20
20	William E. Jenner (Bedford)	Republican	Jan 3, 1947 – Jan 3, 1959	Re-elected in 1952. Retired.	24	84th	24	Re-elected in 1950.	Jan 3, 1945 – Jan 3, 1963	Republican	Homer E. Capehart (Washington)	20
20	William E. Jenner (Bedford)	Republican	Jan 3, 1947 – Jan 3, 1959	Re-elected in 1952. Retired.	24	85th	25	Re-elected in 1956. Lost re-election.	Jan 3, 1945 – Jan 3, 1963	Republican	Homer E. Capehart (Washington)	20
21	Vance Hartke (Evansville)	Democratic	Jan 3, 1959 – Jan 3, 1977	Elected in 1958.	25	86th	25	Re-elected in 1956. Lost re-election.	Jan 3, 1945 – Jan 3, 1963	Republican	Homer E. Capehart (Washington)	20
21	Vance Hartke (Evansville)	Democratic	Jan 3, 1959 – Jan 3, 1977	Elected in 1958.	25	87th	25	Re-elected in 1956. Lost re-election.	Jan 3, 1945 – Jan 3, 1963	Republican	Homer E. Capehart (Washington)	20
21	Vance Hartke (Evansville)	Democratic	Jan 3, 1959 – Jan 3, 1977	Elected in 1958.	25	88th	26	Elected in 1962.	Jan 3, 1963 – Jan 3, 1981	Democratic	Birch Bayh (Terre Haute)	21
21	Vance Hartke (Evansville)	Democratic	Jan 3, 1959 – Jan 3, 1977	Re-elected in 1964.	26	89th	26	Elected in 1962.	Jan 3, 1963 – Jan 3, 1981	Democratic	Birch Bayh (Terre Haute)	21
21	Vance Hartke (Evansville)	Democratic	Jan 3, 1959 – Jan 3, 1977	Re-elected in 1964.	26	90th	26	Elected in 1962.	Jan 3, 1963 – Jan 3, 1981	Democratic	Birch Bayh (Terre Haute)	21
21	Vance Hartke (Evansville)	Democratic	Jan 3, 1959 – Jan 3, 1977	Re-elected in 1964.	26	91st	27	Re-elected in 1968.	Jan 3, 1963 – Jan 3, 1981	Democratic	Birch Bayh (Terre Haute)	21
21	Vance Hartke (Evansville)	Democratic	Jan 3, 1959 – Jan 3, 1977	Re-elected in 1970. Lost re-election.	27	92nd	27	Re-elected in 1968.	Jan 3, 1963 – Jan 3, 1981	Democratic	Birch Bayh (Terre Haute)	21
21	Vance Hartke (Evansville)	Democratic	Jan 3, 1959 – Jan 3, 1977	Re-elected in 1970. Lost re-election.	27	93rd	27	Re-elected in 1968.	Jan 3, 1963 – Jan 3, 1981	Democratic	Birch Bayh (Terre Haute)	21
21	Vance Hartke (Evansville)	Democratic	Jan 3, 1959 – Jan 3, 1977	Re-elected in 1970. Lost re-election.	27	94th	28	Re-elected in 1974. Lost re-election.	Jan 3, 1963 – Jan 3, 1981	Democratic	Birch Bayh (Terre Haute)	21
22	Richard Lugar (Indianapolis)	Republican	Jan 3, 1977 – Jan 3, 2013	Elected in 1976.	28	95th	28	Re-elected in 1974. Lost re-election.	Jan 3, 1963 – Jan 3, 1981	Democratic	Birch Bayh (Terre Haute)	21
22	Richard Lugar (Indianapolis)	Republican	Jan 3, 1977 – Jan 3, 2013	Elected in 1976.	28	96th	28	Re-elected in 1974. Lost re-election.	Jan 3, 1963 – Jan 3, 1981	Democratic	Birch Bayh (Terre Haute)	21
22	Richard Lugar (Indianapolis)	Republican	Jan 3, 1977 – Jan 3, 2013	Elected in 1976.	28	97th	29	Elected in 1980.	Jan 3, 1981 – Jan 3, 1989	Republican	Dan Quayle (Huntington)	22
22	Richard Lugar (Indianapolis)	Republican	Jan 3, 1977 – Jan 3, 2013	Re-elected in 1982.	29	98th	29	Elected in 1980.	Jan 3, 1981 – Jan 3, 1989	Republican	Dan Quayle (Huntington)	22
22	Richard Lugar (Indianapolis)	Republican	Jan 3, 1977 – Jan 3, 2013	Re-elected in 1982.	29	99th	29	Elected in 1980.	Jan 3, 1981 – Jan 3, 1989	Republican	Dan Quayle (Huntington)	22
22	Richard Lugar (Indianapolis)	Republican	Jan 3, 1977 – Jan 3, 2013	Re-elected in 1982.	29	100th	30	Re-elected in 1986. Resigned to become U.S. Vice President.	Jan 3, 1981 – Jan 3, 1989	Republican	Dan Quayle (Huntington)	22
22	Richard Lugar (Indianapolis)	Republican	Jan 3, 1977 – Jan 3, 2013	Re-elected in 1988.	30	101st	30	Appointed to continue Quayle's term. Elected in 1990 to finish Quayle's term.	Jan 3, 1989 – Jan 3, 1999	Republican	Dan Coats (Fort Wayne)	23
22	Richard Lugar (Indianapolis)	Republican	Jan 3, 1977 – Jan 3, 2013	Re-elected in 1988.	30	102nd	30	Appointed to continue Quayle's term. Elected in 1990 to finish Quayle's term.	Jan 3, 1989 – Jan 3, 1999	Republican	Dan Coats (Fort Wayne)	23
22	Richard Lugar (Indianapolis)	Republican	Jan 3, 1977 – Jan 3, 2013	Re-elected in 1988.	30	103rd	31	Re-elected in 1992. Retired.	Jan 3, 1989 – Jan 3, 1999	Republican	Dan Coats (Fort Wayne)	23
22	Richard Lugar (Indianapolis)	Republican	Jan 3, 1977 – Jan 3, 2013	Re-elected in 1994.	31	104th	31	Re-elected in 1992. Retired.	Jan 3, 1989 – Jan 3, 1999	Republican	Dan Coats (Fort Wayne)	23
22	Richard Lugar (Indianapolis)	Republican	Jan 3, 1977 – Jan 3, 2013	Re-elected in 1994.	31	105th	31	Re-elected in 1992. Retired.	Jan 3, 1989 – Jan 3, 1999	Republican	Dan Coats (Fort Wayne)	23
22	Richard Lugar (Indianapolis)	Republican	Jan 3, 1977 – Jan 3, 2013	Re-elected in 1994.	31	106th	32	Elected in 1998.	Jan 3, 1999 – Jan 3, 2011	Democratic	Evan Bayh (Indianapolis)	24
22	Richard Lugar (Indianapolis)	Republican	Jan 3, 1977 – Jan 3, 2013	Re-elected in 2000.	32	107th	32	Elected in 1998.	Jan 3, 1999 – Jan 3, 2011	Democratic	Evan Bayh (Indianapolis)	24
22	Richard Lugar (Indianapolis)	Republican	Jan 3, 1977 – Jan 3, 2013	Re-elected in 2000.	32	108th	32	Elected in 1998.	Jan 3, 1999 – Jan 3, 2011	Democratic	Evan Bayh (Indianapolis)	24
22	Richard Lugar (Indianapolis)	Republican	Jan 3, 1977 – Jan 3, 2013	Re-elected in 2000.	32	109th	33	Re-elected in 2004. Retired.	Jan 3, 1999 – Jan 3, 2011	Democratic	Evan Bayh (Indianapolis)	24
22	Richard Lugar (Indianapolis)	Republican	Jan 3, 1977 – Jan 3, 2013	Re-elected in 2006. Lost renomination.	33	110th	33	Re-elected in 2004. Retired.	Jan 3, 1999 – Jan 3, 2011	Democratic	Evan Bayh (Indianapolis)	24
22	Richard Lugar (Indianapolis)	Republican	Jan 3, 1977 – Jan 3, 2013	Re-elected in 2006. Lost renomination.	33	111th	33	Re-elected in 2004. Retired.	Jan 3, 1999 – Jan 3, 2011	Democratic	Evan Bayh (Indianapolis)	24
22	Richard Lugar (Indianapolis)	Republican	Jan 3, 1977 – Jan 3, 2013	Re-elected in 2006. Lost renomination.	33	112th	34	Elected again in 2010. Retired.	Jan 3, 2011 – Jan 3, 2017	Republican	Dan Coats (Indianapolis)	25
23	Joe Donnelly (Granger)	Democratic	Jan 3, 2013 – Jan 3, 2019	Elected in 2012. Lost re-election.	34	113th	34	Elected again in 2010. Retired.	Jan 3, 2011 – Jan 3, 2017	Republican	Dan Coats (Indianapolis)	25
23	Joe Donnelly (Granger)	Democratic	Jan 3, 2013 – Jan 3, 2019	Elected in 2012. Lost re-election.	34	114th	34	Elected again in 2010. Retired.	Jan 3, 2011 – Jan 3, 2017	Republican	Dan Coats (Indianapolis)	25
23	Joe Donnelly (Granger)	Democratic	Jan 3, 2013 – Jan 3, 2019	Elected in 2012. Lost re-election.	34	115th	35	Elected in 2016.	Jan 3, 2017 – present	Republican	Todd Young (Bargersville)	26
24	Mike Braun (Jasper)	Republican	Jan 3, 2019 – Jan 3, 2025	Elected in 2018. Retired to run for Governor of Indiana.	35	116th	35	Elected in 2016.	Jan 3, 2017 – present	Republican	Todd Young (Bargersville)	26
24	Mike Braun (Jasper)	Republican	Jan 3, 2019 – Jan 3, 2025	Elected in 2018. Retired to run for Governor of Indiana.	35	117th	35	Elected in 2016.	Jan 3, 2017 – present	Republican	Todd Young (Bargersville)	26
24	Mike Braun (Jasper)	Republican	Jan 3, 2019 – Jan 3, 2025	Elected in 2018. Retired to run for Governor of Indiana.	35	118th	36	Re-elected in 2022.	Jan 3, 2017 – present	Republican	Todd Young (Bargersville)	26
25	Jim Banks (Columbia City)	Republican	Jan 3, 2025 – present	Elected in 2024.	36	119th	36	Re-elected in 2022.	Jan 3, 2017 – present	Republican	Todd Young (Bargersville)	26
25	Jim Banks (Columbia City)	Republican	Jan 3, 2025 – present	Elected in 2024.	36	120th	36	Re-elected in 2022.	Jan 3, 2017 – present	Republican	Todd Young (Bargersville)	26
25	Jim Banks (Columbia City)	Republican	Jan 3, 2025 – present	Elected in 2024.	36	121st	37	To be determined in the 2028 election.				
To be determined in the 2030 election.					37	122nd	37	To be determined in the 2028 election.				

== See also ==
- Elections in Indiana
- Indiana's congressional delegations
- List of United States representatives from Indiana

== References and external links ==
- "U.S. senators from Indiana". United States Senate.
- Byrd, Robert C. (October 1, 1993). Wolff, Wendy (ed.). The Senate, 1789-1989: Historical Statistics, 1789-1992. United States Senate Historical Office (volume 4 Bicentennial ed.). Washington, DC: U.S. Government Printing Office.
