= Vance Hartke =

American politician (1919–2003)

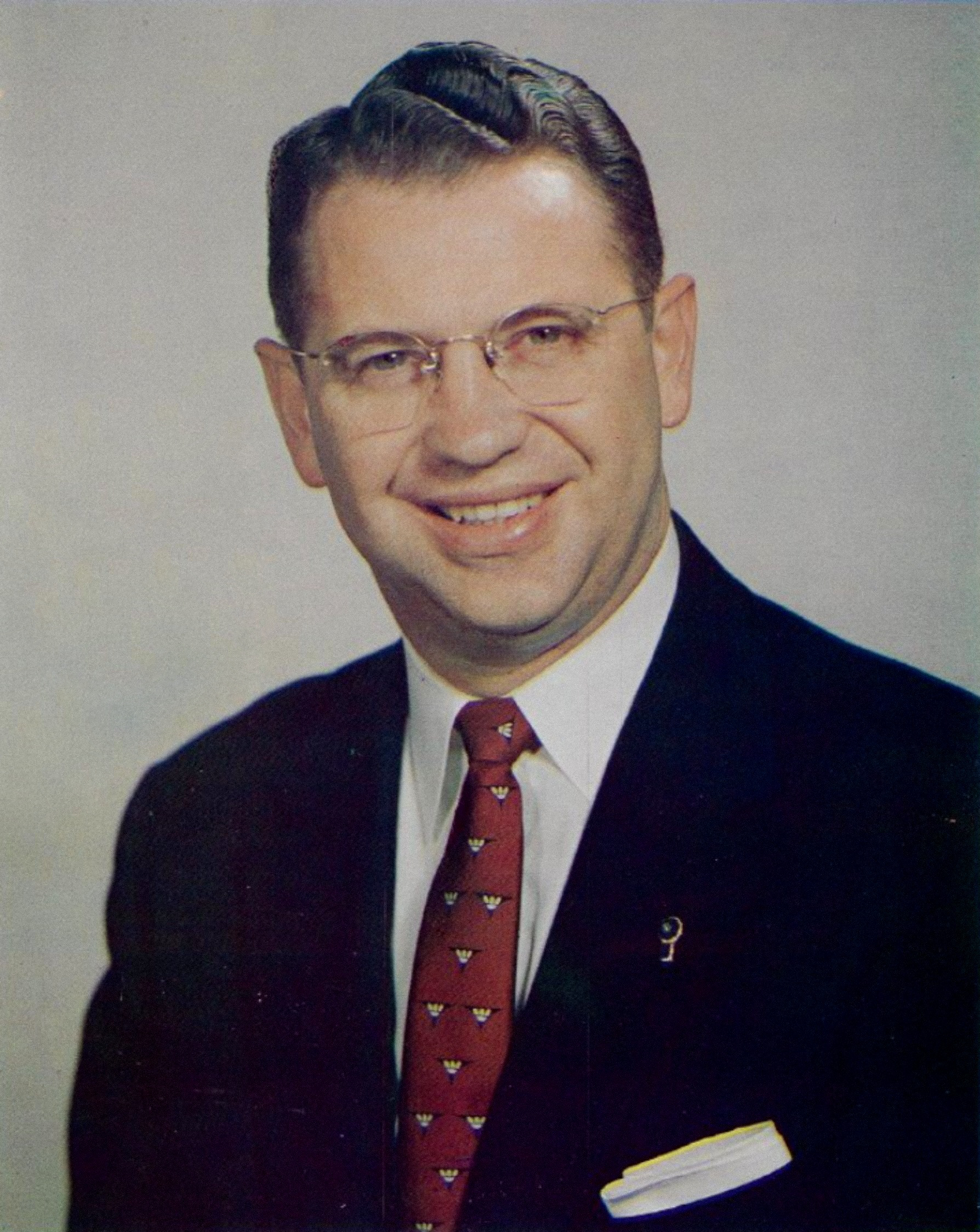
- Hartke in 1958

United States Senator from Indiana
- In office January 3, 1959 – January 3, 1977
- Preceded by: William E. Jenner
- Succeeded by: Richard Lugar

Chair of the Senate Committee on Veterans' Affairs
- In office January 3, 1971 – January 3, 1977
- Preceded by: Office created
- Succeeded by: Alan Cranston

Mayor of Evansville, Indiana
- In office 1956–1958
- Preceded by: Henry O. Roberts
- Succeeded by: J. William Davidson

Personal details
- Born: Rupert Vance Hartke; May 31, 1919 Stendal, Indiana, U.S.
- Died: July 27, 2003 (aged 84) Fairfax, Virginia, U.S.
- Resting place: Arlington National Cemetery
- Party: Democratic
- Spouse: Martha Hartke
- Children: 7
- Education: University of Evansville; Indiana University School of Law - Bloomington
- Profession: Attorney

Military service
- Branch/service: United States Navy; United States Coast Guard
- Years of service: 1942–1946
- Rank: Lieutenant
- Battles/wars: World War II

Rupert Vance Hartke (May 31, 1919 – July 27, 2003) was an American politician who served as a Democratic United States senator from Indiana from 1959 until 1977. Hartke was elected to the Senate after serving as the mayor of Evansville, Indiana. In the Senate, he supported the Great Society and became a prominent opponent of the Vietnam War. Hartke ran for president in the 1972 Democratic primaries but withdrew after the first set of primaries. He left the Senate after losing his 1976 reelection campaign to Richard Lugar.

== Early life, education, military service ==
Hartke was born on May 31, 1919, in Stendal, Indiana, the son of Ida Mary (Egbert), an organist, and Hugo Leonard Hartke, a teacher. His paternal grandparents were German, as were all of his maternal great-grandparents. He attended public schools in Stendal. He graduated from Evansville College (now the University of Evansville) in 1940, and served in the United States Navy and United States Coast Guard from 1942 to 1946, rising from seaman to lieutenant. Hartke graduated from the Indiana University Maurer School of Law in 1948.

== Legal and political career ==
After joining the Indiana State Bar in 1948, Hartke began practicing law in Evansville. He also worked as deputy prosecuting attorney of Vanderburgh County (1950–1951) and mayor of Evansville (1956–1958), integrating the city swimming pools, before being elected to the United States Senate in 1958 and reelected in 1964 and 1970.

== Senate service and later life ==
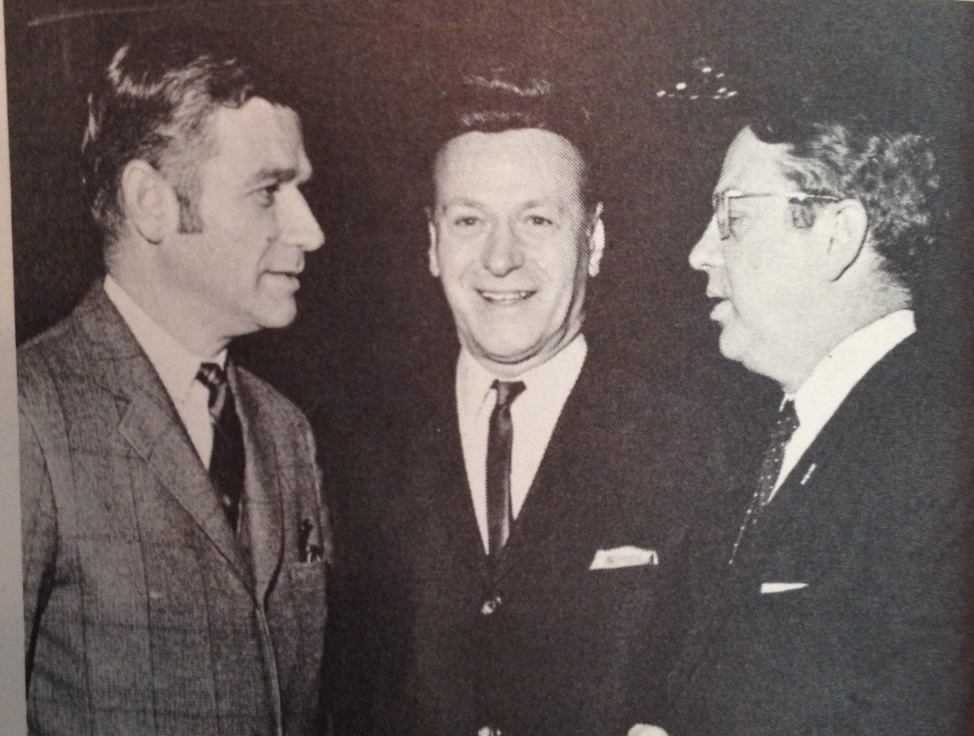
Hartke (right) with Senator Mark Hatfield (left) and George Barasch (center) in 1968

In the U.S. Senate, Hartke was best known for his opposition to the Vietnam War and his chairmanship of the Senate Veterans Affairs Committee. He fell out with President Lyndon B. Johnson when he became one of the Vietnam War's first opponents.

Hartke was elected to the Senate in 1958 at age 39, defeating Republican Governor Harold Handley. He became known as a hard-working, liberal Democrat with a strong relationship with Senate Majority Leader Lyndon B. Johnson. In his first term, Hartke was a member of the Finance and Commerce committees, lobbied for programs like Medicare and Medicaid, and supported the Civil Rights Act of 1964.

Hartke was reelected over state Senator Russell Bontrager in 1964, becoming only the third Indiana Democrat, after Benjamin Franklin Shively in 1914 and Frederick Van Nuys in 1938, to be popularly elected to a second Senate term. He helped create student loan programs and new veterans' benefits during his second term. He also helped to establish Amtrak as chair of the Subcommittee on Surface Transportation.

After his sister, Ruth E. Hartke, was killed in a head-on crash in Ohio in 1964 while working his campaign, Hartke used his chairmanship of Commerce Transportation Subcommittee to require that automakers equip cars with seat belts and other safety equipment. He also was instrumental in creating the International Executive Service Corps, an organization modeled after the Peace Corps that sent retired U.S. businessmen to poor countries to help turn small businesses into larger ones.

Hartke was credited with important roles in passing measures that created or supported student loan programs, veterans' benefits, and the Head Start Program. He introduced a bill to create the George Washington Peace Academy and a Department of Peace. The concept became known as the first cornerstone for the campaign that led to the creation of the U.S. Institute of Peace.

Hartke was praised for winning passage of a measure making kidney dialysis more widely available. A statement entered into the Congressional Record in honor of his 80th birthday credited the measure with saving 500,000 lives.

His opposition to the Vietnam War was not popular in Indiana. In 1970, after a very bitter and tight race against Republican Congressman Richard L. Roudebush and a ballot recount, Hartke won a third term by 4,283 votes. In 1972, he was an unsuccessful candidate for the Democratic Party's presidential nomination against Senators Edmund Muskie and George McGovern. In 1976, after narrowly surviving a primary challenge by freshman Eighth District Congressman Philip Hayes, Hartke lost the general Senate election to Indianapolis Mayor Richard Lugar in a landslide. Until Joe Donnelly was elected in 2012, Hartke was the most recent Indiana Democrat, aside from a member of the Bayh family, to be elected to and serve in the U.S. Senate.

In 1994, Hartke pleaded guilty to a misdemeanor election fraud charge in southeastern Indiana's Dearborn County. During the previous November's general election, a Kentucky-based casino firm had employed him as a consultant to support it during a casino-legalization referendum.

Hartke wrote three books—The American Crisis in Vietnam, You and Your Senator, and Inside the New Frontier, the last co-authored with John M. Redding.

== Personal life and death ==
Hartke and his wife, Martha, had seven children. Their daughter Anita Hartke was the 2008 Democratic nominee for the United States House of Representatives from the 7th congressional district of Virginia. She lost to the Republican incumbent, Eric Cantor.

Hartke died at a hospital in Fairfax, Virginia on July 27, 2003, aged 84.

== Posthumous award ==
In 2009, Hartke received the JFK Club of Vanderburgh County's John F. Kennedy Profiles in Courage Posthumous Award, "to carry forward the legacy and principles of President John F. Kennedy by supporting legislation and government officials or candidates that promote social justice and equality, in order to build a better community and society for all."

== Electoral history ==
1955 Evansville, Indiana mayoral election
Party	Candidate	Votes	%
Democratic	R. Vance Hartke	25,862	54.12%
Republican	Curtis E. Huber	21,699	45.40%
Prohibition	William C. Christmas	230	0.48%
Majority		4,163	8.71%
Total votes		47,791	
Democratic gain from Republican			

1958 United States Senate election in Indiana
Party	Candidate	Votes	%
Democratic	Vance Hartke	973,636	56.47%
Republican	Harold W. Handley	731,635	42.43%
Prohibition	John Stelle	19,040	1.10%
Majority		242,001	14.04%
Turnout		1,724,311	
Democratic hold			

1964 United States Senate election in Indiana
Party	Candidate	Votes	%
Democratic	Vance Hartke (incumbent)	1,128,505	54.33%
Republican	D. Russell Bontrager	941,519	45.33%
Prohibition	J. Ralston Miller	5,708	0.27%
Socialist Labor	Casimer Kanczuzewski	1,231	0.06%
Majority		187,986	9.00%
Turnout		2,076,963	
Democratic hold			

1970 United States Senate election in Indiana
Party	Candidate	Votes	%
Democratic	Vance Hartke (incumbent)	870,990	50.12%
Republican	Richard L. Roudebush	866,707	49.88%
Majority		4,283	0.24%
Turnout		1,737,697	
Democratic hold			

Cumulative results of the 1972 Democratic Party presidential primaries
Party	Candidate	Votes	%
Democratic	Hubert Humphrey	4,121,372	25.34
Democratic	George McGovern	4,053,451	25.34
Democratic	George Wallace	3,755,424	23.48
Democratic	Edmund Muskie	1,840,217	11.51
Democratic	Eugene McCarthy	553,990	3.46
Democratic	Henry M. Jackson	505,198	3.16
Democratic	Shirley Chisholm	430,703	2.69
Democratic	Terry Sanford	331,415	2.07
Democratic	John Lindsay	196,406	1.23
Democratic	Sam Yorty	79,446	0.50
Democratic	Wilbur Mills	37,401	0.23
Democratic	Vance Hartke	11,798	0.07
Democratic	Patsy Mink	8,286	0.05

1972 Democratic National Convention delegate count (1,509 delegates needed to secure nomination)
Party	Candidate	Votes	%
Democratic	George McGovern	1,864.95	
Democratic	Henry M. Jackson	525	
Democratic	George Wallace	381.7	
Democratic	Shirley Chisholm	151.95	
Democratic	Terry Sanford	77.5	
Democratic	Hubert Humphrey	66.7	
Democratic	Wilbur Mills	33.8	
Democratic	Edmund Muskie	24.3	
Democratic	Edward M. Kennedy	12.7	
Democratic	Sam Yorty	10	
Democratic	Wayne Hays	5	
Democratic	John Lindsay	5	
Democratic	Fred Harris	2	
Democratic	Eugene McCarthy	2	
Democratic	Walter Mondale	2	
Democratic	Ramsey Clark	1	
Democratic	Walter Fauntroy	1	
Democratic	Vance Hartke	1	
Democratic	Harold Hughes	1	
Democratic	Patsy Mink	1	

1976 United States Senate election in Indiana
Party	Candidate	Votes	%
Republican	Richard Lugar	1,275,833	59.03%
Democratic	Vance Hartke (incumbent)	868,522	40.19%
Independent politician	Don L. Lee	14,321	0.66%
U.S. Labor	David Lee Hoagland	2,511	0.12%
Majority		407,311	18.85%
Turnout		2,161,187	
Republican gain from Democratic			

Party political offices
Preceded by Henry F. Schricker	Democratic nominee for U.S. Senator from Indiana (Class 1); 1958, 1964, 1970, 1976	Succeeded by Floyd Fithian
U.S. Senate
Preceded by William E. Jenner	U.S. senator (Class 1) from Indiana; 1959–1977; Served alongside: Homer E. Capehart, Birch Bayh	Succeeded by Richard Lugar
Political offices
New title Committee Created	Chairman of the Senate Veterans' Affairs Committee; 1971–1977	Succeeded by Alan Cranston
