= William E. Jenner =

American politician (1908–1985)

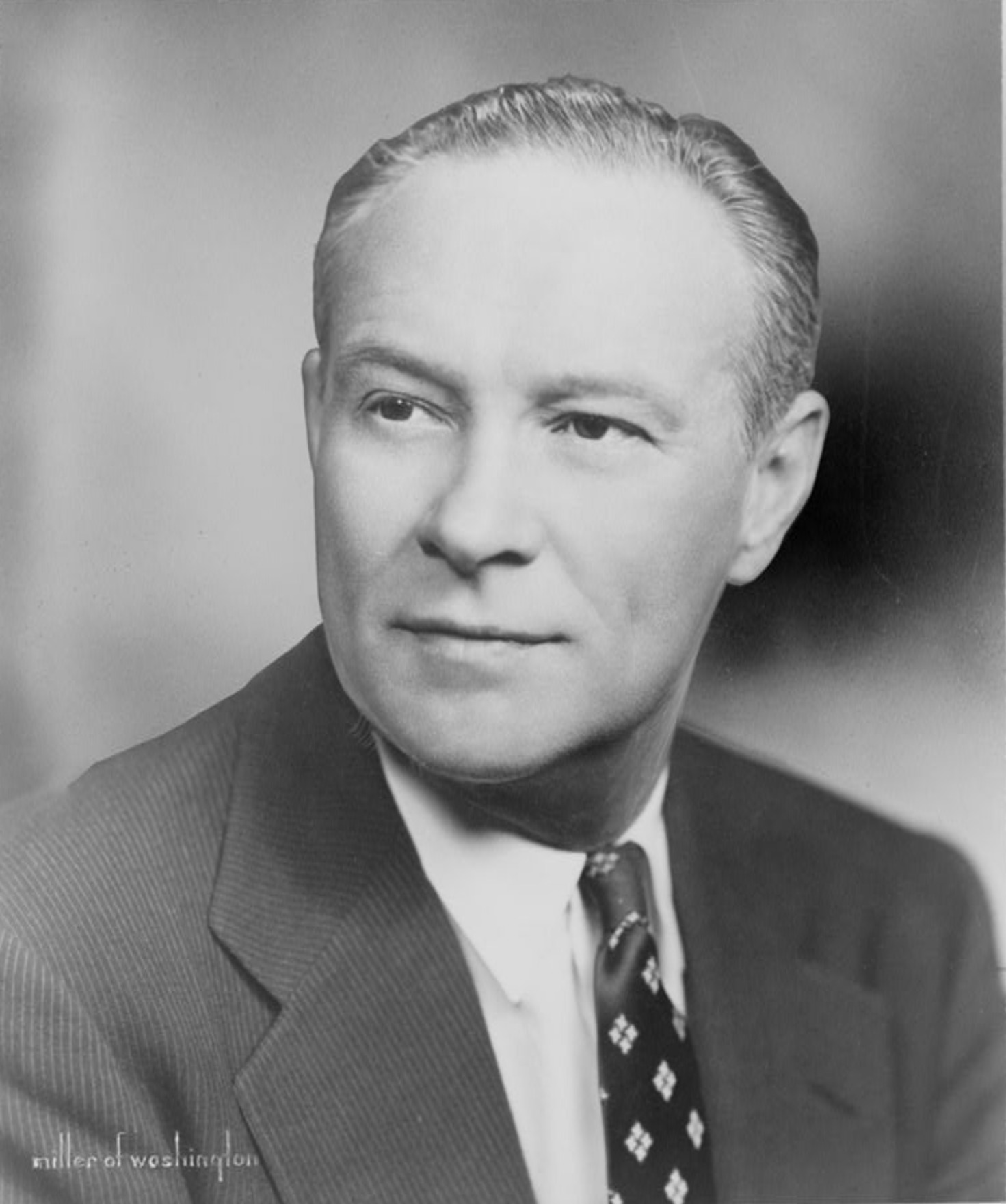

United States Senator from Indiana
- In office January 3, 1947 – January 3, 1959
- Preceded by: Raymond E. Willis
- Succeeded by: Vance Hartke
- In office November 14, 1944 – January 3, 1945
- Preceded by: Samuel D. Jackson
- Succeeded by: Homer E. Capehart

Member of the Indiana Senate from Lawrence County, Martin County, and Orange County
- In office November 7, 1934 – June 1, 1942
- Preceded by: John Carle Sherwood
- Succeeded by: James Edward Armstrong

Personal details
- Born: July 21, 1908 Marengo, Indiana, U.S.
- Died: March 9, 1985 (aged 76) Bedford, Indiana, U.S.
- Party: Republican
- Spouse: Janet Paterson Cuthill
- Education: Indiana University Bloomington
- Profession: Lawyer

William Ezra Jenner (July 21, 1908 – March 9, 1985) was an American lawyer and politician from the state of Indiana. A Republican, Jenner was an Indiana state senator from 1934 to 1942, and a U.S. senator from 1944 to 1945 and again from 1947 to 1959. In the Senate, Jenner was a supporter of McCarthyism.

== Background ==
Jenner was born in Marengo, Indiana, on July 21, 1908, to L.L. Woody and Jane McDonald Jenner.

He attended Lake Placid Preparatory School in New York before attending Indiana University Bloomington, where he graduated in 1930. Jenner worked as an elevator operator in the old House Office Building while attending night classes at the George Washington University Law School. Jenner later graduated with a law degree from Indiana University School of Law – Bloomington.

== Career ==
After law, Jenner practiced law in Paoli and later in Shoals.

=== Indiana Senate ===
Jenner entered politics in 1934, when he was first elected to the Indiana State Senate in 1934. He was minority leader from 1937 to 1939, and then majority leader and president pro tempore from 1939 to 1941.

In 1940, Jenner ran for Governor of Indiana, finishing second at the Republican state convention.

In 1942, during World War II, Jenner resigned his seat to become a first lieutenant in the U.S. Army Air Corps. Jenner was discharged in 1944 at the rank of captain.

=== U.S. Senate ===
One month after his discharge from the Army Air Corps, Jenner was elected to the U.S. Senate seat that had been vacated by the death of Frederick Van Nuys. He served the last few months of Van Nuys's term from November 14, 1944, to January 3, 1945; he was not a candidate for the full six-year term that began in 1945. Jenner was the first veteran of World War II elected to the Senate and the youngest member of the Senate.

He ran for the Senate in 1946 defeating Congressman Charles M. La Follette 1,994 to 105 at the Republican state convention. He then won the general election by over 150,000 votes.

He ran for governor of Indiana for a second time in 1948, winning a plurality on the first ballot at the Republican state convention. Jenner lost the nomination on the second ballot to Holbart Creighton 885 to 931.

Jenner was re-elected to the Senate in 1952. Jenner voted in favor of the Senate amendment to the Civil Rights Act of 1957 on August 7, 1957, but did not vote on the House amendment to the bill on August 29, 1957.

=== McCarthyism ===
In Congress, Jenner was the chairman of the Committee on Rules and Administration during the Eighty-Third Congress.

He was also a member of the Subcommittee on Internal Security. He was a strong supporter and friend of Joseph McCarthy and engaged in McCarthyism. Jenner and McCarthy were both part of "a core of isolationist Republicans in the Senate" along with Herman Welker of Idaho and George W. Malone of Nevada. In 1950, when McCarthy accused a number of State Department employees of being secret Communists (see Tydings Committee), Jenner supported him, claiming that the State Department had engaged in "the most scandalous and brazen whitewash of treasonable conspiracy in our history" and stating: "Considering the fact that we are now at war... how can we get the Reds out of Korea if we cannot get them out of Washington?" When McCarthy was censured by the Senate in 1954, Jenner gave a speech suggesting that the censure resolution "was initiated by the Communist conspiracy."

In the Senate, Jenner was a strident opponent of General George Marshall, who was appointed Secretary of Defense in 1950. During the confirmation debate, Jenner and McCarthy formed part of a group of militantly anti-communist Republican Senators that attacked Marshall. Jenner "delivered a shrill, hour-long attack on the nominee" in which he also disparaged President Harry S. Truman and Secretary of State Dean Acheson. Using McCarthyist rhetoric, Jenner accused the Truman administration of "bloody tracks of treason" and called Marshall "a living lie" who was "joining hands once more with this criminal crowd of traitors and Communist appeasers... under the direction of Mr. Truman and Mr. Acheson." Jenner also "denounced and blamed Marshall for the Pearl Harbor defeat and for his role in helping FDR 'trick America into a war,' the extension of lend-lease to the Communist Soviet Union, the 'selling out' of Eastern Europe at Yalta, the loss of China, and the inclusion of an offer of aid to the Soviet Union under the Marshall Plan." When Marshall was informed of Jenner's speech, the former general replied: "Jenner? Jenner? I do not believe I know the man."

In 1951, after President Truman dismissed General Douglas MacArthur for insubordination, Jenner gave a speech on the floor of the Senate in which he said: "I charge that this country today is in the hands of a secret inner coterie, which is directed by agents of the Soviet Government. Our only choice is to impeach President Truman and find out who is the secret invisible government."

Jenner introduced legislation that sought to strip the Supreme Court of jurisdiction "in all the areas where it had interfered with the anticommunist program," a measure that Senator Lyndon B. Johnson maneuvered to oppose. Ultimately, Jenner's measure was tabled by a vote of 49–41.

A consistent opponent of American foreign aid and of any involvement in foreign affairs, he opposed U.S. participation in the North Atlantic Treaty Organization and had other isolationist positions. During his tenure, right-wingers wanted Jenner to run for president as a far-right third-party candidate.

Jenner claimed that the United Nations had infiltrated the American educational system in 1952.

In 1958, he did not seek re-nomination.

=== Later life ===
After leaving the Senate, Jenner practiced law in Indianapolis and was the owner of the Seaway Corporation, a land development company. He also owned farms in Indiana and Illinois.

== Personal life and death ==
In 1933, Jenner married Janet Paterson Cuthill (1908–2002) and had a son, William Edward Jenner (1942–2019).

William Ezra Jenner died age 76 on March 9, 1985, of a respiratory illness at Dunn Memorial Hospital in Bedford, Indiana.

Jenner was interred at Crest Haven Memorial Gardens in Bedford, Indiana.

Party political offices
Preceded by Raymond E. Willis	Republican nominee for U.S. Senator from Indiana (Class 3); 1944	Succeeded by Homer E. Capehart
Preceded by Raymond E. Willis	Republican nominee for U.S. Senator from Indiana (Class 1); 1946, 1952	Succeeded by Harold W. Handley
U.S. Senate
Preceded by Samuel D. Jackson	U.S. senator (Class 3) from Indiana; 1944–1945; Served alongside: Raymond E. Willis	Succeeded by Homer E. Capehart
Preceded by Raymond E. Willis	U.S. senator (Class 1) from Indiana; 1947–1959; Served alongside: Homer E. Capehart	Succeeded by Vance Hartke
