= 1976 United States Senate election in Indiana =

- November 2, 1976
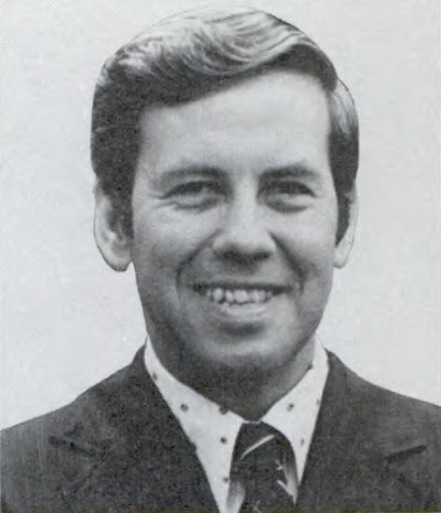

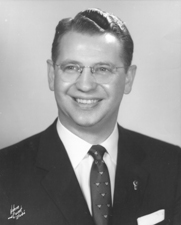
Nominee	Richard Lugar	Vance Hartke
Party	Republican	Democratic
Popular vote	1,275,833	878,522
Percentage	58.76%	40.46%
- County results Lugar: 50–60% 60–70% 70–80% Hartke: 50–60% 60–70%
U.S. senator before election
Vance Hartke
Democratic
Elected U.S. Senator
Richard Lugar
Republican

The 1976 United States Senate election in Indiana took place on November 2, 1976. Incumbent Democratic U.S. Senator Vance Hartke ran for re-election to a fourth term, but was defeated by Republican challenger, Indianapolis Mayor Richard Lugar, who defeated Hartke in a landslide. Hartke was challenged by Representative Philip H. Hayes which he was able to survive, but this internal party conflict ultimately left Hartke with fewer resources and significantly damaged his chances against Lugar, contributing to his landslide defeat.

== Democratic primary ==
=== Candidates ===
- Vance Hartke, Incumbent U.S. Senator since 1959
- Philip H. Hayes, U.S. Representative from Evansville

=== Results ===
1976 Democratic Senate primary
Party	Candidate	Votes	%
Democratic	Vance Hartke (incumbent)	304,076	53.08%
Democratic	Philip H. Hayes	268,790	46.92%
Total votes		572,866	100.00%

== Republican primary ==
=== Candidates ===
- William P. Costas, businessman from Valparaiso
- Richard Lugar, former Mayor of Indianapolis and nominee for Senate in 1974
- Edgar Whitcomb, former governor of Indiana

=== Results ===
1976 Republican Senate primary
Party	Candidate	Votes	%
Republican	Richard Lugar	393,064	65.45%
Republican	Edgar Whitcomb	179,203	29.84%
Republican	William P. Costas	28,329	4.72%
Total votes		600,596	100.00%

== Results ==
General election results
Party	Candidate	Votes	%
Republican	Richard Lugar	1,275,833	58.76%
Democratic	Vance Hartke (incumbent)	878,522	40.46%
Independent politician	Don L. Lee	14,321	0.66%
U.S. Labor	David Lee Hoagland	2,511	0.12%
Majority		397,311	18.30%
Turnout		2,171,187	
Republican gain from Democratic			

== See also ==
- 1976 United States Senate elections
