= David Cornwell =

David Cornwell may refer to:

- John le Carré (1931–2020), pseudonym of David John Moore Cornwell, English writer of espionage novels
- David L. Cornwell (1945–2012), U.S. Representative from Indiana
