= 1964 United States Senate election in Indiana =

- November 3, 1964
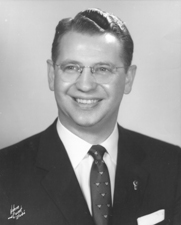

Nominee	Vance Hartke	D. Russell Bontrager
Party	Democratic	Republican
Popular vote	1,128,505	941,519
Percentage	54.33%	45.33%
- County results Hartke: 50–60% 60–70% Bontrager: 40–50% 50–60% 60–70%
U.S. senator before election
Vance Hartke
Democratic
Elected U.S. Senator
Vance Hartke
Democratic

The 1964 United States Senate election in Indiana took place on November 3, 1964. Incumbent Democratic U.S. Senator Vance Hartke was re-elected to a second term in office over Republican D. Russell Bontrager.

== General election ==
=== Candidates ===
- D. Russell Bontrager, State Senator (Republican)
- Vance Hartke, incumbent U.S. Senator since 1959 (Democratic)
- Casimer Kanczuzewski (Socialist Labor)
- J. Ralston Miller (Prohibition)

== Results ==
General election results
Party	Candidate	Votes	%	±%
Democratic	Vance Hartke (inc.)	1,128,505	54.33%	▼2.13
Republican	D. Russell Bontrager	941,519	45.33%	▲2.91
Prohibition	J. Ralston Miller	5,708	0.28%	▼0.84
Socialist Labor	Casimer Kanczuzewski	1,231	0.06%	N/A
Total votes		2,076,963	100.00%	
Democratic hold				

== See also ==
- 1964 United States Senate elections
