= Raymond E. Willis =

American politician

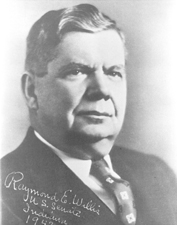

United States Senator from Indiana
- In office January 3, 1941 – January 3, 1947
- Preceded by: Sherman Minton
- Succeeded by: William E. Jenner

Member of the Indiana House of Representatives from the LaGrange and Steuben counties district
- In office November 6, 1918 – November 8, 1922
- Preceded by: Robert William McClaskey
- Succeeded by: Murdo (Max) C. Murray

Personal details
- Born: Raymond Eugene Willis; August 11, 1875 Waterloo, Indiana, U.S.
- Died: March 21, 1956 (aged 80) Angola, Indiana, U.S.
- Party: Republican
- Relations: Mary J. Hornaday (niece)
- Education: Wabash College
- Profession: Publisher

Raymond Eugene Willis (August 11, 1875 – March 21, 1956) was a United States senator from Indiana. Born in Waterloo, Indiana, he attended the public schools and graduated from Wabash College in 1896. He learned the printer's trade in Waterloo and moved to Angola, Indiana, and engaged in the newspaper publishing business in 1898. He was postmaster of Angola from 1910 to 1914 and during the First World War he served as chairman of Steuben County Council of Defense, 1917–1918.

From 1918 to 1922, Willis was a member of the Indiana House of Representatives. He was an unsuccessful candidate for election to the U.S. Senate in 1938, losing to moderate incumbent Democrat Frederick Van Nuys by about 5,100 votes; he was elected as a Republican to the Senate in 1940, narrowly unseating Democratic Sherman Minton, and served from January 3, 1941, to January 3, 1947. He was not a candidate for renomination in 1946 and resumed the publishing business as president of the Steuben Printing Co., and was also trustee of Tri-State University at Angola. He died in Angola in 1956; interment was in Circle Hill Cemetery.

Party political offices
Preceded by James Eli Watson	Republican nominee for U.S. Senator from Indiana (Class 3); 1938	Succeeded by William E. Jenner
Preceded by Arthur Raymond Robinson	Republican nominee for U.S. Senator from Indiana (Class 1); 1940	Succeeded by William E. Jenner
U.S. Senate
Preceded by Sherman Minton	U.S. senator (Class 3) from Indiana; 1941–1947; Served alongside: Frederick Van Nuys, Samuel D. Jackson, William E. Jenner, Homer E. Capeheart	Succeeded by William E. Jenner
