= Mary J. Hornaday =

American journalist

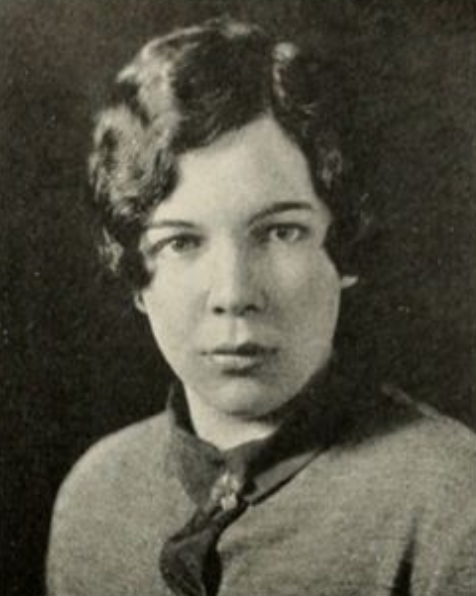
- Mary J. Hornaday, from the 1927 yearbook of Swarthmore College
- Born: April 5, 1906; Washington, D.C., U.S.
- Died: April 20, 1982 (age 76); Riverdale, New York, U.S.
- Occupation: Journalist
- Relatives: Raymond E. Willis (uncle)

Mary Josephine Hornaday (April 5, 1906 – April 20, 1982) was an American journalist. She was vice president of the Overseas Press Club of America in 1952 and in 1965, while she was working for The Christian Science Monitor.

== Early life and education ==
Hornaday was born in Washington, D.C., the daughter of James Parks Hornaday and Mary Gertrude Willis Hornaday. Her father was chief of the Washington bureau of the Indianapolis News; brothers Fred, James, and Hilton, and her uncle William, also worked in journalism. Her maternal uncle, Raymond E. Willis, was a United States senator from Indiana. She graduated from Swarthmore College in 1927.

== Career ==
Hornaday began as a reporter for The Christian Science Monitor in 1927, at the Washington bureau. In 1932 she interviewed First Lady Lou Henry Hoover about Girl Scouting. In 1936 she served as president of the Women's National Press Club. She knew Eleanor Roosevelt well, and chaired Roosevelt's press conferences at the White House. She went to London after World War II to cover postwar relief efforts. Hornaday reported from the magazine's West Coast bureau from 1946 to 1950. In 1952, and again in 1965, she was vice-president of the Overseas Press Club of America. In the 1950s and 1960s she covered the United Nations from the New York bureau.

== Selected publications ==
- "Cuban Prisoner Release Pushed" (1962)
- "American to Fly Aid to Cuban Needy" (1963)
- "Oswald's Mother Tells her Version" (1964)

== Personal life ==
Hornaday died in 1982, at the age of 76, in Riverdale, New York.
