= 1958 United States Senate election in Indiana =

- November 4, 1958
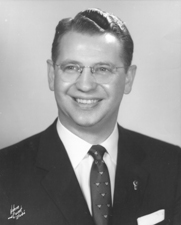

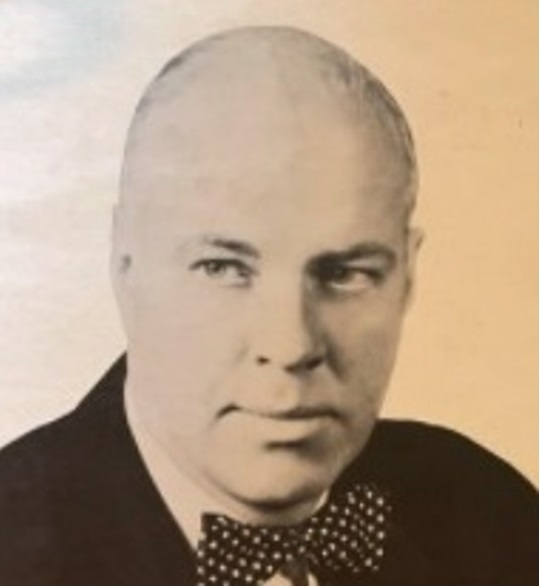
Nominee	Vance Hartke	Harold W. Handley
Party	Democratic	Republican
Popular vote	973,636	731,635
Percentage	56.46%	42.42%
- County results Hartke: 40–50% 50–60% 60–70% Handley: 40–50% 50–60% 60–70%
U.S. senator before election
William E. Jenner
Republican
Elected U.S. Senator
Vance Hartke
Democratic

The 1958 United States Senate election in Indiana was held on November 4, 1958. Outgoing Senator William E. Jenner, a Republican, retired and was succeeded by Democrat Vance Hartke, the mayor of Evansville, Indiana. Hartke defeated Harold W. Handley, the conservative Governor of Indiana and a close friend of Jenner.

This was one of 15 seats held by Republicans gained by the Democratic Party in the 1958 United States Senate elections.

== General election ==
=== Campaign ===
When Jenner elected to forgo a third full term in office ahead of the 1958 election, he intended his friend and protégé Governor Harold W. Handley to be his successor. With the help of Lieutenant Governor Crawford F. Parker, they hatched a plan for both Jenner and Handley to resign before the election; Parker would then become governor and appoint Handley to the vacant Senate seat. Handley's rivals within the party predicted the scheme would "set the Republican Party back an entire generation." The plan was never implemented, and Jenner served out the remainder of his term.

Handley had been elected governor only two years before and had pledged during that campaign to serve the duration of his four-year term. Campaigning for the Senate was perceived as a violation of that pledge, as Handley would be forced to resign the governorship early if elected. Handley was hurt as well by another broken campaign promise, a significant tax increase he had ushered through the Indiana General Assembly. High unemployment coupled with Handley's tacit endorsement of the state right-to-work law damaged his standing with working class and union voters.

Hartke, the Democratic nominee, ran a disciplined campaign that capitalized on Handley's weaknesses. On election day, he took 56.5% of the statewide vote, winning the first of three terms he would serve between 1959 and 1977.

=== Results ===
General election results
Party	Candidate	Votes	%	±%
Democratic	Vance Hartke	973,636	56.46%	▲9.64
Republican	Harold W. Handley	731,635	42.42%	▼10.02
Prohibition	John R. Stelle	19,327	1.12%	▲0.47
Total votes		1,724,598	100.00%	N/A
Democratic gain from Republican				

== See also ==
- 1958 United States Senate elections
