= American College of Monaco =

Former college in Monte Carlo, Monaco

Coordinates: 43°44′19.55″N 7°25′37.8″E

The American College of Monaco was an American tertiary education institution located in Monte Carlo, Monaco. It operated from 1968 until it went bankrupt in 1970. The college offered a four-year degree program and classes were held in hotels. Prince Rainier III was the college's chancellor, and it was established by the Principality at the request of Princess Grace.

== History ==
The American College of Monaco was established at the request of Princess Grace, who tasked her brother Kell Kelly with recruiting prominent American and French individuals to sit on the college's board of directors. In 1968, the college was founded by a group of Philadelphia businessmen. The college was incorporated in Philadelphia, Pennsylvania even though it was located in Monte Carlo, Monaco. The school's first president and chief executive officer was Arnold Fletcher.

The college held classes in the Hotel Hermitage behind the Hotel de Paris, and the famous Monte Carlo Casino during its first academic year. After that, the school relocated to the Hotel Splendid, on the border of Beausoleil. Prince Rainier III was the Chancellor of the school. Oceanographers Jacques Yves Cousteau and Athelstan Spilhaus were members of the college's Board of Academic Overseers.

In 1969, members of the college's board accused one of its members of running off with the school's funding. The teachers, having been unpaid for a semester, held meetings and took action, and some resigned. The college's administration agreed to guarantee salary payments until the spring of 1970. The American College of Monaco filed for bankruptcy in Philadelphia in 1970. The school had 30 students in its 1970 class, down from 100 in its 1968 class.

== Notable alumni ==
- David Lance Cornwell (1969) - a United States congressman who represented Indiana
