= 1970 United States Senate election in Indiana =

- November 3, 1970
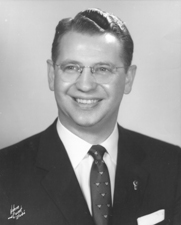

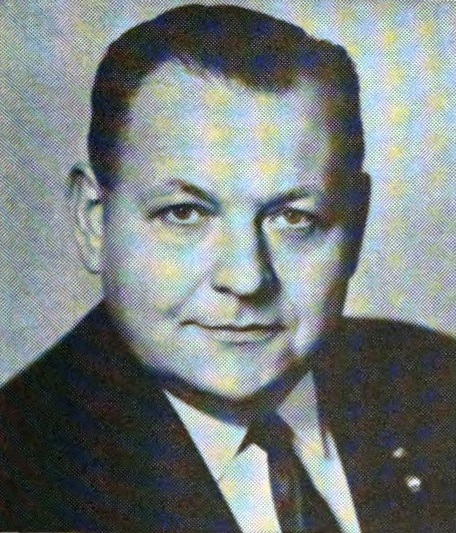
| Nominee | Vance Hartke | Richard Roudebush |
| Party | Democratic | Republican |
| Popular vote | 870,990 | 866,707 |
| Percentage | 50.12% | 49.88% |
- County results Hartke: 50–60% 60–70% Roudebush: 50–60% 60–70% 70–80%
U.S. senator before election
Vance Hartke
Democratic
Elected U.S. Senator
Vance Hartke
Democratic

The 1970 United States Senate election in Indiana took place on November 3, 1970. Incumbent Democratic U.S. Senator Vance Hartke was narrowly re-elected to a third term in office over Republican U.S. Representative Richard Roudebush. As of 2024, this is the last time that an incumbent Democratic Senator from Indiana won re-election for this seat.

== General election ==
=== Candidates ===
- Vance Hartke, incumbent U.S. Senator since 1959
- Richard Roudebush, U.S. Representative from Noblesville

== Results ==
General election results
| Party | Candidate | Votes | % | ±% |
|---|---|---|---|---|
| Democratic | Vance Hartke (inc.) | 870,990 | 50.12% | ▼4.21 |
| Republican | Richard Roudebush | 866,707 | 49.88% | ▲4.55 |
| Total votes | | 1,737,697 | 100.00% | |
| Democratic hold | | | | |

=== Recount Dispute ===
One day after the Secretary of State certified Hartke as the winner, Roudebush filed a petition for a recount in state court. The state court appointed a three-person commission to oversee the recount. In response, Hartke sought an injunction against a recount, arguing that under Article I Section 5 of the Constitution, the Senate has the sole power to judge its own members. The district court granted the injunction. Roudebush appealed the district court's decision, and the case was granted cert by the U.S. Supreme Court. While the case was before the Supreme Court, Hartke was administered the oath of office and seated.

The Supreme Court, in Roudebush v. Hartke, ruled that a state had the broad powers to regulate election including recounts. Such a recount would not restrict the Senate from making its own determinations as to who to seat, with the Senate being allowed to conduct its own recount if it so chose. Even after the Senate had seated Hartke, a state recount would not violate Article I Section 5. Therefore, Indiana could conduct a recount.

The much awaited recount would show that Hartke was indeed the winner. On July 24, 1972, almost two years after the election, Hartke was seated without reservation in the United States Senate.

== See also ==
- 1970 United States Senate elections
