= Roger H. Zion =

American politician (1921–2019)

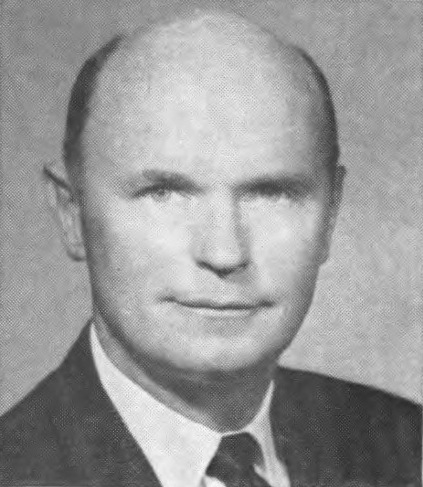

Member of the U.S. House of Representatives from Indiana's 8th district
- In office January 3, 1967 – January 3, 1975
- Preceded by: Winfield K. Denton
- Succeeded by: Philip H. Hayes

Personal details
- Born: September 17, 1921 Escanaba, Michigan, U.S.
- Died: September 24, 2019 (aged 98) Evansville, Indiana, U.S.
- Party: Republican
- Spouse: Marjorie Emma Knauss (m. 1945)
- Children: 3
- Education: University of Wisconsin–Madison; Harvard Graduate School of Business Administration

Military service
- Allegiance: United States of America
- Branch/service: United States Navy
- Years of service: 1943–1946
- Rank: Lieutenant
- Battles/wars: World War II

Roger Herschel Zion (September 17, 1921 – September 24, 2019) was an American World War II veteran and politician who served in the United States House of Representatives from Indiana from 1967 through 1975.

== Biography ==
Roger Zion was born in Escanaba, Michigan, in September 1921 and attended public schools in Milwaukee, Wisconsin, and Evansville, Indiana. He graduated from Benjamin Bosse High School and became an Eagle Scout in 1932. He received his Bachelor of Arts from the University of Wisconsin–Madison in 1943.

=== World War II ===
He served in the United States Navy from 1943 to 1946, serving in the Asia-Pacific area during World War II, and was discharged a lieutenant.

=== Post-war career ===
Zion attended Harvard Graduate School of Business Administration from 1944 to 1945. He became associated with Mead Johnson & Company, working for the company from 1946 through 1965; eventually becoming director of training and professional relations.

=== Congress ===
At the suggestion of D. Mead Johnson, chief of Mead Johnson, he ran for Congress in 1964 as Republican but was unsuccessful, losing to the incumbent Democrat Winfield K. Denton. However, running against Denton in the 1966 election, he unseated Denton. Beginning in the 90th Congress, he was re-elected to the three succeeding Congresses, serving from January 3, 1967, to January 3, 1975. In 1967, Zion called anti-Vietnam War protesters "traitors" and suggested that "any of them involved in illegal acts be treated comparably with Frenchmen whose heads were shaved if they were caught collaborating with the Germans in World War II." While in Congress and following his Congressional terms, he participated in various bridge tournaments against corporate executives including Warren Buffett and members of the British Parliament.

Zion was an unsuccessful candidate for reelection in 1974 to the 94th Congress, losing to state Senator Philip H. Hayes beginning a long line of frequent turnovers in the district known as the Bloody Eighth.

=== Later career and death ===
After leaving Congress, Zion became the president of Resources Development Inc. in Washington, D.C. As of 2011 he resided in Washington, D.C., but later moved back to Evansville.

He died in Evansville, Indiana on September 24, 2019, one week after his 98th birthday. He was survived by his wife of 74 years, the former Marjorie Emma Knauss, and three children.

== See also ==
- List of members of the House Un-American Activities Committee

U.S. House of Representatives
Preceded by Winfield K. Denton	United States Representative for the 8th District of Indiana; January 3, 1967 – January 3, 1975	Succeeded by Philip H. Hayes
