= 1946 United States Senate election in Indiana =

- November 5, 1946
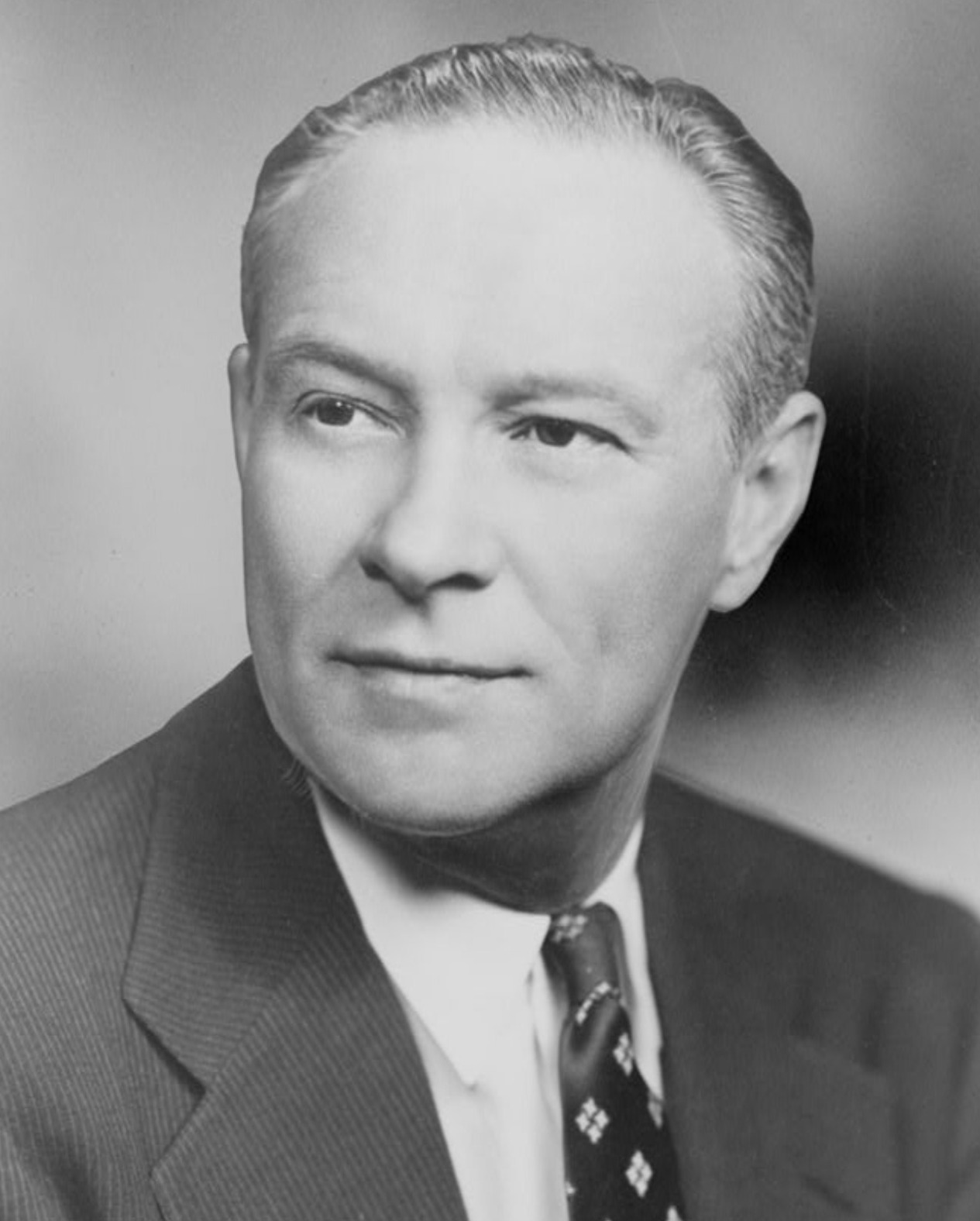

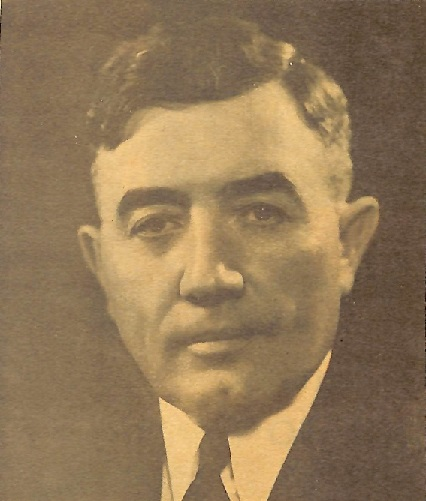
Nominee	William E. Jenner	M. Clifford Townsend
Party	Republican	Democratic
Popular vote	739,807	584,288
Percentage	54.91%	43.36%
- County results Jenner: 40–50% 50–60% 60–70% 70–80% Townsend: 40–50% 50–60%
U.S. senator before election
Raymond E. Willis
Republican
Elected U.S. Senator
William E. Jenner
Republican

The 1946 United States Senate election in Indiana took place on November 5, 1946. Incumbent Republican U.S. Senator Raymond E. Willis did not run for re-election. Former interim Senator William E. Jenner was elected over Governor of Indiana M. Clifford Townsend.

== Republican nomination ==
=== Candidates ===
- William E. Jenner, former U.S. Senator (1944–1945) and State Senator from Martin County
- Charles M. La Follette, U.S. Representative from Evansville

==== Withdrew ====
- Raymond E. Willis, incumbent Senator since 1941 (withdrew at convention)

=== Convention results ===
1946 Indiana Republican convention
Party	Candidate	Votes	%
Republican	William E. Jenner	1,994	95.07%
Republican	Charles M. La Follette	105	4.93%
Total votes		2,129	100.00%

== General election ==
=== Candidates ===
- William E. Jenner, former interim U.S. Senator (Republican)
- Elmer G. Johnson (Communist)
- John Marion Morris (Socialist Labor)
- M. Clifford Townsend, former Governor of Indiana (Democratic)
- Elmer D. Riggs (Prohibition)

=== Results ===
1946 U.S. Senate election in Indiana
Party	Candidate	Votes	%	±%
Republican	William E. Jenner	739,807	54.91%	▲4.46
Democratic	M. Clifford Townsend	584,288	43.36%	▼5.83
Prohibition	Elmer D. Riggs	21,008	1.56%	▲1.24
Socialist Labor	John Marion Morris	1,523	0.11%	N/A
Communist	Elmer G. Johnson	806	0.06%	N/A
Total votes		1,347,432	100.00%	
Republican hold				

== See also ==
- 1946 United States Senate elections
