= 1914 United States Senate election in Indiana =

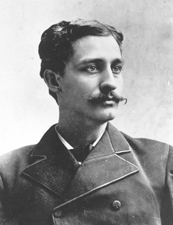

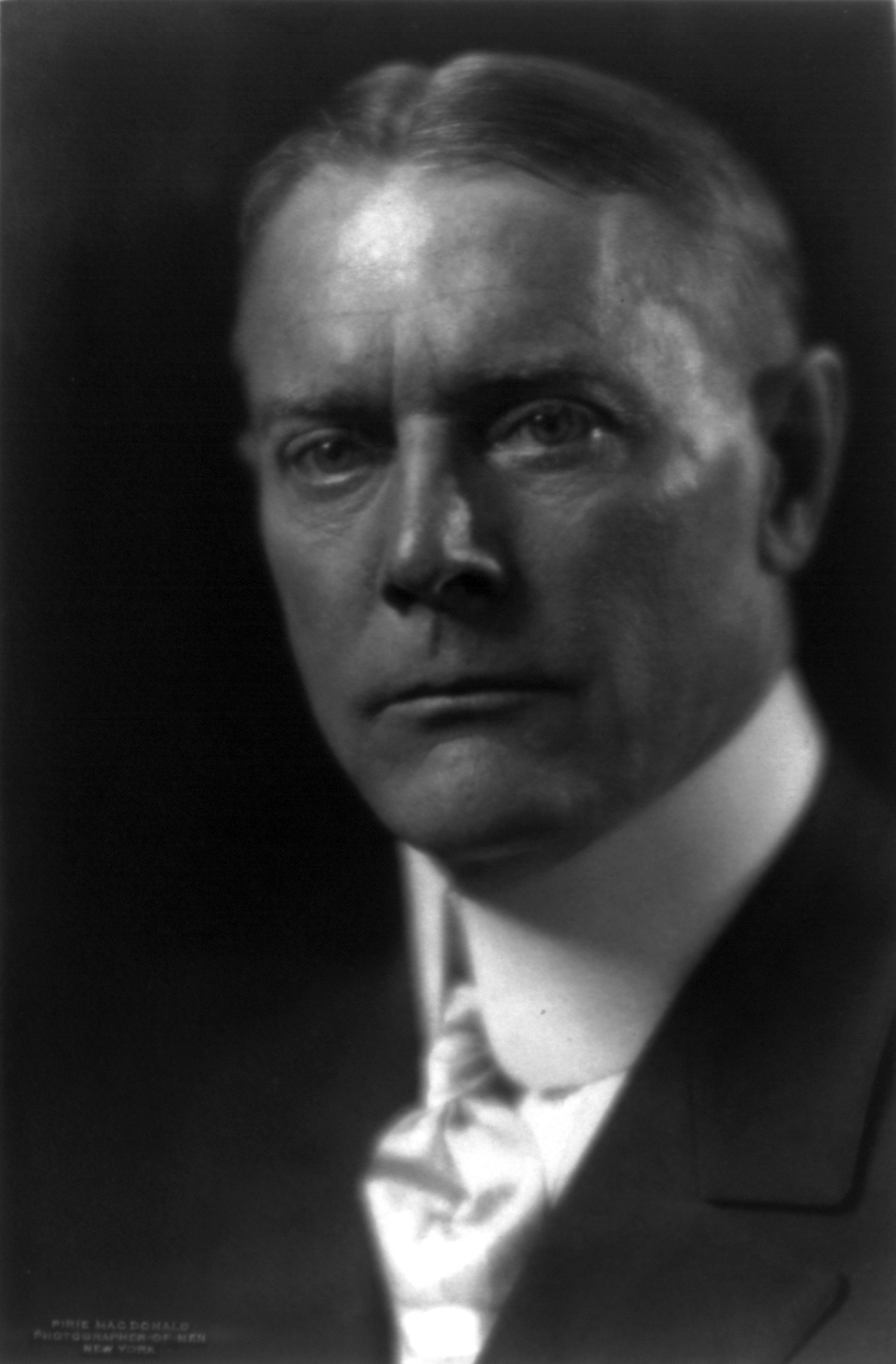
Nominee	Benjamin F. Shively	Hugh Thomas Miller	Albert J. Beveridge
Party	Democratic	Republican	Progressive
Popular vote	272,249	226,766	108,581
Percentage	42.14%	35.10%	16.81%
- County results Shively: 30–40% 40–50% 50–60% 60–70% Miller: 30–40% 40–50% 50–60% Beveridge: 30–40%
U.S. senator before election
Benjamin F. Shively
Democratic
Elected U.S. senator
Benjamin F. Shively
Democratic

The 1914 United States Senate special election in Indiana took place on November 7, 1914. Incumbent Senator Benjamin F. Shively was re-elected to a second term in office over Hugh Thomas Miller and Albert J. Beveridge. This was the first popular election for United States Senator held in Indiana, as required by the Seventeenth Amendment to the United States Constitution. Beveridge only won Wayne county.

== General election ==
=== Candidates ===
- Albert J. Beveridge, former Republican U.S. Senator (Progressive)
- Sumner W. Haynes (Prohibition)
- James Matthews (Socialist Labor)
- Hugh Thomas Miller, director of the Union Trust Company and former Lieutenant Governor (Republican)
- Stephen N. Reynolds (Socialist)
- Benjamin F. Shively, incumbent Senator since 1909 (Democratic)

=== Results ===
1914 U.S. Senate special election in Indiana
Party	Candidate	Votes	%
Democratic	Benjamin F. Shively (incumbent)	272,249	42.14%
Republican	Hugh Thomas Miller	226,766	35.10%
Progressive	Albert Beveridge	108,581	16.81%
Socialist	Stephen N. Reynolds	21,719	3.36%
Prohibition	Sumner W. Haynes	13,860	2.15%
Socialist Labor	James Matthews	2,884	0.45%
Total votes		703,289	100.00%
Democratic hold			

== See also ==
- 1914 United States Senate elections
