= Frederick Van Nuys =

American politician

Frederick R. Van Nuys
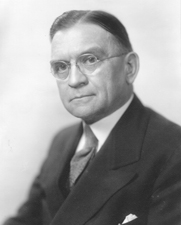

United States Senator from Indiana
- In office March 4, 1933 – January 25, 1944
- Preceded by: James Eli Watson
- Succeeded by: Samuel D. Jackson

Member of the Indiana Senate
- In office 1913–1916

Personal details
- Born: Frederick Rollin Van Nuys; April 16, 1874 Falmouth, Indiana, U.S.
- Died: January 25, 1944 (aged 69) Vienna, Virginia, U.S.
- Party: Democratic
- Spouse: Marie Louise Krug
- Relatives: George Armstrong Custer distant cousin
- Education: Earlham College; Indiana University Robert H. McKinney School of Law

Frederick Rollin Van Nuys (April 16, 1874 – January 25, 1944) was a United States senator from Indiana. Born in Falmouth, he attended the public schools and graduated from Earlham College (Richmond, Indiana) in 1898 and from Indiana Law School (now Indiana University Robert H. McKinney School of Law) in 1900. He was admitted to the bar in 1900 and commenced practice in Shelbyville moving shortly afterward to Anderson. From 1906 to 1910 he was prosecuting attorney of Madison County and was a member of the Indiana Senate from 1913 to 1916, serving as president pro tempore in 1915. He moved to Indianapolis in 1916 and continued the practice of law; he was United States Attorney for the U.S. District of Indiana from 1920 to 1922.

According to an interview in The Literary Digest, he pronounced his last name "van-NIECE".

He was elected as a Democrat to the U.S. Senate in 1932, soundly defeating longtime incumbent and Majority Leader James Eli Watson. He was an opponent of the Eighteenth Amendment and called for changes to the Volstead Act. In 1937, he joined with Senator Robert F. Wagner in introducing an anti-lynching bill in the Senate. The House of Representatives passed a similar numbered bill (HR 1507) by a wide 277–120 margin. The bill failed to achieve even a simple majority on either cloture vote in the Senate in 1938 because of the way the Senate Judiciary committee rewrote the bill.

While in the Senate he was chairman of the Committee on Expenditures in Executive Departments (76th Congress) and a member of the Committee on the Judiciary (77th and 78th Congresses).

Although he was a Democrat who was elected as part of Franklin D. Roosevelt’s sweeping victory, Van Nuys was not always a reliable supporter of New Deal policies and opposed the president’s plan to enlarge the United States Supreme Court. He also stayed outside of the Indiana Democratic Party political machine, opposing the party in patronage matters. His positions led some forces in the Democratic Party, including the AFL–CIO to oppose his renomination in 1938. Loyalists to Governors Paul McNutt and M. Clifford Townsend sought to "eliminate" him from the Senate, which was welcomed by the Roosevelt administration.

After initially threatening to run as an independent, he secured support for the Democratic nomination and faced Republican newspaper publisher Raymond E. Willis in the general election. Van Nuys won the election by a mere 5,100 votes, which led Willis to appeal to the Senate for a recount, alleging election irregularities. The Senate denied the recount on the grounds that the affected votes would not have changed the results.

In 1943 a confidential analysis by Isaiah Berlin of the Senate Foreign Relations Committee for the British Foreign Office stated of Van Nuys:

his voting record is a very mixed one; in 1939 he was one of the members of the committee which voted to postpone consideration of the Neutrality Act in June of that year; in October he voted for a revision but not for repeal. Like George and Gillette, he is one of the Senators whom the 1938 purge failed to eliminate, and his feeling towards the President is, therefore, somewhat cool. He voted for Lend-Lease in common with most Democrats, against reciprocal trade agreements, and occasionally votes with the Farm Bloc. A man of very uncertain views tinged with isolationism and liable, on the whole, to vote with the Conservatives.

He died on January 25, 1944, at his home in Vienna, Virginia, after a short illness and was buried in East Maplewood Cemetery, Anderson, Indiana. Governor Henry Schricker appointed Samuel D. Jackson to succeed him in the Senate.

== See also ==
- List of members of the United States Congress who died in office (1900–1949)

Party political offices
Preceded by Albert Stump	Democratic nominee for U.S. Senator from Indiana (Class 3); 1932, 1938	Succeeded by Cornelius O'Brien
U.S. Senate
Preceded by James Eli Watson	U.S. senator (Class 3) from Indiana; 1933–1944; Served alongside: Arthur Raymond Robinson, Sherman Minton, Raymond E. Willis	Succeeded by Samuel D. Jackson
Political offices
Preceded by Henry F. Ashurst	Chairman of the Senate Judiciary Committee; 1941–1944	Succeeded by Pat McCarran
