= David L. Cornwell =

American politician

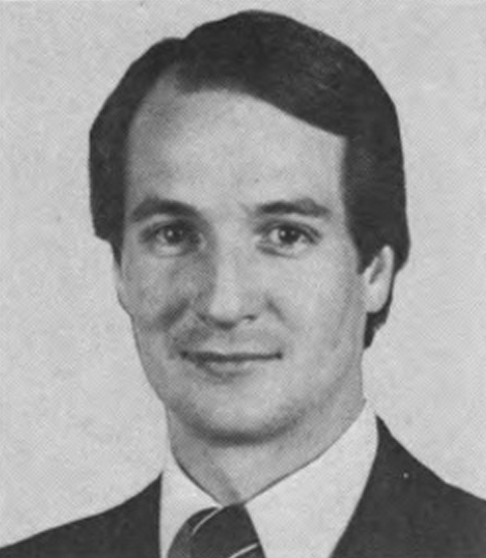

Member of the U.S. House of Representatives from Indiana's 8th district
- In office January 3, 1977 – January 3, 1979
- Preceded by: Philip H. Hayes
- Succeeded by: H. Joel Deckard

Personal details
- Born: David Lance Cornwell; June 14, 1945 Paoli, Indiana
- Died: November 2, 2012 (aged 67) Annapolis, Maryland
- Party: Democratic
- Education: Hillsdale College; American College of Monaco; Indiana University

David Lance Cornwell (June 14, 1945 – November 2, 2012) was an American Vietnam War veteran who served one term as a U.S. representative from Indiana from 1977 to 1979.

== Early life and career ==
Born in Paoli, Indiana, Cornwell attended Paoli public schools, Culver Military Academy in Indiana and later Phillips Andover Academy in Massachusetts. In 1964, Cornwell graduated from Park High School, Indianapolis, Indiana. The same year, he attended Hillsdale College and then American College of Monaco in 1969. Cornwell enrolled at Indiana University in 1974, where he attended for one semester and studied political science.

He also worked as secretary for the Board of Directors of Cornwell Co., Inc. in Paoli.

== Vietnam War ==
In the years 1966 to 1968, he served in the United States Army. He was in the 71st Medical Evacuation Hospital in Vietnam.

== Congress ==
Although an unsuccessful candidate for nomination in 1974 to the Ninety-fourth Congress, Cornwell was narrowly elected as a Democrat to the Ninety-fifth Congress, representing Indiana's 8th congressional district. He served from January 3, 1977, to January 3, 1979, and was an unsuccessful candidate for reelection in 1978.

In Congress, he served on the Committee on Veterans Affairs, where he focused much of his attention on issues related to servicemen and women who had served in the Vietnam War.

== Later career and death ==
After he left Congress, Cornwell worked in the Department of Labor, before entering the private sector as a governmental and international relations consultant, as well as business pursuits.

He was a resident of Annapolis, Maryland at the time of his death from kidney cancer in 2012.

U.S. House of Representatives
Preceded by Philip H. Hayes	United States Representative for the 8th district of Indiana; 1977–1979	Succeeded by H. Joel Deckard
