= 1932 United States Senate election in Indiana =

- November 8, 1932
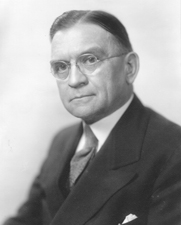

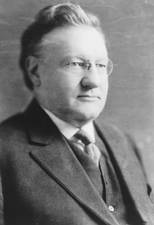
Nominee	Frederick Van Nuys	James E. Watson
Party	Democratic	Republican
Popular vote	870,053	661,750
Percentage	55.57%	42.26%
- County results Van Nuys: 40–50% 50–60% 60–70% 70–80% Watson: 40–50% 50–60%
U.S. senator before election
James E. Watson
Republican
Elected U.S. Senator
Frederick Van Nuys
Democratic

The 1932 United States Senate election in Indiana took place on November 8, 1932. Incumbent Republican Senator and Senate Majority Leader James E. Watson ran for a third term in office, but was defeated by Frederick Van Nuys in a landslide.

This marked the first time in history that a Senate leader lost re-election, and the only time they were a Republican.

== General election ==
=== Candidates ===
- Evartt E. Bailey (Socialist Labor)
- Ralph Green (National)
- William Townsend (Communist)
- Frederick Van Nuys, former U.S. Attorney for the District of Indiana and State Senator (Democratic)
- Forrest Wallace (Socialist)
- James E. Watson, incumbent Senator since 1916 and Senate Majority Leader (Republican)
- Alson E. Wrentmore (Prohibition)

=== Results ===
1932 United States Senate election in Indiana
Party	Candidate	Votes	%	±%
Democratic	Frederick Van Nuys	870,053	55.57%	▲6.62
Republican	James E. Watson (incumbent)	783,189	42.26%	▼7.78
Socialist	Forrest Wallace	18,724	1.20%	▲0.71
Prohibition	Alson E. Wrentmore	9,406	0.60%	▲0.08
Communist	William Townsend	2,123	0.14%	N/A
National	Miles Blansett	1,869	0.12%	N/A
Socialist Labor	Evartt E. Bailey	1,825	0.12%	N/A
Total votes		1,687,189	100.00%	
Democratic gain from Republican		Swing		

== See also ==
- 1932 United States Senate elections
