= 1938 United States Senate election in Indiana =

- November 8, 1938
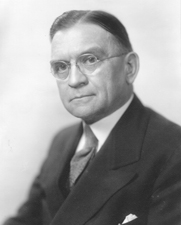

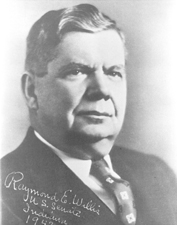
Nominee	Frederick Van Nuys	Raymond E. Willis
Party	Democratic	Republican
Popular vote	788,386	783,189
Percentage	49.85%	49.52%
- County results Van Nuys: 40–50% 50–60% 60–70% Willis: 40–50% 50–60% 60–70%
U.S. senator before election
Frederick Van Nuys
Democratic
Elected U.S. Senator
Frederick Van Nuys
Democratic

The 1938 United States Senate election in Indiana took place on November 8, 1938. Incumbent Democratic Senator Frederick Van Nuys was narrowly re-elected to a second term in office over Raymond E. Willis by a margin of 5,197 votes out of over 1.5 million cast.

== General election ==
=== Candidates ===
- Miles Blansett (Communist)
- Louis E. Roebuck (Socialist)
- Herman L. Seeger (Prohibition)
- Frederick Van Nuys, incumbent Senator since 1933 (Democratic)
- Raymond E. Willis, former State Representative (Republican)

=== Results ===
1938 United States Senate election in Indiana
Party	Candidate	Votes	%	±%
Democratic	Frederick Van Nuys (incumbent)	788,386	49.85%	▼5.72
Republican	Raymond E. Willis	783,189	49.52%	▲7.26
Prohibition	Herman L. Seeger	6,905	0.44%	▼0.16
Socialist	Louis E. Roebuck	2,026	0.13%	▼1.07
Communist	Miles Blansett	984	0.06%	▼0.08
Total votes		1,651,385	100.00%	
Democratic hold		Swing		

== Aftermath ==
On March 13, Willis petitioned the Senate for a review of the election, alleging tampering with tabulation machines and allowing improperly registered persons to vote. Willis also charged that recipients of Works Progress Administration jobs and relief were pressured to vote for the Democrats, and he complained about the infamous Two Per Cent Club, which was said to have violated the corrupt practices acts by collecting and disbursing thousands of dollars for the senatorial election without keeping appropriate records. He made no allegation that Van Nuys was involved or aware of corrupt practices.

After one month's investigation, the Senate Committee on Privileges and Elections returned a report favorable to Van Nuys, and it was carried by a voice vote of the whole Senate.

Willis was elected to Indiana's other Senate seat in 1940. Willis and Van Nuys were Senate colleagues for three years until the latter's death in 1944.

== See also ==
- 1938 United States Senate elections
