= 1952 United States Senate election in Indiana =

- November 4, 1952
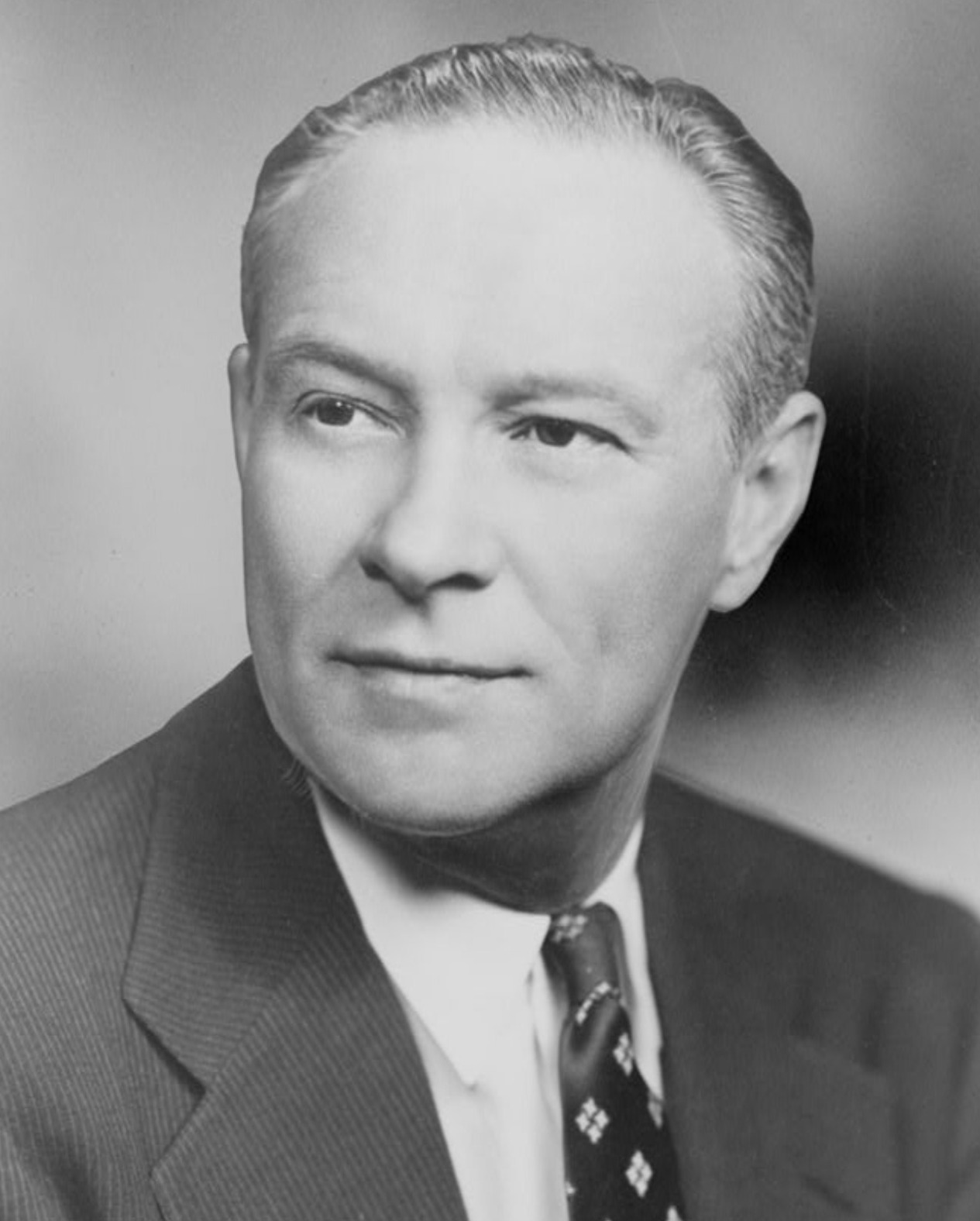

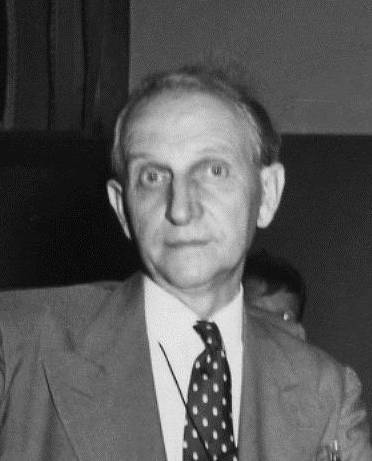
Nominee	William E. Jenner	Henry F. Schricker
Party	Republican	Democratic
Popular vote	1,020,605	911,169
Percentage	52.44%	46.82%
- County results Jenner: 40–50% 50–60% 60–70% 70–80% Schricker: 40–50% 50–60%
U.S. senator before election
William E. Jenner
Republican
Elected U.S. Senator
William E. Jenner
Republican

The 1952 United States Senate election in Indiana took place on November 4, 1952. Incumbent Republican U.S. Senator William E. Jenner was re-elected to a second term in office over Governor of Indiana Henry F. Schricker.

== General election ==
=== Candidates ===
- Carl Leon Eddy (Progressive)
- William E. Jenner, incumbent Senator since 1947 (Republican)
- John Marion Morris (Socialist Labor)
- Henry F. Schricker, Governor of Indiana (Democratic)
- Carl W. Thompson (Prohibition)

=== Results ===
1952 U.S. Senate election in Indiana
Party	Candidate	Votes	%	±%
Republican	William E. Jenner (incumbent)	1,020,605	52.44%	▼2.47
Democratic	Henry F. Schricker	911,169	46.82%	▲3.46
Prohibition	Carl W. Thompson	12,734	0.65%	▼0.91
Progressive	Carl Leon Eddy	891	0.05%	N/A
Socialist Labor	John Marion Morris	719	0.04%	▼0.07
Total votes		1,946,118	100.00%	
Republican hold				

== See also ==
- 1952 United States Senate elections
