= Philip H. Hayes =

American politician (1940–2023)

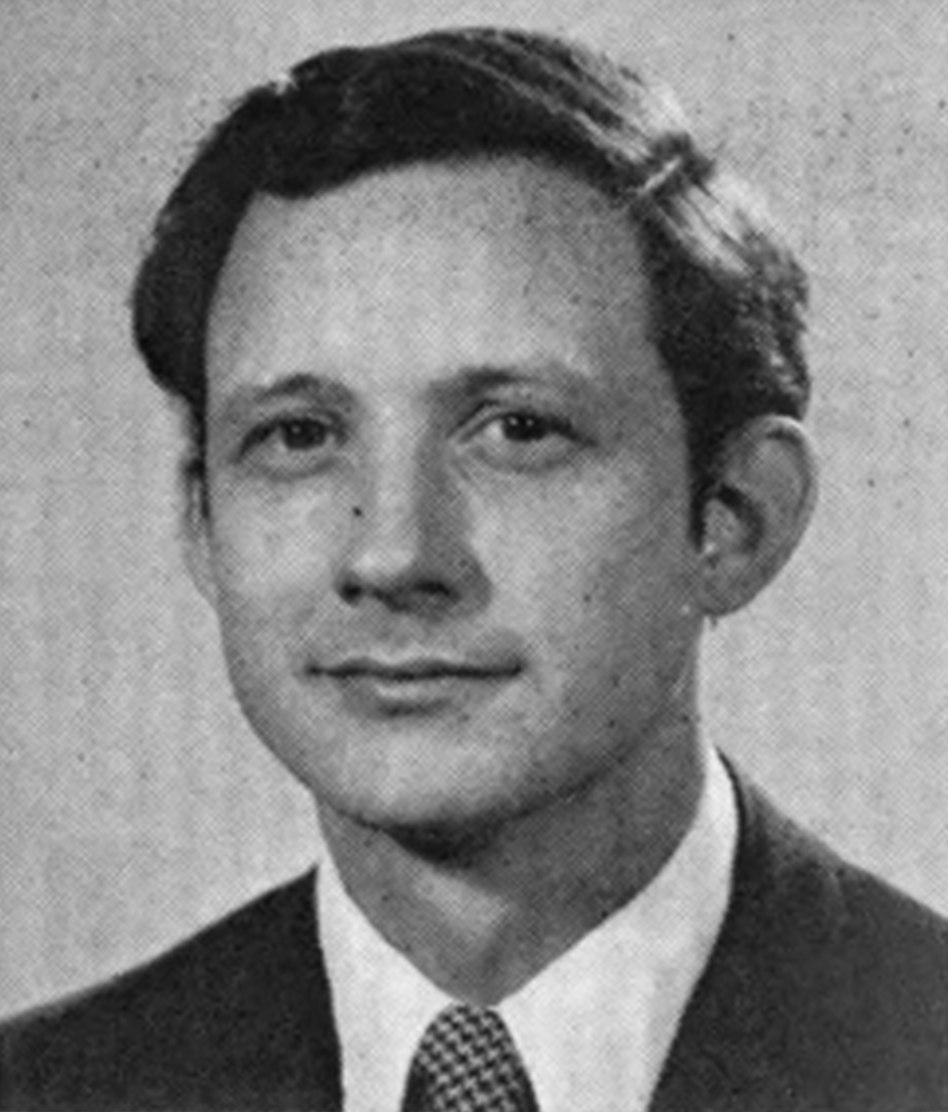

County Attorney of Vanderburgh County, Indiana
- In office 2001–2002

Member of the U.S. House of Representatives from Indiana's 8th district
- In office January 3, 1975 – January 3, 1977
- Preceded by: Roger H. Zion
- Succeeded by: David L. Cornwell

Member of the Indiana Senate
- In office November 4, 1970 – November 6, 1974 Serving with Robert D. Orr (1970–1972)
- Preceded by: Sidney S. Kramer
- Succeeded by: Joseph Franklin O'Day
- Constituency: 26th district (1970–1972); 49th district (1972–1974)

Personal details
- Born: Philip Harold Hayes; September 1, 1940 Battle Creek, Michigan, U.S.
- Died: December 20, 2023 (aged 83) Evansville, Indiana, U.S.
- Party: Democratic
- Education: Indiana University (BA, JD)
- Profession: Attorney

Philip Harold Hayes (September 1, 1940 – December 20, 2023) was an American politician and lawyer from Indiana. He was a U.S. representative, serving in Congress for one term from 1975 to 1977.

== Biography ==
Born in Battle Creek, Michigan, Hayes attended Rensselaer (Indiana) Elementary School. He graduated from Rensselaer High School in 1958, B.A. in political science, Indiana University Bloomington in 1963, and J.D., Indiana University School of Law Indianapolis in 1967. He was admitted to the Indiana bar in 1967 and District of Columbia bar in 1977.

=== Early career ===
He was initially a lawyer in private practice, and then a deputy prosecuting attorney for Vanderburgh County, Indiana from 1967 to 1968. He subsequently served as member of the Indiana State senate from 1971 to 1974.

=== Congress ===
Hayes was elected as a Democrat to the Ninety-fourth Congress (January 3, 1975 – January 3, 1977). He introduced the National Climatic Program Act of 1975, a version of which eventually became law as the National Climate Program Act in 1978.

He was not a candidate for reelection in 1976, but was the unsuccessful primary election challenger to three-term incumbent Vance Hartke for nomination to the United States Senate.

=== Later life and death ===
Hayes was county attorney in Vanderburgh County, Indiana from 2001 to 2002.

Hayes was a resident of Evansville, Indiana.

Hayes died in Evansville on December 20, 2023, at age 83.

Indiana Senate
Preceded by Sidney S. Kramer	Member of the Indiana Senate from the 26th district 1970–1972; Served alongside: Robert D. Orr	Succeeded by Don Larry Park
Preceded by Constituency established	Member of the Indiana Senate from the 49th district 1972–1974	Succeeded by Joseph Franklin O'Day
U.S. House of Representatives
Preceded by Roger H. Zion	Member of the U.S. House of Representatives from Indiana's 8th congressional district 1975–1977	Succeeded by David L. Cornwell
