= 1940 United States Senate election in Indiana =

- November 5, 1940
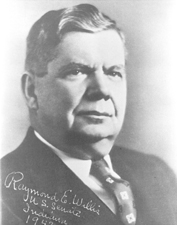

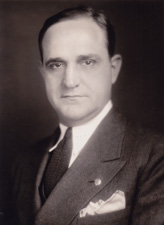
Nominee	Raymond E. Willis	Sherman Minton
Party	Republican	Democratic
Popular vote	888,070	864,803
Percentage	50.45%	49.13%
- County results Willis: 50–60% 60–70% Minton: 40–50% 50–60% 60–70%
U.S. senator before election
Sherman Minton
Democratic
Elected U.S. Senator
Raymond E. Willis
Republican

The 1940 United States Senate election in Indiana took place on November 5, 1940. Incumbent Democratic U.S. Senator Sherman Minton ran for re-election to a second term, but lost narrowly to Republican Raymond E. Willis.

== General election ==
=== Candidates ===
- John H. Kingsbury (Socialist)
- Sherman Minton, incumbent Senator since 1935 (Democratic)
- Carl W. Thompson (Prohibition)
- Raymond E. Willis, former State Representative from Angola and nominee for Senate in 1938 (Republican)

=== Results ===
1940 U.S. Senate election in Indiana
Party	Candidate	Votes	%	±%
Republican	Raymond E. Willis	888,070	50.45%	▲2.97
Democratic	Sherman Minton (incumbent)	864,803	49.13%	▼2.33
Prohibition	Carl W. Thompson	5,621	0.32%	▼0.02
Socialist	John H. Kingsbury	1,751	0.10%	▼0.54
Total votes		1,760,245	100.00%	
Republican gain from Democratic				

== See also ==
- 1940 United States Senate elections
