= John Caven (American politician) =

American politician

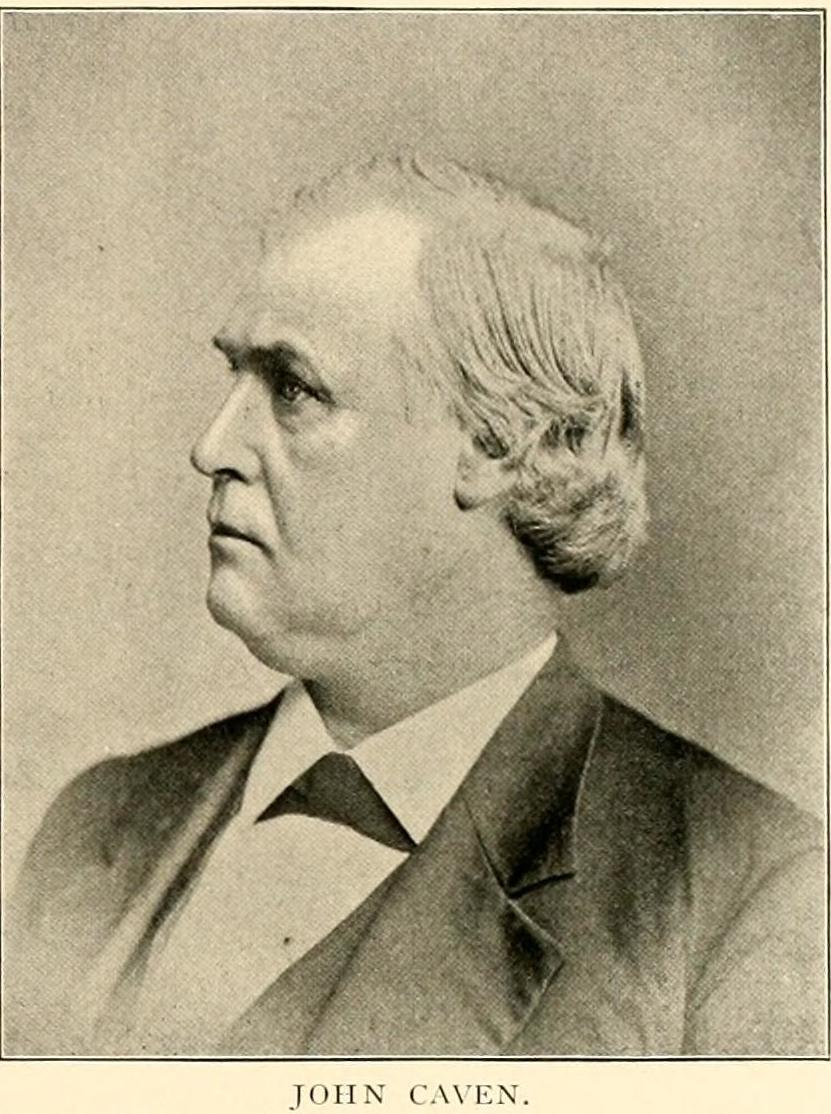
- John Caven in 1899

Member of the Indiana Senate
- In office 1887
- In office 1869–1873

9th and 12th Mayor of Indianapolis
- In office 1875–1881
- Preceded by: James L. Mitchell
- Succeeded by: Daniel W. Grubbs
- In office 1863–1867
- Preceded by: Samuel D. Maxwell
- Succeeded by: Daniel McCauley

Personal details
- Born: April 12, 1824 Allegheny County, Pennsylvania, U.S.
- Died: March 9, 1905 (aged 80) Indianapolis, Indiana, U.S.
- Resting place: Crown Hill Cemetery and Arboretum, Section 13, Lot 46; 39.8192946°N 86.1759682°W
- Party: Republican

John Caven (April 12, 1824 – March 9, 1905) was an Indiana politician and Freemason who served as the 9th and 12th mayor of Indianapolis. He was also a member of the Indiana Senate.

== Early life ==
Caven was born in Allegheny County, Pennsylvania to Scotch-Irish and English American parents.

== Career ==
Caven moved to Indianapolis in 1845, began law studies two years later, and opened a practice. In May 1863, Caven, running as a Republican, was elected mayor without opposition. He won a second term in 1865. Caven then served two terms in the Indiana Senate (1869–1873), representing Marion County before returning to serve another three consecutive terms (1875–1881) as mayor of Indianapolis. He won a third term as a state senator in 1887.

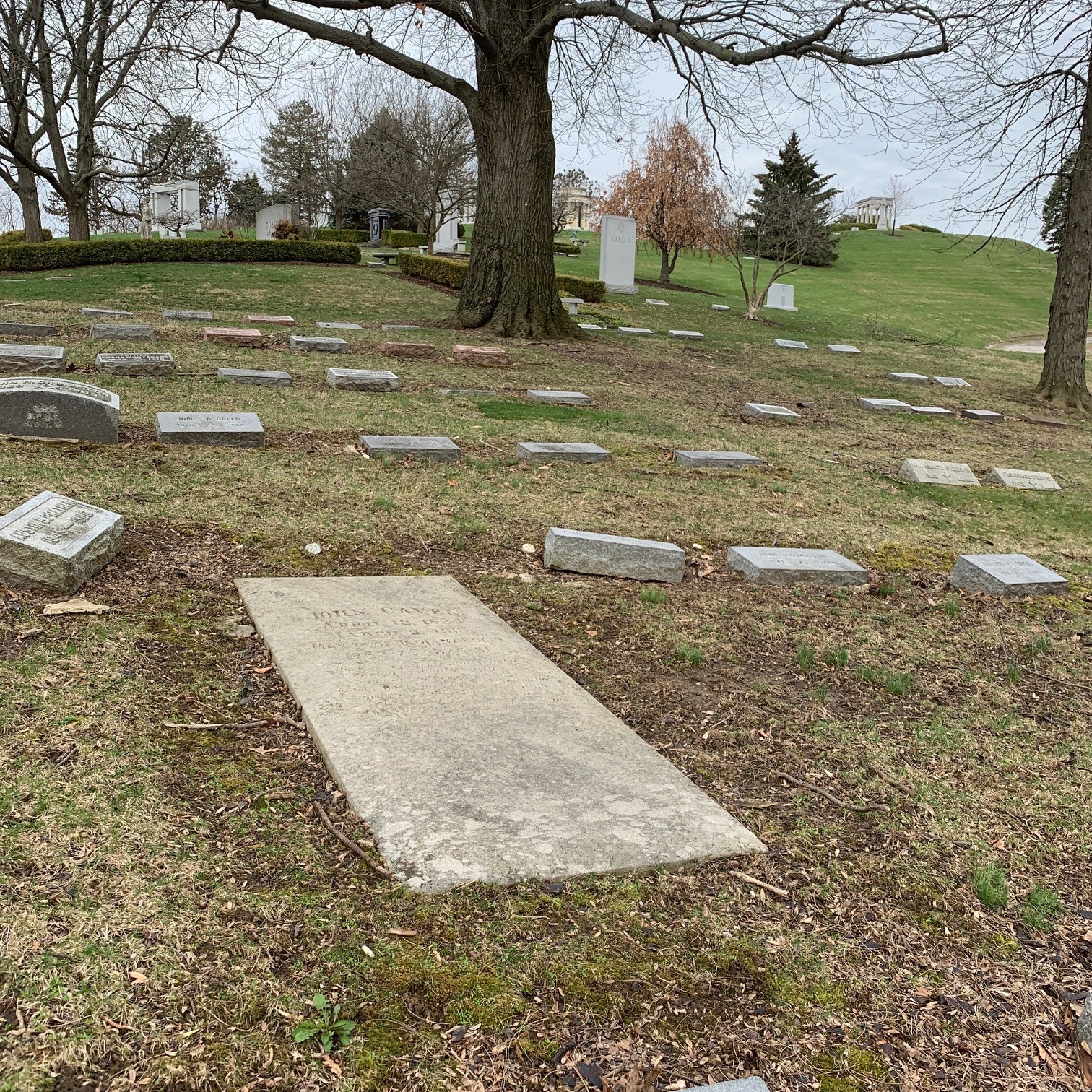
Tombstone for John Caven at Crown Hill Cemetery and Arboretum.
