= David Hervey Maxwell =

American physician and Whig Legislator

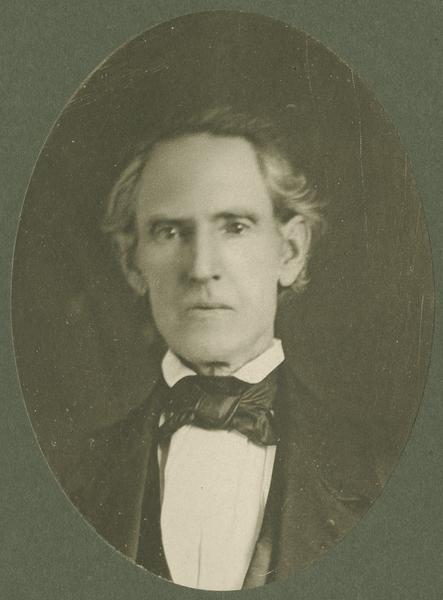
- Born: September 17, 1786; Garrard County, Kentucky
- Died: May 24, 1854 (aged 67)
- Occupations: Physician, legislator
- Known for: Being the "Father of Indiana University" for his work in creating the school.

David Hervey Maxwell (September 17, 1786 – May 24, 1854) was an American medical doctor and Whig legislator. He is known as the "Father of Indiana University" because of his successful efforts in lobbying to have the State Seminary located in Bloomington. Throughout his life he served on the Indiana University Board of Trustees and various political offices.

== Early life and education ==
The son of Bazaleel Maxwell, a Scotch Presbyterian son of Irish immigrants from Albermarle County, Virginia, and Margaret Anderson of Rockbridge County, Virginia. Maxwell was educated at a frontier school supplemented by additional education at home. At the age of 18, he was sent to Danville, Kentucky, to continue his education and study under Ephraim McDowell.

While residing in Danville he married Mary E. Dunn, herself a daughter of an Irish immigrant, on September 12, 1809. The next year he moved to Jefferson County, Indiana, where he would reside and practice medicine until 1819. On April 13, 1813, he was called into service for the War of 1812, where he served as a surgeon with the rank of Private in the Mounted Rangers of his brother-in-law, Captain Williamson Dunn, until being discharged from service on March 1, 1814. During his service he lost his medical instruments due to flooding and was later reimbursed by Congress.

== Career ==
=== Delegate to the 1816 Constitution Convention ===
In 1816, forty-three men from across Indiana were invited to Corydon to consider statehood for Indiana. David Maxwell was sent as delegate to represent Jefferson county. As a delegate he wrote Article IX section 2 of the Indiana State Constitution which established the state's duty to provide a statewide system of education.

=== Move to Bloomington ===
In 1818, David Maxwell purchased a lot of land in present-day Bloomington when it was first platted. The following year in May 1819 he moved to a log cabin on the lot. There on September 25, 1819, the First Presbyterian Church was founded when nine people gathered in Maxwell's home to meet with Isaac Reed, a Presbyterian missionary.

=== Early political career and the creation of the Indiana State Seminary ===
David Harvey Maxwell served numerous terms in the Indiana General Assembly. First in the 4th general Assembly starting December 6, 1819, when he joined the Assembly and pushed for the creation of the state seminary, the precursor to Indiana University. On January 20, 1820, "An Act to Establish a State Seminary and for Other Purposes" was approved and established a six-man board of Trustees to meet in June 1820 to decide upon a location for the seminary within Perry Township. David Harvey was appointed to and elected President of the board. He would go on to serve as on the Indiana University Board of Trustees from 1820 until 1837 and again from 1839 until 1852.

David Maxwell returned to the 6th, 8th, and 9th Sessions of the General Assembly. He served as the Speaker of the Indiana House of Representatives during the 8th Assembly. As a Representative he served on the Ways & Means Committee and the Committee on Education. From 1826 until 1829 he represented the counties of Monroe, Greene, and Owen in the Indiana Senate. There he once more served on the Ways & Means Committee and became Chair of the Committee on Education.

=== Late political career and the creation of Indiana College ===
On January 24, 1828, legislation was passed to change the Indiana State Seminary into Indiana College bringing it one step closer to the Indiana University of today. During the 1836 legislative session, Indiana Governor Noah Noble appointed David Maxwell to the State Board of Internal Improvements where Maxwell was elected president. Following the Panic of 1837 and subsequent collapse of the project, Maxwell moved on. In 1841 President Tyler, a Whig politician, appointed Maxwell a fellow Whig to be the Postmaster of Bloomington where Maxwell served from May 31, 1841, until December 30, 1845. He was superseded as Postmaster by John Berry who had been appointed by President Polk, a Democrat. Maxwell would then serve as Mayor of Bloomington in 1848.

President Zachary Taylor reappointed David Maxwell as a postmaster restoring Whig control. Maxwell once more served as Postmaster from 1849 until 1852.

== Personal life ==
Maxwell married Mary E. Dunn of Danville, Kentucky, on September 21, 1809. She was the daughter of Samuel Dunn an Irish-American immigrant from County Down, Ireland. Together they had 10 children, including Dr. James Darwin Maxwell (b. 1815). Dr. James Darwin Maxwell was one of the youngest people to ever attend Indiana University gaining admission at the age of eight.

David Maxwell is the uncle of the 8th Mayor of Indianapolis Samuel D Maxwell.

== Death and legacy ==
David Maxwell died on May 24, 1854. His final words were said to have been "Lord, now lettest thou thy servant depart in peace." The beginning of the Nunc Dimittis.

Maxwell's legacy lives on through Indiana University. In 1889, the Dean of the IU School of Law described Maxwell in his writings chronicling the history of Indiana University: "So unremitting was he in his labors in its behalf, and to such good purpose were they directed, that it can better be said of him than of any other, 'He was the Father of the Indiana University.'"

In 1890, Maxwell Hall, then Library Hall, was built on the IU Bloomington campus having been designed by Architect George Buntig to reflect the Romanesque Revival style. It was renamed in 1894 to honor David Maxwell. Initially serving as a library, today the building houses the Gayle Karch Cook Center for Public Arts and Humanities. The center is named in honor of Gayle Karch Cook. A graduate of IU with a B.A. in fine arts and a later honorary Doctor of Humane Letters. In 2015, Cook was recognized with the College of Arts and Sciences Distinguished Alumni Award.

== See also ==
- List of speakers of the Indiana House of Representatives
