= List of mayors of Indianapolis =

Mayor of the City of Indianapolis
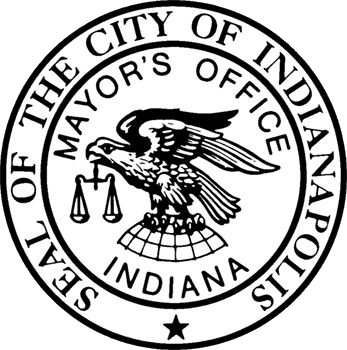
- Seal of the Office of the Mayor of the City of Indianapolis

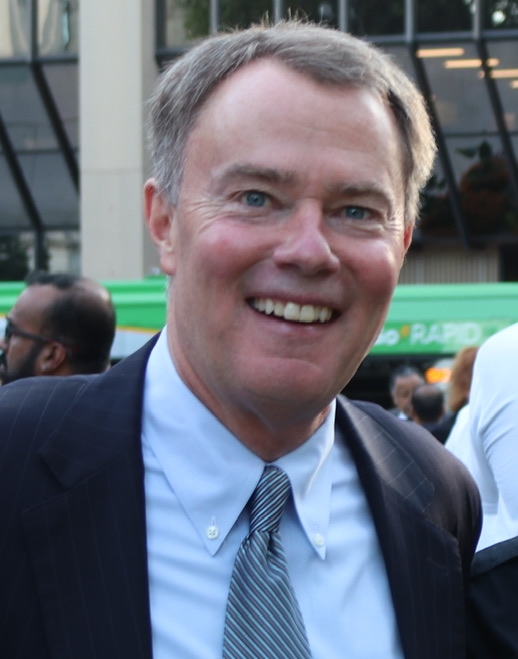
- Incumbent; Joe Hogsett since January 1, 2016
- Term length: Four years
- Inaugural holder: Samuel Henderson
- Formation: 1847
- Salary: $95,317.60 annually
- Website: Office of the Mayor

The mayor of Indianapolis is the head of the executive branch of the consolidated city-county government of Indianapolis and Marion County. As the chief executive, the mayor has the duty to oversee city-county government's various departments, agencies, and municipal corporations. They also have the power to either approve or veto bills passed by the Indianapolis City-County Council, the legislative branch. The mayor serves a four-year term and has no limit to the number of terms they may serve.

As of 2014, the mayor was paid an annual salary of $95,317.60. The Mayor's Office is on the twenty-fifth floor of the City-County Building.

== Elections ==
The mayor of Indianapolis is elected every four years; elections take place one year before United States presidential elections on election day in November. The mayor is usually sworn in at noon on January 1 following the election. The next election for the mayor will be in 2027.

Indianapolis city elections are partisan, with party affiliations listed alongside candidates' names on the ballot. Primary elections are held on the first Tuesday of May in a mayoral election year. Candidates for mayor secure their party's nominations to campaign in the general election, held on Election Day the following November.

== Lists ==
To date, 43 individuals have served as mayor. There have been 49 mayoralties due to six individuals who served nonconsecutive terms. John Caven, Caleb S. Denny, Charles A. Bookwalter, Samuel L. Shank, Reginald H. Sullivan, and Philip L. Bayt served two nonconsecutive terms each. The longest term was that of William "Bill" Hudnut, who served four consecutive terms for 16 years. The shortest term was that of Claude E. Negley, who served 13 days.

=== Pre-Unigov ===
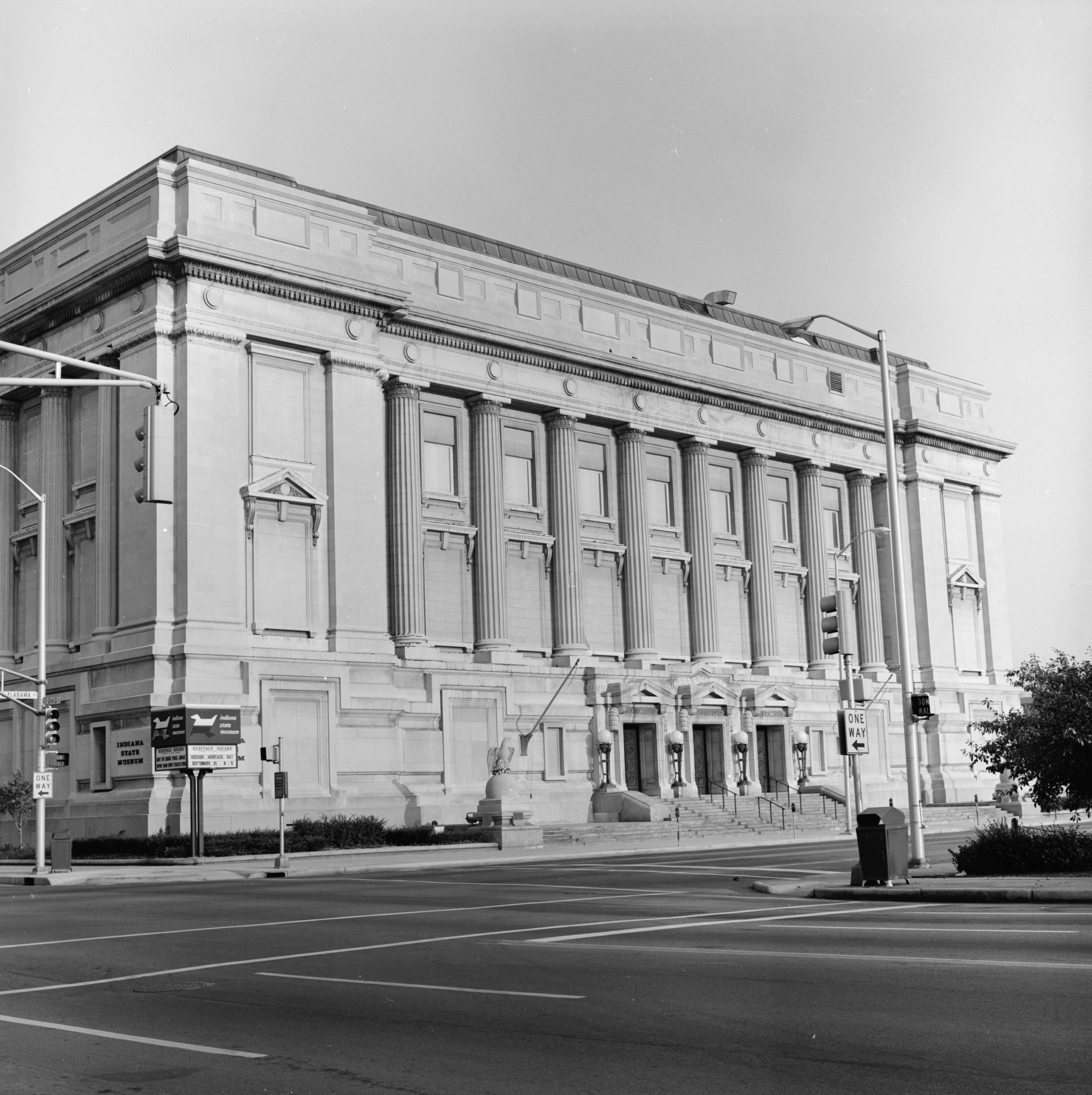
Old Indianapolis City Hall housed the Mayor's Office from 1910 until completion of the City-County Building in 1962.

No.	Image	Name	Term start	Term end	Party
1		Samuel Henderson (1800–1883; aged 83)	May 1, 1847	1849	Whig
2		Horatio C. Newcomb (1821–1882; aged 61)	1849	November 7, 1851	Whig
3		Caleb Scudder (1795–1866; aged 71)	November 1851	1854	Whig
4		James McCready (1816–1909; aged 93)	1854	1856	Democratic
5		Henry F. West (1796–1856; aged 60)	1856	November 8, 1856	Democratic
6		Charles G. Coulon (1825–1881; aged 56)	November 8, 1856	November 22, 1856	Democratic
7		William J. Wallace (1814–1894; aged 80)	1856	May 5, 1858	Republican
8		Samuel D. Maxwell (1803–1873; aged 70)	May 5, 1858	January 1, 1863	Republican
9		John Caven (1st) (1824–1905; aged 81)	1863	1867	Republican
10		Daniel McCauley (1839–1894; aged 55)	1867	1873	Republican
11		James L. Mitchell (1834–1894; aged 60)	1873	1875	Democratic
12		John Caven (2nd)	1875	1881	Republican
13		Daniel W. Grubbs (1835–1917; aged 82)	May 12, 1881	January 1, 1884	Republican
14		John L. McMaster (1843–1914; aged 71)	January 1, 1884	January 1, 1886	Republican
15		Caleb S. Denny (1st) (1850–1926; aged 76)	January 1, 1886	January 1, 1890	Republican
16		Thomas L. Sullivan (1846–1936; aged 90)	1890	1893	Democratic
17		Caleb S. Denny (2nd)	October 12, 1893	October 10, 1895	Republican
18		Thomas Taggart (1856–1929; aged 73)	January 1, 1895	December 31, 1901	Democratic
19		Charles A. Bookwalter (1st) (1860–1926; aged 66)	1901	November 1903	Republican
20		John W. Holtzman (1858–1942; aged 84)	November 1903	1906	Democratic
21		Charles A. Bookwalter (2nd)	1906	1910	Republican
22		Samuel L. Shank (1st) (1872–1927; aged 55)	1910	November 28, 1913	Republican
23		Henry R. Wallace (1869–1915; aged 46)	November 28, 1913	January 5, 1914	Republican
24		Joseph E. Bell (1865–1923; aged 58)	1914	1918	Democratic
25		Charles W. Jewett (1884–1961; aged 77)	1918	1922	Republican
26		Samuel L. Shank (2nd)	1922	1926	Republican
27		John L. Duvall (1874–1962; aged 88)	January 4, 1926	October 27, 1927	Republican
28		Claude E. Negley (1873–1943; aged 70)	October 27, 1927	November 9, 1927	Republican
29		Lemuel Ertus Slack (1874–1952; aged 78)	November 9, 1927	1930	Democratic
30		Reginald H. Sullivan (1st) (1876–1980; aged 103)	1930	1935	Democratic
31		John W. Kern (1900–1971; aged 71)	1935	September 2, 1937	Democratic
32		Walter C. Boetcher (1881–1951; aged 70)	1937	1939	Democratic
33		Reginald H. Sullivan (2nd)	1939	1943	Democratic
34		Robert Tyndall (1877–1947; aged 70)	1943	July 9, 1947	Republican
35		George L. Denny (1878–1958; aged 80)	July 9, 1947	January 1, 1948	Republican
36		Albert G. Feeney (1892–1950; aged 58)	January 1, 1948	November 12, 1950	Democratic
37		Philip L. Bayt (1st) (1910–1989; aged 79)	November 12, 1950	November 24, 1951	Democratic
38		Christian J. Emhardt (1883–1971; aged 88)	November 24, 1951	January 1, 1952	Democratic
39		Alex M. Clark (1916–1991; aged 75)	January 1, 1952	January 1, 1956	Republican
40		Philip L. Bayt (2nd)	January 1, 1956	January 1, 1960	Democratic
41		Charles H. Boswell (1909–2006; aged 97)	January 1, 1960	August 6, 1962	Democratic
42		Albert H. Losche (1891–1966; aged 75)	August 6, 1962	January 1, 1964	Democratic
43		John J. Barton (1906–2004; aged 98)	January 1, 1964	January 1, 1968	Democratic

=== Unigov ===
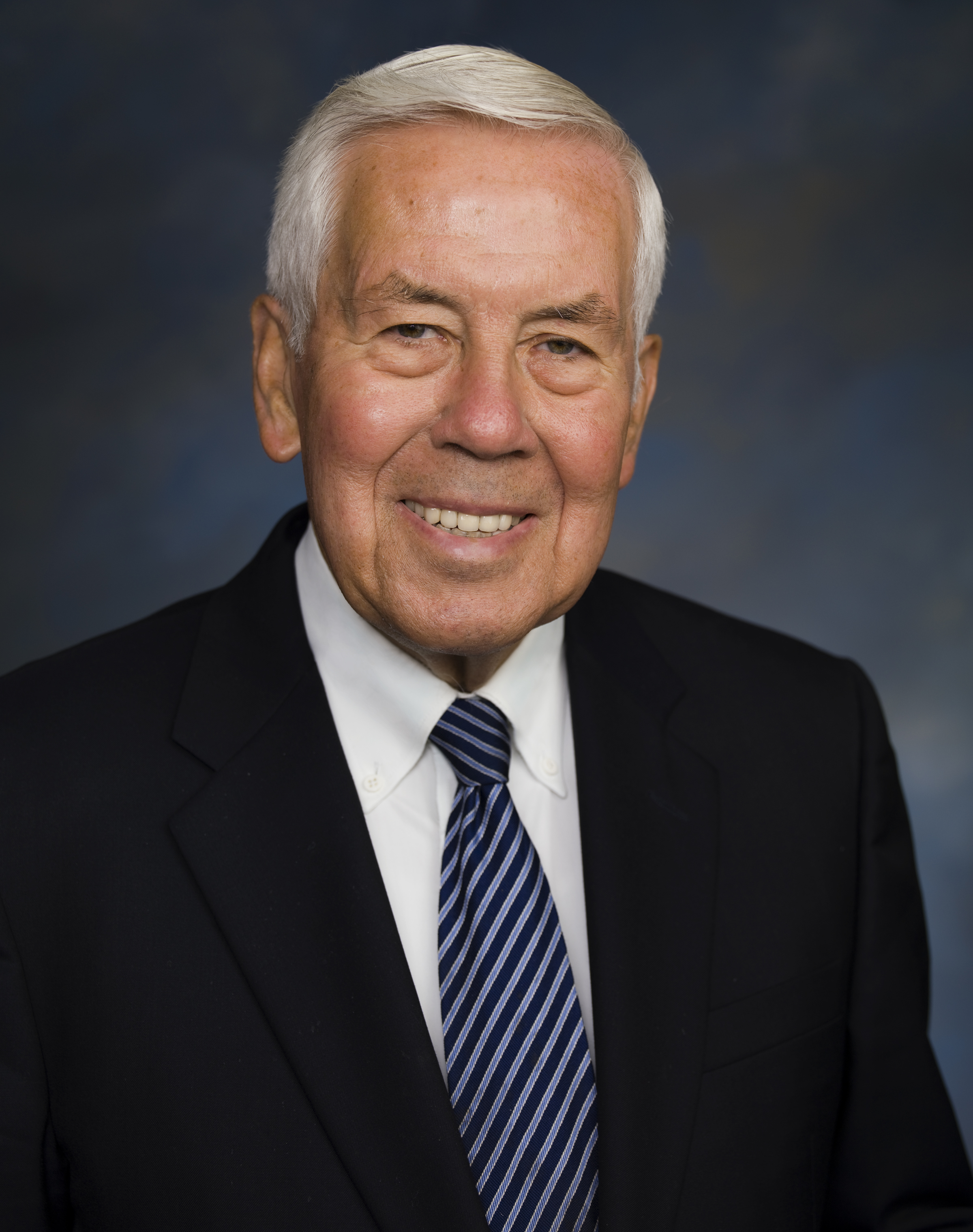
Richard Lugar was the 44th mayor of Indianapolis, and the first under Unigov.

Unigov, the city-county consolidation of Indianapolis and Marion County governments, was enacted on January 1, 1970, exactly two years into Richard Lugar's first term as mayor. The new governance structure, codified in Indiana Code, mandates that the Mayor of Indianapolis is the chief executive of both the city and Marion County. Due to this structure, all Marion County residents are permitted to vote for the Mayor of Indianapolis, regardless if they live within the city or an excluded city or town. For example, residents of Beech Grove, which is an entirely independent municipality in Marion County, have the ability to vote for the Mayor of Indianapolis as well as their own mayor.

No.	Image	Name	Term start	Term end	Party
44		Richard Lugar (1932–2019; aged 87)	January 1, 1968	January 1, 1976	Republican
45		William H. Hudnut (1932–2016; aged 84)	January 1, 1976	January 1, 1992	Republican
46		Stephen Goldsmith (born in 1946; age 79)	January 1, 1992	January 1, 2000	Republican
47		Bart Peterson (born in 1958; age 68)	January 1, 2000	January 1, 2008	Democratic
48		Greg Ballard (born in 1954; age 71)	January 1, 2008	January 1, 2016	Republican
49		Joe Hogsett (born in 1956; age 69)	January 1, 2016	incumbent	Democratic

== See also ==
- Government of Indianapolis
- Timeline of Indianapolis
