= Charles Jewett =

Charles Jewett may refer to:

- Charles Coffin Jewett (1816–1868), librarian
- Charles W. Jewett (Connecticut politician) (1913–2000), Lieutenant Governor of Connecticut
- Charles W. Jewett (Indiana politician) (1884–1961), Mayor of Indianapolis
