= William J. Wallace (Indianapolis mayor) =

American politician

7th Mayor of Indianapolis
- In office 1856 – May 5, 1858
- Preceded by: Charles G. Coulon
- Succeeded by: Samuel D. Maxwell

Personal details
- Born: William John Wallace; March 1814 County Donegal, Ireland
- Died: January 9, 1894 (aged 79) Indianapolis, Indiana, US
- Party: Republican

William John Wallace (1814–1894) was an Irish-American politician. He was the seventh mayor of the city of Indianapolis, Indiana, and the first Republican to hold that office.

== Biography ==
William J. Wallace was born in County Donegal, Ireland in March 1814.

He won a special election in 1856 following the death of mayor Henry F. West and the short interim of Charles G. Coulon. Wallace resigned his post in May 1858.

He died at his home in Indianapolis on January 9, 1894.

His son Henry R. Wallace was also mayor (1913–1914).
