= Walter C. Boetcher =

American politician

Walther C. Boetcher

32nd Mayor of Indianapolis
- In office 1937–1939
- Preceded by: John W. Kern Jr.
- Succeeded by: Reginald H. Sullivan

Personal details
- Born: November 13, 1881
- Died: October 5, 1951 (aged 69)
- Resting place: Crown Hill National Cemetery, Indianapolis, Indiana, Section 98, Lot 245
- Party: Democratic

Walter C. Boetcher (November 13, 1881 – October 5, 1951) was an American politician who served as the 32nd mayor of the city of Indianapolis, Indiana. He served as mayor from 1937 to 1939 after John W. Kern Jr. resigned. He was a member of the Democratic Party. Boetcher is buried at Crown Hill Cemetery in Indianapolis.

Political offices
Preceded by John W. Kern, Jr.	Mayor of Indianapolis; 1937–1939	Succeeded by Reginald H. Sullivan (second term)
