= Samuel Henderson (Indianapolis mayor) =

American politician

1st Mayor of Indianapolis
- In office May 1, 1847 – 1849
- Preceded by: Position established
- Succeeded by: Horatio C. Newcomb

Personal details
- Born: c. 1800 Kentucky
- Died: 1883 (aged 82–83) California
- Party: Whig

Samuel Henderson (c.1800 –1883) was the first mayor of Indianapolis, Indiana. The first mayoral election was held on April 24, 1847, and Henderson, a member of the Whig Party, took office on May 1. He served a two-year term.

== Biography ==
Henderson was a native of Kentucky and was one of the first settlers of Indianapolis. He was appointed the post master from March 1822 to February 1831. By 1835 he was one of the wealthiest people in the town, owning not only a 160-acre (65 ha) farm, but also lots within the Mile Square and elsewhere in the state.

When Indianapolis was incorporated as a town in 1832, he was chosen to serve as the first president of the town board of trustees, serving for one year. He became one of the eight directors of the first bank in Indianapolis opened in 1834. The directors arranged large loans to themselves, leaving Henderson and the others in a precarious financial position during the Panic of 1837.

The advent of the railroads in Indiana prompted the town to obtain a city charter from the Indiana legislature in 1847. Henderson was elected as the mayor on April 24, 1847, for a two-year term. However, he became convinced that Indianapolis would become merely a way station on the railroad lines, and after his term as mayor, he sold his real estate holdings at reduced prices and headed for California to join the Gold Rush. He died there in 1883.

Political offices
Preceded by Position created	Mayor of Indianapolis; 1847–1849	Succeeded by Horatio C. Newcomb
