= Daniel McCauley =

American politician

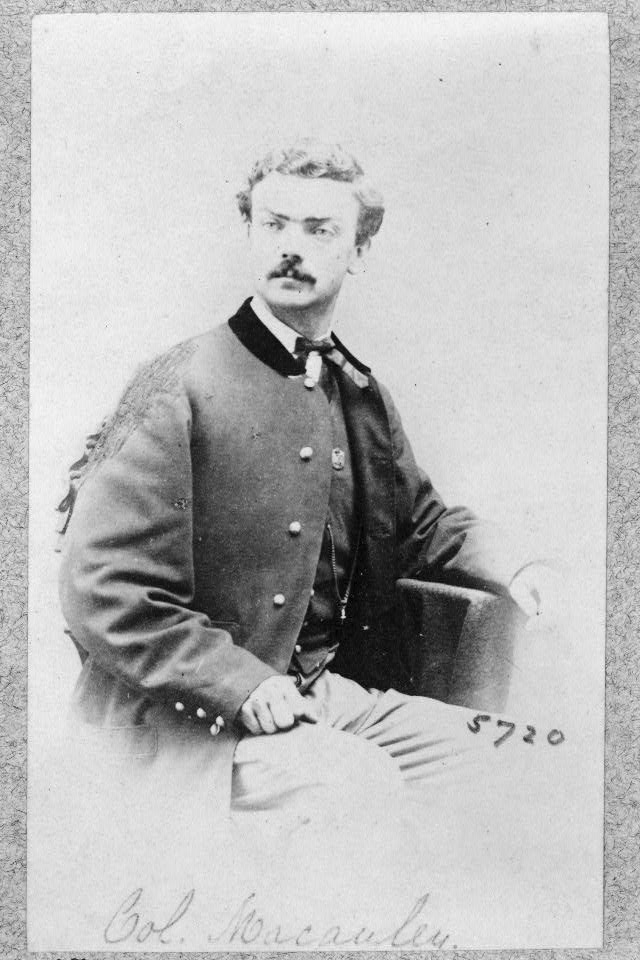
- Portrait of Colonel Daniel Macauley of the 11th Indiana Volunteer Infantry Regiment, taken sometime in 1862-1865

10th Mayor of Indianapolis
- In office 1867–1873
- Preceded by: John Caven
- Succeeded by: James L. Mitchell

Military service
- Allegiance: Union Army
- Branch/service: United States Army
- Years of service: 1861-1865
- Rank: Colonel
- Unit: 11th Indiana Infantry Regiment
- Commands: Company E, 11th Indiana Infantry Regiment
- Battles/wars: American Civil War

Daniel McCauley (1839–1894) was an American politician and Union Army office during the American Civil War.

Born in New York in September 1839, Daniel Macauley (sometimes misspelled as McCauley) immigrated to Indianapolis, Indiana sometime prior to 1861. Macauley enlisted in the 11th Indiana Infantry Regiment on 22 April 1861 as a 2nd Lieutenant in Company E. He was quickly advanced to the position of regimental Adjutant and part of the staff of Colonel Lew Wallace. After service in Virginia, the 11th Indiana returned home to Indiana and mustered out in August 1861.

Macauley was proffered a commission as the Adjutant of the reorganized 11th Indiana, which he accepted on 31 August 1861. He was quickly promoted as the regimental major on 21 April 1862 in the aftermath of Shiloh. During the summer of 1862, the regiment participated in operations in Arkansas and Mississippi, during which time Macauley was promoted to lieutenant colonel on 4 September 1862. Lieutenant Colonel Macauley took command of the 11th Indiana on 29 November 1862, and was subsequently promoted to colonel on 10 March 1863.

Soon thereafter, Macauley led the 11th during Union operations to take Vicksburg. In the first battle of the campaign, Macauley led his men in capturing a Rebel battery at Port Gibson. On 19 May 1863, the regiment was heavily engaged at Champion Hill, with Colonel Macauley among the 167 casualties suffered during the battle.

After recovering from his injuries, Colonel Macauley rejoined his regiment in conducting operations through Louisiana, which lasted until January 1864. After a veteran's furlough, the 11th Indiana returned to New Orleans until July 1864, after which it was redeployed to Virginia. During the Valley Campaigns of 1864 in the Shenandoah Valley, the regiment fought several skirmishes and in all the major battles of the campaign.

While commanding the 3rd Brigade, 2nd Division of the XIX Army Corps, Colonel Macauley fell grievously wounded during the battle of Cedar Creek in October 1864. The severity of his wounds precluded field service, so Macauley was detailed as the Colonel of the 9th Regiment of the Veteran's Reserve Corps, then garrisoning Baltimore. On 11 July 1865, Macauley was awarded a brevet for Brigadier General backdated to 19 October 1864, the date of his wounding at Cedar Creek.

Soon thereafter on 26 July 1865, Brigadier General Macauley was mustered out and returned home to Indianapolis.

He entered politics and was elected the 10th mayor of Indianapolis in 1867, where he served until 1873.

General Macauley died in 1894 and was interred at Arlington National Cemetery.
