= John W. Kern Jr. =

American politician

31st Mayor of Indianapolis

Personal details
- Died: January 29, 1971; Washington Hospital Center
- Resting place: Crown Hill Cemetery and Arboretum, Section 104, Lot 237; 39.8190314°N 86.1683246°W

John Worth Kern Jr. (July 7, 1900 – January 29, 1971) was an American politician who served as the 31st mayor of the city of Indianapolis, Indiana.

== Biography ==
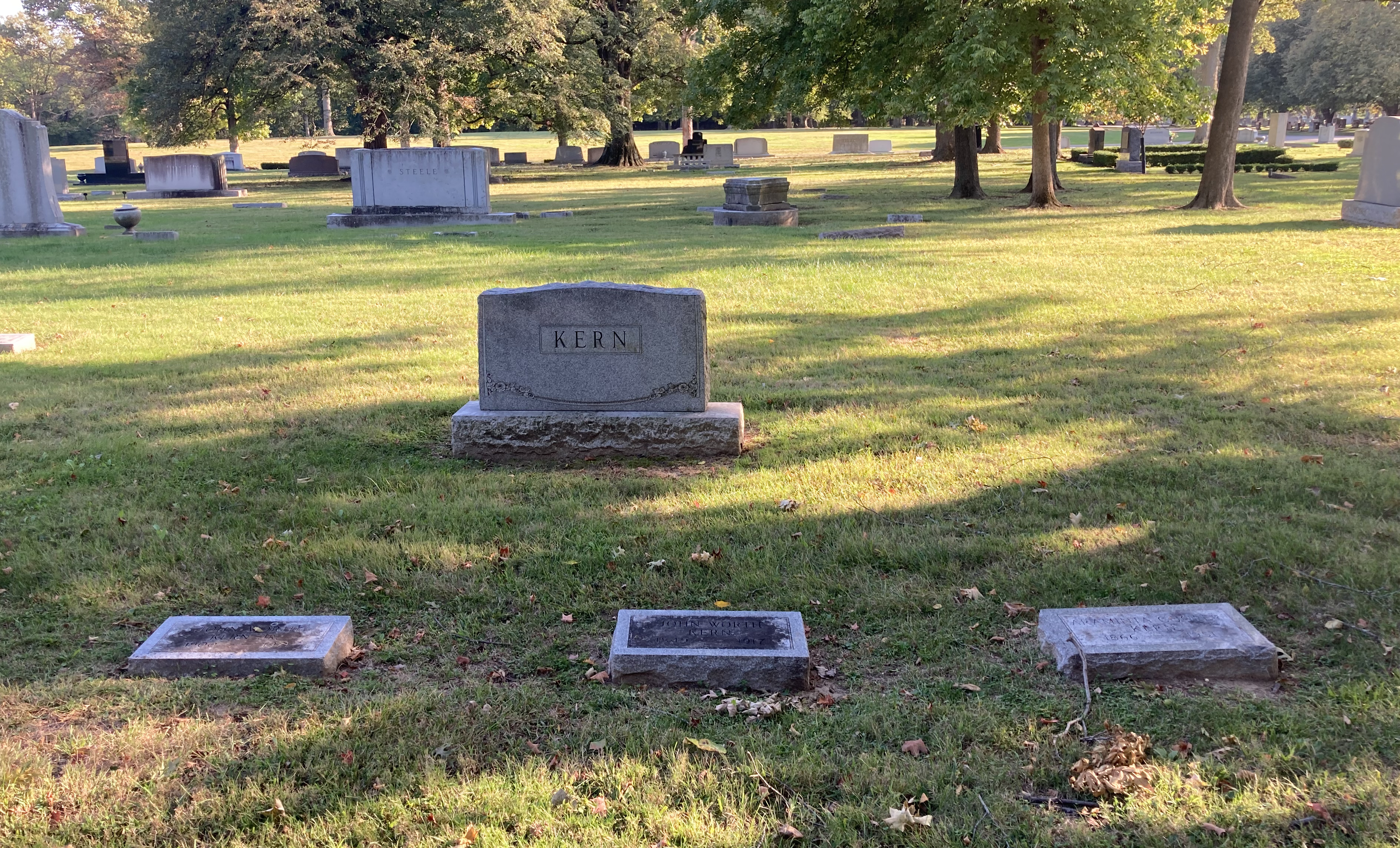
Kern's grave at Crown Hill Cemetery

Kern graduated from Washington and Lee University in 1920 and Harvard Law School in 1923. Prior to serving as mayor, Kern was a judge on the Superior Court of Marion County. He took office as mayor in 1935 and resigned on September 2, 1937, when President Franklin D. Roosevelt appointed him to a seat on the U.S. Board of Tax Appeals, which later became the United States Tax Court. Kern was reappointed by President Truman in 1950 when his first term expired and served as chief judge before retiring from active service on June 30, 1961.

He died at Washington Hospital Center on January 29, 1971, and was buried at Crown Hill Cemetery in Indianapolis.

Kern's father was Senator John W. Kern, the first Senate Majority Leader, and his son was John W. Kern III, a judge of the District of Columbia Court of Appeals. His grandson, John W. Kern IV, is also a lawyer.

Political offices
Preceded by Reginald H. Sullivan	Mayor of Indianapolis; 1935–1937	Succeeded by Walter C. Boetcher
