= Senator Newcomb =

Senator Newcomb may refer to:

- Horatio C. Newcomb (1821–1882), Indiana State Senate
- Josiah T. Newcomb (1868–1944), New York State Senate
