= Mayor West (disambiguation) =

Mayor West commonly refers to Adam West, a character in the American animated sitcom Family Guy.

Mayor West may also refer to:

== Characters ==
- Wild Wild West, Mayor Adam West's cousin and the new mayor of Quahog in season 19 the American animated television series Family Guy voiced by Sam Elliott

== People ==
- Henry F. West (1796–1856), former mayor of Indianapolis
- Ben West (1911–1974), former mayor of Nashville
- James E. West (politician) (1951–2006), former mayor of Spokane
- Jason West (born 1977), former mayor of the village of New Paltz
