= Judge Kern =

Judge Kern may refer to:

- John W. Kern Jr. (1900–1971), judge of the Superior Court of Marion County, Indiana, and of the United States Board of Tax Appeals
- John W. Kern III (c. 1928–2018), judge of the District of Columbia Court of Appeals
- Terence C. Kern (born 1944), judge of the United States District Court for the Northern District of Oklahoma
