= Samuel D. Maxwell =

American politician

8th Mayor of Indianapolis
- In office May 5, 1858 – January 1, 1863
- Preceded by: William J. Wallace
- Succeeded by: John Caven

Personal details
- Born: February 19, 1803 Garrard County, Kentucky
- Died: July 3, 1873 (aged 70) Indianapolis, Indiana
- Resting place: Crown Hill Cemetery and Arborteum Sec 8, Lot 28
- Party: Republican
- Occupation: lawyer, politician

Samuel Dunn Maxwell (February 19, 1803 – July 3, 1873) was an attorney and the eighth mayor of the city of Indianapolis, Indiana. Under his administration and guidance, Indianapolis Fire Department became a professional force.

== Early and family life ==
Maxwell was born in Garrard County, Kentucky, to John Maxwell (1775–1824) and Sarah Dunn Maxwell (1786–1819). His grandfather, Bezaleel Maxwell (1751–1828), of Albemarle County, Virginia, had served as a patriot in the American Revolutionary War, and later moved to Jefferson County, Indiana, with his eldest son, Samuel, and John.

Maxwell's mother died and was buried in Hanover in Jefferson County, Indiana, in 1819. His father, a lawyer, took him to Bloomington, the county seat of Monroe County, Indiana. His uncle David Hervey Maxwell had been one of Bloomington's delegates to the Indiana Constitutional Convention as the territory became a state, and later served in the Indiana state legislature and as mayor of Bloomington. Maxwell married Sarah Maxwell and their children who survived childhood included sons John (b. 1825) and Williamson (1842–1884) and daughters Martha (b. 1838) and Emma (b. 1847).

== Career ==
Possibly after reading law under his father (who died in 1824), Maxwell was admitted to the Indiana bar and by 1829 had moved his family to Frankfort, the seat of Clinton County, Indiana. Like his father, he practiced law, married, and raised a family. The 1850 census lists him as a lawyer with $13,000 in property and his eldest son John (aged 25) as a farmer. By 1858, his wife and youngest son had died, and Samuel Maxwell and his younger children (surviving son Williamson Maxwell, who had become a printer, and two unmarried daughters) had moved about 45 miles away, to Indianapolis, the state capital and county seat of Marion County, Indiana.

After the resignation of Indianapolis mayor William J. Wallace (who had won an election to fill the remainder of the term of Henry F. West, who had died in office), Samuel Maxwell won the election to replace him. Like Wallace but unlike West, Maxwell was the candidate of the new Republican Party. He was re-elected twice (defeating James McCready and then James R. Bracken) and held office from 1858 to 1863, at which time he declined to run for re-election. Maxwell founded the Indianapolis Fire Department in the fall of 1859, taking it from a combination volunteer to all career department by creating a board to oversee the transition. He appointed Joseph W. Davis as the department's first Chief Fire Engineer. His grandson, Samuel Anderson Maxwell, would become a fireman with the department in 1880.

Maxwell and Indiana governor Oliver P. Morton escorted fellow Republican Abraham Lincoln in a parade through Indianapolis as president-elect Lincoln traveled to Washington, D.C., for his inauguration. During the American Civil War, Maxwell cooperated with Governor Morton, and was succeeded by fellow Republican lawyer John Caven in 1863.

Maxwell died in Indianapolis in 1873 (aged about 70 years), and was buried at Crown Hill Cemetery.
