= Horatio C. Newcomb =

American politician (1821–1882)

Horatio Newcomb

2nd Mayor of Indianapolis
- In office 1849 – November 7, 1851
- Preceded by: James McCready
- Succeeded by: Caleb Scudder

Personal details
- Born: December 20, 1821 Wellsboro, Pennsylvania, U.S.
- Died: May 23, 1882 (aged 60)
- Resting place: Crown Hill Cemetery and Arboretum, Section 3, Lot 46, indianapolis, indiana 39.8179964°N 86.173174°W
- Party: Whig

Horatio C. Newcomb (December 20, 1821—May 23, 1882) was an American attorney and judge from Indianapolis, Indiana. He also served as the second mayor of Indianapolis.

== Early life ==
Newcomb was born in Wellsboro, Tioga County, Pennsylvania. At some point the family moved to Cortland County, New York, and in 1833 the family moved to Vernon, Jennings County, Indiana. In 1836, Newcomb started as an apprentice in horse harness and saddle making.

== Career ==
In 1841, Newcomb began to study law under his uncle, Judge William C. Bullock, the first attorney to set up practice in Jennings County. Newcomb was licensed to practice in 1844 and practiced in Vernon until 1846. He moved to Indianapolis and became a partner with Ovid Butler, Calvin Fletcher, and Simon Yandes.

In 1849, Newcomb was elected mayor of Indianapolis at the age of 27, the youngest mayor in Indianapolis history. He was reelected in 1851. He was elected to the Indiana General Assembly from Marion County in 1854 and to the Indiana State Senate in 1860. In 1861, he resigned and was appointed president of the Board of Commissioners of the Sinking Fund. In 1864, he became political editor of the Indianapolis Daily Journal. From 1864 to 1868, he was again elected to the General Assembly.

Newcomb resumed his law practice after retiring from political life. In 1871, Governor Conrad Baker made Newcomb a judge on the Superior Court of Marion County along with Solomon Blair and Frederick Rand. He was reelected to the position in 1878. Just a few days after the appointment, President Ulysses S. Grant appointed him Assistant Secretary of the United States Department of the Interior. He was a Republican. From 1880 to 1881, Newcomb served as president of the Indianapolis Bar Association.
