= 70th Indiana Infantry Regiment =

70th Regiment Indiana Infantry
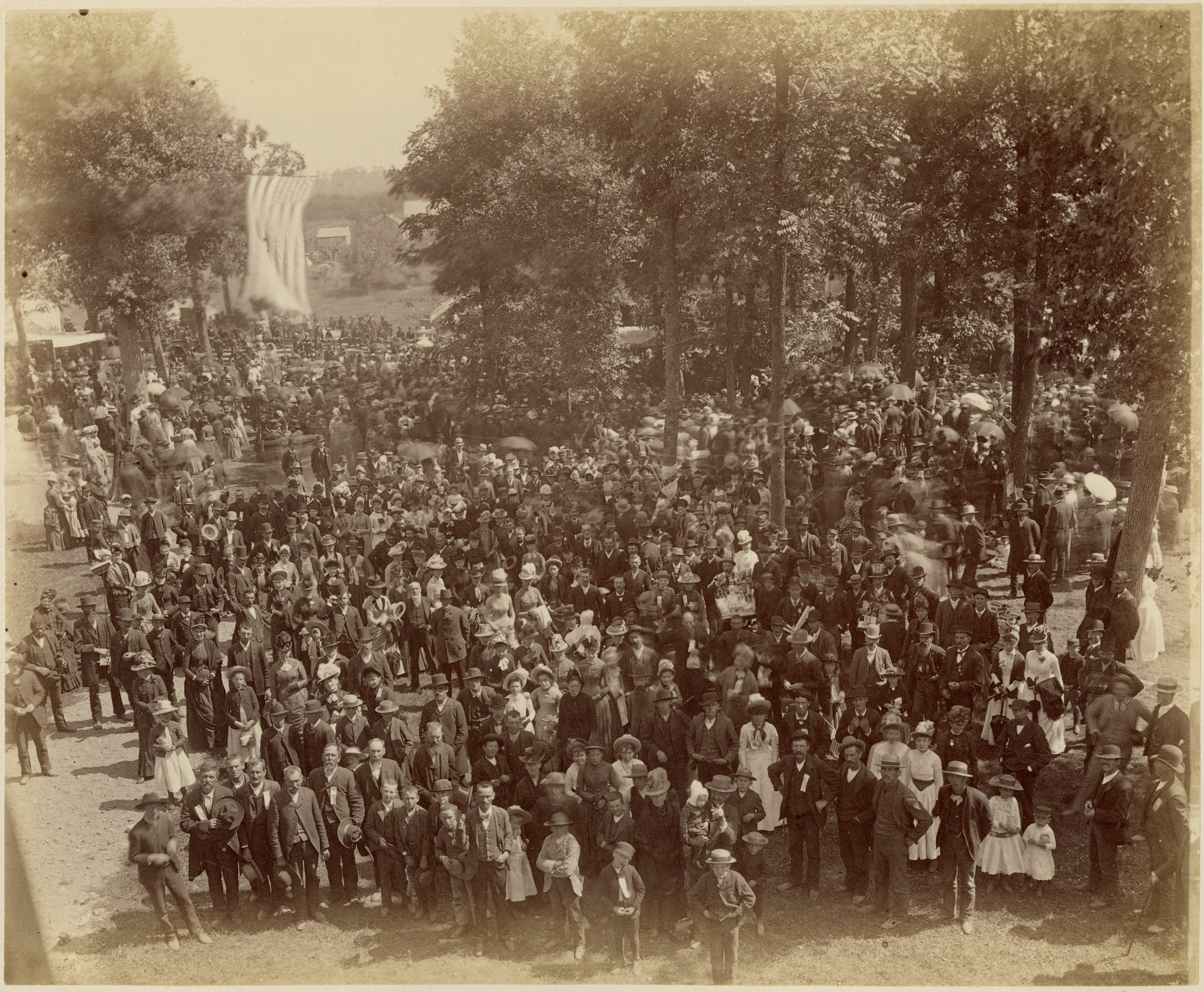
- A crowd listens to former commander Benjamin Harrison speaking to fellow 70th Indiana Infantry Regiment veterans at a reunion at Clayton, Indiana in 1888.
- Active: July 22, 1862 – June 8, 1865
- Country: United States
- Allegiance: Union
- Branch: Infantry
- Engagements: Atlanta campaign Battle of Resaca; Battle of New Hope Church; Battle of Kennesaw Mountain; Siege of Atlanta; Sherman's March to the Sea; Carolinas campaign Battle of Bentonville

The 70th Regiment Indiana Infantry was an infantry regiment that served in the Union Army during the American Civil War.

== Service ==
The 70th Indiana Infantry was organized at Indianapolis, Indiana July 22 through August 8, 1862, and mustered in for a three-year enlistment under the command of Colonel Benjamin Harrison.

The regiment was attached to District of Louisville, Kentucky, Department of the Ohio, to November 1862. Ward's Brigade, Dumont's 12th Division, Army of the Cumberland, to December 1862. Ward's Brigade, Post of Gallatin, Tennessee, Department of the Cumberland, to June 1863. 2nd Brigade, 3rd Division Reserve Corps, Department of the Cumberland, to October 1863. Ward's Brigade, Post and District of Nashville, Tennessee, Department of the Cumberland, to January 1864. 1st Brigade, 1st Division, XI Corps, Army of the Cumberland, to April 1864. 1st Brigade, 3rd Division, XX Corps, Army of the Cumberland, to June 1865.

Veterans and recruits from the 27th Indiana Infantry were transferred to the 70th Indiana Infantry on November 4, 1864, when the 27th Indiana Infantry was mustered out of service. The 70th Indiana Infantry mustered out of service at Washington, D.C., on June 9, 1865. Recruits were transferred to the 33rd Indiana Infantry.

== Detailed service ==
Left Indiana for Louisville, Kentucky, August 13. Moved from Louisville, to Bowling Green, Kentucky, August 1862. Duty there and along line of the Louisville & Nashville Railroad until November. Skirmishes at Russellville and Glasgow September 30. Moved to Scottsville November 10, then to Gallatin, Tennessee, November 24, and duty along Louisville & Nashville Railroad from Gallatin to Nashville, Tennessee, until February 9, 1863. Garrison duty at Gallatin until June 1. Moved to Lavergne June 1, thence to Murfreesboro, Tennessee, June 30. Duty at Fort Rosecrans, Murfreesboro, until August 19. Moved to Nashville, Tennessee, August 19, and picket and fatigue duty at that point until February 24, 1864. Skirmish at Tullahoma, Tennessee, October 23, 1863. March to Wauhatchie, Tennessee, February 24-March 10. Atlanta Campaign May 1-September 8. Demonstrations on Rocky Faced Ridge May 8–11. Battle of Resaca May 14–15. Near Cassville May 19–24. Combat at New Hope Church May 25. Operations on line of Pumpkin Vine Creek and battles about Dallas, New Hope Church, and Allatoona Hills May 25-June 5. Operations about Marietta and against Kennesaw Mountain June 10-July 2. Pine Mountain June 11–14. Lost Mountain June 15–17. Gilgal or Golgotha Church June 15. Muddy Creek June 17. Noyes Creek June 19. Kolb's Farm June 22. Assault on Kennesaw June 27. Ruff's or Neal Dow Station, Smyrna Camp Ground, July 4. Chattahoochie River July 5–17. Peachtree Creek July 19–20. Siege of Atlanta July 22-August 25. Operations at Chattahoochie River Bridge August 26-September 2. Occupation of Atlanta September 2-November 15. Near Turner's and Howell's Ferries, Chattahoochie River, October 19 (detachment). March to the sea November 15-December 10. Siege of Savannah December 10–21. Campaign of the Carolinas January to April 1865. Lawtonville, South Carolina, February 2. Taylor's Hole Creek, Averysboro, North Carolina, March 16. Battle of Bentonville March 19–21. Occupation of Goldsboro March 24. Advance on Raleigh April 10–14. Occupation of Raleigh April 14. Bennett's House April 26. Surrender of Johnston and his army. March to Washington, D.C., via Richmond, Virginia, April 29-May 19. Grand Review of the Armies May 24.

== Casualties ==
The regiment lost a total of 203 men during service; two officers and 96 enlisted men killed or mortally wounded, two officers and 103 enlisted men died of disease.

== Commanders ==
- Colonel Benjamin Harrison
- Lieutenant Colonel Samuel Merrill – commanded the regiment after Col Harrison was promoted to brigade command

== Notable members ==
- Benjamin Harrison, Colonel – 23rd President of the United States, 1889–1893
- Lieutenant James L. Mitchell – regimental adjutant and 11th mayor of Indianapolis, 1873–1875

== See also ==
- List of Indiana Civil War regiments
- Indiana in the Civil War
