= Caleb Scudder =

American politician

3rd Mayor of Indianapolis
- In office 1851–1854
- Preceded by: Horatio C. Newcomb
- Succeeded by: James McCready

Personal details
- Born: 1795 New Jersey, U.S.
- Died: 1886 (aged 90–91) Indianapolis, Indiana, U.S
- Resting place: Crown Hill Cemetery and Arboretum, Section 22, Lot 52, indianapolis, indiana
- Party: Whig

Caleb Scudder (1795 in New Jersey – 1866 in Indianapolis, Indiana) was the third mayor of the city of Indianapolis, Indiana, and served from 1851 to 1854 as a member of the Whig Party. Born in New Jersey, Scudder moved at a young age to Dayton, Ohio. He was a cabinet-maker by trade, but also served as a magistrate before his term as mayor.
