= Caleb S. Denny =

American politician (1850–1926)

- Born: May 13, 1850; Monroe County, Indiana
- Died: March 24, 1926 (aged 75)
- Resting place: Crown Hill Cemetery and Arboretum, Section 7, Lot 24
- Title: The 15th and 17th Mayor of Indianapolis, Indiana
- Term: 1885-1889 and 1892-1894
- Political party: Republican

Caleb Stone Denny (May 13, 1850, in Monroe County, Indiana – March 24, 1926) was an American politician who served as the 15th and 17th mayor of the city of Indianapolis, Indiana. Denny first worked as a teacher and librarian before completing a law degree. He served as the assistant attorney general of Indiana from 1873 to 1875. In 1885, Denny resigned his position of city attorney to try to obtain the Republican nomination for mayor of Indianapolis. He ran successfully against incumbent mayor John L. McMaster and won the subsequent election by only 60 votes (out of approximately 18,000). Denny was reelected in 1887. He chose not to run in 1889 and Democrat Thomas L. Sullivan was elected as mayor. In 1892, Denny returned to politics and defeated Sullivan. He served a single term.

Denny's son, George L. Denny also served as mayor for 6 months (1947–1948).
