= List of delegates to the 1816 Indiana constitutional convention =

Forty-three men from the Indiana Territory were elected to attend a constitutional convention to consider statehood for Indiana. The delegates convened at Corydon, the territorial capital, from June 10 through June 29, 1816. On June 11 the delegation passed a resolution (34 to 8) to proceed with the task of writing the state's first constitution and forming a state government. An Enabling Act, which President James Madison signed into law on April 19, 1816, provided for the election of the delegates that took place on May 13, 1816. The delegation was apportioned among thirteen counties in the territory and based on each county's population.

Jonathan Jennings, an elected delegate from Clark County, presided over the convention; William Hendricks, although he was not an elected delegate, served as the convention's secretary. The delegation adopted the state constitution with a simply majority vote (33 to 8). It went into effect on June 29, 1816.

The convention's elected delegates were:

| Name | County Represented |
|---|---|
| Thomas Carr Sr. | Clark County |
| John K. Graham | Clark County |
| Jonathan Jennings | Clark County |
| James Lemen (James Lemon) | Clark County |
| James Scott | Clark County |
| James Dill | Dearborn County |
| Ezra Ferris | Dearborn County |
| Solomon Manwaring | Dearborn County |
| James Brownless | Franklin County |
| William H. Eads | Franklin County |
| Robert Hanna | Franklin County |
| Enoch McCarty | Franklin County |
| James Noble | Franklin County |
| Alexander Devin | Gibson County |
| Frederick Rapp | Gibson County |
| David Robb | Gibson County |
| James Smith | Gibson County |
| John Boone | Harrison County |
| Davis Floyd | Harrison County |
| Daniel C. Lane | Harrison County |
| Dennis Pennington | Harrison County |
| Patrick Shields | Harrison County |
| Nathaniel Hunt | Jefferson County |
| David H. Maxwell | Jefferson County |
| Samuel Smock | Jefferson County |
| John Badollet | Knox County |
| John Benefiel | Knox County |
| John Johnson | Knox County |
| William Polke | Knox County |
| Benjamin Parke | Knox County |
| Charles Polke | Perry County |
| Dann Lynn | Posey County |
| William Cotton | Switzerland County |
| Daniel Grass | Warrick County |
| John DePauw | Washington County |
| William Graham | Washington County |
| William Lowe | Washington County |
| Samuel Milroy | Washington County |
| Robert McIntire | Washington County |
| Patrick Beard | Wayne County |
| Jeremiah Cox | Wayne County |
| Hugh Cull | Wayne County |
| Joseph Holman | Wayne County |
