= James McCready =

American politician

4th Mayor of Indianapolis
- In office 1856 – November 8, 1856
- Preceded by: Caleb Scudder
- Succeeded by: Charles G. Coulon

Personal details
- Born: 1816
- Died: 1909 (aged 92–93)
- Resting place: Crown Hill Cemetery and Arboretum, Section 35, Lot 242
- Party: Democratic

James McCready (1816–1909) was the fourth mayor of the city of Indianapolis, Indiana, and the first Democrat to hold that office. As mayor, McCready appointed the city's first police force.

== Death ==
James McCready died in 1909. His remains are interred at Crown Hill Cemetery in Indianapolis, Section 35, Lot 242.
