= Thomas L. Sullivan =

American politician (1846–1936)

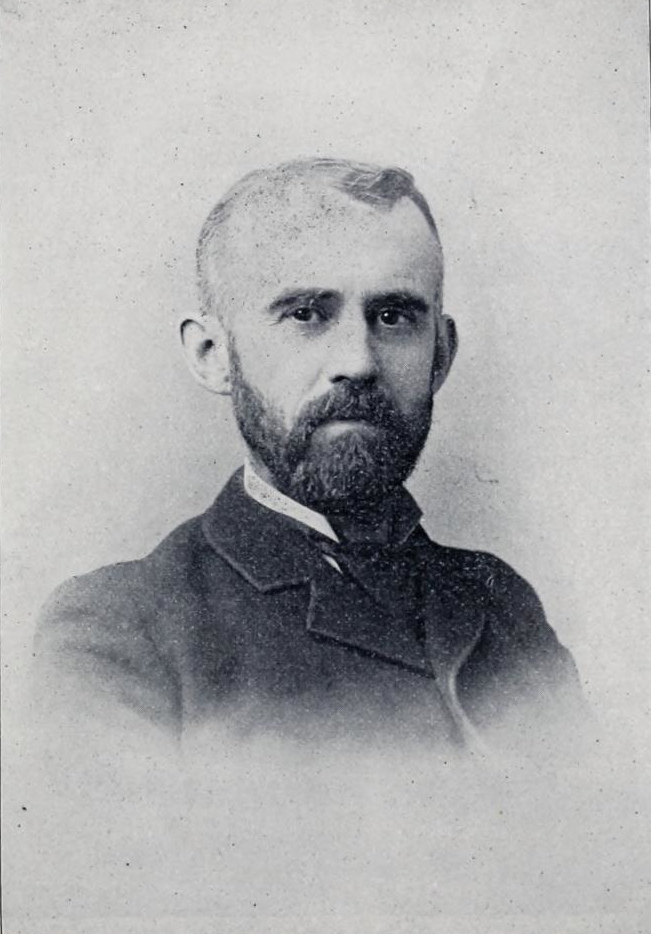
- Thomas L. Sullivan, Mayor of Indianapolis
- Born: October 6, 1846; Indianapolis, Indiana
- Died: July 9, 1936 (aged 89); Indianapolis, IN
- Resting place: Crown Hill Cemetery and Arboretum, Section 12, Lot 9; 39.88200782°N 86.1720046°W
- Title: Mayor of Indianapolis, Indiana
- Predecessor: Caleb S. Denny
- Successor: Caleb S. Denny
- Political party: Democrat
- Children: Reginald H. Sullivan
- Relatives: Oliver H. Smith

Thomas Lennox Sullivan (October 6, 1846 in Indianapolis, Indiana – July 9, 1936 in Indianapolis) was the 16th mayor of the city of Indianapolis, Indiana. In 1889, he ran for mayor as a Democrat, was elected and succeeded Caleb S. Denny who had chosen not to run. He lost his reelection bid to Denny in 1892.

Sullivan was the grandson of senator Oliver H. Smith and the father of Reginald H. Sullivan who was also a mayor of the city (1930–1935, 1939–1943).
