= Charles W. Jewett (Indiana politician) =

American politician and lawyer

- Preceded by: Joseph E. Bell
- Succeeded by: Samuel L. Shank

Personal details
- Resting place: Crown Hill Cemetery and Arboretum Section 46, Lot 84

Charles Webster Jewett (January 7, 1884 – April 28, 1961 in Indianapolis, Indiana) was an Indiana lawyer and Republican politician. Jewett, who studied law at Harvard University, was chosen as chairman of the Marion County Republican Committee in 1914. He was the mayor of Indianapolis from 1918 to 1921. In the 1917 Republican primary election for the mayoral candidacy, Jewett had defeated Samuel L. Shank who eventually succeeded him as mayor. In 1938, Jewett ran for a seat in the United States House of Representatives and lost to the incumbent Louis Ludlow.

Political offices
| Preceded by Joseph E. Bell | Mayor of Indianapolis; 1918–1922 | Succeeded by Samuel L. Shank |
