= Reginald H. Sullivan =

American politician (1876–1980)

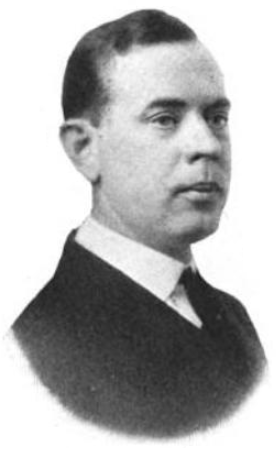

30th and 33rd Mayor of Indianapolis
- In office 1930–1934
- In office 1938–1942

Member of the Indiana Senate
- In office 1910–1914

Personal details
- Born: March 10, 1876 Indianapolis, Indiana, U.S.
- Died: January 30, 1980 (aged 103) Indianapolis, Indiana, U.S.
- Resting place: Crown Hill Cemetery and Arboretum, Section 12, Lot 9; 39.8200679°N 86.1720448°W
- Party: Democratic
- Parent: Thomas Lennox Sullivan (father)
- Education: Wabash College; Indiana University School of Law
- Occupation: Lawyer, politician

Reginald Hall Sullivan (March 10, 1876 – January 30, 1980) was an American politician who served as the 30th and 33rd mayor of the city of Indianapolis, Indiana, and an Indiana State Senator. He is among the longest-lived Americans to ever be a mayor of any city. He came from a political family with his father, Thomas Lennox Sullivan, being a former mayor of Indianapolis. He was also a lifelong bachelor who was among the first people entered into the "Indiana Hall of Fame" in 1974.

== Biography ==
Reginald H. Sullivan was born in Indianapolis on March 10, 1876. He received his education there, graduating from Wabash College in 1897 and the Indiana University School of Law in 1899.

He entered politics as a Democrat, and served as an Indiana state senator from 1910 to 1914. He was elected mayor of Indianapolis twice, serving from 1930 to 1934 and from 1938 to 1942.

Sullivan died in Indianapolis on January 30, 1980, and was buried at Crown Hill Cemetery.
