= Henry F. West =

American politician

Henry West
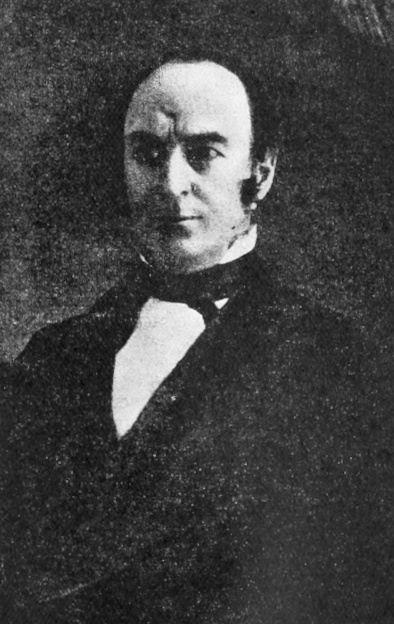

5th Mayor of Indianapolis
- In office 1856 – November 8, 1856
- Preceded by: James McCready
- Succeeded by: Charles G. Coulon

Personal details
- Born: March 14, 1796 Pittsfield, Massachusetts, U.S.
- Died: November 8, 1856 (aged 60) Indianapolis, Indiana, U.S.
- Resting place: Crown Hill Cemetery and Arboretum, Section 6, Lot 6
- Party: Democratic

Henry Franklin West (March 14, 1796 – November 8, 1856) was the fifth mayor of the city of Indianapolis, Indiana. West, a Democrat, took office in 1856 but died within the first month of his term.

== Biography ==
Henry F. West was born in Pittsfield, Massachusetts on March 14, 1796.

He died in Indianapolis on November 8, 1856.
