= Charles G. Coulon =

American politician

Charles Coulon

6th Mayor of Indianapolis
- In office November 8, 1856 – November 22, 1856
- Preceded by: Henry F. West
- Succeeded by: William J. Wallace

Personal details
- Born: February 16, 1825 Göttingen, Germany
- Died: February 2, 1881 (aged 55) Wabash, Indiana, U.S
- Party: Democratic

Charles G. Coulon (16 February 1825, in Göttingen, Germany – 2 February 1881) was the sixth mayor of the city of Indianapolis, Indiana. Coulon emigrated from Germany in 1847 to avoid military service. Coulon arrived in Indianapolis in 1852 where he studied law and eventually opened an office. He was elected as justice of the peace in 1856. In November of that year, then mayor Henry F. West died and Coulon was appointed as interim mayor by the city council. He held office for two weeks and was replaced by William J. Wallace who won the extraordinary election. Coulon finished his first term as justice of peace (1864–1860), a post he also held from 1864 to 1868.
