= James L. Mitchell =

American politician

James L. Mitchell (September 29, 1834 – February 22, 1894) was an American lawyer, army officer and 11th mayor of the city of Indianapolis, Indiana.

Mitchell was born in Shelby County, Kentucky, and settled in Indianapolis in 1859, where he read law. During the American Civil War, Mitchell was an officer in the 70th Regiment Indiana Infantry and, near the end of the war, a major on the staff of General Lovell Rousseau. He returned to his law practice following the war (a notable partner at his firm was William A. Ketcham, who later served as Indiana Attorney General) and in 1873 became the first Democratic Party mayor of Indianapolis since Charles G. Coulon twenty-seven years earlier. In fact from 1856 to 1890, Mitchell's two-year term (1873–1875) is the only one not served by a Republican.
