= Daniel W. Grubbs =

American politician (1835–1917)

- Born: May 19, 1835; Indianapolis, Indiana
- Died: February 5, 1917; Harrodsburg, Kentucky
- Burial place: Crown Hill Cemetery and Arboretum, Section 14, Lot 105
- Occupation(s): Lawyer, businessman and politician. Served as the 13th mayor of Indianapolis, Indiana.

Daniel Webster Grubbs (May 19, 1835 – February 5, 1917) was an American lawyer, businessman and politician who served as the 13th mayor of the city of Indianapolis, Indiana. Born in Henry County, Indiana, Grubbs moved to Indianapolis in 1857 to study law. His political career began in 1878 when he was elected alderman. Grubbs, a Republican, resigned in 1881 during his successful campaign for mayor. He served a single term (1881–1884) and did not seek re-election. Instead, he returned to his business career and moved to Parral, Mexico, where he managed the mining and banking interests of his wife's family.

After his retirement, Grubbs returned to the United States and died in Harrodsburg, Kentucky, in 1917. He is buried in Crown Hill Cemetery (Section 14, Lot 105).
