= List of public art in Crown Hill Cemetery =

Public art in Crown Hill Cemetery, Indianapolis, includes:

Title	Artist	Year	Location/GPS coordinates	Material	Dimensions	Owner	Image
Abel D. Streight		1902	Crown Hill Cemetery 39°49′01″N 86°10′20″W	Bronze, granite	Bust: 34 × 31 × 16 in.; Monument: 13 × 12 1/2 × 8 ft.	Crown Hill Cemetery	
Antenna Man	Eric Nordgulen		Crown Hill Cemetery 39°49′03″N 86°10′27″W				
Beveridge Memorial	John Gregory	1942	Crown Hill Cemetery 39°49′12″N 86°10′14″W	Marble	12 ft. × 78 in. × 78 in	Crown Hill Cemetery	
Bratton Marker	Jeffrey Bratton	1980	Crown Hill Cemetery 39°49′09″N 86°10′13″W	Bronze, granite	12 × 5 1/2 × 4 ft.	Crown Hill Cemetery	
Bust of Oliver P. Morton		1925	Crown Hill Cemetery 39°49′01″N 86°10′20″W		36 × 26 × 19 in.	Crown Hill Cemetery	
Children Swinging			Crown Hill Cemetery 39°49′31″N 86°10′50″W			Crown Hill Cemetery	
Claypool Mausoleum		1910	Crown Hill Cemetery 39°49′01″N 86°10′16″W	Granite	2 ft. × 6 1/2 ft. × 1 1/2 in.	Crown Hill Cemetery	
Corliss Randle Ruckle		1890	Crown Hill Cemetery 39°49′11″N 86°10′18″W	Marble	43 × 25 × 20 in.	Crown Hill Cemetery	
Crown Hill Equatorial Sundial	David Rodgers	1986	Crown Hill Cemetery 39°49′36″N 86°10′23″W	Limestone	94 in. × 8 ft. × 91 in.	Crown Hill Cemetery	
Duden Monument		1915	Crown Hill Cemetery 39°49′23″N 86°10′01″W	Marble, granite	55 × 31 × 23 in	Crown Hill Cemetery	
E. Zoller Memorial		1885	Crown Hill Cemetery 39°49′19″N 86°9′57″W	Granite	6 ft. × 51 in. × 27 in	Crown Hill Cemetery	
Eagle Monument		1976	Crown Hill Cemetery 39°49′37″N 86°10′28″W			Crown Hill Cemetery	
Eastman Monument		1925	Crown Hill Cemetery 39°49′11″N 86°10′30″W	Marble, granite		Crown Hill Cemetery	
Frese Monument		1885	Crown Hill Cemetery 39°49′09″N 86°10′05″W	Limestone, granite	Tree: 80 × 22 × 26 in.; Dog: 18 × 12 × 51 in.	Crown Hill Cemetery	
G.A.R. Monument	James F. Needler	1889	Crown Hill Cemetery 39°49′39″N 86°10′23″W	Limestone	28 × 21 × 21 in.	Crown Hill Cemetery	
Heroes of Public Safety Monument		2002	Crown Hill Cemetery 39°48′57″N 86°10′19″W	Limestone		Crown Hill Cemetery	
Hildebrand Monument	Joyce & Diener, fabricator	1875	Crown Hill Cemetery 39°49′05″N 86°10′14″W	Marble and granite	7 ft. × 20 in. × 20 in	Crown Hill Cemetery	
Holcomb Mausoleum Door	Amick & Wearley Monuments	1953	Crown Hill Cemetery 39°48′59″N 86°10′13″W	Bronze, glass, granite	78 × 39 × 4 in.	Crown Hill Cemetery	
Indiana AIDS Memorial		2000	Crown Hill Cemetery 39°49′18″N 86°10′35″W			Crown Hill Cemetery	
Lilly Monument	David Kresz Rubins	1960	Crown Hill Cemetery 39°49′11″N 86°10′34″W	Bronze, pink granite	7 ft. × 5 ft. × 16 in.	Crown Hill Cemetery	
Lions Flanking Marott Tomb		1924	Crown Hill Cemetery 39°49′21″N 86°10′01″W	Granite	Right lion: 27 × 18 1/2 × 51 1/2 in.; Left lion: 22 × 18 1/2 × 51 in;	Crown Hill Cemetery	
Mary Ella McGinnis		1876	Crown Hill Cemetery 39°49′00″N 86°10′19″W	Marble, granite	51 × 16 × 17 in.	Crown Hill Cemetery	
The Return		2004	Crown Hill Cemetery 39°49′27″N 86°10′07″W	Marble, bronze		Dr. Robert E. Smith & family	
Sayles Monument		1925	Crown Hill Cemetery 39°49′00″N 86°10′15″W	Granite	Relief: 75 × 40 × 11 in.; Base: 16 × 10 × 7 1/2 ft.	Crown Hill Cemetery	
Shepherd's Way			Crown Hill Cemetery			Crown Hill Cemetery	
Social Attachments	Michael B. Wilken	2004	Crown Hill Cemetery 39°49′18″N 86°10′27″W	Aluminum		Crown Hill Cemetery	
Themis, Demeter, Persephone		1873	Crown Hill Cemetery 39°49′26″N 86°10′22″W	Painted limestone	3 figures, each 10 ft. 2 in. × 41 in. × 26 in.	Crown Hill Cemetery	Themis
Woman in Repose (Forrest Monument)	Rudolph Schwarz	1904	Crown Hill Cemetery 39°49′07″N 86°10′14″W	Bronze	32 × 38 × 53 in.	Crown Hill Cemetery	

== See also ==
- List of public art in Indianapolis
