= Eastman Monument =

Artwork at Crown Hill National Cemetery, Indianapolis, Indiana

- Year: 20th century
- Type: Marble, Granite
- Location: Indianapolis, Indiana, United States; 39°49′11″N 86°10′30″W
- Owner: Crown Hill National Cemetery

The Eastman Monument is a public artwork by an unknown artist, located at Crown Hill National Cemetery, which is in Indianapolis, Indiana, United States. It is a monument with a white marble angel standing against a granite cross that is standing upon three steps. The angel is dressed in a cloth gown and stands with its hands spread out and its head turned down to the ground. The first step has "EASTMAN" written across it.

== Information ==
This monument was installed by the Eastman family in the early 20th century. Members of the Eastman family are buried in front of the monument. The family operated a medical clinic called the Eastman Clinic in the early 20th century, which is displayed on the headstones of the family members who worked in the medical field.
