= Washington Historic District (Washington, Kentucky) =

Historic district in Kentucky, United States

- U.S. National Register of Historic Places
- U.S. Historic district
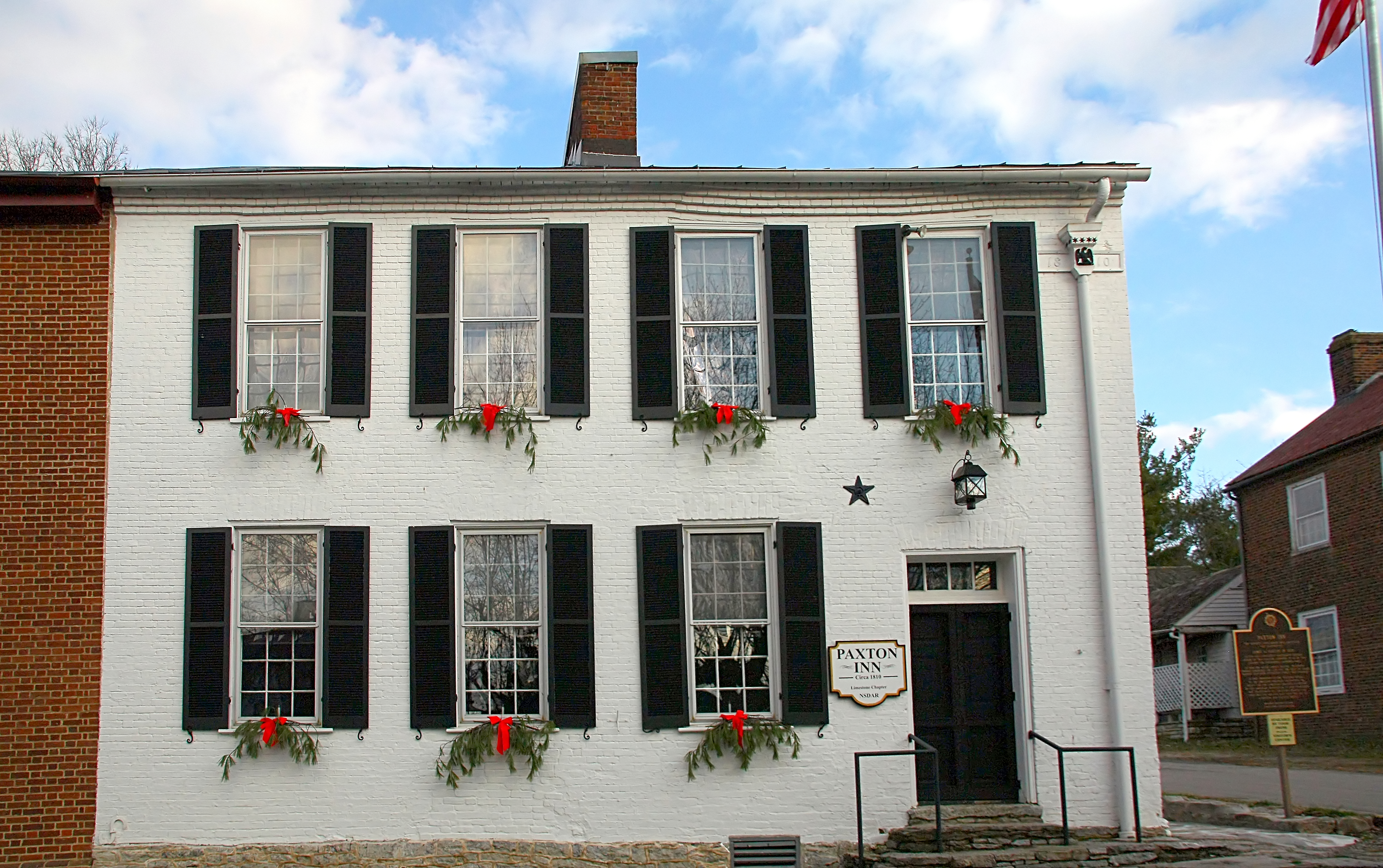
- Paxton Inn in Washington Historic District

- Location within Kentucky Location within the United States
- Location: Roughly bounded by Hoppe St., Bartlett Lane, and city limits on E & W, (original), and extending N & S along U.S. 62 & 68, (increase); Washington, Kentucky
- Coordinates: 38°36′50″N 83°48′28″W
- Architectural style: Georgian, Federal (original) and Gothic (increase)
- NRHP reference No.: 70000253 and 76002274
- Added to NRHP: January 21, 1970 (original); May 28, 1976 (increase)

The Washington Historic District in Washington, Kentucky was listed on the National Register of Historic Places in 1970, and its borders were increased in 1976. The buildings of Washington range from simple log cabins to late Georgian and early Federal styles constructed of home burned brick laid in Flemish bond. Many houses have double doors at the entrance and a reeded roll length wise under a four light transom.

== Architecture ==
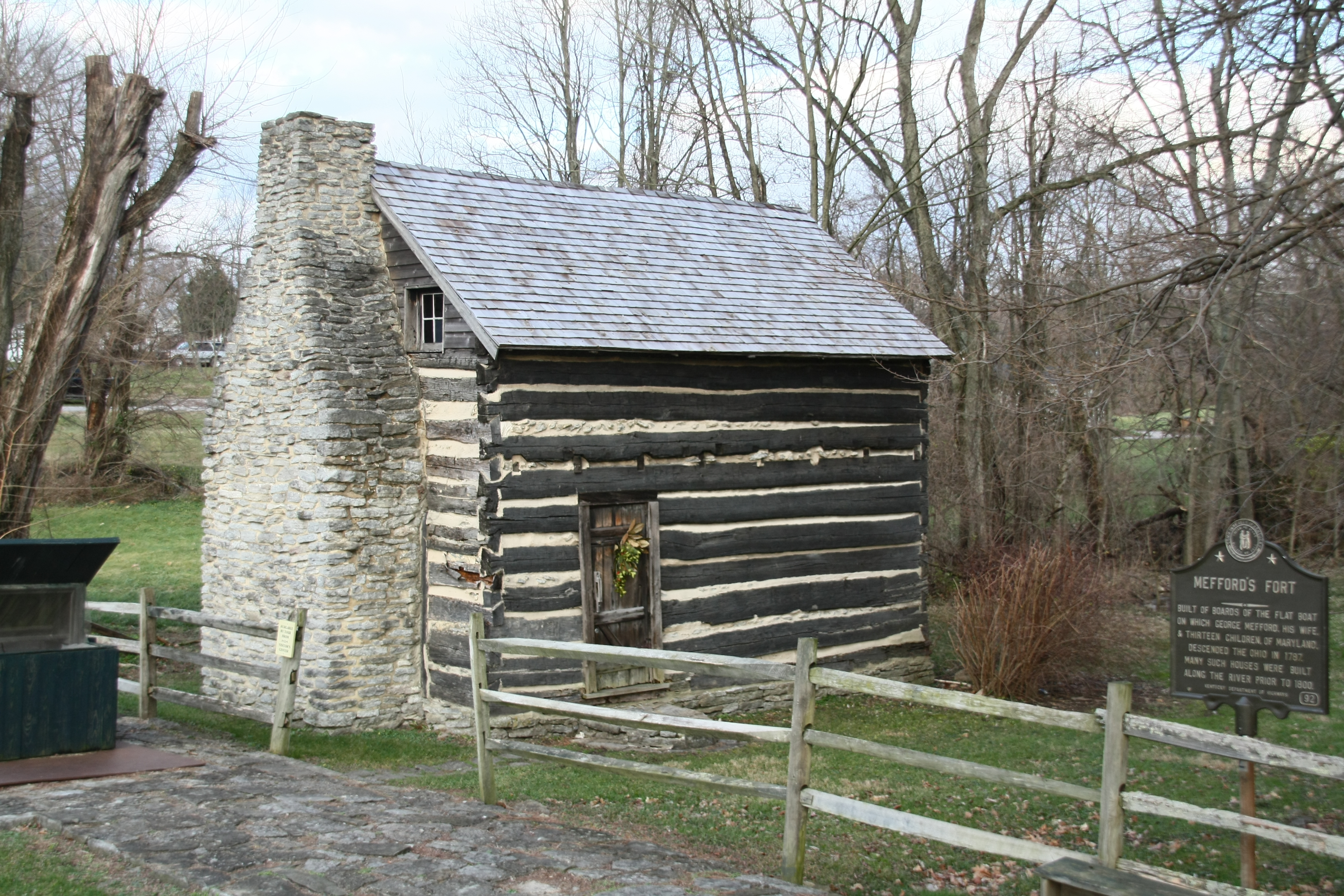
Log cabin built from "flat boat" lumber

The significant architecture of Washington covers the period 1765–1850. Taking into account the time lag between architectural styles fashionable on the Atlantic seaboard and in the frontier, the lack of refined, period examples within the town that can be found elsewhere in the state becomes understandable. Eighteen buildings were earmarked within the boundaries of the original historic district (approved January 21, 1970). They included the most important buildings historically and architecturally, for example:

- The Paxton Inn (c. 1810), a brick three-story Federal style example of an early Kentucky public inn
- Albert Sidney Johnston House, representative of simple early frame domestic buildings in Kentucky, is reputed to be the birthplace and childhood home of Confederate States of America Army General, Albert Sidney Johnston
- Federal Hill (1800), is a two-story brick house with transitional details of Georgian and Federal styles built by Colonel Thomas Marshall and completed by his son. Another son, John Marshall, became the Chief Justice of the United States Supreme Court (1801–1835).
- Marshall Key House (1807), a two-story brick house, has a Federal style main body with a Georgian style doorway. The builder was Colonel Marshall Key, who moved to Kentucky in 1795.
- Arthur Fox House (also Fox-Bickley House, c. 1785), a two-story frame and nogging clapboarded structure, was built by one of the original trustees of Washington.
- The rich variety of buildings include a "flat-boat house", the only surviving example of this unique kind of structure, a bank, an inn, row buildings, churches, a school building, a group of log, frame, brick, and stone homes along with several types of outbuildings.

== Early history ==
The founding of Washington dates back to May 1775, when a group of ten men arrived from farther east in Virginia to survey and improve lands. One of the men, Jonathan Higgs, built a cabin near the present east end of York Street in Washington. The most influential of the group was Simon Kenton, who cleared about an acre of land at a site about 1.5 miles from Washington.

In 1785, Simon Kenton sold 700 acres to two Virginians, Arthur Fox and William Wood, who decided to lay out a one-mile square grid-iron site, sell lots, and turn a profit. The town was named "Washington" with the intention that it might become the national capital and was the first town in America to be so named.

Washington's early commercial success stemmed from its location. Those settlers who landed at Limestone and who wished to travel to the Kentucky interior had to negotiate a steep hill to the plateau three and one-half miles away where Washington stands. This required a full day to drive a heavily loaded wagon the short distance and therefore most elected to stop overnight at the town before continuing the inland journey.

== High period ==
Washington was once the second-largest town in Kentucky as reported by the first federal census of 1790 which lists four hundred sixty-two residents living in one hundred nineteen houses. It became the county seat in 1788 when Mason County was formed.

By 1794, when the Mason County Courthouse was built, the town had already become one of the most dominant in the state. The resulting influx of lawyers and others concerned with court activities led to the establishment of a number of taverns and inns. The Washington post office was designated as the mail distribution center for the entire Northwest Territory including the present states of Ohio, Indiana, Illinois, Michigan and Wisconsin.

== Decline ==
After the start of the 19th century, Washington experienced a slow decline. One traveler passing through on November 25, 1818, described the town as being "laid out on a large plan but not thriving". Disaster struck in April 1825, when a fire destroyed thirteen buildings including two taverns.

A second misfortune occurred in 1820 when the Lexington and Ohio Railroad was laid out from Lexington to the Ohio River bypassing Washington, a serious blow to the future economy of the town. Outbreaks of cholera in 1832 and 1833 and significantly reduced the population. The nearby town of Maysville, however, experienced rapid development between 1830 and 1850, surpassing the growth of Washington. The inevitable happened in 1847 with the decision to transfer the county seat from Washington to Maysville.

== Archaeological report ==
An archaeological survey was completed during the summer of 1975. The physical survey and historical research of others led to the discovery of additional historic sites and artifacts both inside and outside of the original historic district boundary.

The surface collection of artifacts within the township provided a good chronological overview of the areas cultural remains and their development. A total of 1,858 artifacts were recovered from the surface, and represent occupational periods from c. 1785 through more recent times. Pearlware, ironstone, and various heavy stoneware - including American blue on grey - were collected throughout the township. Recovered glass artifacts included basal fragments of bottles bearing pre-1860 pontil scars, dark olive or "black" glass, canning jar fragments, and a considerable amount of the sun-colored amethyst glass characteristic of the period 1880–1914. Metallic artifacts include hand-wrought pieces, small iron chains, a boot scraper, and 19th century building hardware.
