= Hildebrand Monument =

Cemetery artwork in Indianapolis, Indiana

- Artist: Joyce & Diener
- Year: 1870s
- Type: Marble & Granite
- Dimensions: 210 cm × 51 cm × 51 cm (84 in × 20 in × 20 in); 18 ft (5.5 m) column
- Location: Indianapolis, Indiana, United States; 39°49′05″N 86°10′14″W
- Owner: Crown Hill National Cemetery

The Hildebrand Monument is a public artwork fabricated by Joyce & Diener and located at Crown Hill National Cemetery in Indianapolis, Indiana, United States. The monument marks the graves of Henry W. Hildebrand and his three children, William H., Louisa E., and George H. Hildebrand. It features an eighteen-foot column mounted on a rectangular base made of granite with a cornice that is peaked and a tiered bottom section. On top of the cornice is a full-sized statue of Henry W. Hildebrand (c. 1836–1876) wearing a frockcoat. In his left hand is an anchor and his right hand is upraised in the air. Behind him is a tree stump.

== Information ==
The front of the base proper left has fabrication stamp:

JOYCE & DIENER
212 W. WASH.St.
City.

The lower front of the base displays in raised lettering: HILDEBRAND.

Inscribed on the rear of the base is:

WILLIAM H.
BORN
JULY 25, 1860.
DIED
SEPT. 3. 1860
--
LOUISA E.
BORN
OCT. 21, 1861.
DIED NOV. 9. 1861.
GEORGE H.
BORN NOV. (illegible) 1865.
DIED (illegible) 1866.

The east side of the base states:

HENRY W.
HILDEBRAND
BORN
FEB. 9. 1836
DIED
AUG. 15. 1876.

There is also an unsigned Founder's mark.
