= Josephine R. Nichols =

American lecturer and temperance reformer (1838–1897)

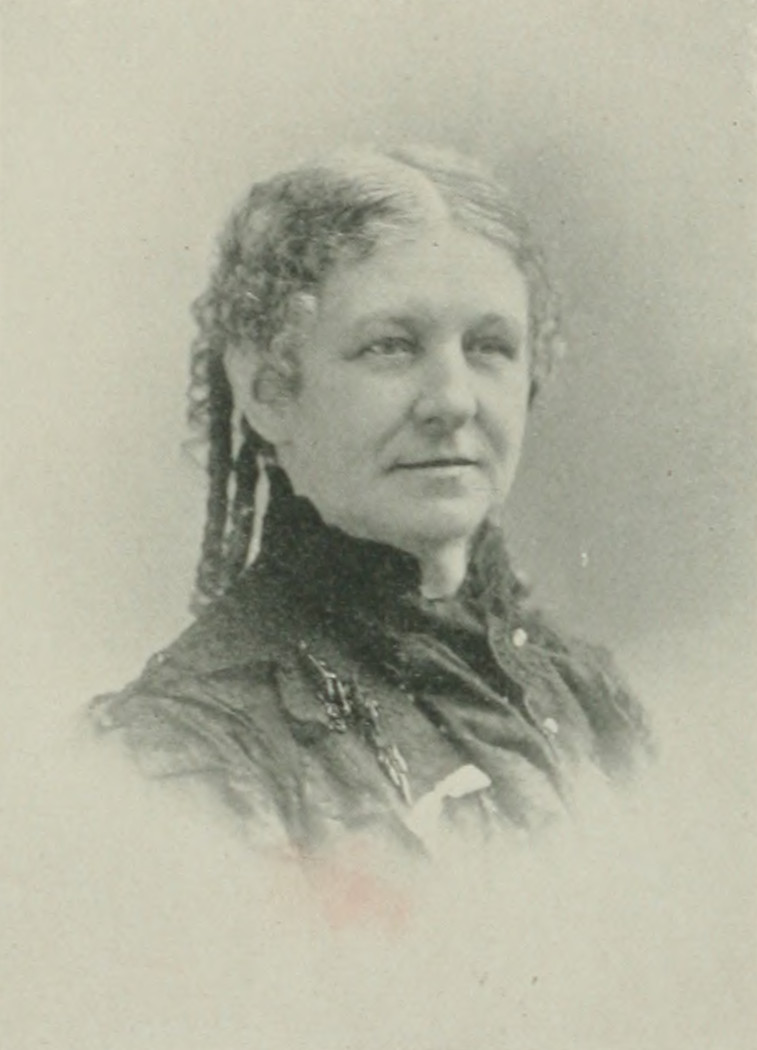
- Portrait from A Woman of the Century
- Born: Josephine Ralston Davis; 1838; Maysville, Kentucky, U.S.
- Died: April 9, 1897 (aged 58–59); Indianapolis, Indiana, U.S.
- Resting place: Crown Hill Cemetery, Indianapolis
- Occupations: lecturer; social reformer; non-fiction writer
- Known for: President, Indiana State Woman's Christian Temperance Union
- Movement: temperance; woman suffrage
- Spouse: Edwin R. Nichols (m. 1858)
- Children: 5

Josephine R. Nichols (née, Davis; 1838–1897) was a popular American lecturer of the 19th-century, and a temperance reformer affiliated with the Woman's Christian Temperance Union (WCTU). She was also a strong advocate of woman suffrage. Her most notable accomplishments were as superintendent of the exposition department of the National WCTU, where she worked for years, beginning in 1883. In 1885, the Indiana State WCTU made her its president, but she continued her practical work for the national society, extending and illustrating information about the aims of the cause.

== Early life and education ==
Josephine Ralston Davis was born in Maysville, Kentucky, in 1838. Her parents were Henry Lovell Davis (1797–1870) and Hannah Gibbons (née, McAllister) (1799–1852). Josephine had four siblings: Henry, Richard, Maria, and Samuel.

She was educated at Maysville Academy, and the Science Hill Seminary, Cincinnati. She boarded in Mr. Rand's family and was brought up by them in the Methodist faith. She was a bright pupil and was what the other pupils called a "show scholar", for she was the one always brought out when there was a special engagement. She had confidence in her own abilities and was the envy of other pupils when she could get up in the courthouse, where the examinations were held and read an essay or make a declamation and not be frightened.

The mother died when Josephine was a young girl, and Josephine went to live with her aunt, a Mrs. Parker, at Ripley, Ohio. In 1855–56, she taught school at Batavia, Ohio.

== Career ==
=== Illinois ===
In 1857, while visiting a brother, a practicing physician at Paris, Illinois, she met Edwin R. Nichols (1828–1904), whom she married in 1858. Mr. and Mrs. Nichols resided in Paris, Illinois for several years after marriage. They had five children: Florence, Benjamin, Hannah, Josephine, and George. For many years, she devoted herself to the cares of home and family.

Some years later, she made a local reputation through occasional contributions to newspapers, and in 1873, she appeared on the lecture platform with two lectures that attracted much attention. The first, entitled "Boys", proved to be popular. Her own two sons at home provided her with material for observation, and provided the fodder for witty, graphic and helpful comments. Her literary productions were excellent, and her natural style soon made her recognized among platform speakers. That led to the preparation of other lectures, one on "Girls", another on "Men", and also "Readings from the Poets". A strong advocate of woman suffrage, she delivered several lectures in its favor.

Attracted to the temperance movement by an address delivered in Maysville by Lucretia Mott, and drawn into the movement started by the WCTU, Nicols added to her list of lectures a number devoted to temperance. Among those were "Woman's Relations to Intemperance", "The Orphans of the Liquor Traffic", and others. The scientific aspects of the work received her special attention. A lecture on "Beer, Wine and Cider" was often called for, and proved so helpful that eventually, she consented to have the first part of it published by the WCTU.

=== Indiana ===
In 1880, the Nichols family removed to Indianapolis.

The first knowledge the public of that city had of Nichols was through her addresses on suffrage and temperance. Her absolute confidence in herself and her subject made her a power, and she soon became identified with public work in both lines. Her first lecture in this city was on the subject of "Boys", and it was delivered in the YMCA hall. She visited many places in this and adjoining States, delivering this and other lectures.

Her greatest accomplishments were associated with her work as superintendent of the exposition department of the World's WCTU, and of the National WCTU work, of which she was superintendent since 1883, markedly developing the department during the 15 years in which she served as in this position. Temperance restaurants, temperance cafés, temperance bazaars, temperance news-stands, temperance drinks, temperance picture galleries, temperance banners and embellishments of all kinds became a special study with Nichols expert as teacher. She enabled the women in State and county fairs throughout the world to aid in making them places of sobriety. In many cases, they entirely banished the sale of alcohol, either by direct appeal to the managers or by securing the sole privileges of serving refreshments. In all cases, banners and mottoes were displayed, and cards, leaflets, papers and other literature given away, and very often books, cards and pamphlets sold. So general was the satisfaction that several States passed laws prohibiting the sale of intoxicating drinks on or near fair grounds. All that practical work was largely the result of Nichols.

One of the most successful means of extending and illustrating her knowledge on the topic was the way in which she handled her work in the World Cotton Centennial in New Orleans (1884). She obtained favors from the management. She secured from the Louisiana State and national departments the preparation and loan of banners and shields with which to decorate the booth. She made that booth a place of rest and refreshment, furnishing freely the best water to be had on the grounds. She secured the donation and the distribution of immense quantities of temperance literature in languages to suit the foreign visitors. She continued the work the second year.

The WCTU of the State of Indiana made Nichols its president in 1885. The State work thrived under her leadership, although her health was poor for some time.

In 1889, Nichols went as the delegate from the U.S. to the World's WCTU meeting and was superintendent of that department at the Paris Exposition Universelle. She represented 21 countries, and each country sent banners as representatives. Her work at that time gave a great impetus to WCTU organizations, not only in arousing dormant interest, but creating new ones. After her return home to Indianapolis, she wrote a lecture on her "Experiences in Paris" and delivered it many times with accompanying stereopticon views, which were very successful. After her election as World's WCTU superintendent of fairs, she conducted her services at the World's Columbian Exposition in Chicago in 1893.

Nichols secured contributions for the establishment of the Hadley Industrial School for Girls in Hendricks County, Indiana, the work of the school being under the auspices of the Indiana WCTU. With continuing ill health, she was compelled to resign the position of President of the Indiana State WCTU. She continued in the popular lecture field, as well as the special philanthropic field.

At a very early age, Nichols contributed to more than one Southern magazine. Her literary work was translated into many languages and scattered in leaflets all over the world. Some of her lectures were published by the Woman's Temperance Publishing Association.

== Personal life ==
In her youth, she had joined the Methodist church, but while living in Paris, she joined the Protestant Episcopal church, and on coming to Indianapolis, became a member of Christ church, in which she remained until her death. She was presiding officer of the central deanery for years and was president of the woman's auxiliary. As a presiding officer, Nichols was accomplished, and was chosen many times to the office of president. One of the last positions thus held by her was in the Local Council of Women of Indianapolis in 1895–96. She was prominent in Foreign and Home Mission work in her church.

In 1888, she underwent a "remarkable" surgical operation. From this she recovered and continued her work. While in Paris, she casually met an eminent French surgeon, who, upon learning that Nichols was from the U.S. and from Indianapolis, said, "I read some time ago of a remarkable surgical operation that was performed in that city by a Dr. Harvey; it was a very wonderful operation". "Yes," said Mrs. Nichols, "and what is more strange, I am the very person upon whom the operation was made."

Suffering from cancer, she had another surgery in June 1896. Since then, her health was fragile. The last few months of her later life, she was confined her to her home. Josephine Nichols died at Indianapolis, Indiana, April 9, 1897. Burial was at that city's Crown Hill Cemetery.
