= John W. Holtzman =

American politician

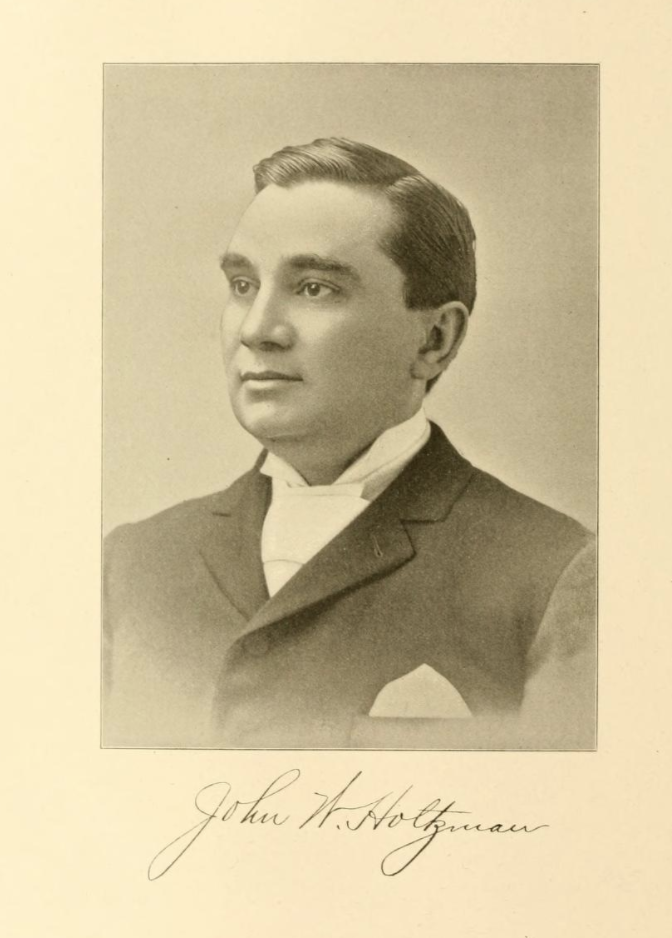
- Born: April 23, 1858; Berks County, Pennsylvania
- Died: March 6, 1942 (aged 83)
- Resting place: Crown Hill Cemetery and Arboretum, Section 29, Lot 74

John W. Holtzman (April 23, 1858 Berks County, Pennsylvania – March 6, 1942) was the 20th mayor of the city of Indianapolis, Indiana. Holtzman first came to Indianapolis in 1883 to read law. He was admitted to the bar in 1885. Holtzman, a Democrat, first ran for mayor in 1903 when he defeated Republican incumbent Charles A. Bookwalter. During the 1905 campaign, the two political rivals met again but Bookwalter prevailed and obtained a second term.
