= Simon Kenton Memorial Bridge =

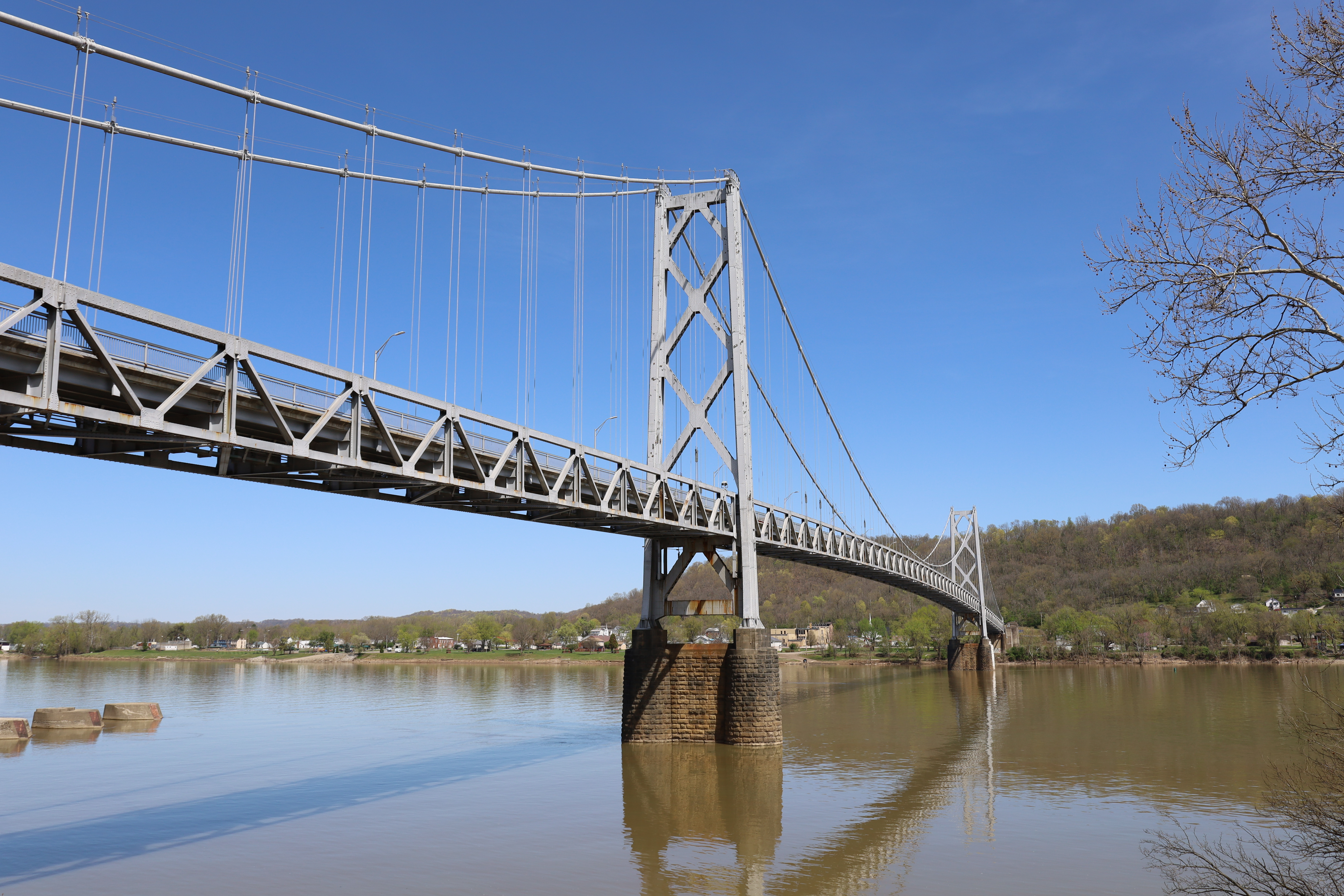
- The bridge in 2023
- Coordinates: 38.649933°N 83.759626°W
- Crosses: Ohio River
- Locale: Maysville, Kentucky and Aberdeen, Ohio
- Maintained by: Kentucky Transportation Cabinet

Characteristics
- Design: Suspension bridge
- Total length: 607 meters (1,991 feet)
- Longest span: 323 meters (1,060 feet)

History
- Construction cost: $1.6 million
- Opened: 1931
- Closed: For traffic over 15-tons

The Simon Kenton Memorial Bridge is a suspension bridge built in 1931 that carries U.S. Route 62 across the Ohio River to connect Maysville, Kentucky with Aberdeen, Ohio. Its main span is 1,060 feet (320 meters) long, and the total length of the bridge is 1,991 feet (607 meters). The bridge was designed by Modjeski and Masters and was open to traffic on November 25, 1931. Tolls were collected from the opening of the bridge until 1945.

The bridge was closed for rehabilitation in 2003 and 2004 after the William H. Harsha Bridge was completed. URS Corp. prepared the rehabilitation plans which consisted of a deck replacement, structural steel repairs, a new inspection walkway, and a new handrail on the main spans. The bridge was painted and returned to its original color, silver. It was rumored that the bridge was painted green during World War II to help "disguise" it from air attacks. National Engineering and Contracting Company completed the construction and painting for the rehabilitation at a cost of $5.7 million.

In July 2019, The Kentucky Transportation Cabinet ordered a 3-ton weight limit placed on the bridge after a routine inspection found significant safety hazards with the cable suspension system. In November 2019, the bridge was closed due to corrosion in the suspension cable connectors. The bridge is expected to be repaired and put back in service by April 15, 2020. As of May 21, 2020, the bridge remained closed after an inspection of the cable repairs determined that the bridge needed rust-proofing.

On June 12, 2020, the bridged reopened for traffic with a 15-ton weight restriction after being closed for nearly 6-months so a short-term fix could be done to reduce stress on 19 damaged and rust coated cables. The bridge is expected to undergo major rehabilitation work in the future, including replacing all cables.

== Gallery ==
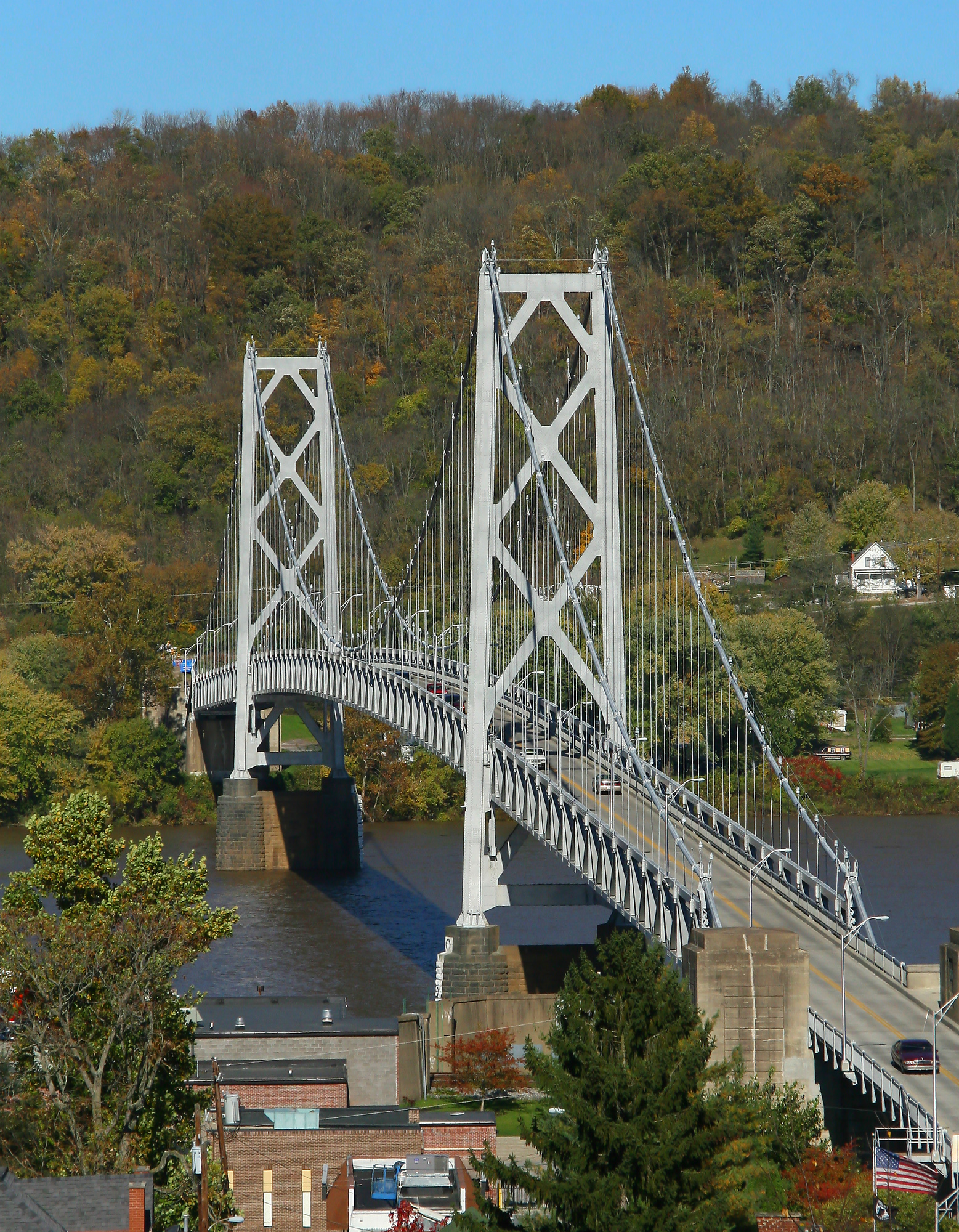
Taken from the Kentucky side in 2006

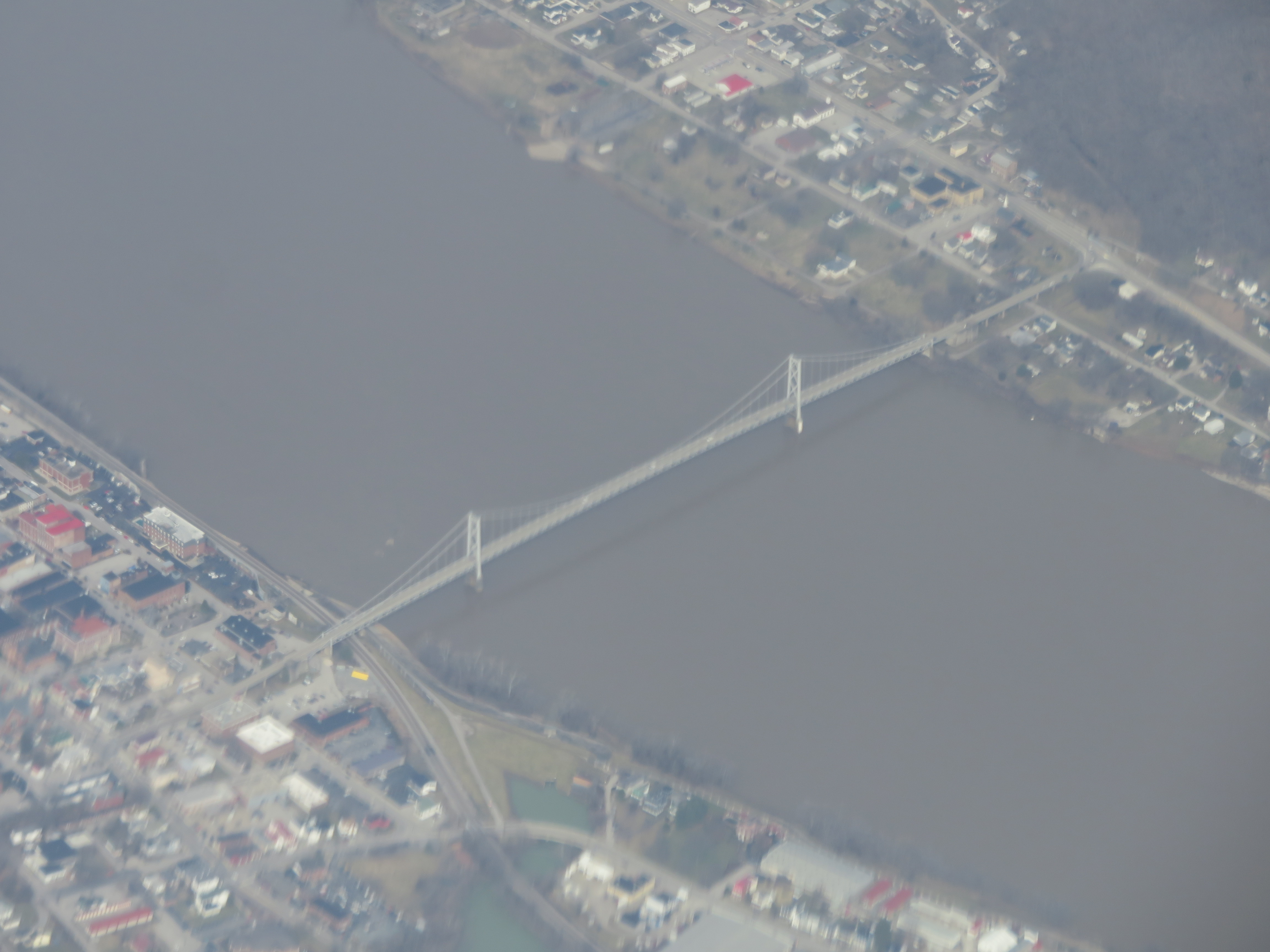
Aerial view in 2019

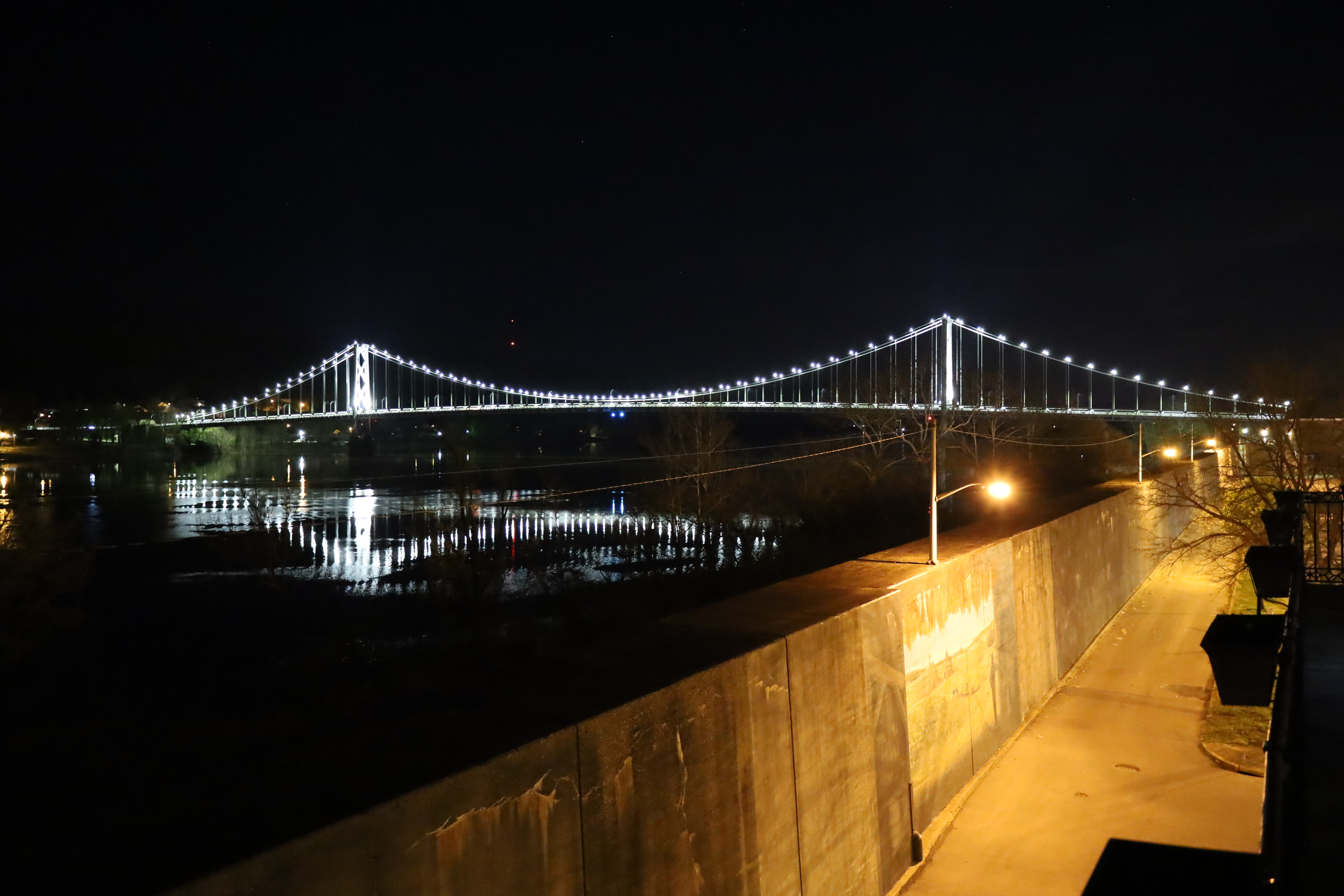
At night in 2023
