= Aberdeen, Ohio =

Village in Brown County, Ohio, US

- Village
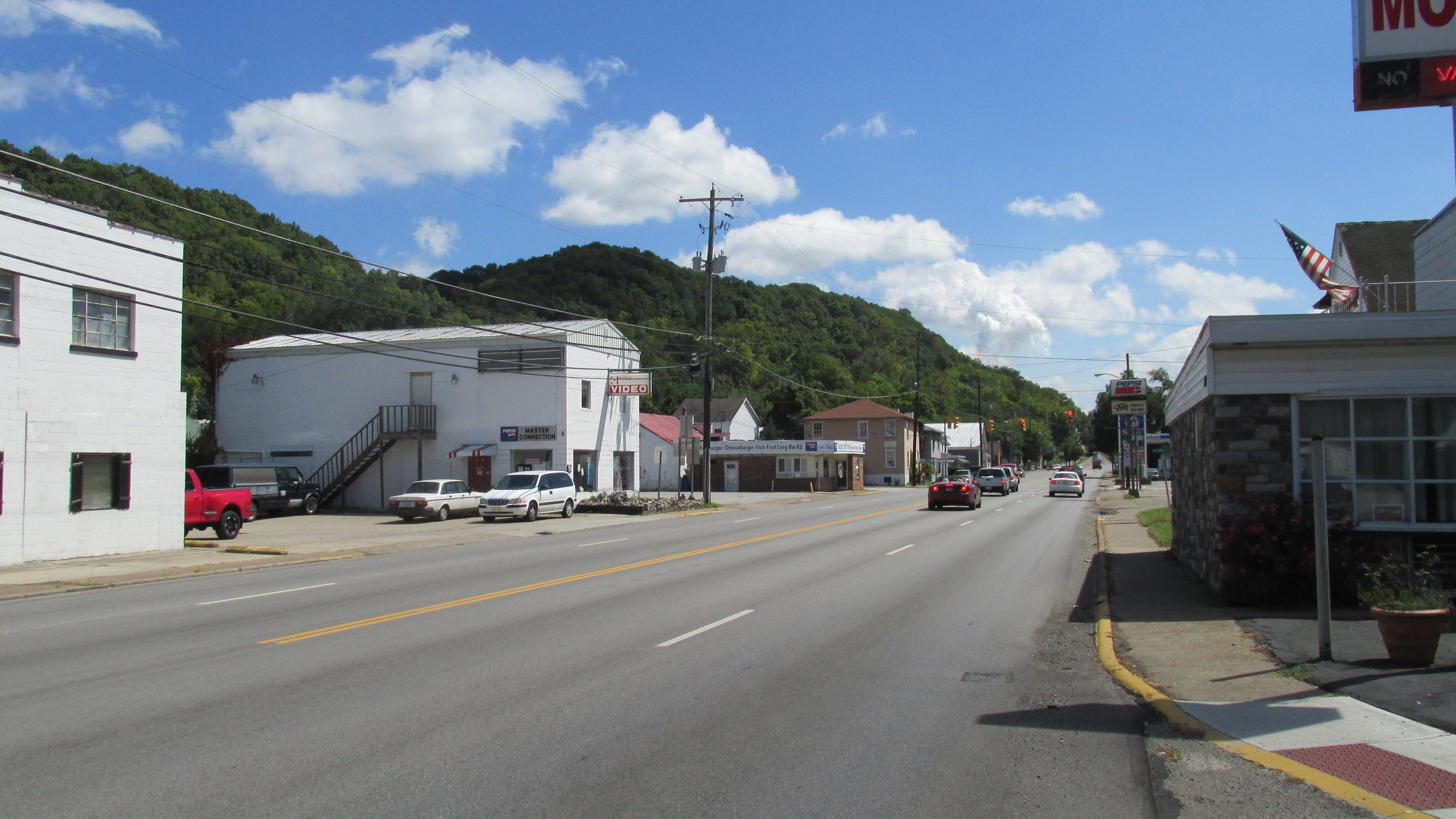
- Looking east on U.S. Route 52 in Aberdeen

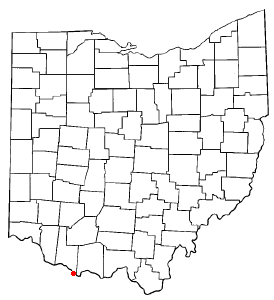
- Location of Aberdeen, Ohio

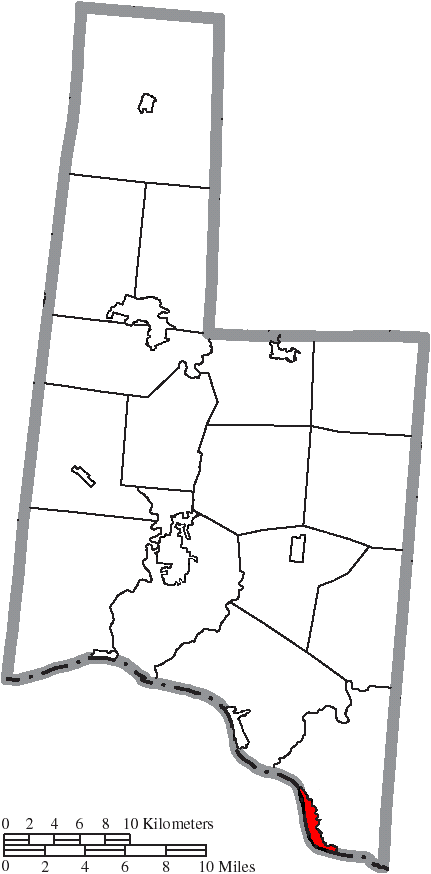
- Location of Aberdeen in Brown County
- Coordinates: 38°39′54″N 83°45′43″W
- Country: United States
- State: Ohio
- County: Brown
- Township: Huntington
- Founded: 1795
- Platted: 1816
- Incorporated: July 5, 1816

Government
  - Mayor: William Eastwood

Area
  - Total: 1.63 sq mi (4.23 km^{2})
  - Land: 1.35 sq mi (3.50 km^{2})
  - Water: 0.29 sq mi (0.74 km^{2})
- Elevation: 535 ft (163 m)

Population (2020)
  - Total: 1,515
  - Estimate (2023): 1,523
  - Density: 1,122.0/sq mi (433.21/km^{2})
- Time zone: UTC-5 (Eastern (EST))
  - Summer (DST): UTC-4 (EDT)
- ZIP code: 45101
- Area codes: 937, 326
- FIPS code: 39-00142
- GNIS ID: 2397905
- Website: thevillageofaberdeenoh.com

Aberdeen is a village in Huntington Township, Brown County, Ohio, United States, along the Ohio River 50 miles (80 km) southeast of Cincinnati. The population was 1,515 at the 2020 census.

== History ==
Aberdeen was founded by James Edwards in 1795 and platted by Nathan Ellis in 1816. It was incorporated on July 5, 1816. It was part of Zane's Trace, a frontier road through the Northwest Territory completed in 1797. Aberdeen is connected to Maysville, Kentucky by the Simon Kenton Memorial Bridge and the William H. Harsha Bridge, a cable-stayed bridge completed in 2001.

== Geography ==
According to the United States Census Bureau, the village has a total area of 1.63 square miles (4.22 km^{2}), of which 1.35 square miles (3.50 km^{2}) is land and 0.28 square miles (0.73 km^{2}) is water.

=== Climate ===
Climate data for Aberdeen
Month	Jan	Feb	Mar	Apr	May	Jun	Jul	Aug	Sep	Oct	Nov	Dec	Year
Mean daily maximum °F (°C)	42.0 (5.6)	44.5 (6.9)	55.2 (12.9)	66.3 (19.1)	76.2 (24.6)	84.4 (29.1)	88.1 (31.2)	86.7 (30.4)	81.2 (27.3)	70.0 (21.1)	56.0 (13.3)	44.8 (7.1)	66.3 (19.1)
Mean daily minimum °F (°C)	22.8 (−5.1)	23.4 (−4.8)	31.7 (−0.2)	40.5 (4.7)	50.1 (10.1)	59.3 (15.2)	63.5 (17.5)	62.2 (16.8)	55.4 (13.0)	43.3 (6.3)	33.6 (0.9)	25.5 (−3.6)	42.6 (5.9)
Average precipitation inches (mm)	3.7 (94)	3.1 (79)	4.3 (110)	3.8 (97)	4.2 (110)	3.9 (99)	4.5 (110)	3.9 (99)	3.2 (81)	2.6 (66)	3.2 (81)	3.6 (91)	43.9 (1,120)
Source: Weatherbase

== Demographics ==
Historical population
Census	Pop.	Note	%±
1820	87		—
1830	165		89.7%
1840	405		145.5%
1850	808		99.5%
1860	836		3.5%
1870	871		4.2%
1880	885		1.6%
1890	874		−1.2%
1900	711		−18.6%
1910	568		−20.1%
1920	477		−16.0%
1930	452		−5.2%
1940	497		10.0%
1950	551		10.9%
1960	774		40.5%
1970	1,165		50.5%
1980	1,566		34.4%
1990	1,329		−15.1%
2000	1,603		20.6%
2010	1,638		2.2%
2020	1,515		−7.5%
2023 (est.)	1,523	▲	0.5%
U.S. Decennial Census

=== 2010 census ===
As of the census of 2010, there were 1,638 people, 760 households, and 454 families living in the village. The population density was 1,213.3 inhabitants per square mile (468.5/km^{2}). There were 882 housing units at an average density of 653.3 per square mile (252.2/km^{2}). The racial makeup of the village was 96.2% White, 1.8% African American, 0.1% Native American, 0.2% Asian, 0.2% from other races, and 1.5% from two or more races. Hispanic or Latino of any race were 0.9% of the population.

There were 760 households, of which 26.3% had children under the age of 18 living with them, 39.3% were married couples living together, 14.5% had a female householder with no husband present, 5.9% had a male householder with no wife present, and 40.3% were non-families. 35.0% of all households were made up of individuals, and 13.7% had someone living alone who was 65 years of age or older. The average household size was 2.16 and the average family size was 2.75.

The median age in the village was 41.9 years. 21.1% of residents were under the age of 18; 9.5% were between the ages of 18 and 24; 24.1% were from 25 to 44; 28.8% were from 45 to 64; and 16.6% were 65 years of age or older. The gender makeup of the village was 46.6% male and 53.4% female.

=== 2000 census ===
As of the census of 2000, there were 1,603 people, 689 households, and 436 families living in the village. The population density was 1,133.8 inhabitants per square mile (437.8/km^{2}). There were 825 housing units at an average density of 583.5 per square mile (225.3/km^{2}). The racial makeup of the village was 96.88% White, 1.37% African American, 0.81% Native American, 0.19% Asian, 0.37% from other races, and 0.37% from two or more races. Hispanic or Latino of any race were 1.25% of the population.

There were 689 households, out of which 32.2% had children under the age of 18 living with them, 44.4% were married couples living together, 15.1% had a female householder with no husband present, and 36.7% were non-families. 31.9% of all households were made up of individuals, and 10.4% had someone living alone who was 65 years of age or older. The average household size was 2.31 and the average family size was 2.88.

In the village, the population was spread out, with 25.8% under the age of 18, 7.8% from 18 to 24, 30.4% from 25 to 44, 24.0% from 45 to 64, and 12.1% who were 65 years of age or older. The median age was 37 years. For every 100 females, there were 86.2 males. For every 100 females age 18 and over, there were 85.4 males.

The median income for a household in the village was $30,202, and the median income for a family was $33,906. Males had a median income of $32,500 versus $23,889 for females. The per capita income for the village was $16,287. About 18.6% of families and 21.9% of the population were below the poverty line, including 31.9% of those under age 18 and 18.3% of those age 65 or over.

== Gallery ==
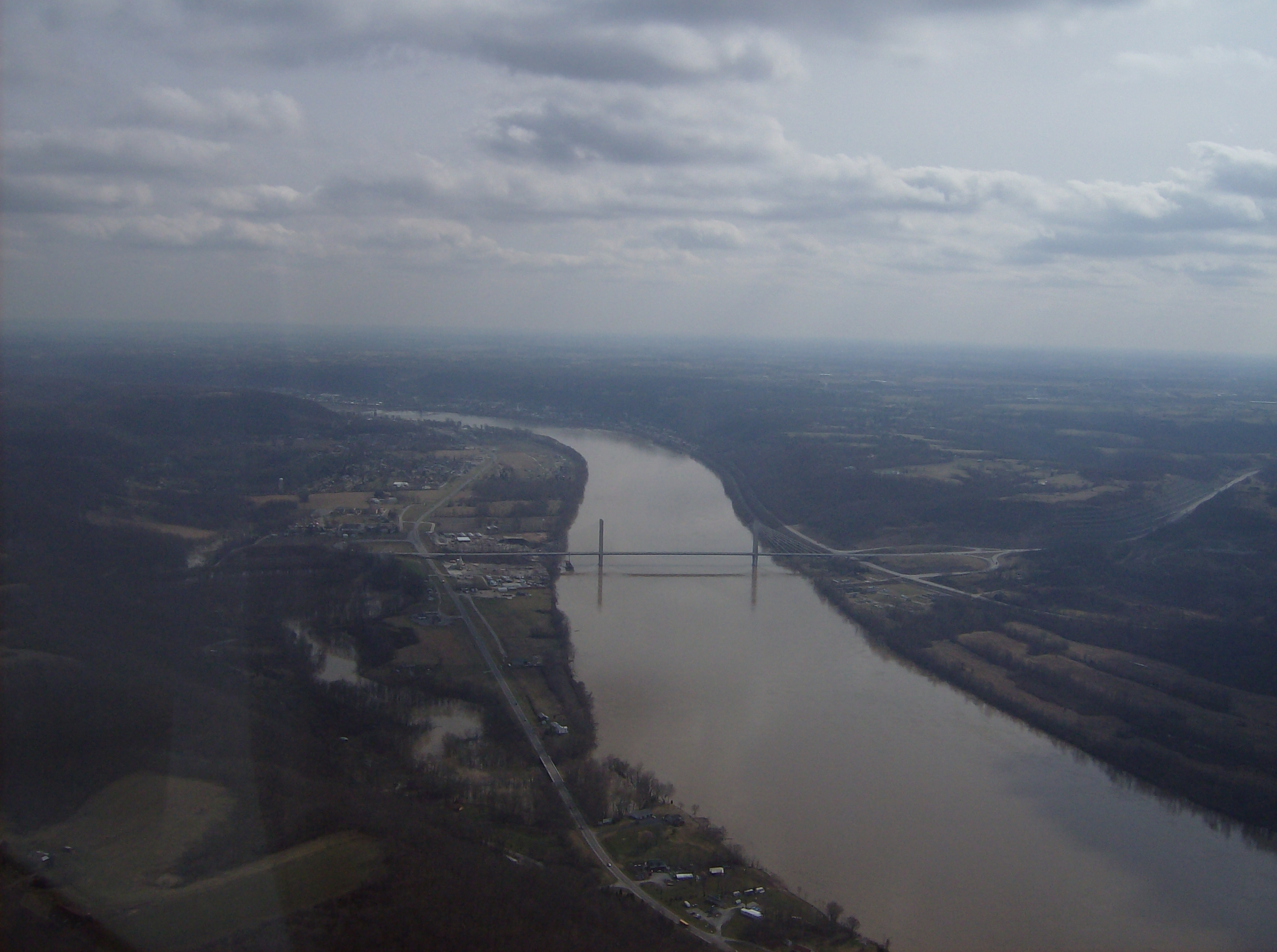
Along the Ohio River at Aberdeen

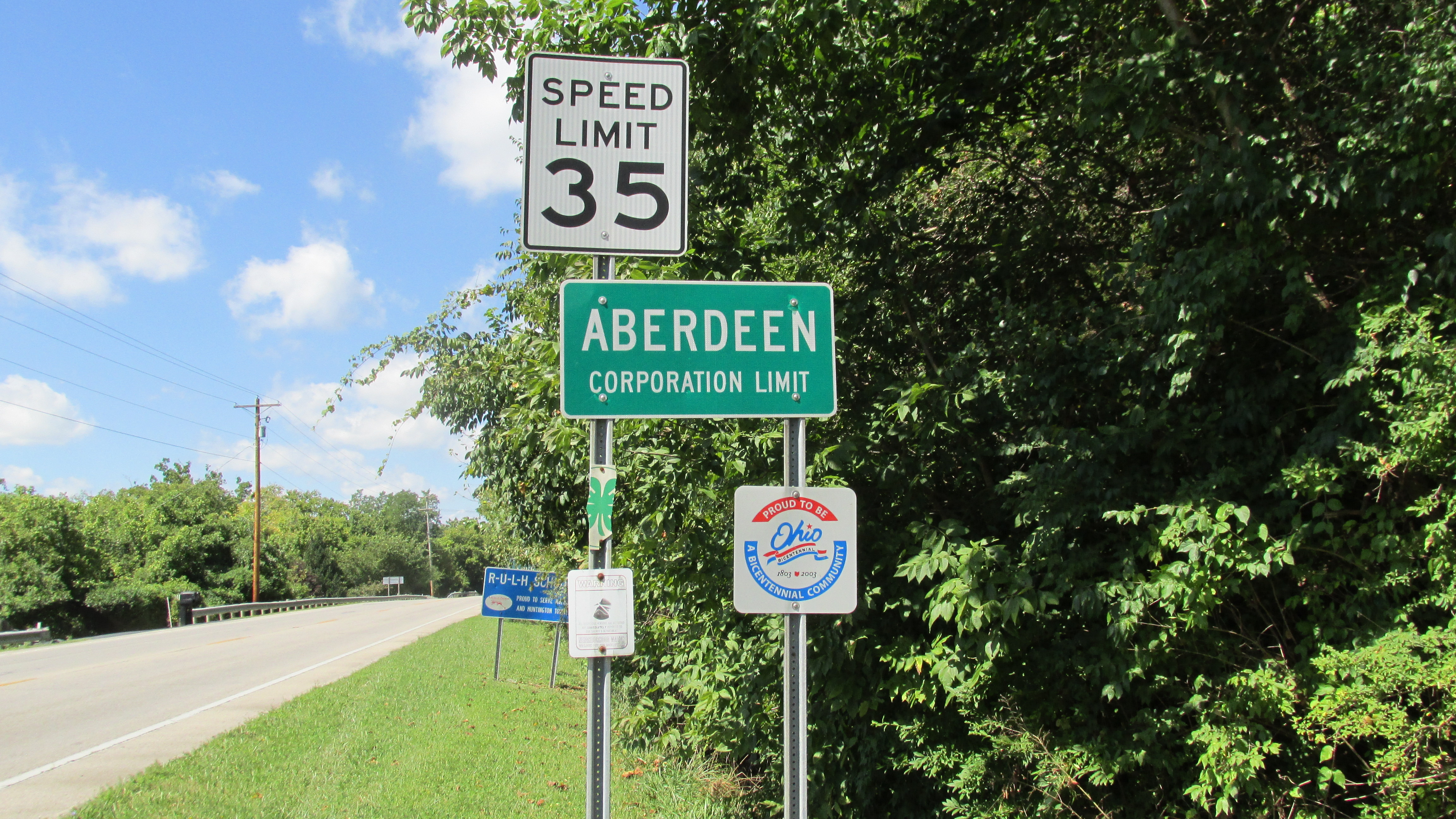
Aberdeen corporation limit sign

== See also ==
- List of cities and towns along the Ohio River
