= Walter Warder =

American politician

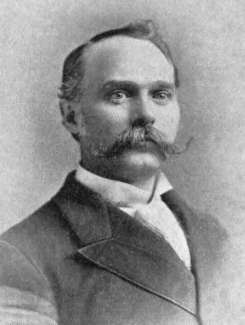

Member of the Illinois Senate
- In office 1897–1901

Member of the Illinois House of Representatives
- In office 1891–1895

Personal details
- Born: April 7, 1851 Maysville, Kentucky, US
- Died: August 17, 1938 (aged 87) Cairo, Illinois, US
- Party: Republican
- Education: Illinois University
- Occupation: Lawyer

Walter Warder (April 7, 1851 – August 17, 1938) was an American lawyer and politician from Illinois.

== Biography ==
Warder was born in Maysville, Kentucky. In 1852, Warder moved with his family to Johnson County, Illinois. He went to Illinois University and taught school. In 1874, Warder was admitted to the Illinois bar and practiced law in Marion, Illinois. In 1880, Warder moved with his wife and family to Cairo, Illinois, where he continued to practice law. In 1883, Warder served as state's attorney and master-in-chancery for Alexander County, Illinois. Warder served in the Illinois House of Representatives from 1891 to 1895 and was a Republican. Warder then served in the Illinois Senate from 1897 to 1901; Warder served as president pro tempore of the Illinois Senate. During the Spanish American War, Warder helped raise a provisional regiment for the United States Army and was commissioned a major. Warder died at his home in Cairo, Illinois.
