= William H. Harsha Bridge =

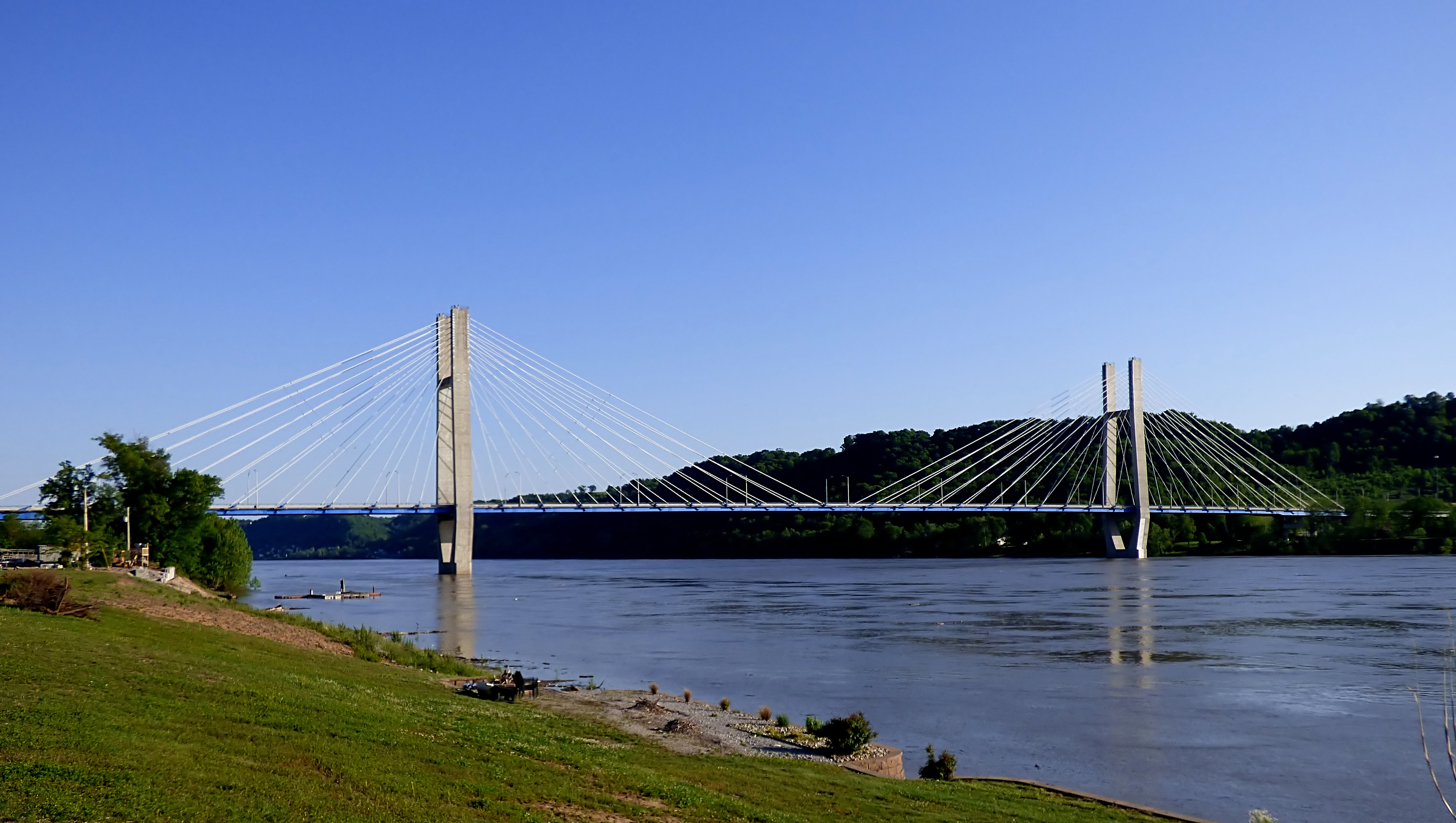
- View facing southeast from Ohio shoreline in 2014
- Coordinates: 38°41′05″N 83°46′55″W
- Carries: United States
- Crosses: Ohio River
- Locale: Maysville, Kentucky, and Aberdeen, Ohio
- Maintained by: Kentucky Transportation Cabinet

Characteristics
- Design: cable-stayed bridge
- Total length: 2,100 feet (640 m)
- Longest span: 1,050 feet (320 meters)

History
- Construction start: 1997
- Opened: 2000

The William H. Harsha Bridge is a cable-stayed bridge carrying U.S. Route 68 that connects Maysville, Kentucky, and Aberdeen, Ohio, over the Ohio River. It is named for William Harsha, who represented the Ohio portion of the area in the United States House of Representatives. Construction on the bridge started in 1997 and it opened in 2000. The bridge has a main span of 1,050 feet (320 meters) and a total span of 2,100 feet (640 m). The Simon Kenton Bridge, a suspension bridge built in 1932, is located nearby.

== See also ==
- List of crossings of the Ohio River
