= Maysville, Kentucky =

- City
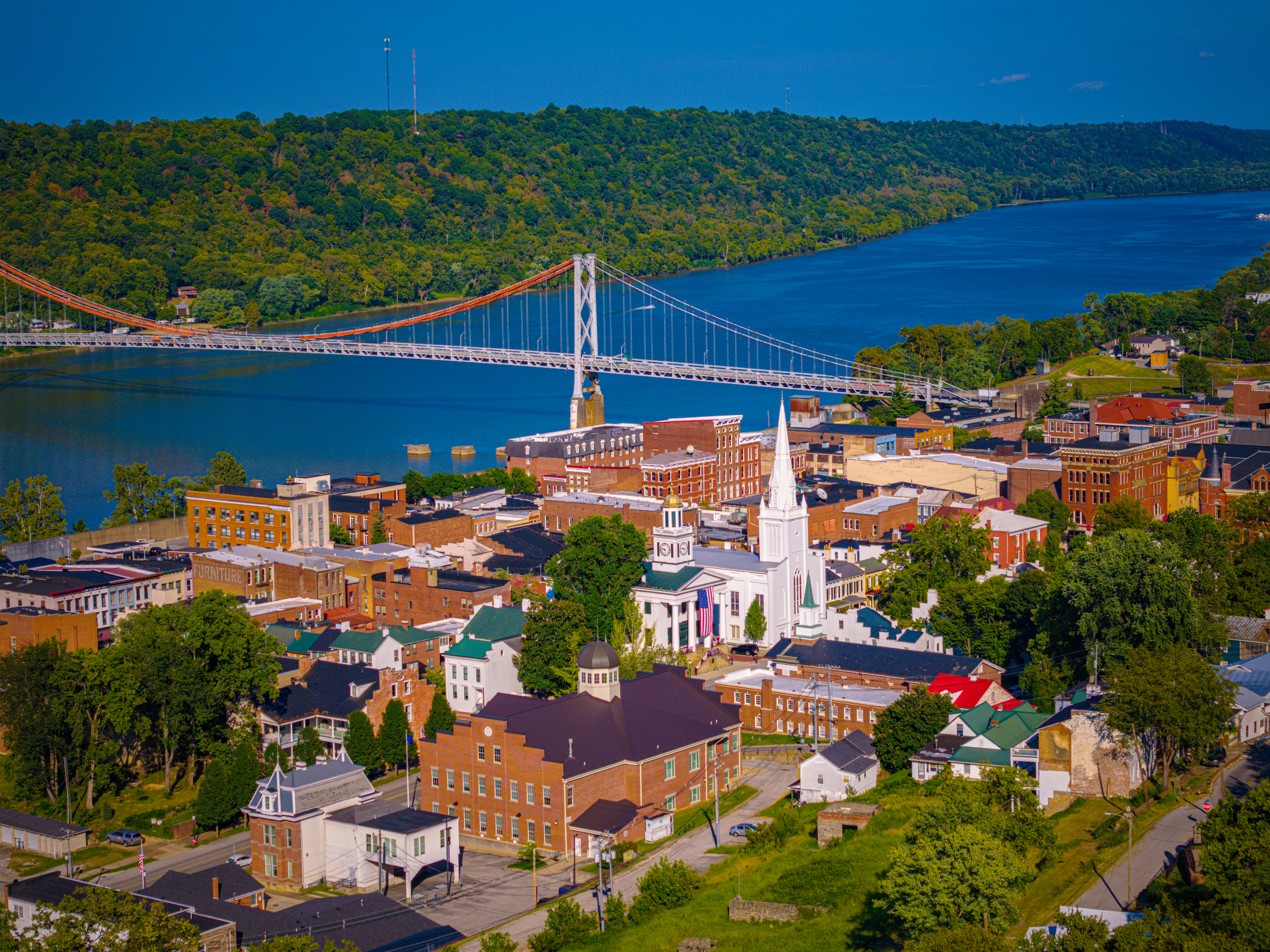
- Maysville skyline showing the Mason County courthouse and the Simon Kenton Memorial Bridge over the Ohio River

- Flag

- Location in Mason County, Kentucky
- Coordinates: 38°38′38″N 83°46′33″W
- Country: United States
- State: Kentucky
- County: Mason

Government
  - Mayor: Debra L Cotterill

Area
  - Total: 21.35 sq mi (55.30 km^{2})
  - Land: 18.97 sq mi (49.14 km^{2})
  - Water: 2.38 sq mi (6.16 km^{2})
- Elevation: 827 ft (252 m)

Population (2020)
  - Total: 8,873
  - Estimate (2022): 8,742
  - Density: 467.6/sq mi (180.56/km^{2})
- Time zone: UTC−5 (Eastern (EST))
  - Summer (DST): UTC−4 (EDT)
- ZIP Codes: 41056, 41096
- Area code: 606
- FIPS code: 21-51024
- GNIS feature ID: 2405043
- Website: www.cityofmaysvilleky.gov

Maysville is a home rule-class city in Mason County, Kentucky, United States, and is the county seat of Mason County. The population was 8,873 as of the 2020 census. Maysville is on the Ohio River, 66 miles (106 km) northeast of Lexington. Two bridges cross the Ohio from Maysville to Aberdeen, Ohio: the Simon Kenton Memorial Bridge built in 1931 and the William H. Harsha Bridge built in 2001.

On the edge of the outer Bluegrass Region, Maysville is historically important in Kentucky's settlement. Frontiersmen Simon Kenton and Daniel Boone are among the city's founders. Later, Maysville became an important port on the Ohio River for the northeastern part of the state. It exported bourbon whiskey, hemp and tobacco, the latter two produced mainly by African American slaves before the Civil War. It was once a center of wrought iron manufacture, sending ironwork downriver to decorate the buildings of Cincinnati, Ohio, and New Orleans, Louisiana. Other small manufacturers also located early in Maysville, and manufacturing remains an important part of the modern economy. Under the leadership of Henry Means Walker, Maysville was home to one of the largest tobacco auction warehouses in the world for most of the 20th century.

Maysville was an important stop on the Underground Railroad, as the free state of Ohio was just across the river. Abolitionist author Harriet Beecher Stowe visited the area in 1833 and watched a slave auction in front of the court house in Washington, the original seat of the county and now a historic district of Maysville. She included the scene in her influential novel Uncle Tom's Cabin, published in 1852.

== History ==
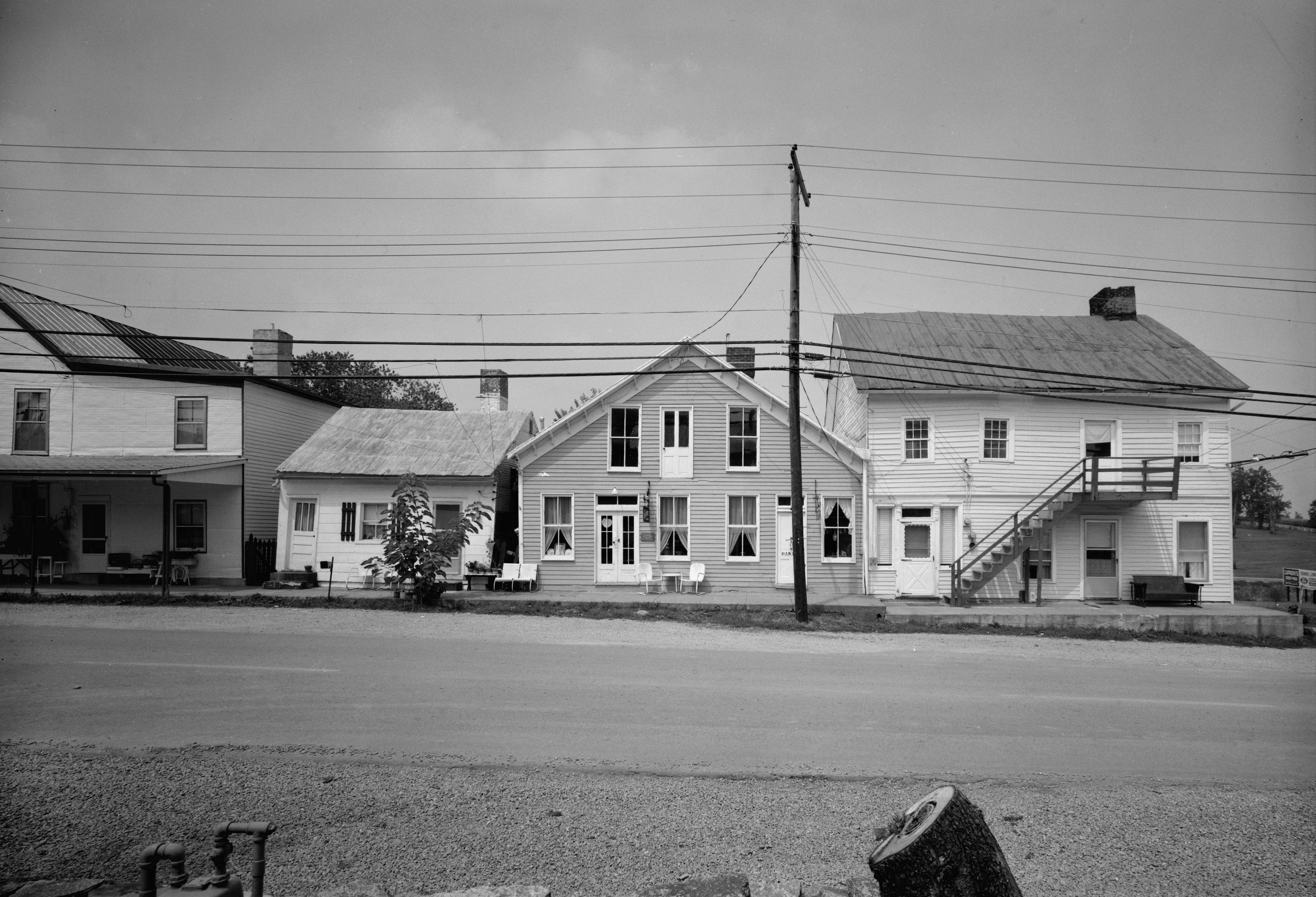
Buildings in the Washington Historic District

=== Early settlement ===
Buffalo once forded the Ohio here, beating a broad path into the interior of Kentucky in search of salt licks. For thousands of years, various cultures of indigenous peoples inhabited the area, hunting the buffalo and other game. In the 17th century, the powerful Iroquois Confederacy, based in present-day New York state, drove out other tribes to hold the Ohio Valley as a hunting ground.

European-American settlers traveling down the Ohio in the 18th century and early 19th century found a natural harbor at Limestone Creek. The buffalo trace, also a well-used trail traveled for centuries by Native Americans, was a natural path into the bluegrass region, extending all the way to Lexington, Kentucky. Frontiersman Simon Kenton made the first settlement in the area in 1775, but temporarily abandoned that to fight in the western battles of the American Revolution. Returning in 1784, Kenton built a blockhouse at the site of Maysville and founded Kenton's Station (frontier fort) at a site 3 miles (5 km) inland. Kenton met new settlers at Limestone, as the landing place was called, and escorted them inland to his station. In 1786 the village which grew up near Kenton's Station was established by act of the Virginia General Assembly as the town of Washington. By this time, John May had acquired the land at Limestone and Daniel Boone established a trading post and tavern there. In 1787 the little settlement was incorporated as Maysville, though the name "Limestone" persisted well into the 19th century.

=== Growth ===
View of Maysville, 1821

In 1788, when Mason County was organized and Washington was named its county seat, Maysville was still a primitive site of warehouses and wharves, with few dwellings. From 1795, after the conclusion of the Northwest Indian War reduced the likelihood of Indian attacks from across the Ohio, Maysville began to flourish. Zane's Trace, a road from Wheeling, Virginia (now West Virginia), to the bank of the Ohio River opposite Maysville, was completed in 1797 and stimulated ferry traffic across the river. By 1807, Maysville was one of two principal ports in Kentucky; it was still mostly a place through which goods and people passed, having only about sixty dwellings. In 1811, the first steamboat came down the Ohio from Pittsburgh, Pennsylvania, passing Maysville on its way to New Orleans. With the coming of the steamboat, Maysville's population and area expanded rapidly.

=== Maysville Road ===
Southwest from Maysville, the road followed the former buffalo trace and Native American trail to Lexington. It was called both the Maysville Road and the Limestone Road. It was maintained by the various counties through which it passed with local labor from the county levies. The road was rough and during certain seasons practically impassable.

In 1829, the Kentucky legislature authorized the Maysville, Washington, Paris, and Lexington Turnpike Road Company to construct a modern roadway along the route of the old Limestone Road. Users would be charged fees for maintenance and paying off the debt to shareholders. The act set aside blocks of shares for purchase by the federal government. Henry Clay, an influential Kentucky politician and proponent of the American System, argued for the Maysville Road and other infrastructure, noting it would be part of a longer road terminating in New Orleans, Louisiana, and proper for federal funding.

In 1830, Congress passed a bill authorizing the federal government to purchase shares in the turnpike company. President Andrew Jackson, a bitter rival of Clay, vetoed the bill, arguing that the project was of purely local benefit. The Maysville Road veto was one of Jackson's first acts in aligning the federal government with his principles of Jacksonian democracy.

An attempt to override Jackson's veto failed, but the controversy over the Maysville Road veto continued for some time. The turnpike was completed in 1835 with funding from local entities and private investment. It was the first macadamized road in the state. Today it is U.S. Route 68.

=== County seat ===
By the 1830s, Maysville had a population of 3,000 and was the second-most important commercial city in Kentucky after Louisville. Washington, the county seat, had dwindled in importance after a fire in 1825 and a series of deadly cholera epidemics. A proposal to move the county government from Washington to Maysville was bitterly fought but passed by a slender margin in 1848. Maysville donated its city hall, completed in 1846, to the county for a court house. Today, much of Washington is designated as a historic district, the Washington Historic District; it is listed on the National Register of Historic Places.

In 1850, the Maysville & Lexington Railroad began operation, but it failed within the decade. Successor companies maintained the connection until 1921 when they were bought out by the L&N. Today, the Maysville & Lexington's former routes and rights-of-way are owned by CSX Transportation.

== Landmarks ==
=== Simon Kenton Memorial Bridge ===
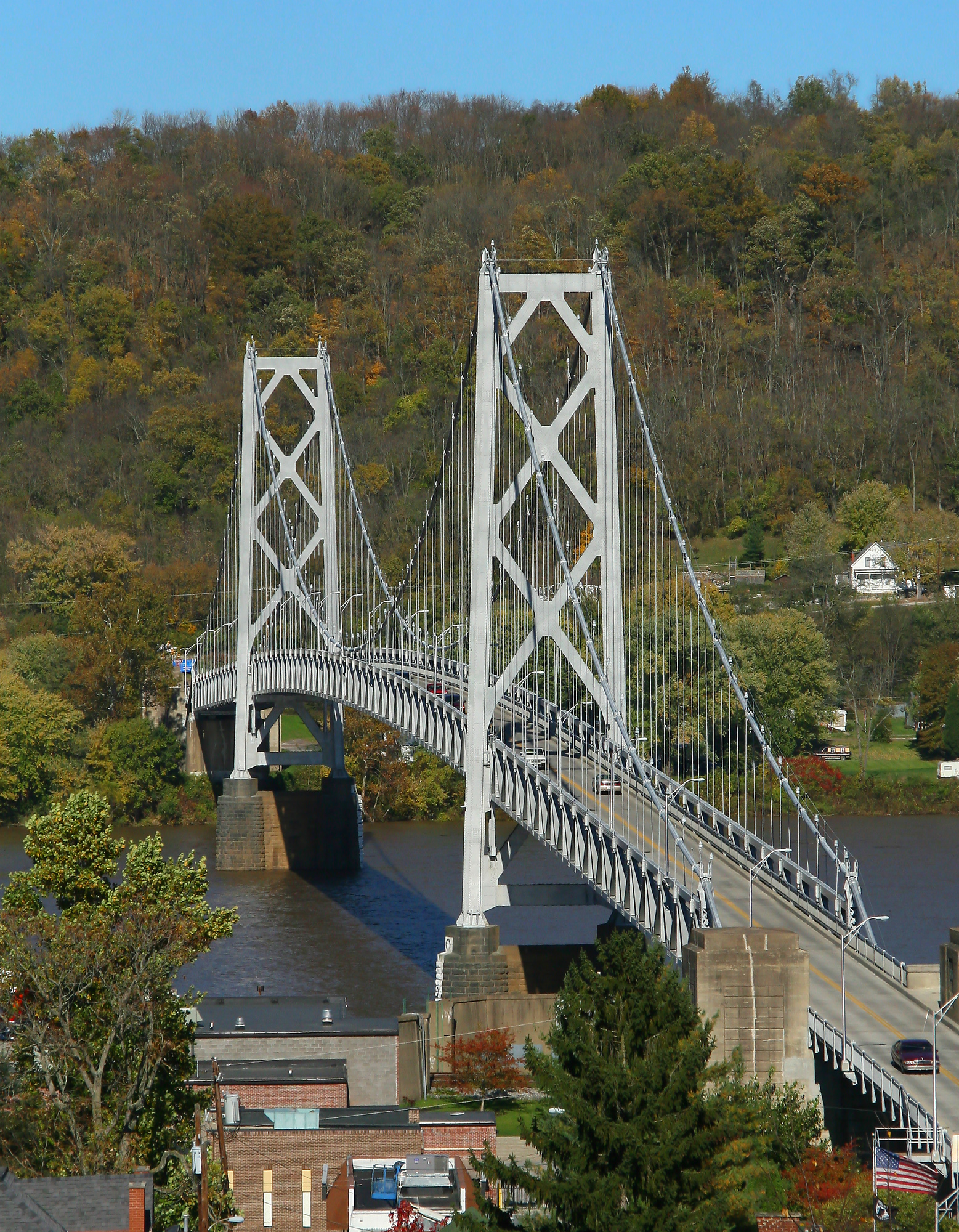
Simon Kenton Memorial Bridge

The Simon Kenton Memorial Bridge is a suspension bridge built in 1931 crossing the Ohio River and originally opened with a toll. Those tolls were removed in 1945 to much fanfare - including celebrations from the local Rotary and Lions club, and a parade in downtown Maysville. Its main span is 323 meters (1,060 feet) long, and the total length of the bridge is 607 meters (1,991 feet). It connects Maysville with Aberdeen, Ohio. It is currently in use and is not slated for demolition, as the bridge was closed for refurbishment in 2001 after the William H. Harsha Bridge was completed.

The Simon Kenton Suspension Bridge opened to traffic at 10:30 AM on November 25, 1931, at a cost of $1.6 million (~$27.2 million in 2025). In 2002, a $5.8 million renovation job replaced the deck of the Ohio River crossing. A fresh coat of battleship gray paint was also applied.

=== Russell Theatre ===
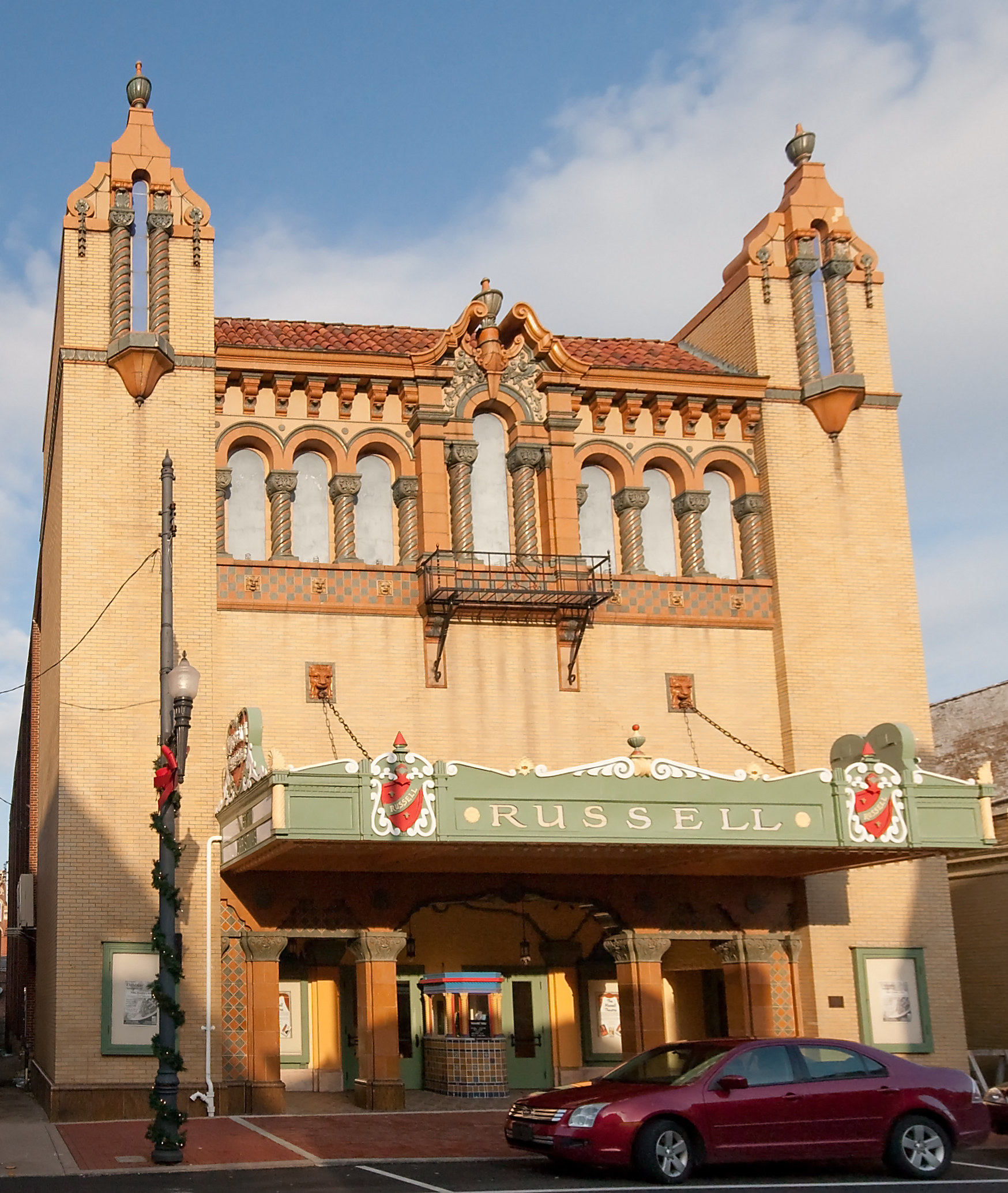
Russell Theater

The Russell Theatre, located on Third Street in Maysville, was the site of the world premiere of Rosemary Clooney's first film, The Stars Are Singing, in 1953. The Russell Theatre is an atmospheric theatre, and featured a large rainbow that would light up before and after the showing of each movie. The theatre is now undergoing the second phase of a restoration project that began in 2008. Organizers plan to revive the Russell as a movie and film venue, with emphasis on themed movie marathons, classics, documentaries, art films and other movies not available at mainstream cinemas.

=== Maysville Murals ===
Native American bison hunt mural

In the summer of 1998, a series of historical murals was begun on the downtown floodwall. Over the next ten years, Robert Dafford and his team painted ten murals exploring the history of Maysville on various sections of the floodwall.

- 17th century River Valley Hunting Grounds – A Native American bison hunt on the buffalo trace.
- 18th century Limestone Landing – The initial settlement of European-Americans on the future site of Maysville, then known as Limestone Landing.
- Marquis de Lafayette – The 1825 visit of the Marquis de Lafayette to the city, where the city fathers had literally rolled out the red carpet.
- 1850s Sutton's Landing – The antebellum-era Maysville riverfront, featuring iconic steam boats on the Ohio River.
- Underground Railroad 1850s – The Underground Railroad route through the area before the American Civil War, with a view looking across the river to the John Rankin House in Ripley, Ohio.
- 20th century Maysville Riverfront – The continuing evolution of the waterfront location as steamboats gave way to trains and barge traffic.
- Market Street – A main street in early 20th century downtown, with a bandstand in the middle of the street.
- Germantown Fair – Held since 1854, the fair featured a wooden grandstand and livestock shows.
- Tobacco barn – A major part of the local agricultural economy, the mural depicts the life of the plant from the field to the harvest to storage in local barns.
- Rosemary Clooney – The last mural, painted in September 2007, honors moments from the life of Rosemary Clooney. The mural highlights her lifelong friendship with Blanche Chambers, the 1953 premier of The Stars are Singing and her singing career. It was painted by Dafford, Herb Roe and Brett Chigoy. Her brother Nick Clooney spoke during the dedication for the mural, explaining various images to the crowd.

== Demographics ==
Historical population
Census	Pop.	Note	%±
1800	137		—
1810	335		144.5%
1830	2,040		—
1840	2,741		34.4%
1850	3,840		40.1%
1860	3,499		−8.9%
1870	4,705		34.5%
1880	5,220		10.9%
1890	5,358		2.6%
1900	6,423		19.9%
1910	6,141		−4.4%
1920	6,107		−0.6%
1930	6,557		7.4%
1940	6,572		0.2%
1950	8,632		31.3%
1960	8,484		−1.7%
1970	7,411		−12.6%
1980	7,983		7.7%
1990	7,169		−10.2%
2000	8,993		25.4%
2010	9,011		0.2%
2020	8,873		−1.5%
2024 (est.)	8,711		−1.8%
U.S. Decennial Census

=== 2020 census ===
In the 2020 census, Maysville had a population of 8,873. The median age was 42.6 years. 21.8% of residents were under the age of 18 and 20.9% of residents were 65 years of age or older. For every 100 females there were 91.3 males, and for every 100 females age 18 and over there were 85.7 males age 18 and over.

89.4% of residents lived in urban areas, while 10.6% lived in rural areas.

There were 3,920 households in Maysville, of which 27.2% had children under the age of 18 living in them. Of all households, 36.2% were married-couple households, 19.1% were households with a male householder and no spouse or partner present, and 36.1% were households with a female householder and no spouse or partner present. About 36.6% of all households were made up of individuals and 17.0% had someone living alone who was 65 years of age or older.

There were 4,516 housing units, of which 13.2% were vacant. The homeowner vacancy rate was 2.6% and the rental vacancy rate was 9.3%.

Racial composition as of the 2020 census
Race	Number	Percent
White	7,196	81.1%
Black or African American	869	9.8%
American Indian and Alaska Native	33	0.4%
Asian	82	0.9%
Native Hawaiian and Other Pacific Islander	0	0.0%
Some other race	101	1.1%
Two or more races	592	6.7%
Hispanic or Latino (of any race)	218	2.5%

=== 2000 census ===
As of the census of 2000, there were 7,323 people, 3,856 households, and 2,406 families residing in the city. The population density was 451.6 inhabitants per square mile (174.4/km^{2}). There were 4,416 housing units at an average density of 221.8 per square mile (85.6/km^{2}). The racial makeup of the city was 86.00% White, 11.54% African American, 0.14% Native American, 0.60% Asian, 0.03% Pacific Islander, 0.50% from other races, and 1.18% from two or more races. Hispanic or Latino of any race were 0.86% of the population. There were 3,856 households, out of which 27.8% had children under the age of 18 living with them, 45.5% were married couples living together, 14.0% had a female householder with no husband present, and 37.6% were non-families. 33.7% of all households were made up of individuals, and 16.7% had someone living alone who was 65 years of age or older. The average household size was 2.25 and the average family size was 2.85. In the city, the population was spread out, with 22.7% under the age of 18, 8.1% from 18 to 24, 26.6% from 25 to 44, 23.5% from 45 to 64, and 19.1% who were 65 years of age or older. The median age was 40 years. For every 100 females, there were 85.9 males. For every 100 females age 18 and over, there were 80.7 males. The median income for a household in the city was $27,813, and the median income for a family was $37,684. Males had a median income of $31,975 versus $20,775 for females. The per capita income for the city was $16,836. About 14.4% of families and 18.9% of the population were below the poverty line, including 27.1% of those under age 18 and 16.2% of those age 65 or over.

=== Metropolitan area ===
Maysville was the principal city of the Maysville Micropolitan Statistical Area, which is no longer recognized by the Census Bureau after a 2023 change of definitions. It was part of the Cincinnati-Wilmington-Maysville Combined Statistical Area. The micropolitan area encompassed only Mason County and previously included Lewis County until a 2013 change of definitions.

== Economy ==
=== Meta Mason County Campus ===
In October 2026, it was revealed that Meta, parent company of Facebook and WhatsApp, has purchased more than 2,000 acres for a massive data center campus. This is envisioned to be a long-term, five-phase development plan, starting with local infrastructure planning and development.

== Geography ==
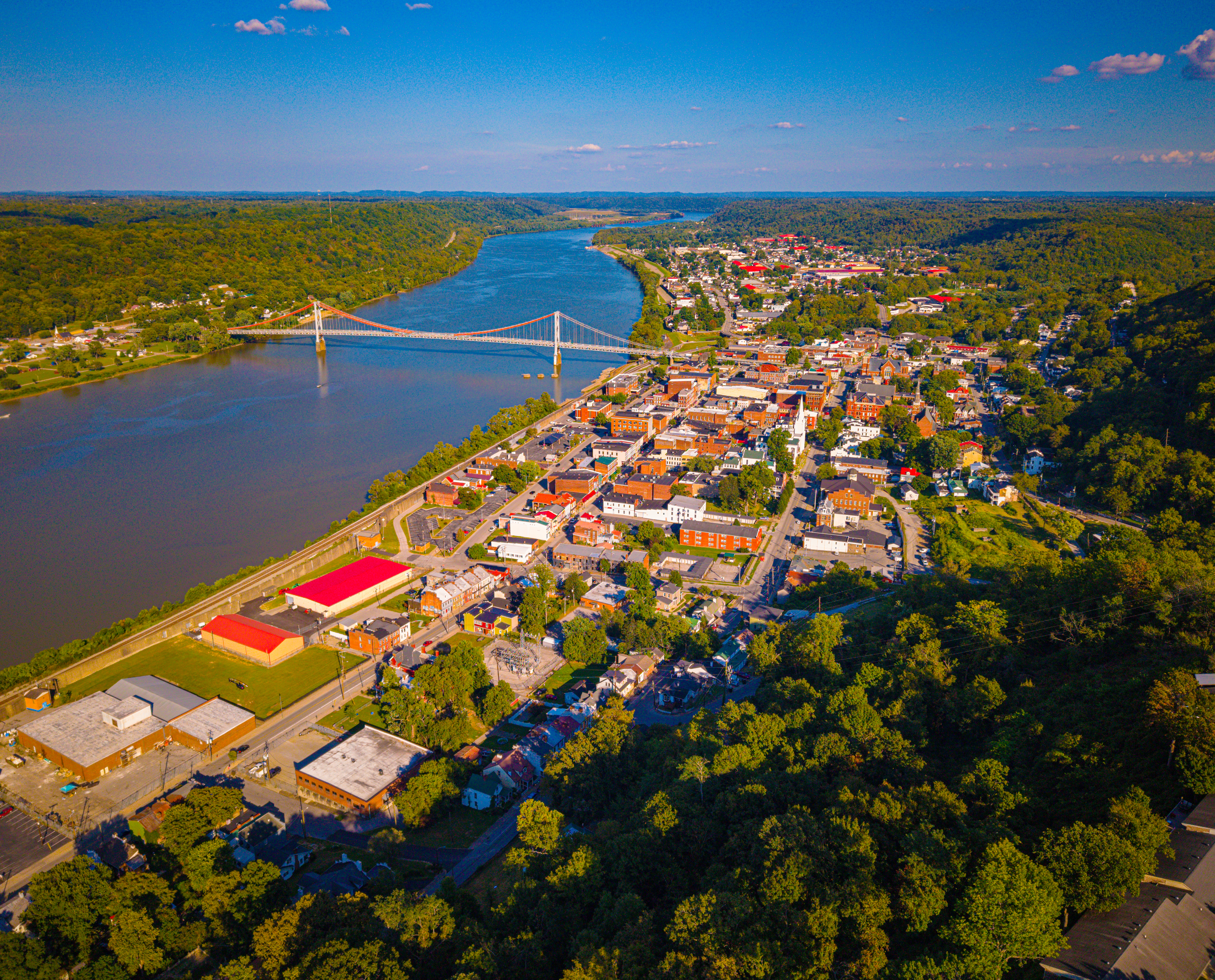
Maysville in September 2026

Maysville is located on the Ohio River at the mouth of Limestone Creek. It occupies the narrow river plain and the steep hills rising from it, giving the city the prospect of an Italian hill town. The city now extends inland to the former town of Washington, which was annexed by Maysville in 1990. The city has a total area of 21.35 square miles (55.3 km^{2}), of which 18.97 square miles (49.1 km^{2}) are land and 2.38 square miles (6.2 km^{2}), or 11.13%, are water. Maysville is at Ohio River mile marker 408.7, and is 100 miles (160 km) downriver from Huntington, West Virginia, and 62 miles (100 km) upriver from Cincinnati, Ohio.

== Climate ==
Maysville lies on the border of the Humid subtropical and the Hot Summer Continental climate zones. Maysville's average yearly precipitation is 46.02", falling primarily as rain or snow. Maysville's average yearly temperature is 54.4 °F, with the coolest lows averaging 22.2 °F in January, and highs averaging 87 °F in July.

Climate data for Maysville, Kentucky (Maysville Wastewater Treatment Plant) (1991–2020 normals, extremes 1896–present)
Month	Jan	Feb	Mar	Apr	May	Jun	Jul	Aug	Sep	Oct	Nov	Dec	Year
Record high °F (°C)	80 (27)	79 (26)	89 (32)	94 (34)	100 (38)	105 (41)	108 (42)	105 (41)	103 (39)	95 (35)	84 (29)	78 (26)	108 (42)
Mean maximum °F (°C)	64.0 (17.8)	67.4 (19.7)	75.0 (23.9)	82.4 (28.0)	87.4 (30.8)	92.6 (33.7)	94.6 (34.8)	93.8 (34.3)	92.0 (33.3)	84.0 (28.9)	73.8 (23.2)	65.3 (18.5)	96.0 (35.6)
Mean daily maximum °F (°C)	41.2 (5.1)	45.1 (7.3)	54.6 (12.6)	66.8 (19.3)	75.4 (24.1)	83.4 (28.6)	86.8 (30.4)	86.0 (30.0)	80.7 (27.1)	68.8 (20.4)	55.9 (13.3)	45.3 (7.4)	65.8 (18.8)
Daily mean °F (°C)	32.0 (0.0)	34.8 (1.6)	43.0 (6.1)	53.7 (12.1)	63.4 (17.4)	72.0 (22.2)	75.9 (24.4)	74.8 (23.8)	68.7 (20.4)	56.9 (13.8)	44.8 (7.1)	36.5 (2.5)	54.7 (12.6)
Mean daily minimum °F (°C)	22.8 (−5.1)	24.4 (−4.2)	31.3 (−0.4)	40.7 (4.8)	51.4 (10.8)	60.6 (15.9)	65.1 (18.4)	63.6 (17.6)	56.7 (13.7)	44.9 (7.2)	33.8 (1.0)	27.7 (−2.4)	43.6 (6.4)
Mean minimum °F (°C)	4.3 (−15.4)	8.0 (−13.3)	17.9 (−7.8)	26.2 (−3.2)	38.0 (3.3)	48.7 (9.3)	56.0 (13.3)	54.4 (12.4)	43.9 (6.6)	32.3 (0.2)	20.6 (−6.3)	12.9 (−10.6)	1.0 (−17.2)
Record low °F (°C)	−25 (−32)	−22 (−30)	0 (−18)	11 (−12)	27 (−3)	37 (3)	46 (8)	39 (4)	29 (−2)	15 (−9)	−1 (−18)	−20 (−29)	−25 (−32)
Average precipitation inches (mm)	3.64 (92)	3.40 (86)	4.74 (120)	4.66 (118)	5.05 (128)	4.35 (110)	5.04 (128)	3.36 (85)	3.52 (89)	3.27 (83)	3.19 (81)	4.10 (104)	48.32 (1,227)
Average precipitation days (≥ 0.01 in)	12.4	10.6	12.3	12.9	14.0	11.5	9.8	8.4	8.0	8.8	10.5	12.1	131.3
Source: NOAA

== Education ==
Mason County Schools operates public schools.

Schools:

- Mason County High School
- Mason County Middle School
- Mason County Intermediate School
- Straub Elementary School

Private:

- Saint Patrick School (Private School)

In 1990 the Maysville Independent School District merged into the Mason County school district.

Maysville has a lending library, the Mason County Public Library.

== Media ==
From 1887 to 1905, Maysville was home to The Evening Bulletin, a newspaper published by Rosser & McCarthy.

The Ledger Independent is the local newspaper and is published five days a week. WFTM-AM and WFTM-FM are the primary local radio stations in Maysville. The AM station is a CBS Sports Radio affiliate, and the FM plays adult contemporary music.

The annual Rosemary Clooney Music Festival was founded by the singer in 1999 to benefit the restoration of the Russell Theatre. Past performers at the festival include Debby Boone, Rita Coolidge, Michael Feinstein, Roberta Flack, Alison Krauss, The Pointer Sisters, Michael Bolton, and Linda Ronstadt.

== Transportation ==
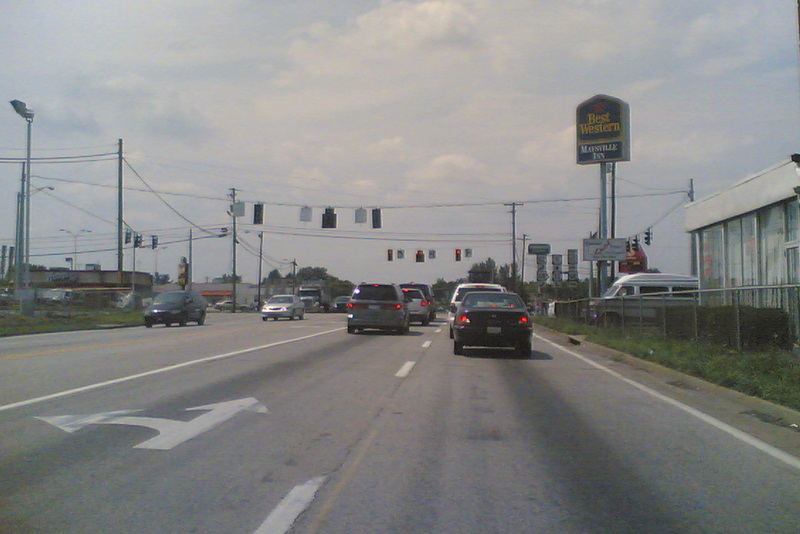
The KY 9/KY 10 intersection with U.S. 62 & U.S. 68 in Maysville

=== Rail transportation ===
Amtrak, the national passenger rail system, provides service to Maysville with the thrice-weekly Cardinal.

=== Mass transit ===
Maysville City Transit provides fixed-route and demand-ride bus service throughout city of Maysville. The system is made up of a single fixed route that operates daily, running once an hour from 6:00 AM – 6:00 PM. The city has been running the system since 1960.

=== Highways ===
The following highways serve Maysville:

- U.S. Route 68, which connects downtown Maysville with Aberdeen, Ohio, via the Simon Kenton Memorial Bridge.
- U.S. Route 62, which passes just west of Maysville and links Kentucky and Ohio via the William H. Harsha Bridge.

US 62 and 68 also provide Maysville with a direct route to Lexington and the Bluegrass Region of Central Kentucky.

Other highways serving Maysville are:

- Kentucky Route 8, which follows the Ohio River west of Maysville to the greater Cincinnati area
- Kentucky Route 9
- Kentucky Route 10

Routes 9 and 10 run concurrently through the south edge of Maysville as the AA Highway. The AA Highway links the Kentucky suburbs of Cincinnati approximately 50 miles west of Maysville with Vanceburg, Ashland and Interstate 64 near Grayson to the southeast.

- Kentucky Route 11, a north–south highway that approaches Maysville from the south from Flemingsburg and Mt. Sterling.

The fact that highways numbered 8, 9, 10, and 11 serve Maysville makes the city one of the few towns located at the intersection of four consecutively numbered highways.

== Notable people ==
- Luther Atwood, chemist in the oil industry
- Henry Wadsworth Stage and Film actor. Appeared in 22 movies including The Thin Man in 1934. USN in WWII. Graduated from Maysville HS in 1921. Graduate of University of KY. Died in NYC in 1974. Buried in Maysville Cemetery
- Ted Berry, first African-American mayor of Cincinnati
- Thornton Blackburn, former slave whose case in the Canadian Courts established the principle that Canada would not return slaves to their masters and thus was the safe terminus of the Underground Railroad
- Nick Clooney, journalist and TV host (brother of Rosemary Clooney, father of George Clooney)
- Rosemary Clooney, popular singer and actress
- John J. Collins, Roman Catholic bishop
- John S. Darrough, Civil War soldier and Medal of Honor recipient
- Alexander Doniphan, general and attorney known for saving the life of Joseph Smith, founder of the Latter Day Saint movement
- Edward Gallenstein, long-serving president of the National Wood Carvers Association
- Alison Lundergan Grimes, Secretary of State of Kentucky
- J. Fred Helf, composer
- Heather French Henry, Miss America 2000
- Francis T. Hord, Indiana Attorney General
- Oscar B. Hord, Indiana Attorney General
- Albert Sidney Johnston, Confederate general and leading general in the Texas War of Independence
- Chris Lofton, professional and collegiate basketball player
- Jerry Lundergan, member of the Kentucky House of Representatives, chairman of the Kentucky Democratic Party
- Ed McClanahan, writer
- George McCulloch, congressman from Pennsylvania
- Darius Miller, professional basketball player, NCAA Div. 1 National Champion
- William "Bull" Nelson, U.S. Army general
- Josephine R. Nichols, lecturer, temperance reformer
- Barbara Paul, novelist
- Elijah Phister, congressman from Kentucky
- Stanley Forman Reed, U.S. Supreme Court justice
- Nelson Stacy, race car driver - ARCA Champion and multi NASCAR race winner
- Mary Lee Tate, painter and teacher
- Dave Tomlin, professional baseball player
- William H. Wadsworth, congressman from Kentucky
- Walter Warder, Illinois state legislator and lawyer
- Augustus E. Willson, governor of Kentucky
- Brigadier General Charles Young, U.S. Army officer, first African-American officer to become a colonel

== See also ==
- Maysville Community and Technical College
- St. Patrick's High School (Maysville, Kentucky)
- List of cities and towns along the Ohio River
- Mays Lick, Kentucky
