= Indiana AIDS Memorial =

Memorial in Indianapolis, Indiana, US

- Interactive map of Indiana AIDS Memorial
- Location: Indianapolis, Indiana, United States
- Coordinates: 39°49′16.3″N 86°10′34.5″W
- Type: Sculpture
- Opening date: October 29, 2000

The Indiana AIDS Memorial is installed in Crown Hill Cemetery in Indianapolis, Indiana, United States. Originally dedicated on October 29, 2000, it is the country's first permanent AIDS memorial in a cemetery and second overall. According to the Indiana Historical Society, the memorial honors AIDS victims who died during 1982–1999. Inscribed on two limestone tablets at the memorial are the names of over one hundred Indiana residents or natives who have died from AIDS.

The memorial was rededicated in 2017. In 2023, new railings were dedicated in honor of Gary "Allen" Whitehead.
