= Holcomb Mausoleum Door =

- Artist: Amick & Wearley Monuments
- Year: 1953
- Dimensions: 200 cm × 10 cm × 99 cm (78 in × 4 in × 39 in)
- Location: Indianapolis, Indiana, United States; 39°48′59″N 86°10′13″W
- Owner: Crown Hill Cemetery

Holcomb Mausoleum Door is a public artwork by American fabricator Amick & Wearley Monuments, located in Crown Hill Cemetery, which is near downtown Indianapolis, Indiana, United States. Holcomb Mausoleum Door is bronze and glass and is approximately 78 x 39 x 4 inches. The door features a full-length female figure, seen from behind. The figure is portrayed wearing a draping dress, with the proper left shoulder bare. The background of the door consists of stalks, also in bronze, with the figure's proper right hand raised toward the stalks, and her proper left hand placed on the door handle. The figure is looking downward, over her right shoulder.

An inscription on the memorial includes (on mausoleum, above door:) JAMES.IRVING.HOLCOMB. (On two bronze ventilation grates in the rear of the memorial:) ERECTED BY WEARLY MONUMENTS/MUNCIE-HARTFORD CITY-RICHMOND INDIANA.

The door is part of a memorial for James Irving Holcomb, an Indianapolis industrialist and a Vice President of the Butler University board of trustees who donated funds towards the construction of an observatory for the university's centennial celebration in 1953.

== See also ==
- Holcomb Observatory and Planetarium
