= Crown Hill National Cemetery =

Historic veterans cemetery in Indianapolis, Indiana, US

- U.S. National Register of Historic Places
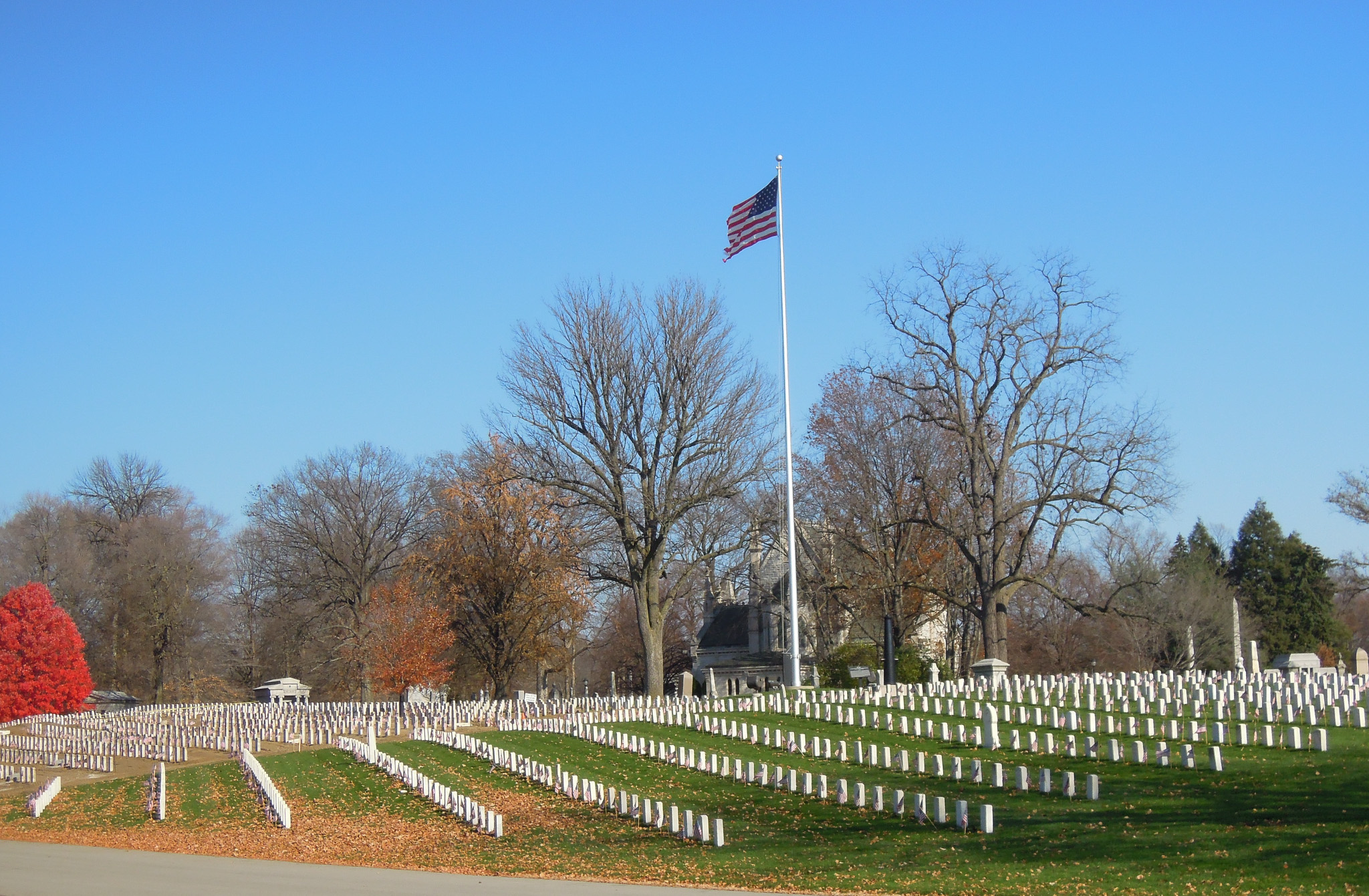
- Gravestones in the cemetery (2012).

- Location within Indianapolis Location within Indiana Location within the United States
- Location: Indianapolis, Indiana
- Coordinates: 39°49′02″N 86°10′22″W
- Built: 1866
- MPS: Civil War Era National Cemeteries MPS
- NRHP reference No.: 99000486
- Added to NRHP: April 29, 1999

Crown Hill National Cemetery is a U.S. National Cemetery located in Indianapolis, Indiana. It was established in 1866 on Section 10 within Crown Hill Cemetery, a privately owned cemetery on the city's northwest side. Administered by the United States Department of Veterans Affairs, the National Cemetery encompasses 1.4 acres (0.57 ha) and serves as a burial site for Union soldiers who fought in the American Civil War.

Indianapolis did not have a cemetery specifically designated as a burial ground for Union soldiers until the National Cemetery was established at Crown Hill. Soldiers who died at Indianapolis were initially buried at the city's Greenlawn Cemetery. The remains of the first Union soldier from Greenlawn were interred at the National Cemetery at Crown Hill on October 19, 1866. By November 1866 the bodies of 707 soldiers had been moved from Greenlawn to Crown Hill. The first burial of a Union veteran in the National Cemetery took place on October 7, 1869. The last Union veteran burial in Crown Hill's National Cemetery took place on November 16, 1898. As of December 31, 1998, the National Cemetery had 795 interments.

The National Cemetery contains individually marked graves and commemorative memorials, including a stone monument that was dedicated on May 30, 1889. Three bronze plaques installed on the National Cemetery's grounds provide verses from Theodore O'Hara's "Bivouac of the Dead". Another plaque is inscribed with text of the federal Act, approved in 1864, that establishes and protects the National Cemeteries. Crown Hill Cemetery, including the military cemetery, was listed on the National Register of Historic Places on February 28, 1973. A separate listing for the Crown Hill was added to the National Register on April 29, 1999. The last Union veteran burial in Crown Hill's National Cemetery took place on November 16, 1898. The National Cemetery at Crown Hill is managed by the Marion National Cemetery.

== History ==
Indianapolis had no cemetery specifically designated as a burial place for Union soldiers who died in camps and hospitals near Indianapolis until after the Civil War. During the war, when the city served as a major transportation hub and as a camp for Union troops, the soldiers who died at Indianapolis were initially buried at Greenlawn Cemetery, located west of town. Confederate prisoners who died at Camp Morton, a large prisoner-of-war camp north of Indianapolis, were also interred at Greenlawn. By August 1863 Greenlawn was nearing capacity from wartime casualties and facing encroachment from industrial development. To provide additional land for burials, a group of local businessmen formed a Board of Corporators (trustees) who established Crown Hill Cemetery on October 22, 1863. The privately owned cemetery, northwest of downtown, borders present-day Thirty-Eighth Street. In 1866 the U.S. government authorized a National Cemetery for Indianapolis and made arrangements for the removal of the soldiers from Greenlawn.

The National Cemetery in Indianapolis was established on 1.4 acres (0.57 ha) within the grounds of Crown Hill. Brigadier General James A. Ekin, a representative of the federal government, and Oliver P. Morton, the governor of Indiana, are credited with selecting its location on the western half of a sloping hill. This area is also known as Section 10. Crown Hill's board of corporators made an initial offer to donate land valued at $15,000 for the cemetery, but Ekin did not have the authority to purchase the site. In the final agreement the land was purchased for $5,000, with the understanding that Crown Hill's ownership would ornament the burial plots.

Within a few months the bodies of Union soldiers who were buried at Greenlawn were moved to the National Cemetery. On October 19, 1866, the remains of Matthew Quigley, a former member of Company A, Thirteenth Regiment, became the first of several hundred Union soldiers from Greenlawn to be interred at Crown Hill. By November 1866, the bodies of 707 soldiers had been moved from Greenlawn to Crown Hill and buried in regulation-sized coffins measuring 7 feet (2.1 m) by 20 inches (510 mm) by 17 inches (430 mm) and spaced 2 feet (0.61 m) apart. Not all the Civil War soldiers buried at Crown Hill's National Cemetery are from Indiana. The National Cemetery also contains the remains of thirty-six unknowns.

On May 30, 1868, Crown Hill, along with Arlington National Cemetery and 182 others in twenty-seven states, took part the country's first Memorial Day ceremonies. An estimated crowd of 10,000 attended the celebrations at Crown Hill, which began an annual tradition that continues into the twenty-first century.

On October 7, 1869, John F. Wilson, a former private in Company E, 70th Regiment Indiana Infantry, became the first Union veteran of the Civil War to be buried in the National Cemetery. Eighty-five others were buried in the remaining plots in Section 10. The last burial of a Civil War soldier in Crown Hill's National Cemetery took place on November 16, 1898, when John H. Tull, a former private in Company D, 72nd Regiment Indiana Infantry, was buried in Section 10.

In 1889 the federal government requested an expansion of the National Cemetery grounds for veteran burials. Crown Hill's board suggested an adjacent section southwest of Section 10, but the government took no action to acquire it. On June 27, 1899, Crown Hill's board passed a resolution that allowed members of Grand Army of the Republic posts in Indianapolis who served in the U.S. army or navy to be buried in Section 9, adjacent to the National Cemetery. The body of Brigadier General Edward Richard Sprigg Canby rests in a place of honor in Section 9, Lot 1. Other notable Civil War veterans buried within view of the Union dead in the National Cemetery include Union General Jefferson C. Davis, buried in Section 29, Lot 1, and Brigadier General Abel Streight, buried in Section 29, Lot 72.

On October 27, 1969, Major Robert W. Hayes of the 774th Tactical Airlift, was killed when his plane exploded over Chu Lai, in what was then South Vietnam. He is interred in Section 10, the final burial in Crown Hill's National Cemetery. As of December 31, 1998, the National Cemetery includes 795 burial sites. Crown Hill Cemetery, including the National Cemetery, was listed on the National Register of Historic Places on February 28, 1973. The National Cemetery portion, which is listed separately, was added to the National Register on April 29, 1999.

== Confederate soldiers' burials ==
In addition to the Union soldiers who are buried in the National Cemetery, Crown Hill is also a burial site for Confederate prisoners of war who died at Camp Morton, a large camp located north of Indianapolis. In 1931 industrial development around Greenlawn Cemetery required the bodies of the Confederate prisoners to be moved to Crown Hill, where they were interred in a mass grave, known as Confederate Mound in Section 32 at Crown Hill. In 1993 a Confederate Memorial, with ten bronze plaques listing the names of the 1616 Confederate soldiers and sailors who died at Camp Morton, was erected to mark the grave.

== Artworks ==
There are many artworks on the property, some of which are freestanding, but most are associated with gravesites. The National Cemetery contains a few memorials in addition to the individually marked graves. The Major Robert Anderson Women's Relief Corps Number 44, Auxiliary to Post Number 360, Grand Army of the Republic, Department of Indiana, erected a stone monument that was dedicated on May 30, 1889. The monument, which was created by Indianapolis stonecutter James F. Needler, is located near the south end of the National Cemetery. The inscription on its north face reads: "In memory of the unknown dead who fell in our country's service in the War of the Union, A.D. 1861–1865, No name to bid us know, Who rests below, No work of death of birth, Only the grasses wave, Over a mound of earth, Over a nameless grave". Two additional monuments, each one made of cast-iron artillery on a concrete base, are installed within the National Cemetery. Three bronze plaques installed on the National Cemetery grounds provide verses from Theodore O'Hara's "Bivouac of the Dead". Another plaque is inscribed with the text of Section 3 of the federal Act, approved on February 22, 1864, that establishes and protects the National Cemeteries. A flagpole was installed at the north end of Section 10 in 1938.

== See also ==
- United States National Cemetery System
- National Register of Historic Places listings in Center Township, Marion County, Indiana
