= James Cooley (disambiguation) =

James Cooley (1926–2016) was an American mathematician.

James Cooley may also refer to:

- James Cooley (diplomat), U.S. Ambassador to Peru (1826–1828)
- James E. Cooley (1802–1882), New York City bookseller, auctioneer and politician
- Mesita (musical project), by James Cooley

== See also ==
- James C. Field (James Cooley Field), American photographer
- James Cooley Fletcher (1823–1901), missionary
