= Calvin Fletcher =

American judge (1798–1866)

Member of the Indiana Senate from the Hamilton, Hendricks, Madison and Marion Counties district
- In office 1826–1828
- Preceded by: James Gregory

Member of the Indiana Senate from the Hamilton, Hancock, Hendricks, Madison and Marion Counties district
- In office 1829 – January 26, 1833
- Succeeded by: Alexander B. Morrison

Personal details
- Born: February 4, 1798 Ludlow, Vermont, US
- Died: May 26, 1866 (aged 68) Indianapolis, Indiana, US
- Resting place: Crown Hill Cemetery and Arboretum Section 79, Lot 9; 39.8207577°N 86.174892°W
- Party: anti-Jackson, Whig, Fusion, Republican
- Spouse(s): Sarah Hill (d. 1854; 11 children); Mrs. Keziah Rice Lister
- Occupation: attorney, banker, farmer

Calvin Fletcher (February 4, 1798 – May 26, 1866) was an American attorney who became a prominent banker, farmer and state senator in Indianapolis, Indiana. In 1821 Fletcher moved from Vermont via Ohio to the new settlement of Indianapolis, where he made his financial fortune. In addition to his business interests, Fletcher was involved in Indianapolis's educational and civic development. After his death, one of his farms (Wood Lawn) was developed into an early Indianapolis neighborhood, and Fletcher Place is now a nationally recognized historic district.

Fletcher's diary, published as The Diary of Calvin Fletcher in nine volumes by the Indiana Historical Society between 1972 and 1983, describes a wide range of topics as well as Fletcher's personal interests, acquaintances, and community activities.

== Early life and education ==
Fletcher was born on February 4, 1798, in Ludlow, Vermont, the eleventh child of Jesse and Lucy Keyes Fletcher's fifteen children. Fletcher's father, a poor man with a large family to support, still managed to provide his children with a basic education. Young Fletcher attended local schools until the age of sixteen and worked on the family farm. With his father's permission, Fletcher left home in 1815 at the age of seventeen. Fletcher went to Windsor on the Connecticut River, where he worked on several local farms before moving to Royalton and later to Randolph, Vermont, to attend school and work. Fletcher returned home for a brief time then moved to Westford, Massachusetts, to attend school.

In 1817, after completing his education at Westford, Fletcher once again set out on his own. With no particular destination in mind, Fletcher traveled south through Connecticut to New York City and Philadelphia, then west through Pennsylvania to Wheeling. Fletcher ended up in Urbana, Ohio, in 1817, where he taught school, studied law under James Cooley (who would become the first American charge d' affairs in Peru), and was admitted to the Ohio bar in 1820.

== Marriage and family ==
Fletcher married Sara Hill on May 1, 1821, in Urbana and they moved to Indianapolis in 1821. Arriving in the small settlement nearly penniless, Fletcher became a wealthy lawyer, banker, and landowner. He and his wife had eleven children: two daughters (Maria and Lucy) and nine sons (James Cooley, Elijah T., Calvin Jr., Miles J., Stoughton A., Ingram, William B., Stephen Keyes, and Albert. His eldest son, James Cooley Fletcher, became a Presbyterian minister and missionary. Sarah Hill Fletcher died on September 27, 1854.

Calvin Fletcher Jr. was married to Civil War nurse Emily Beeler Fletcher, born November 20, 1828, outside of Indianapolis to Joseph Beeler and Hannah Matthews-Beeler. Her grandfather, George Matthews, was the first settler on White Lake Creek in Morgan County in 1820. During the Civil War, in 1863, she was asked by Governor Oliver P. Morton to go the front to care for the sick and wounded that were unable to be brought North. She worked in the Nashville and Murfreesboro hospitals, and was a founder and board member of the Indianapolis Home for Aged Women, founded in 1867 to care for transient women. She died in 1910 of nephritis.

On November 4, 1855, Fletcher married his second wife, Keziah Price Lister from Hallowell, Maine, who had come to Indianapolis in 1851 to become a public school teacher. Lister, whose first husband had deserted her and moved to Texas, obtained a divorce and then married Fletcher. In 1855 Fletcher moved his children and second wife into the Alfred Harrison home on North Pennsylvania Street in Indianapolis, leaving the Wood Lawn house to his son, Miles, and his family.

== Career ==
=== Law, government, and politics ===
Fletcher began his law practice in Urbana, Ohio, and became the first attorney practicing law in Indianapolis. He was prosecutor for the Marion County Circuit Court in 1822 and 1823 and a prosecuting attorney for the Fifth Circuit Court in 1825 and 1826. Fletcher formed a law firm with Ovid Butler, Simon Yandes, and Horatio C. Newcomb. On December 26, 1846, Fletcher and Butler dissolved their law practice and collection business, and Fletcher focused on his farming operations and banking interests.

In 1825, voters in Marion County (surrounding Indianapolis) and several surrounding counties elected Fletcher as their state senator. He won re-election to the part-time position and remained in office until resigning in 1833. This was the only elected office Fletcher ever held, aside from his stint as the Marion County prosecutor. Alexander B. Morrison, a veteran of the Black Hawk War who at various times published the Indiana Democrat and Indiana State Sentinel in Indianapolis (and the Indiana Statesman in Charlestown, Indiana, in 1830) won the election to become his successor.

Fletcher was a member of the state sinking fund Commission from 1834 to 1841. He was affiliated with the anti-Jackson and Whig parties. Initially a member of the Free Soil Party, Fletcher was a member of the party's state committee and served as its convention chairman in 1849. In the 1850s Fletcher was a member of the Fusion party and then became active in promoting the Republican Party ticket in the 1856 state and national elections. In 1860 Fletcher supported the Republicans in state elections and Abraham Lincoln's presidential campaign.

=== Banking and railroad interests ===
In 1844 Fletcher helped organize the State Bank of Indiana, in which he acted as the Indianapolis branch's director from 1841 to 1844 and as branch president from 1843 to 1858. He remained active in banking for the rest of his life. In 1857 Fletcher was an organizer of the Indianapolis Branch Banking Company. In 1863 he joined his son Stoughton, his brother Stoughton, and fellow bankers Thomas H. Sharpe and Francis M. Churchman in organizing the Indianapolis National Bank, which was the second national bank in Indianapolis.

Fletcher was a stockholder in the Indianapolis and Bellefontaine Railroad as well as a board member, and served briefly as its board president in 1855. Shortly before his death, Fletcher made a public appearance in support of a proposed Indianapolis-Vincennes railroad.

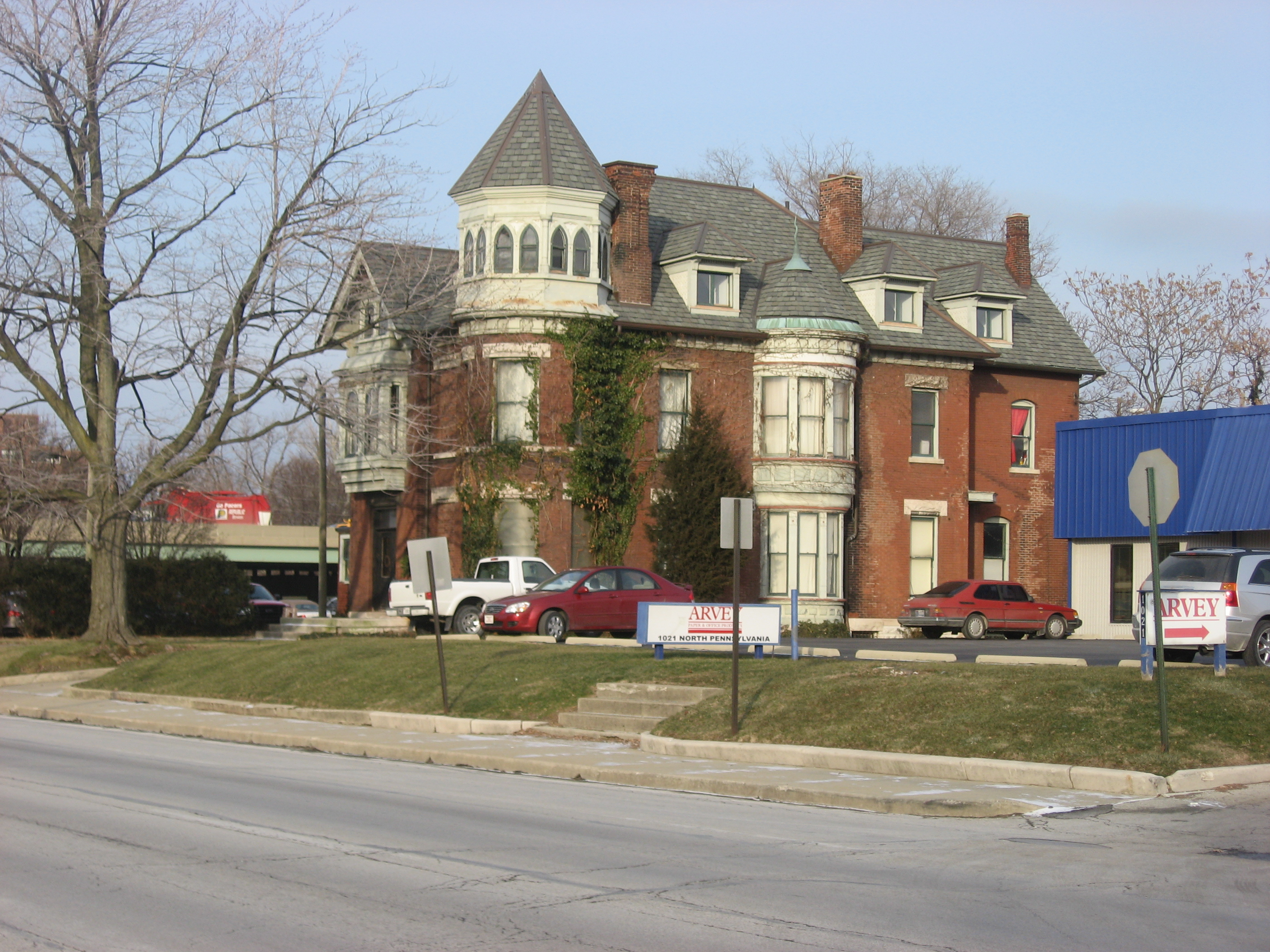
House built in 1895 for Fletcher's grandson, Calvin I. Fletcher (III), in Indianapolis

=== Farming ===
From 1839 to 1855 Calvin Fletcher owned a 269-acre (109 ha) farm called Wood Lawn, which would later be developed as Fletcher Place. His son Stoughton divided it into lots and developed it into a residential area. The settlement had several residents who made "many contributions were made to the early development of architecture, religion, commerce, education, and social life in the city of early Indianapolis". By 1852, Fletcher's farms adjacent to Indianapolis's northeast side had increased to approximately 1,400 acres (570 ha). He also owned other farms in Marion County and in Morgan County. He shipped cattle to his brother Elijah Fletcher in Lynchburg, Virginia, which (with real estate investments as well) made both wealthy men.

== Community service ==
=== Education ===
Fletcher actively supported and led a variety of activities to assist his community. Although his own education was limited, he strongly supported the free public school system. In 1851 Fletcher was appointed to the Southeast District as one of three superintendents for the new Indianapolis free public schools. In 1853 the Indianapolis City Council appointed Fletcher as one of the first members of the Indianapolis Board of School Trustees. Fletcher was also appointed a trustee during the organization of Asbury College which became DePauw University, serving on the college's board from 1837 to 1839 and as its treasurer from 1848 to 1855. Fletcher was also a trustee for the Marion County Seminary and the Indiana Female College (and president of that board of trustees in 1850).

=== Agriculture ===
Fletcher supported agricultural development and helped organize Indiana's first agricultural fairs in the county and state. He helped found the Marion County Agricultural Society, becoming its treasurer in 1835 and its president in 1851. In addition, Fletcher was a founder of the State Horticultural Society.

=== Abolition and temperance ===
Fletcher was an abolitionist like his friend and colleague, Ovid Butler, but unlike his Virginia-based brother Elijah. Calvin Fletcher became Indiana's state colonization society's manager in 1829. Also in 1829 he represented four enslaved women in a suit against their enslaver, William Sewall, in which the court ruled in favor of the women's freedom. He joined the Free Soil Party in 1848 and was a member of the Indiana state central committee. In 1852, Calvin Fletcher's long-standing interest in colonization led him to support a State Board of Colonization that would provide state funds to assist blacks living in Indiana to establish a colony in Africa. He also helped found the Indiana Total Abstinence Temperance Society, and in 1863 led the Freedman's Aid Commission.

=== Military assistance ===
Fletcher and his family also contributed to and participated in the American Civil War. Three of Fletcher's sons served in the Union army.

He also supported the organization of the U.S. colored troops in Indiana during the war. The 28th Regiment U.S. Colored Troops used his farm land to train between December 1863 and April 1864. During the war, Fletcher helped provide aid for soldiers' families, assisted local efforts to welcome returning soldiers home, and served on the city's Sanitation Committee. At the request of Indiana Governor Oliver P. Morton, Fletcher purchased arms for Indiana's regiments. After the war, Fletcher contributed to the Freedman's Aid Society.

=== Public welfare ===
Fletcher assisted the Indianapolis Benevolent Society, a local organization that helped the city's poor, serving for years as its secretary. He was also interested in the efforts of the Widows and Orphans Society and active in the temperance movement.

=== Methodist Church ===
Fletcher was known as a very religious man. He joined the Methodist Church in 1829 and provided financial support to assist other denominations build their own churches, thus contributing to help erect almost all early churches in Indianapolis. Fletcher became superintendent of Sunday Schools at Asbury Chapel and Roberts Chapel (after having helped establish those Methodist congregations in Indianapolis), and also attended Wesley Chapel on the Circle. The Fletcher Place United Methodist Church was built on the site his house. Fletcher helped acquire property to establish Crown Hill Cemetery, a new burial ground at Indianapolis, organized the nonprofit corporation to operate it, and was later buried there.

=== Indiana history ===
Fletcher had a longtime interest in history. A member of the New England Historical and Genealogical Society, he became one of the original members of the Indiana Historical Society (IHS), founded in 1830.

Fletcher's diary, donated to the IHS by his family in the 1920s, is preserved in the IHS collections and is used as a source for understanding life in the early nineteenth-century Midwest.

== Death and legacy ==
Fletcher died on May 26, 1866, after a brief illness and complications from injuries he suffered when he had been thrown from his horse two months earlier. Fletcher was buried in Indianapolis at Crown Hill Cemetery. Keziah Fletcher sold the Fletcher home on Pennsylvania Street after her husband's death, left Indianapolis, and returned to the East Coast, where she died in Boston on June 10, 1899. Several of the Fletcher children went on to have successful careers of their own, including Presbyterian missionary James Cooley Fletcher and Dr. William Baldwin Fletcher (who would also be elected to the state senate in 1882 and organized the local sanatorium).

The Indiana Statehouse has a marble bust of Calvin Fletcher. His former farm, Wood Lawn, was developed after his death into housing for German and Irish immigrants and craftsman, especially during 1890–1920. His home site eventually became Fletcher Place United Methodist Church. The northern part of Fletcher Place was listed on the National Register of Historic Places as the Fletcher Place Historic District in 1982 and the southern part as Holy Rosary-Danish Church Historic District (also known as Fletcher Place II) in 1986. Fletcher Avenue remains a major road in Indianapolis, and has a marked exit from I-65, although construction of that interstate demolished hundreds of Fletcher Place homes and isolated the remainder from the Fountain Square and Bates–Hendricks neighborhoods.

The Indiana Historical Society published The Diary of Calvin Fletcher in nine volumes between 1972 and 1983. Fletcher's entries, which date from 1817 until 1866, describe the details of daily life in Indianapolis, including a wide range of topics as well as his personal interests, acquaintances, and community activities. The diaries remain an "essential source for the study of early Indiana".
