= Richard Francis Burton bibliography =

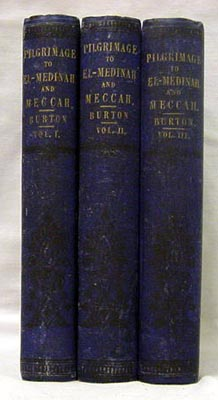
The first edition of Burton's Personal Narrative of a Pilgrimage to Al Madinah and Meccah, 3 vols. (1855-6).

The British explorer and Arabist Sir Richard Francis Burton (1821–1890) published over 40 books and countless articles, monographs and letters. Most of Burton's books are travel narratives or translations. His only works of original imaginative fiction are both in verse: Stone Talk (1865) and the well-known The Kasidah (1880), both of which he published under the pseudonym "Frank Baker".

A great number of Burton's journal and magazine pieces have never been catalogued.

== Books ==
=== 1850s ===
- Goa and the Blue Mountains (1851)
- Scinde or the Unhappy Valley (1851)
- Sindh and the Races That Inhabit the Valley of the Indus (1851)
- Falconry in the Valley of the Indus (1852)
- A Complete System of Bayonet Exercise (1853)
- Personal Narrative of a Pilgrimage to Al Madinah and Meccah 3 Vols. (1855-6). See also PDF facsimile
- First Footsteps in East Africa (1856). See also PDF Facsimile .
- The Lake Regions of Central Equatorial Africa (1859)

=== 1860s ===
- The Lake Regions of Central Africa (1860)
- The City of the Saints, Among the Mormons and Across the Rocky Mountains to California (1861)
- Wanderings in West Africa (1863)
- Abeokuta and the Cameroon Mountains (1863)
- A Mission to Gelele, King of Dahomé (1864)
- The Nile Basin (1864) With James McQueen.
- Wit and Wisdom From West Africa (1865)
- Stone Talk (1865)
- The Guide-book. A Pictorial Pilgrimage to Mecca and Medina (1865).
- Explorations of the Highlands of the Brazil (1869)

=== 1870s ===
- Letters From the Battlefields of Paraguay (1870)
- Vikram and the Vampire or Tales of Hindu Devilry (1870). See also PDF Facsimile.
- Unexplored Syria (1872)
- Zanzibar (1872)
- Ultima Thule (1872)
- The Lands of Cazembe. Lacerda's Journey to Cazembe in 1798 (1873). Edited and translated by Burton.
- The Captivity of Hans Stade of Hesse, in A.D. 1547-1555, Among the Wild Tribes of Eastern Brazil. Translated by Albert Tootal and annotated by Richard F. Burton.
- A New System of Sword Exercise for Infantry (1876)
- Two Trips to Gorilla Land and the Cataracts of the Congo (1876) See also PDF Facsimile.
- Etruscan Bologna (1876)
- Sind Revisited (1877)
- The Gold Mines of Midian (1878)
- The Land of Midian (revisited) (1879)

=== 1880s ===
- Os Lusiadas (The Lusiads) (two volumes 1880)
- The Kasidah of Haji Abdu El-Yezdi (1880). See also PDF Facsimile.
- A Glance at the Passion-Play (1881).
- To the Gold Coast for Gold 2 Vols. (1883). See also PDF Facsimile.
- The Kama Sutra of Vatsyayana (1883) (with F. F. Arbuthnot).
- Camoens: His Life and His Lusiads (1883)
- Camoens. The Lyricks 2 Vols (1884)
- The Book of the Sword (1884)
- The Book of the Thousand Nights and a Night (ten volumes 1885)
- The Perfumed Garden of the Shaykh Nefzawi (1886)
- The Supplemental Nights to the Thousand Nights and a Night (six volumes 1886 – 1888)

=== Posthumous ===
- Leonard C. Smithers and Sir Richard Burton (translators). Priapeia sive diversorum poetarum in Priapum lusus or Sportive Epigrams on Priapus by divers poets in English verse and prose. 1890 .
- (1893) Il Pentamerone; or, The Tale of Tales. Being a translation by the late Sir Richard Burton K.C.M.G., of Il Pentamerone; overo Lo Cunto de li Cunte, Trattemiento de li Peccarille, of Giovanni Battista Basile, Count of Torone (Gian Alessio Abbattutis)
- The Carmina of Catullus. Now first completely Englished into Verse and Prose, the Metrical Part by Capt. Sir Richard F. Burton, K.C.M.G., F.R.G.S., etc., etc., etc., and the Prose Portion, Introduction, and Notes Explanatory and Illustrative by Leonard C. Smithers. H. S. Nichols & Co. (printed for the translators; for private subscribers only), London 1894
- The Jew, the Gypsy and El Islam (1898)
- The Sentiment of the Sword: A Country-House Dialogue (1911)
- Selected Papers on Anthropology, Travel & Exploration, N.M. Penzer, editor; London: Robert M. McBride (1924).
- Of No Country: An Anthology of the Works of Sir Richard Francis Burton, Frank McLynn, editor; London: Scribners (1990).

== Articles, monographs, reviews and published correspondence ==
=== 1840s ===
- "Notes Relative to the Population of the Sind; and the Customs, Language, and Literature of the People", Bombay Government Records, New Series No. 17, Part 2 (1847), pp. 637–57.
- "Brief Notes Relative to the Division of Time, and Articles of Cultivation in Sind; to Which Are Appended Remarks on the Modes of Intoxication in That Province", Bombay Government Records, New Series No. 17, Part 2 (1848), pp. 613–36.
- "A Grammar of the Jataki or Belohcki Dialect" (1849), Journal of the Bombay Branch of the Royal Asiatic Society, Vol. III, No. 12 (January), pp. 84–125.
- "Notes and Remarks on Dr Dorn's Chrestomathy of the Pushtu or Afghan Language" (1849), Journal of the Bombay Branch of the Royal Asiatic Society, Vol. III, No. 12 (January), pp. 58–69.

=== 1850s ===
- "Reply to review of Falconry in the Valley of the Indus" (1852), Athenaeum, 24 July, No. 1291, p. 804.
- "Reply to review of Falconry in the Valley of the Indus" (1853), The Zoologist, Vol. XI, pp. 3646–3648.
- "Journey to Medina, with Route from Yamba" (1854), Journal of the Royal Geographical Society, Vol. XXIV, pp. 208–25.
- "A Journey from El-Medina to Mecca down the 'Darb el Sharki' on the Eastern Road (Hitherto Unvisited by Europeans) in September 1853" (1855), Journal of the Royal Geographical Society, Vol. XXV, pp. 121–36.
- "Narrative of a Trip to Harar" (1855), Journal of the Royal Geographical Society, Vol. XXV, pp. 136–50.
- "Defence of the Bashi-Bazouks" (1855), The Times (6 December).
- "Letter regarding Mecca" (1856), Athenaeum (5 April), No. 1484, p. 428.
- "Central Asia" (1856), The Times (19 February)
- "Notes from the Journal of the East African Expedition, Under the Command of Capt Richard F. Burton" (1857), Proceedings of the Royal Geographical Society, Vol. II (1857–58), pp. 52–6; discussion pp. 56–8.
- "Zanzibar; and Two Months in East Africa" (1858), Blackwood's Magazine, Vol. LXXXIII, pp. 200–24, 276–90, 572–89.
- "A Coasting Voyage from Mombasa to the Pangani River; Visit to Sultan Kimwere; and Progress of the Expedition into the Interior" (1858), Journal of the Royal Geographical Society, Vol. XXVIII, pp. 188–226.
- "Progress of the Expedition into the Interior" (1858), Journal of the Royal Geographical Society, Vol. XXVIII (1858), pp. 220–6.
- "Explorations in Eastern Africa" (1858), Proceedings of the Royal Geographical Society, Vol. III (1858–59), pp. 348–52.
- "Extracts from Reports by Captains Burton and Speke, of the East African Expedition, on Their Discovery of Lake Ujiji etc, in Central Africa" (1858), Proceedings of the Royal Geographical Society, Vol. III (1858–59), pp. 111–16; discussion on pp. 116–17.
- "The Lake Regions of Central Equatorial Africa, with Notices of the Lunar Mountains and the Sources of the White Nile; Being the Results of an Expedition Undertaken Under the Patronage of Her Majesty's Government and the Royal Geographical Society of London, in the Years 1857-1859" (1859), Journal of the Royal Geographical Society, Vol. XXIX (1859), pp. 1–454.
- "Discussion" [on James Macqueen, Portuguese Journeys in Central Africa] (1859), Proceedings of the Royal Geographical Society, Vol. III (1858–59), p. 363.
- "Presentation of the Royal Awards" (1859), Proceedings of the Royal Geographical Society, Vol. III (1858–59), pp. 217–19.
- "Dr Livingstone", The Times, 8 October 1859.

=== 1860s ===
- "Letter about plans after leaving Salt Lake City" (1860), Athenaeum, 17 Nov., No. 1725, p. 674
- "Letter" (1860), Proceedings of the Royal Geographical Society, Vol. V (1860–61), pp. 1–2.
- "Letters on Dahomey", Report of the African Aid Society, 1st Report (July 1860 to 31 March 1862), pp. 24–38
- "Account of the Ascent of the Camaroons Mountain, in Western Africa" (1861–62), Proceedings of the Royal Geographical Society, Vol. VI, pp. 238–48.
- "Ascent of the Ogun, or Abbeokuta River" (1861–62), Proceedings of the Royal Geographical Society, Vol. VI, pp. 49, 64–6.
- "Letter from Capt. Richard Burton, F.R.G.S., H.M. Consul to Fernando Po, to Dr. Norton Shaw" (1861–62), Proceedings of the Royal Geographical Society, Vol. VI, pp. 64–6.
- "The Ethnological Society", The Times, 8 July 1861.
- "Ethnological Notes on M. du Chaillu's Explorations and Adventures in Equatorial Africa" (1861), Transactions of the Ethnological Society of London, New Series, Vol. 1, pp. 316–26.
- "Letter: Kilimanjaro and its snows" (1862), Athenaeum, 19 July, No 1812, pp. 81–2.
- "Witnesses oaths, R. C. Henry Lemnos Statement of the Outrage Committed upon an English Factory in Benin River" (1862), Liverpool: Lee Nightingale.
- "Ascent of the Cameroon Mountains" (1862), [title only] Report of the British Association for 1862, p. 195.
- "The Ivory Trade of Zanzibar" (1862), The Technologist, Vol. II., pp. 225–8.
- "The Great Gorilla Controversy" (1862), The Times, 23 December.
- "Transportation" (1862), The Times, 31 December.
- "A Day amongst the Fans" (1863), Anthropological Review, Vol. 1(1863), pp. 43–54.
- "My Wanderings in West Africa: A Visit to the Renowned Cities of Wari and Benin" (1863), Fraser's Magazine, Vol. LXVII, pp. 135–57, 273–89, 407–22.
- "An Exploration of the Elephant Mountain in Western Equatorial Africa" (1863), Journal of the Royal Geographical Society, XXXIII, pp. 241–50.
- "Correspondence with British Ministers and Agents in Foreign Countries, and with Foreign Ministers in England, Relative to the Slave Trade" (1863), Accounts and Papers, Vol. XLIII for 1863 [Vol. LXXI in the overall series for that year]; London: Harrison & Sons; pp. xv, 316.
- "Notes on Certain Matters Connected with the Dahoman" (1863), Memoirs Read Before the Anthropological Society of London, Vol. I (1863–64), pp. 308–21.
- "Penal Transportation" (1863), The Times, 9 January.
- "Penal Transportation" (1863), The Times, 27 January.
- "Camaroon Island for Convicts' (1863), The Times, 5 January.
- "Notes on Scalping" (1864), Anthropological Review, Vol. II, pp. 49-52.
- "Notes on Waitz's Anthropology" (1864), Anthropological Review, Vol. II, pp. 233–50.
- "On Skulls from Annabom, in the West African Seas" (1864), Anthropological Review, Vol. II, p. ccxxx.
- "The African Mystery" (1864), Athenaeum, 19 March, pp. 407–8.
- "The Nile Mystery" (1864), Athenaeum, 24 December, pp. 861–2.
- "African Discoveries" (1864), Athenaeum, 18 June, No. 1912, pp. 836–7.
- "Ethnology of Dahomey" (1864), Athenaeum, 1 October, No. 1927, p. 435.
- "On Lake Tanganyika" (1864), Athenaeum, 19 November, No. 1934, p. 677.
- "Correspondence with British Ministers and Agents in Foreign Countries, and with Foreign Ministers in England, Relating to the Slave Trade" (1864), London: Harrison & Sons.
- "Accounts and Papers" (1864), Vol. XXXV [Vol. LXVI in the overall series for that year].
- "Lake Tanganyika, Ptolemy's Western Lake-Reservoir of the Nile" (1864), Proceedings of the Royal Geographical Society, Vol. IX (1864–65), pp. 6–8.
- "On the Present State of Dahome" (1864), Report of the British Association for 1864, pp. 137–9.
- "On the River Congo" (1864), Report of the British Association for 1864, pg 140.
- "The African Climate" (1864), Times, 16 June.
- "The Kames Mills" (1864), Times, 22 November.
- "The Nile Sources" (1864), Times, 23 September.
- "The Nile Mystery" (1865), Athenaeum, 14 January, p. 53.
- "From London to Rio de Janeiro: Letters to a Friend" (1865), Fraser's Magazine, Vol. LXXII, pp. 492–503; also Vol. LXXIII (1866), pp. 78–92, 496-510 and Vol. LXXIV (1866), pp. 159–78.
- "Discussion" (1865) [on H. B. Owen, "Missionary Successes and Negro Converts"], Journal of the Anthropological Society of London, Vol. III, pp. cciv-xi.
- "Discussion" (1865) [on S. Laing, "Some Ancient Shell-Mounds and Graves in Caithness"], Journal of the Anthropological Society of London, Vol. III, pp. iv-vi.
- "Discussion" (1865) [on W. Winwood Reade, "Efforts of Missionaries Among Savages"], Journal of the Anthropological Society of London, Vol. III (1865), pp. clxix-xv, clxxix, clxxxi.
- "Letter" (1865), Journal of the Anthropological Society of London, Vol. III, pp. ccxc-ccxcii.
- "Reference" (1865) [To Carl Vogt, "Lectures on Man"], Journal of the Anthropological Society of London, Vol. III (1865), p. lxxiv.
- "Discussion of Notes on the Dahomans" (1865), Journal of the Anthropological Society of London, Vol. III, pp. vi - xi.
- "On Lake Tanganyika, Ptolemy's Western Lake-Reservoir of the Nile" (1865), Journal of the Royal Geographical Society, Vol. XXXV, pp. 1–15.
- "Correspondence with British Ministers and Agents in Foreign Countries, and with Foreign Ministers in England, Relating to the Slave Trade" (1865), London: Harrison & Sons, in: Accounts and Papers, Vol. XXVII for 1865, Vol. LVI in the overall series for that year. pp. xiv-, 319.
- "Notes on an Hermaphrodite" (1865), In: Memoirs Read Before the Anthropological Society of London, Vol. II (1865–66), pp. 262–3.
- "Evidence in Report from the Select Committee on Africa (Western Coast); Together with the Proceedings of the committee, Minutes of Evidence, and Appendix" (1865), Reports from Committees, Vol. I for 1865, Vol. V in the overall series for that year.
- "A Day amongst the Fans" (1865), Transactions of the Ethnological Society of London, New Series Vol. III, pp. 36–47.
- "The Present State of Dahome" (1865), Transactions of the Ethnological Society of London, New Series, Vol. III, pp. 400–8.
- "A Volcano in Southern Brazil" (1866), In: Appendix J to James C. Fletcher and D.P. Kidder, Brazil and the Brazilians Portrayed in Historical and Descriptive Sketches (Boston: Little, Brown, & Co., 6th ed.) p. 633.
- "Letter on a Kjokkenmodding at Santos, Brazil" (1866), Journal of the Anthropological Society of London, Vol. IV, pp. cxcii-cxciv.
- "African Discovery" (1867), Athenaeum, (27 July issue), pg 115.
- ""The Extinction of Slavery in Brazil, From a Practical Point of View" (1868), Anthropological Review, Vol. VI, pp. 56-7.
- "Vikram and the Vampire; Or, Tales of Indian Devilry" (1868), Fraser's Magazine, Vol. LXXVII, pp. 407–32; 560-76; 700-16; Vol. LXXVIII (1868), pp. 230–48; 480-97; 584-602; 748-6 1.
- "On the Sources of the Nile" [Isabel Burton] (1869), Athenaeum (27 November issue), No. 2196, p. 701.
- ["Isabel Burton"] "Who Lasts Wins", Fraser's Magazine, Vol LXXIX, pp. 165–168.

=== 1870s ===
- "Harran el Awamid and Damascus Swamps" (1870), Athenaeum (12 November issue), No. 2246, pp. 628–29.
- "The Watuta" (1870), Athenaeum, (4 June issue), No. 2223, p. 745.
- "Memorandum by Consul Captain Burton, on the Baghdad Caravan" (1871), In: Accounts and Papers, Vol. XXIX for 1871, Vol. LXV in the overall series for that year.
- "On Anthropological Collections from the Holy Land, with Notes on the Human Remains by Dr C. Carter-Blake" (1871), Journal of the Anthropological Institute, Vol. I (1871–72), pp. 300–12.
- "On Anthropological Collections from the Holy Land II" (1871), Journal of the Anthropological Institute, Vol. I (1871–72), pp. 321–24.
- "Proverbia Communia Syriaca" (1871), Journal of the Royal Asiatic Society New Series, Vol. V, pp. 338–66.
- "The Case of Captain Burton; Late H.B.M. 's Consul at Damascus". London: Clayton Co. n.d. [but 1871]. Printed for Foreign Office use only. pp. 141.
- "Discussion" (1871), [on "Two Letters from Dr Kirk"], Proceedings of the Royal Geographical Society, Vol. XVI (1871–72), p. 104.
- "Discussion" (1871) [on Baron Von Maltzan, Geography of Southern Arabia], Proceedings of the Royal Geographical Society, Vol. XVI (1871–72), pp. 122–3.
- "On the Ukara, or the Ukerewe Lake of Equatorial Africa" (1871), Proceedings of the Royal Geographical Society, Vol. XVI (1871–72) pp. 129–30.
- "Notes on an Exploration of the Tulul el Safa" (1871), Proceedings of the Royal Geographical Society, Vol. XVI (1871–72), pp. 104–115.
- "African Explorers" (1871), Times (28 October).
- "Dr Livingstone" (1871), Times (30 November).
- "Evidence in the Tichborne Case" (1871), Times (18 December).
- "Scottish Corporation Dinner" (1871), Times, (30 November).
- "The City of Samaria" (1871), Times (26 September).
- "Moabite Stones" (1872), [not by Burton], Athenaeum (3 February), pp. 148–9.
- "The Moabite Stone I" (1872), Athenaeum (13 April), pp. 464–6.
- "The Moabite Stone II" (1872), Athenaeum (20 April), pp. 495–500.
- "The Diamantine Country" (1872), Athenaeum (20 January), No. 2308, p. 83.
- "Translations" (1872), Athenaeum (24 February), No. 2313, pp. 241–3.
- "A Ride in the Holy Land" (1872), Cassell's Magazine New Series, Vol. V, pp. 434–7.
- "Chapters from Travel No I: Damascus" (1872), Cassell's Magazine New Series, Vol. V, pp. 197–8.
- "Chapters from Travel No. II: Palmyra" (1872), Cassell's Magazine New Series, Vol. V, pp. 212–15.
- "Discussion" (1872) [on George Harris, On Hereditary Transmission of Endowments and Qualities of Different Kinds], Journal of the Anthropological Institute, Vol. II (1872–73), p. 9.
- "On Human Remains and Other Articles from Iceland" (1872), Journal of the Anthropological Institute, Vol. II (1872–73), pp. 342–4, notes on the remains by C. Carter Blake, pp. 344–6, discussion on p. 347.
- "Gleanings in Syria and Palestine" (1872), Journal of the London Institution, April. pp. 69–70
- "Notes of a Reconnaissance of the Anti-Libanus" (1872), Journal of the Royal Geographical Society, Vol. XLII, pp. 408–25. Map.
- "Notes on an Exploration of the Tuhil el Safa, the Volcanic Region East of Damascus, and the Umm Niran Cave" (1872), Journal of the Royal Geographical Society, Vol. XLII, pp. 49–61.
- "Evidence" (1872), Parliamentary Papers, pp. 110–112.
- "Explanation of an Altar-Stone from Jebel Duruz Hauran, and a Thurible of Bronze from Near Damascus" (1872), Proceedings of the Society of Antiquaries of London, Vol. V, pp. 289–91.
- "Unexplored Syria" (1873), Academy, Vol. IV (2 June), pp. 217–8.
- "Letters" (1873), Anthropologia, No. 1 (October), pp. 2–4.
- "Notes on the Kitchen-Middens of Sao Paulo, Brazil, and the Footprints of St Thomas, Alias Zome" (1873), Anthropologia, No. 1 (October), pp. 44–58; discussion on pp. 58–9.
- "Cazembe" (1873), Athenaeum, 13 September, No. 2394, p. 340.
- "Count F. Dal Verma" (1873), Athenaeum, 11 October, No. 2398, pp. 468–9.
- "The Vienna Exhibition" (1873), Athenaeum, 10 May, No. 2376, pp. 598–99.
- "The Vienna Exhibition" (1873), Athenaeum, 17 May, No. 2377, pp. 630–1.
- "En Route to Hebron" (1873), Cassell's Magazine New Series, Vol. VI, pp. 69–72.
- "The Primordial Inhabitants of Minas Geraes, and the Occupations of the Present Inhabitants" (1873), Journal of the Anthropological Institute, Vol. II (1872–73), pp. 407–23, discussion on p. 423.
- "Letter" [re: William Desborough Cooley] (1873), Ocean Highways, Vol. I (1873–74), pp. 258–9.
- "Notes on Mr Stanley's Work" (1873), Ocean Highways, Vol. I (1873–74), pp. 55–9.
- "Two Trips on the Gold Coast: First Trip - The Beulah Gardens and the Ajumanti Hills. Second Trip - Along the Shore to the Volta River" (1873), Ocean Highways, Vol. I (1873–74), pp. 448–61.
- "Testimony of Captain Burton on Spiritualism" (1873), Spiritualist, Vol. III, pp. 309–10.
- "Unexplored Syria" [letter] (1873), The Academy, Vol. IV, pp. 217–18
- "Notes on the Castellieri or Prehistoric Ruins of the Istrian Peninsula" (1874), Anthropologia, No. 3 (October), pp. 376–404.
- "Dr Livingstone" (1874), Athenaeum, 14 February, p. 228.
- "Comments on Etruscan Researches" (1874), Athenaeum, 28 March, No. 2422, pp. 425–6.
- "Etruscan Researches" [1] (1874), Athenaeum, 30 May, No. 2431, p. 731.
- "Etruscan Researches" [2] (1874), Athenaeum, 18 July, No. 2438, p. 83.
- "Petrarch's Bones" (1874), Athenaeum, 29 August, No. 2444, p. 275.
- "My Parentage and Early Career as a Slave; With a Note by R.F.B." (1874), Geographical Magazine I, pp. 63–9.
- "Note on 'My Parentage and Early Career as a Slave'" (1874), Geographical Magazine I, p. 120.
- "Geographical Notes on the Province of Minas Geraes" Journal of the Royal Geographical Society, Vol. XLIV (1874), pp. 263–300.
- "Letter" [re: Cooley] (1874), Ocean Highways, Vol. I (1873–74), p. 432–4.
- "The Indian Affinities of the Gypsies" (1875), Academy, Vol. VII (27 March), pp. 324–5.
- "Review of Marquis de Compiegne L'Afrique Equatoriale, Vol 1." (1875), Academy, Vol. VIII (30 October), pp. 444–6.
- "Mr. Stanley's Expedition" (1875), Athenaeum, 27 November, pp. 712–13.
- "L'Afrique Equatoriale: Gabonais Pahouins-Gallois" (1875), Athenaeum, 23 October, pp. 536–8.
- "The Lakes of Central Africa", (1875) Athenaeum, 11 December, pp. 793.
- "The London Publishing Company" (1875), Athenaeum, 10 April, No. 2476, p. 489.
- "Sosivizka the Bandit of Dalmatia" (1875), Cornhill Magazine, Vol XXXII, pp. 560–576.
- "A Trip up the Congo or Zaire River" (1875), Geographical Magazine, Vol. II, pp. 203–4,
- "Captain Burton on the Outlet to Tanganyika" (1875), Geographical Magazine, Vol. II, p. 118.
- "Mr Stanley and the Victoria Nyanza" (1875), Geographical Magazine, Vol. II, pp. 354–5.
- "The Long Wall of Salona and the Ruined Cities of Pharia and Gelsa di Lesina" (1875), Journal of the Anthropological Institute, Vol. V (1875–76), pp. 252–97; discussion pp. 297–9.
- "The Port of Trieste, Ancient and Modern" (1875), Journal of the Society of Arts, Vol. XXV, pp. 979–86, 996–1,006.
- "Patent for Fire Arms. A.D. 1879. Sept. I st. No. 3069. Specification of Capt R. F. Burton, 1876" (1875), London: Eyre & Spottiswood.
- "Notes on Rome" (1875), Macmillan's Magazine, Vol. XXXI, pp. 57–63, 126–34.
- "Geographical Notes" [on Lake Tanganyika] (1875), Pall Mall Gazette, 25 March, pp. 10–11.
- "The Trans-Jordanic Region" (1875), Quarterly Statement of the Palestine Exploration Fund July 1875, pp. 120–3.
- "A Grumble" (1875), Times (18 May).
- "African Exploration" (1875), Times (21 June).
- "A Discovery at Laibach" (1876), Academy, Vol. IX (15 January), p. 63.
- "Review of Ferdinand de Lesseps, Lettres, Journal, et Documents pour servir a l'histoire du Canal de Suez", [Part 1] (1876), Academy, Vol. IX (5 February), pp. 111–13.
- "Review of Ferdinand de Lesseps, Lettres, Journal, et Documents pour servir a l'histoire du Canal de Suez", [Part 2] (1876), Academy, Vol. IX (12 February), pp. 139–41.
- "Review of Marquis de Compiegne, L'Afrique Equatoriale, Vol 2." (1876), Academy, Vol. IX (1876-06-03), pp. 529–31.
- "The Albert Nyanza" (1876), Athenaeum, p. 118 (22 July).
- "The Castelliere of Jurkovac" (1876), Athenaeum, p. 598 (4 November).
- "A Case of Homicide" (1876), Athenaeum, No. 2516, p. 90 (15 January).
- "Scoperte Antropologiche in Ossero" (1876), Estratto dall'Archeografe Triestine, Fasc. 2 Vol. V, pp. 1–6.
- "Trade of Trieste" (1876), Journal of the Society of Arts, Vol. XXV (1876), pp. 62–3, 935–41, 946-53
- "Discussion" [on James A. Grant, "On Mr. H. M. Stanley's Exploration of the Victoria Nyanza"] (1876), Proceedings of the Royal Geographical Society, Vol. XX (1875–76), pp. 49–50.
- "The Volcanic Eruptions of Iceland in 1874 and 1875" (1876), Proceedings of the Royal Society of Edinburgh, Vol. XI (1875–76), pp. 44–58.
- "The Nizam Diamond: The Diamond in India" (1876), Quarterly Journal of Science, New Series, Vol. VI, pp. 351–60.
- "Spirit Phenomena" (1876), Times, (13 November).
- "Bologna" (1877), Academy, Vol. XI (24 March), p. 251.
- "Mr Stanley's Last Explorations" (1877), Athenaeum pp. 568–9 (3 November).
- "The Ogham Character" (1877), Athenaeum p. 447 (7 April).
- "The Ogham Inscription" (1877), Athenaeum p. 306 (8 Sept).
- "The Ogham Inscriptions" (1877), Athenaeum pp. 113–14 (28 July; and 28 September, p. 306).
- "The Turks, the Greeks, and the Slavs" (1877), Athenaeum, p. 193 (10 February).
- "The Moabite Stone" (1877), Athenaeum, No. 2567, pp. 17–8 (6 January).
- "Memoir on Charles T. Drake" (1877), In Literary Remains of C. T. Drake, ed. by Walter Besant; Richard Bentley and Son, London: pp. 14–22.
- "The Pelagosa Finds" (1877), Journal of the Anthropological Institute, Vol. VI (1876–77), p. 54.
- "A Word to the Reader" and "Notes" [on George L. Faber, Fiume and Her New Port] (1877), Journal of the Society of Arts, Vol. XXV, pp. 1,029-38, 1,040-6.
- "Mission to the Land of Midian" (1877) Times, 14 May 1877.
- "A Flitting through Sind", (1877), Times of India [overland weekly edition], pp. 16–18 (22 June).
- "Copyright" (1878), Athenaeum, p. 401 (28 September ).
- "The Land of Midian" (1878), Geographical Magazine, Vol. V, p. 272.
- "Flint Flakes from Egypt" (1878), Journal of the Anthropological Institute, Vol. VII (1877–78), pp. 323–4.
- "The Seaboard of Istria" (1878), Journal of the Anthropological Institute, Vol. VII (1877–78), pp. 341–63.
- "Midian and the Midianites" (1878), Journal of the Society of Arts, Vol. XXVII, pp. 16–24; discussion on pp. 24–7.
- "The Antiquities of Lissa and Pelagosa" (1878), Proceedings of the Society of Antiquaries London, 2nd Series, Vol. VII, pp. 141, 143.
- "The Land of Midian" (1878), Report of the British Association for 1878, pp. 630–1.
- "Spiritualism in Eastern Lands" (1878), Spiritualist, Vol. XXXIII, pp. 270–5.
- "Climate of Cyprus" (1878), Times (30 August).
- "Finds in Midian" (1878), Times (12 December).
- "Captain Cameron on an Indo-Mediterranean Railway" (1879), Academy, Vol. XVI, p. 376 (22 November).
- "The Meaning of 'Gorjer'" (1879), Academy, Vol. XVI, p. 177 (6 Sept).
- "Gold in Midian" (1879), Athenaeum, No. 2674, pp. 124–5 (25 January).
- "The Anthropological Congress at Laibach" (1879), Athenaeum, No. 2703, pp. 212–3 (16 August).
- "The Carinthian Burrows" (1879), Athenaeum, No. 2717, p. 664 (22 November).
- "Stones and Bones from Egypt and Midian" (1879), Journal of the Anthropological Institute, Vol. VIII (1878–79), pp. 290–319. Illustrated.
- "A Visit to Lissa and Pelagosa' (1879), Journal of the Royal Geographical Society, Vol. XLIX, pp. 151-88.
- "Itineraries of the Second Khedival Expedition: Memoir Explaining the New Map of Midian Made by the Egyptian Staff-Officers" (1879), Journal of the Royal Geographical Society, Vol. XLIX, pp. 1–150.
- "Discussion" [of Revd. T. J. Comber, Explorations Inland from Mount Cameroon, and journey through Cong to Makuta] (1879), Proceedings of the Royal Geographical Society, New Series, Vol. I, pp. 237–40.
- "Prophecy and Morality", Spiritualist, Vol. XIV, No. 2, p. 18.1879
- "Veritable and Singular Account of an Apparition, and the Saving of a Soul, in Castle Weixelstein, in Krain" [Translation of story from German] (1879), Spiritualist, Vol. XV, No. 12, pp. 138–40.
- "Remains of Buildings in Midian" and "Gold in Midian" (1879), Transactions of the Royal Institute of British Architects, No. 4 (1878-79), pp. 61–80.; and No. 5 (1878–79), pp. 83–4.

=== 1880s ===
- "Camoens" (1880), Academy, Vol. XVIII (27 Nov), pp. 384–5.
- "Midianite and Hittite Inscriptions" (1880), Athenaeum, 4 December, No. 2771, p. 750.
- "Giovanni Battista Belzoni" (1880), Cornhill Magazine, Vol. XLII, pp. 36–50.
- "The Partition of Turkey" (1880), Daily Telegraph, 7 March.
- "Captain R. F. Burton's Experiences" (1880), In: Psychic Facts, London: W. H. Harrison; Edited by W. H. Harrison, pp. 70–9.
- "Report on Two Expeditions to Midian" (1880), Journal of the Society of Arts, Vol. XXIX, pp. 98–9.
- "Assonance" (1881), Academy, Vol. XIX (7 May), p. 339.
- "Captain Burton's Lusiads" (1881), Academy, Vol. XIX (12 Feb), p. 119.
- "The Geographical Congress at Venice" (1881), Academy, Vol. XX (21 Oct), pp. 258–60.
- "The Statue of Marco Polo at Venice" (1881), Academy, Vol. XX (3 Dec ), p. 420.
- "Review of Serpa Pinto, How I Crossed Africa" [Part 1] (1881), Academy, Vol. XIX (21 May), pp. 365–7.
- "Review of Serpa Pinto, How I Crossed Africa" [Part 2] (1881), Academy, Vol. XIX (11 Jun), pp. 425–6.
- "The Arabian Nights" (1881), Athenaeum, 26 November, p. 703.
- "Three Sonnets from Camoens" (1881), Athenaeum, 26 February, No. 2783, p. 299.
- "Corpus Inscriptionum Americanarum" (1881), Athenaeum, 25 June, No. 2800, pp. 848–9
- "How to Deal with the Slave Scandal in Egypt" (1881), Manchester Examiner and Times, 21, 23, and 24 March.
- "Thermae of Monfalcone" (1881), The Field, 12 November, pp. 704–5; 17 December, p. 87; and 24 December 1881, p. 926.
- "Three Sonnets of Camoens" (1882), Academy, Vol. XXII (16 Sep), p. 203.
- "Review of Allan M. Taylor, Madeira: Its Scenery and How to See It" (1882), Academy, Vol. XXII (22 July), p. 59.
- "The Camoniana of Lisbon" (1882), Athenaeum, 28 January, No. 2831, p. 125.
- "Notes on Working the Gold Fields of Axim" (1882), Athenaeum; 22 April, No. 2843, p. 512.
- "Visit to the Gold District of Axim" (1882), Athenaeum; 25 March, No. 2839, p. 383.
- "Gold on the Gold Coast" (1882), Journal of the Society of Arts, Vol. XXX, pp. 785–90; discussion on pp. 790–4.
- "Letter to the Editor" (1882), Mining World, Vol. XXIII, p. 1417.
- "Discussion" [on Verney Lovett Cameron, "A Sketch Survey of the Ancobra and Prince's Rivers, and of the Takwa Range, Gold Coast"] (1882), Proceedings of the Royal Geographical Society, New Series; Vol. IV, pp. 505–7.
- "The Kong Mountains" (1882), Proceedings of the Royal Geographical Society, Vol. IV, pp. 484–6.
- "The Kong Mountains" (1882), Times, 27 June.
- "The Ethnology of Modern Midian" (1882), Transactions of the Royal Society of Literature, 2nd Series, Vol. XII, pp. 249–330.
- "The Ogham-Runes and El-Mushajjar: A Study" (1882), Transactions of the Royal Society of Literature, 2nd Series, Vol. XII, Part 1, pp. 1–46.
- "England's Duty to Egypt" (1883), Academy, Vol. XIII (26 May), p. 366.
- "The Late E. H. Palmer: I. Personal Reminiscences" (1883), Academy, Vol. XXIII (5 May), p. 311.
- "The Late E. H. Palmer: II. The Story of His Death" (1883), Academy, Vol. XXIII (12 May), pp. 329–30.
- "The Upper Congo Versus Europe" (1883), Academy, Vol. XXVIII (7 April), pp. 239–41.
- "Three Early Italian Sonnets" (1883), Academy, Vol. XXIV (25 August), pp. 129–30.
- "Review of C. E. Wilson, Persian Wit and Humour" (1883), Academy, Vol. XXIII (30 June), p. 460.
- "Stone Implements from the Gold Coast" (1883), Journal of the Anthropological Institute, Vol. XII, pp. 449–54.
- " 'Hydraulicking' on the Gold Coast" (1883), Mining World, Vol. XXIV, p. 43.
- "Gold Coast Mining" (1883), Mining World, Vol. XXIV, p. 196.
- "Gold Coast Mining" (1883), Mining World, Vol. XXIV, p. 546.
- "Letter to the Editor" (1883), Mining World, Vol. XXIV, p. 425.
- "Letter to the Editor" (1883), Mining World, Vol. XXIV, p. 485.
- "Mining on the Gold Coast: More Hydraulicking" (1883), Mining World, Vol. XXIV, pp. 531–2.
- "Mining on the Gold Coast" (1883), Mining World, Vol. XXIV, p. 620.
- "Mining on the Gold Coast" (1883), Mining World, Vol. XXV, p. 123.
- "Mining on the Gold Coast" (1883), Mining World, Vol. XXV, p. 225.
- "Mining on the Gold Coast" (1883), Mining World, Vol. XXV, p. 546–7.
- "Mining on the Gold Coast" (1883), Mining World, Vol. XXV, p. 599.
- "Mining on the Gold Coast" (1883), Mining World, Vol. XXV, p. 633.
- "Mining on the Gold Coast" (1883), Mining World, Vol. XXV, p. 92.
- "The Gold Coast" (1883), Mining World, Vol. XXIV, p. 283.
- "The Gold Coast" (1883), Mining World, Vol. XXIV, p. 336.
- "Letter to the Editor" [on Camoens] (1884), Academy, Vol. XXVI (15 Nov issue), pp. 324–5.
- "The Egyptian Question: I" (1884), Academy, Vol. XXV (12 Jan issue), pp. 27–8.
- "The Egyptian Question: II" (1884), Academy, Vol. XXV (19 Jan issue), pp. 45–7.
- "The Proposed British Commercial Geographical Society of London City" (1884), Academy, Vol. XXV (21 June issue), p. 439.
- "Review of W. A. Clouston, The Book of Sinbad" (1884), Academy, Vol. XXVI (20 Sep issue), pp. 175–6.
- "Review Robert Grant Watson, Spanish and Portuguese South America During the Colonial Period" (1884), Academy, Vol. XXV (17 May issue), pp. 342–3.
- "Burton's Speech" (1885), Academy, Vol. XXVIII (17 Oct issue), p. 254.
- "Lord Houghton" (1885), Academy, Vol. XXVIII (22 Aug issue), p. 118.
- "The Thousand Nights and a Night" (1885), Academy, Vol. XXVIII (17 Oct issue), p. 104.
- "Review of A. B. Ellis, West African Islands" (1885), Academy, Vol. XXVII (7 May issue), p. 163.
- "Review of Charles J. Lyall, Transactions of Ancient Arabian Poetry, Chiefly Pre-Islamic" (1885), Academy, Vol. XXVIII (8 Oct issue), pp. 214–15.
- "Review of Major B. C. Truman et al., The Field of Honour" (1885), Academy, Vol. XXVIII (1 Aug issue), pp. 68–9.
- "Review of The Journals of Major-General C. G. Gordon, C. B., at Khartoum" (1885), Academy Vol. XXVIII (11 July issue), pp. 19–20.
- "Review of I. G. N. Keith-Falconer, Kalilah and Dimnah" (1885), Academy, Vol. XXVII, pp. 432–3 (20 June issue).
- "On Volcanic Activity of Cameroons Peak" (1885), Athenaeum, No. 2992, pg 283 (28 February issue).
- "Discussion" [on F.L. James, A Journey Through the Somali Country to the Webbe Shebeyli] (1885), Proceedings of the Royal Geographical Society, New Series, Vol. VII, pp. 641–2.
- "A 'Diet' for Ireland" (1886), Academy, Vol. XXIX (16 January issue), pg 44.
- "Petroleum 'Discoveries' " (1886), Academy, Vol. XXIX (17 April issue), pg 274.
- "The Loan of MSS. from the Bodleian Library" (1886), Academy, Vol. XXX (13 November issue), pg 270.
- "The Orientalisation of Galland's Arabian Nights" (1886), Academy, Vol. XXX (23 October issue), pg 277.
- "Review of E. J. W. Gibb, The History of the Forty Vezirs" (1886), Academy, Vol. XXX (20 November issue), pp 337–8.
- "Review of The Voyage of John Huyghen van Linschoten to the East Indies" (1886), Academy, Vol. XXIX (26 March issue), pp. 212–13.
- "Review of William Napier Bruce, The Life of General Sir Charles Napier" (1886), Academy, Vol. XXIX (6 February issue), pp. 85–6.
- "Arabian Nights" (1886), Notes and Queries, 7th Series, I (5 May issue), pg 447.
- "Count Gozzadini" (1887), Academy, Vol. XXXII (10 September issue), pg 167.
- "Is Gordon Dead?" (1887), Academy, Vol. XXXI (30 April issue), pg 308.
- "The Thousand Nights and a Night" (1887), Academy, Vol. XXXI (22 January issue), pp. 60–1.
- "West African Gold Mines" (1887), Mining Journal, (5 February issue) [pseudonymous].
- "Lord Stratford de Redcliffe and Mr. S. Lane-Poole" (1888), Academy, Vol. XXXIV (1 September issue), pg 137.
- "Reprints of the Arabian Nights" (1888), Academy, Vol. XXXIV, pp 103–4.
- "The Bestial Element in Man" (1888), Academy, Vol. XXXIV (11 August issue), pg 87.
- "The Supplemental Nights" (1888), Academy, Vol. XXXIV (4 August issue), pg 72.
- "Review of A[ugustus]. B. Wylde, '83 to '87 in the Soudan" (1888), Academy, Vol. XXXIV (20 October issue), pp 249–50.
- "Review of Alexander Graham and H.S. Ashbee, Travels in Tunisia" (1888), Academy, Vol. XXXIII (16 June issue), pp 405–6.
- "Review of Charles M. Doughty, Travels in Arabia Deserta" (1888), Academy, Vol. XXXIV (28 July), pp. 47–8.
- "Review of H. Zotenberg, Histoire d' 'Ala Al-Din ou La Lampe Merveilleuse", Academy, Vol. XXXIII (4 Feb 1888), p. 79.
- "Review of Joseph Derenbourg, A Medieval Version of Kalilah and Dimnar", Academy, Vol. XXXIII (7 Jul 1888), pp. 3–4.
- "Review of Stanley Lane-Poole, The Life of Stratford Canning, Viscount Stratford de Redcliffe", [Part 1], Academy, Vol. XXXIV (24 Nov 1888), pp. 329–30
- "Review of Stanley Lane-Poole, The Life of Stratford Canning, Viscount Stratford de Redcliffe [Part 2], Academy, Vol. XXXIV (1888), pp. 379-80.
- "Seance familiere du 26 Novembre 1888 en l'honneur de Sir Richard-Francis Burton", Le Globe, Journal Geographique (Society de Geographic de Geneve), Vol. XVIII, 4th Series, Vol. VIII (Bulletin No. 1) (1888–89), pp. 15–18.
- "The Position at Suakin", The Times, 26 December 1888.
- "Notes from Lausanne", Academy, Vol. XXXV (23 Mar 1889), p. 204.
- "Notes from Vevey", Academy, Vol. XXXV (26 Jan 1889), pp. 57–8.
- "The Akkas" (1889), Journal of the Anthropological Institute, Vol. XVIII, p. 121.

=== Posthumous ===
- "Burton's Pilgrimage to Mecca: An Unpublished MS. of the Late Sir Richard F. Burton, F.R.S.L." [with an Introduction by W.H. Wilkins] (1899), Transactions of the Royal Society of Literature, Vol. XX, pp. 197–235.
- "Sentiment of the Sword" (1910), Field (7 May through 3 December issue)
