= Growth of Pedro II of Brazil =

In the life of Pedro II of Brazil, growth in both his personal and public roles took place in the decade beginning in 1853. At the start of this period, he was still struggling to find his way. But by its end the Emperor was a mature and steady leader, and Brazil was united and on its way to unprecedented national prosperity and prestige.

== Pedro II and politics ==
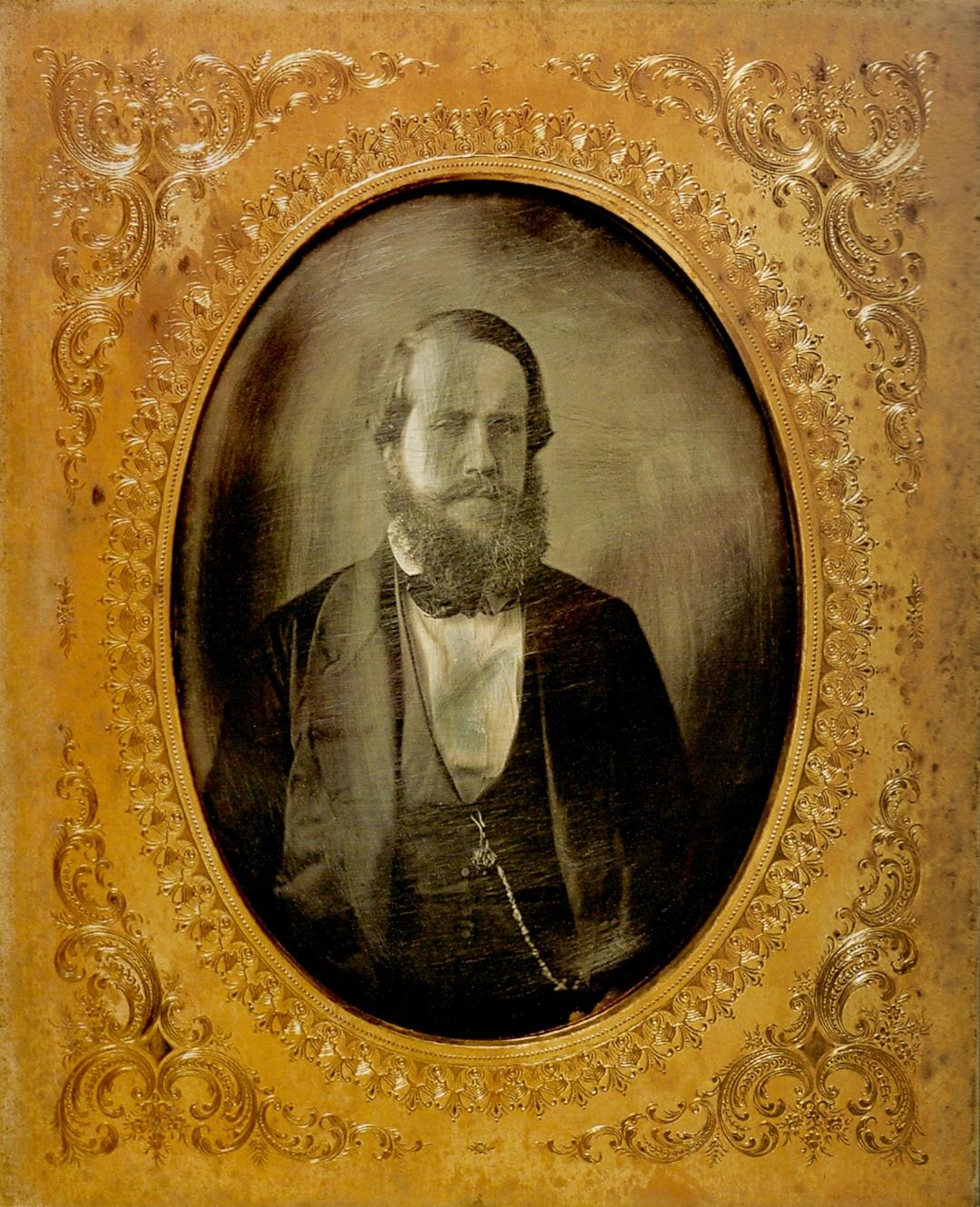
Pedro II, around age 26, c. 1852.

At the beginning of the 1850s, Brazil was enjoying internal stability and economic prosperity. The nation was being interconnected through railroad, electric telegraph and steamship lines, uniting it into a single entity. The general opinion, both at home and abroad, was that these accomplishments had been possible for two reasons: "its governance as a monarchy and the character of Pedro II".

As "monarch Pedro II influenced and was influenced by the political and social structures that made up Brazil. He did not rule in splendid isolation, nor was he a mere bystander whose advice politicians heeded only as it suited their interests." He was neither a British-style figurehead nor an autocrat in the manner of Russian czars. The Emperor exercised power through cooperation with elected politicians, economic interests, and popular support. Political parties themselves were dominated by, and promoted the agendas of, various socioeconomic factions and regional interests. This interdependence and interaction did much to influence the direction of Pedro II's reign.

The Emperor's great successes were achieved due largely to the non-confrontational and cooperative manner with which he approached both issues and the political figures with which he had to deal. He was remarkably tolerant, seldom taking offense at criticism, opposition, or even incompetence. He was diligent in appointing only highly qualified candidates to positions in the government, and sought to curb corruption. He did not have the constitutional authority to force acceptance of his initiatives without support, and his collaborative approach towards governing kept the nation progressing and enabled the political system to successfully function.

The uncertainty of his childhood and exploitation at the hands of others during his youth made the Emperor determined to maintain control over his own destiny. And to achieve self-determination required that he acquire and maintain sufficient power. He used his active and essential participation in directing the course of government as a means of influence. And though his direction became indispensable, it never devolved into "one-man rule." The Emperor respected the prerogatives of the legislature, even when they resisted, delayed, or thwarted his goals and appointments.

The Brazilian national political system resembled those in other parliamentary nations. The Emperor, as head of state, would ask the leader of either the Conservative or Liberal Party to form a cabinet. The other party formed the opposition in the legislature, a counterweight and check on the party in power. If support for the party in power diminished greatly, or if the cabinet resigned, the Emperor could call on others from either party to form a new government. "In his handling of the two parties, he needed to maintain a reputation for impartiality, work in accord with the popular mood, and avoid any flagrant imposition of his will on the political scene."

The active presence of Pedro II on the political scene was an important part of the government's structure, which also included the cabinet, the Chamber of Deputies and the Senate (the latter two formed the National Assembly, or Parliament). Most politicians appreciated and supported the Emperor's role. Many had lived through the regency period, when the lack of an emperor who could stand above petty and special interests led to years of strife between political factions. "Experienced had taught" them "to regard the emperor as indispensable to Brazil's continued peace and prosperity."

== Domestic life ==
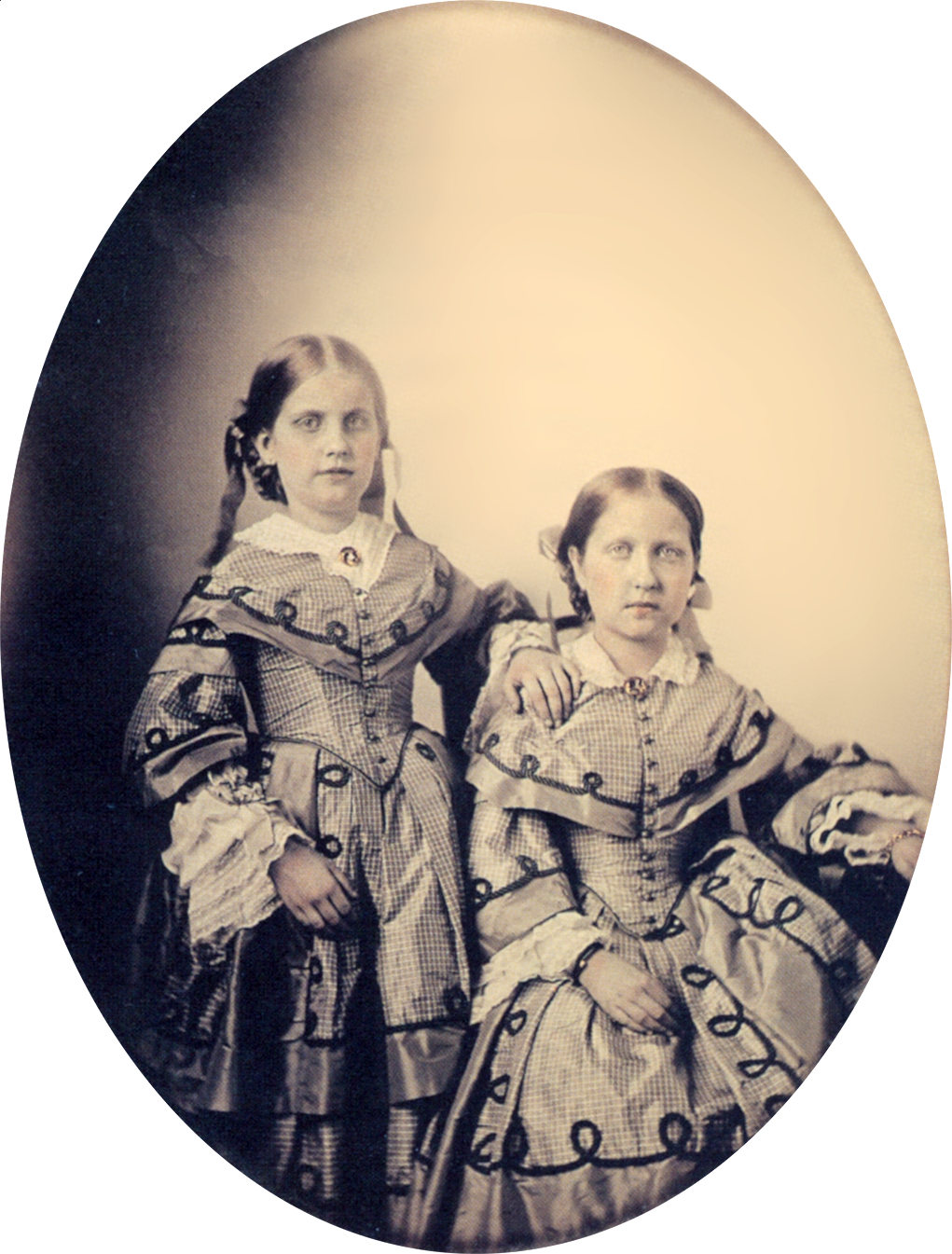
Pedro II's surviving children in 1855: Princesses Leopoldina and Isabel (seated).

The marriage between Pedro II and D. Teresa Cristina started off badly. With maturity, patience, and their first child, Afonso, their relationship improved. Later Teresa gave birth to more children: Isabel, in 1846; Leopoldina, in 1847; and lastly, Pedro, in 1848. However, both boys died when very young, and the Emperor was devastated. Beyond suffering as a father, his view of the Empire's future changed completely. Despite his affection for his daughters, he did not believe that Princess Isabel, though his heir, would have any chance of prospering on the throne. "To be viable his successor had to be a man." He increasingly saw the Imperial system as being tied so inextricably to himself, that it would not survive him. D. Isabel and her sister received exceptional educations, though they were given no preparation for governing the nation. Pedro II excluded Isabel from participation in government business and decisions.

The Imperial couple's sexual relationship apparently ended around 1850, when Pedro II began having affairs with other women. The most famous of these was Luísa Margarida Portugal de Barros, Countess of Barral, who had become governess to the emperor's daughters in August 1856. None of his dalliances impinged upon the Emperor's public life, and he successfully managed to keep his extramarital affairs from becoming common knowledge to any but a very few. None of his mistresses were ever allowed to rise to the position of a favourite. He only allowed himself to become close to those men and women who had shown no inclination for seeking influence or advancement, and he continued to act with some reserve even to these few.

Throughout his life, the Emperor held onto a hope of finding a soulmate, something he felt cheated of due to the necessity of a marriage of state to a woman for whom he never felt passion. This is but one instance illustrating the Emperor's dual identity: who on one hand was "Dom Pedro II" who assiduously carried out his duty in the role of Emperor which destiny had assigned to him, and who on the other hand was "Pedro de Alcântara" who considered the Imperial office an unrewarding burden and who was happier in the worlds of literature and science. Pedro II was what would today be termed a workaholic, and his routine was demanding. He usually woke up at 7 am and did not sleep before 2:00 in the morning. His entire day was devoted to the affairs of state and the meager free time available was spent reading and studying. The Emperor went about his daily routine dressed in a simple black tail coat, trousers, and cravat. For special occasions he would wear court dress, and he only appeared in full regalia (that is with crown, mantle, scepter, etc.) twice each year at the opening and closing of the National Assembly.

Pedro II was credited with being impartial, honest and ethical. Moreover, he was seen as holding politicians and government officials to the strict standards which he exemplified. The Emperor demanded politicians work at least an eight-hour day and adopted a strict policy for the selection of civil servants based on morality and merit. To set the standard, he lived simply. Balls and assemblies of the Court ceased after 1852. He also refused to request or allow the amount of his civil list to be raised from 1840, when it represented 3% of the government expenditures, until 1889, when it had fallen to 0.5%. He refused luxury, once explaining: "I believe that useless expenditure is robbing the Nation".

== Patron of arts and sciences ==
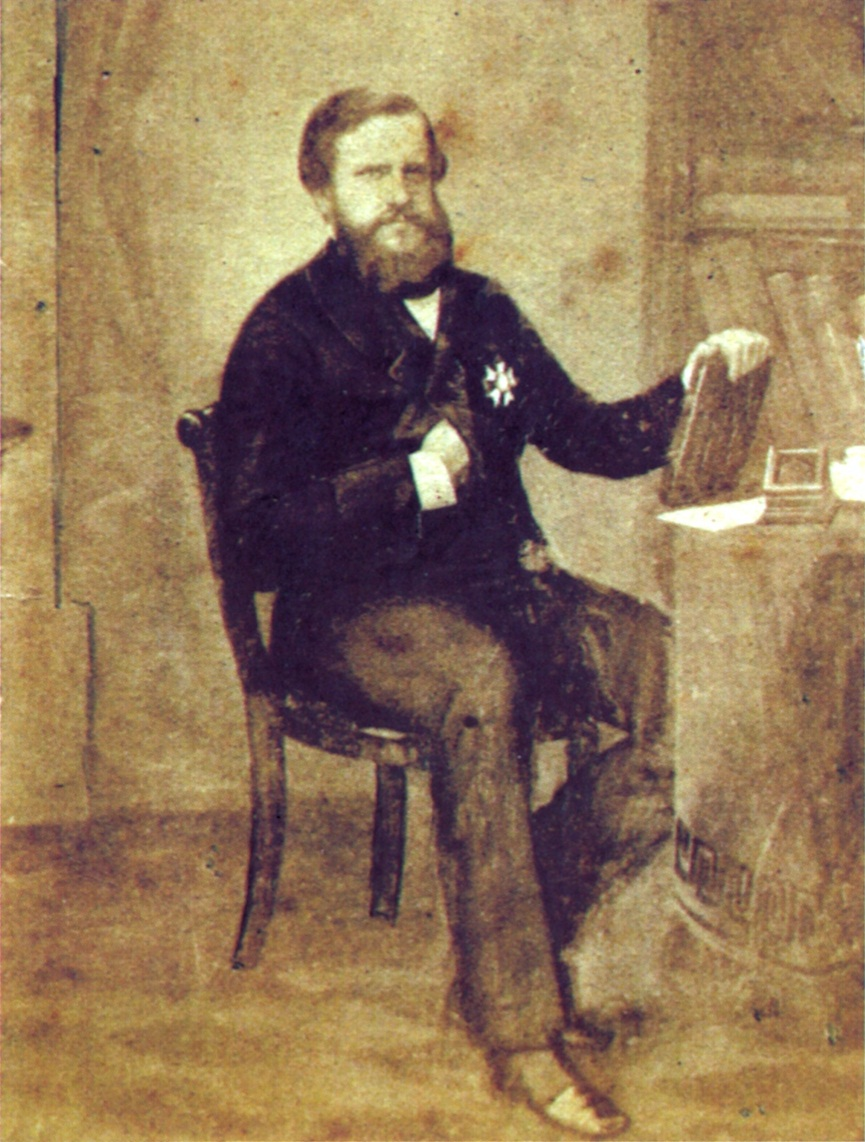
Pedro II around age 32, c. 1858. Beginning in the 1850s, books become a constant feature in his photographs, reinforcing his image as a sponsor of knowledge and learning.

"I was born to devote myself to culture and sciences", the Emperor remarked in his private journal during 1862. He had always been eager to learn and found in books a refuge from the demands of his position. His ability to recall passages which he had read in the past was both notable and noted. Subjects which interested Pedro II were wide-ranging, including anthropology, history, geography, geology, medicine, law, religious studies, philosophy, painting, sculpture, theater, music, chemistry, physics, astronomy, poetry, technology, among others. By the end of his reign, there were three libraries in São Cristóvão palace containing more than 60,000 volumes. A passion for linguistics prompted him throughout his life to study new languages, and he was able to speak and write not only Portuguese but also Latin, French, German, English, Italian, Spanish, Greek, Arabic, Hebrew, Sanskrit, Chinese, Occitan and Tupi. He became the first Brazilian photographer when he acquired a daguerreotype camera in March 1840. He set up one laboratory in São Cristóvão devoted to photography and another to chemistry and physics. He also had an astronomical observatory constructed.

The Emperor's erudition amazed Friedrich Nietzsche when both met. Victor Hugo told him: "Sire, you are a great citizen, you are the grandson of Marcus Aurelius", and Alexandre Herculano called him: "A Prince whom the general opinion holds as the foremost of his era because of his gifted mind, and due to the constant application of that gift to the sciences and culture." He was elected member of the Royal Society, the Russian Academy of Sciences, The Royal Academies for Science and the Arts of Belgium, the American Geographical Society, and the French Academy of Sciences, an honor previously granted to only two other heads of state: Peter the Great and Napoleon Bonaparte. Pedro II exchanged letters with scientists, philosophers, musicians and other intellectuals. A number of his correspondents became his friends, including Richard Wagner, Louis Pasteur, Louis Agassiz, John Greenleaf Whittier, Michel Eugène Chevreul, Henry Wadsworth Longfellow, Arthur de Gobineau, Frédéric Mistral, Alessandro Manzoni, Alexandre Herculano, Camilo Castelo Branco and James Cooley Fletcher.

Pedro II early realized that he had an opportunity to put the knowledge he was accumulating to practical use for Brazil's benefit. Equating knowledge with progress, he considered education to be a vital component of good citizenship and himself provided an example of the value of learning. As the populace looked to the Emperor as a role-model, his position greatly aided the advancement of education. He believed, in his own words, that education was "the most solid basis of the civilization of a nation" and also remarked: "Were I not an emperor, I would like to be a teacher. I do not know of a task more noble than to direct young minds and prepare the men of tomorrow."

Advancing education would also help him toward another of his far-reaching goals: to create a sense of Brazilian nationhood—to form its own image, its own cultural identity. His reign saw the creation of the Brazilian Historic and Geographic Institute to promote research and preservation in the historical, geographical, cultural and social sciences. The Imperial Academy of Music and National Opera and the Pedro II School were also founded, the latter serving as a model for schools throughout Brazil. The Imperial Academy of the Fine Arts, established by his father, received further strengthening and support. Pedro II, with funds from his civil list, personally provided scholarships for Brazilian students to study at universities, art schools and conservatories of music in Europe. He also financed the creation of the Institute Pasteur, helped underwrite the construction of Wagner's Bayreuth Festspielhaus, as well as subscribing to similar projects. His efforts were recognized both at home and abroad. Charles Darwin said of him: "The Emperor does so much for science, that every scientific man is bound to show him the utmost respect".

== Popularity and clash with the British Empire ==
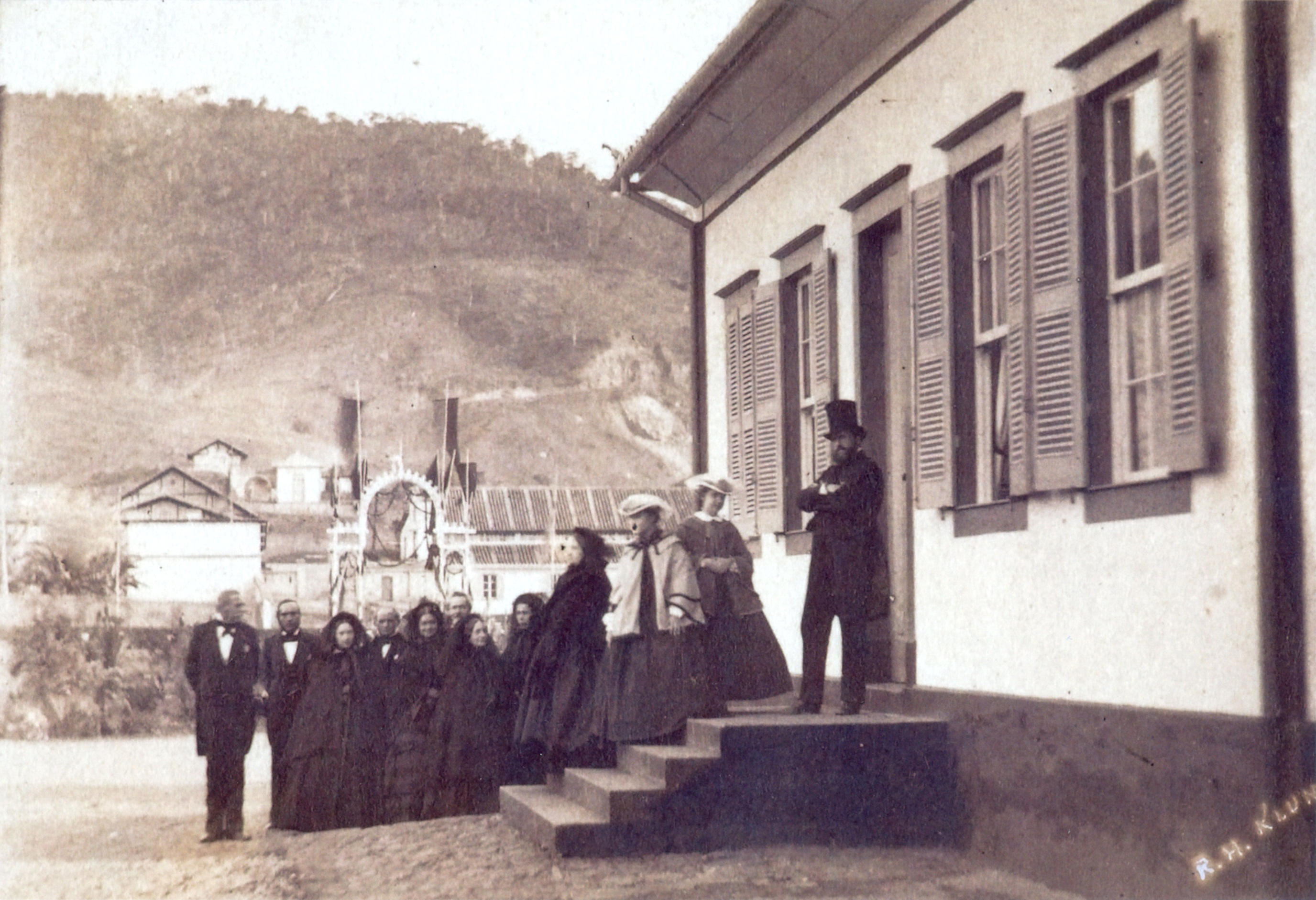
Pedro II at age 35 along with his wife and daughters visiting a farm in southern Minas Gerais province, 1861

At the end of 1859, Pedro II departed on a trip to provinces north of the capital, visiting Espírito Santo, Bahia, Sergipe, Alagoas, Pernambuco and Paraíba. He returned in February 1860 after four months. The trip was a huge success, with the Emperor welcomed everywhere with warmth and joy. The first half of the 1860s saw peace and prosperity in Brazil. Civil liberties had been maintained, freedom of speech being one of the most important, having existed in Brazil since independence and having been strongly defended by Pedro II. The Emperor found newspapers from the capital and from the provinces an ideal way to keep track of public opinion and the nation's overall situation.

Another means of monitoring the Empire was through direct contacts with his subjects. One opportunity for this was during regular Tuesday and Saturday public audiences, where anyone of any social class (including slaves) could gain admittance and present their petitions and stories. Visits to schools, colleges, prisons, exhibitions, factories, barracks, and other public appearances presented another opportunity to gather first-hand information.

He was a monarch who did not hesitate to rise from the throne to help retrieve items dropped by an elderly female former slave, one who happily clapped the shoulder of a former slave attending school to learn how to write and read, and who received simple folk on the verandah of São Cristóvão palace outside the normal hours for public audiences to hear their grievances. He talked with everyone and was sincerely interested in listening to the story of each. However, he "was careful in his words and guarded in his opinions." His simplicity made him ever more beloved by his people, building up the image of a kindly father-figure in the popular imagination.

This tranquility disappeared when the British consul in Rio de Janeiro, William Dougal Christie, nearly sparked a war between his nation and Brazil. Christie, who believed in Gunboat diplomacy, sent an ultimatum containing abusive demands arising out of two minor incidents at the end of 1861 and beginning of 1862. The first was the sinking of a commercial barque on the coast of Rio Grande do Sul after which its goods were pillaged by local inhabitants. The second was the arrest of drunken British officers who were causing a disturbance in the streets of Rio. The Brazilian government refused to yield, and Christie issued orders for British warships to capture Brazilian merchant vessels as indemnity. Brazil's Navy prepared for imminent conflict, purchase of coastal artillery was ordered, several ironclads were authorized and coastal defenses were given permission to fire upon any British warship that tried to capture Brazilian merchant ships. Pedro II was the main reason for Brazil's resistance, he rejected any suggestion of yielding. This response came as a surprise to Christie, who changed his tenor and proposed a peaceful settlement through international arbitration. The Brazilian government presented its demands and, upon seeing the British government's position weaken, severed diplomatic ties with Britain in June 1863.
