= Mesita =

Mesita may refer to:

- Mesita, Colorado
- Mesita, New Mexico
- Mesita (musical project)
- Casa Mesita, two separate non-profit organizations in Los Alamos, New Mexico
- MESITA, a nuclear detonation test conducted as part or Operation Toggle on May 9, 1973

== See also ==
- Meseta (disambiguation)
