= Ovid Butler =

American lawyer, newspaper publisher, and university founder

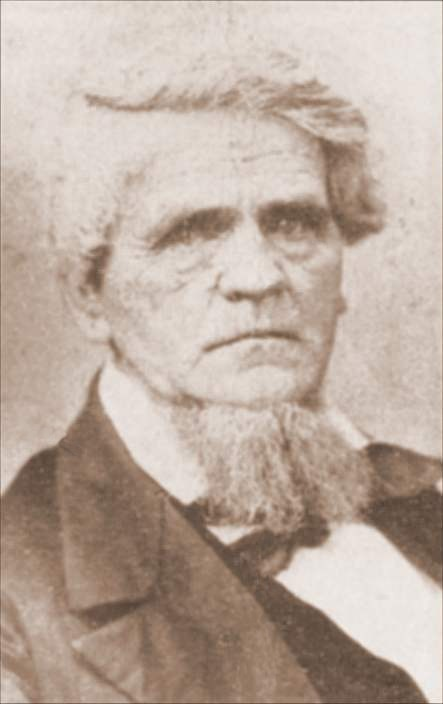
- Born: February 7, 1801; Augusta, New York, US
- Died: July 12, 1881 (aged 80); Indianapolis, Indiana, U.S.
- Resting place: Crown Hill Cemetery and Arboretum, Section 6, Lot 14; 39.8199708°N 86.1746097°W
- Occupations: Lawyer, newspaper publisher
- Known for: Namesake of Butler University
- Spouses: Cordelia Dyer Butler (m. 1825; died 1838) Elizabeth A. Elgin (m. 1840)
- Children: 10

Ovid Butler (February 7, 1801 – July 12, 1881) was an American attorney, newspaper publisher, abolitionist, and university founder from the state of Indiana. Butler University in Indianapolis, Indiana, is named after him.

== Personal life ==
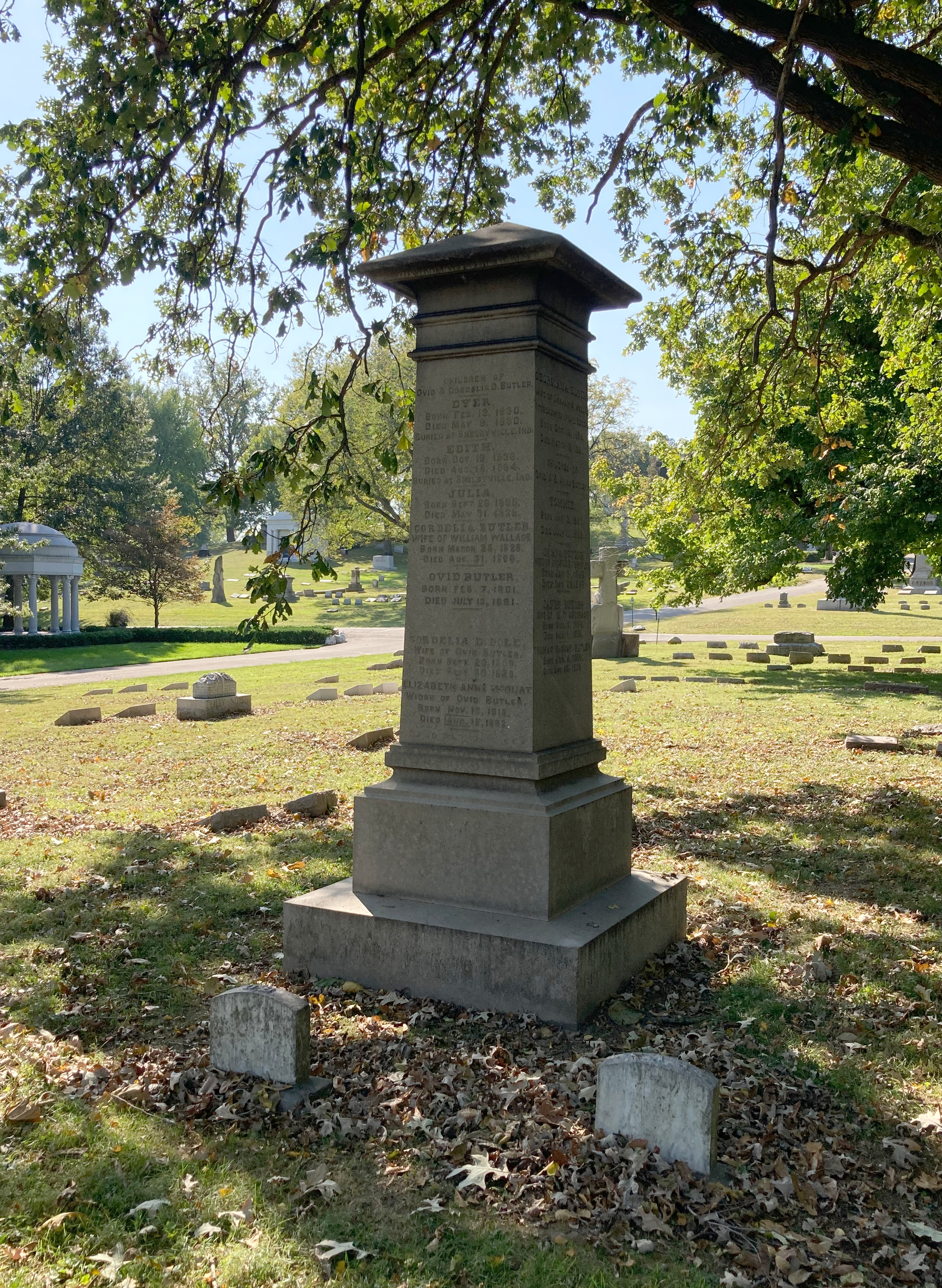
Butler's grave at Crown Hill Cemetery

Butler was born in Augusta, New York, on February 7, 1801. His father, Chancey Butler, moved the family west to Jennings County, Indiana, in 1817. The elder Butler became one of the first Restoration Movement or Stone-Campbell Movement preachers in Indiana. Butler studied law and practiced as an attorney in Shelbyville, Indiana, from 1825 to 1836. He was also an abolitionist. Butler University was dedicated to him in 1855. During this time he married Cordelia Cole. With Cordelia, Butler had three children.

In 1836, the entire family moved to Indianapolis. Soon after, Butler's wife, Cordelia, died in 1838. He then married Elizabeth A. Elgin, daughter of Thomas McOuat. Elgin and Butler had seven children together, one of which died in infancy.

Butler died on July 12, 1881, in Indianapolis, Indiana. He is buried in the Crown Hill Cemetery. His widow Elizabeth died a year later in 1882 at the age of 63.

== Career ==
In Indianapolis, Butler established a law firm with partners Calvin Fletcher, Simon Yandes and future Indianapolis mayor, Horatio C. Newcomb. He became interested and active in political and social issues. Butler held a firm opposition to slavery on moral and religious grounds, which was reflected in his creation of the political, abolitionist newspaper Free Soil Banner in 1849. That same year he gave up his law practice and sought early retirement due to poor health.

== Butler University ==
As a member of the Christian Church (Disciples of Christ), Butler sought to establish a university for that Christian movement. On January 15, 1850, the Indiana General Assembly approved the university. On November 1, 1855, the North Western Christian University opened. Ovid Butler served as the head of the Board of Directors until 1871. He became Chancellor of the University and in 1877, the school became Butler University.

== Recreation ==
Butler's summer months were spent at Indiana's Lake Wawasee where he had a residence in the vicinity of Vawter Park Village.
