= Horace Mann Public School No. 13 =

- U.S. National Register of Historic Places
- U.S. Historic district – Contributing property
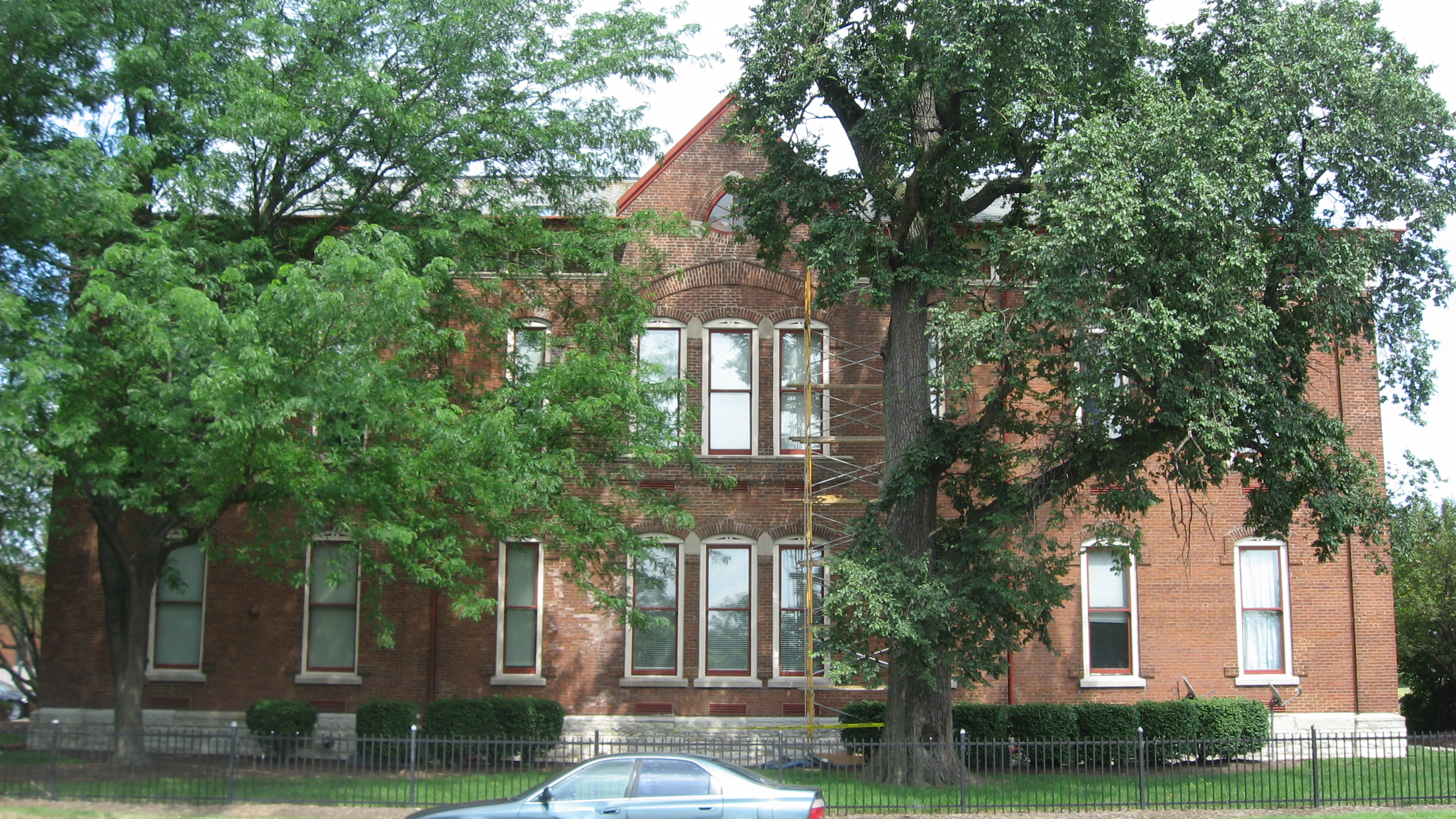
- Horace Mann Public School No. 13, July 2011

- Location within Indianapolis Location within Indianapolis Location within Indiana Location within the United States
- Location: 714 E. Buchanan St., Indianapolis, Indiana
- Coordinates: 39°45′15″N 86°8′47″W
- Area: less than one acre
- Built: 1873, 1918
- Built by: Fatout Brothers
- Architect: May, Edwin
- Architectural style: Italianate
- NRHP reference No.: 86001389
- Added to NRHP: June 26, 1986

Horace Mann Public School No. 13 is a historic school building located at Indianapolis, Indiana. It was designed by architect Edwin May (1823–1880) and built in 1873. It is a two-story, square plan, Italianate style red brick building. It has an ashlar limestone foundation and a low hipped roof with a central gabled dormer. A boiler house was added to the property in 1918.

It was listed on the National Register of Historic Places in 1986. It is located in the Holy Rosary-Danish Church Historic District.

== See also ==
- National Register of Historic Places listings in Center Township, Marion County, Indiana
