= Meseta =

Meseta (Spanish for plateau) may refer to:

== Geology ==
- Any geological domain consisting of reliefs of the mesa (plateau) type
- Meseta Central ("Inner Plateau"), the high plains of central Spain
- La Meseta Formation, a geological formation and major fossil site in Antarctica
- Meseta (volcano), a partially collapsed volcanic vent of Volcán de Fuego in Guatemala
- Moroccan Meseta Mountains, the orogenic belt of the Moroccan coastal block between the Atlantic Margin and the Middle Atlas

== Other ==
- Mesetas, a municipality in Colombia
- Meseta, a fictional currency of the Phantasy Star video game series

== See also ==
- Mesita (disambiguation)
