= Daniel Parish Kidder =

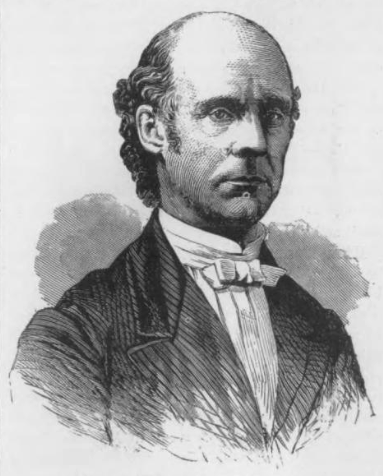
- Born: October 18, 1815; Darien, New York
- Died: July 29, 1891 (aged 75); Evanston, Illinois
- Burial place: Rosehill Cemetery
- Education: Wesleyan University
- Occupations: Missionary, writer

Daniel Parish Kidder (October 18, 1815 – July 29, 1891) was an American Methodist Episcopal theologian and writer who spent several years in Brazil.

== Biography ==
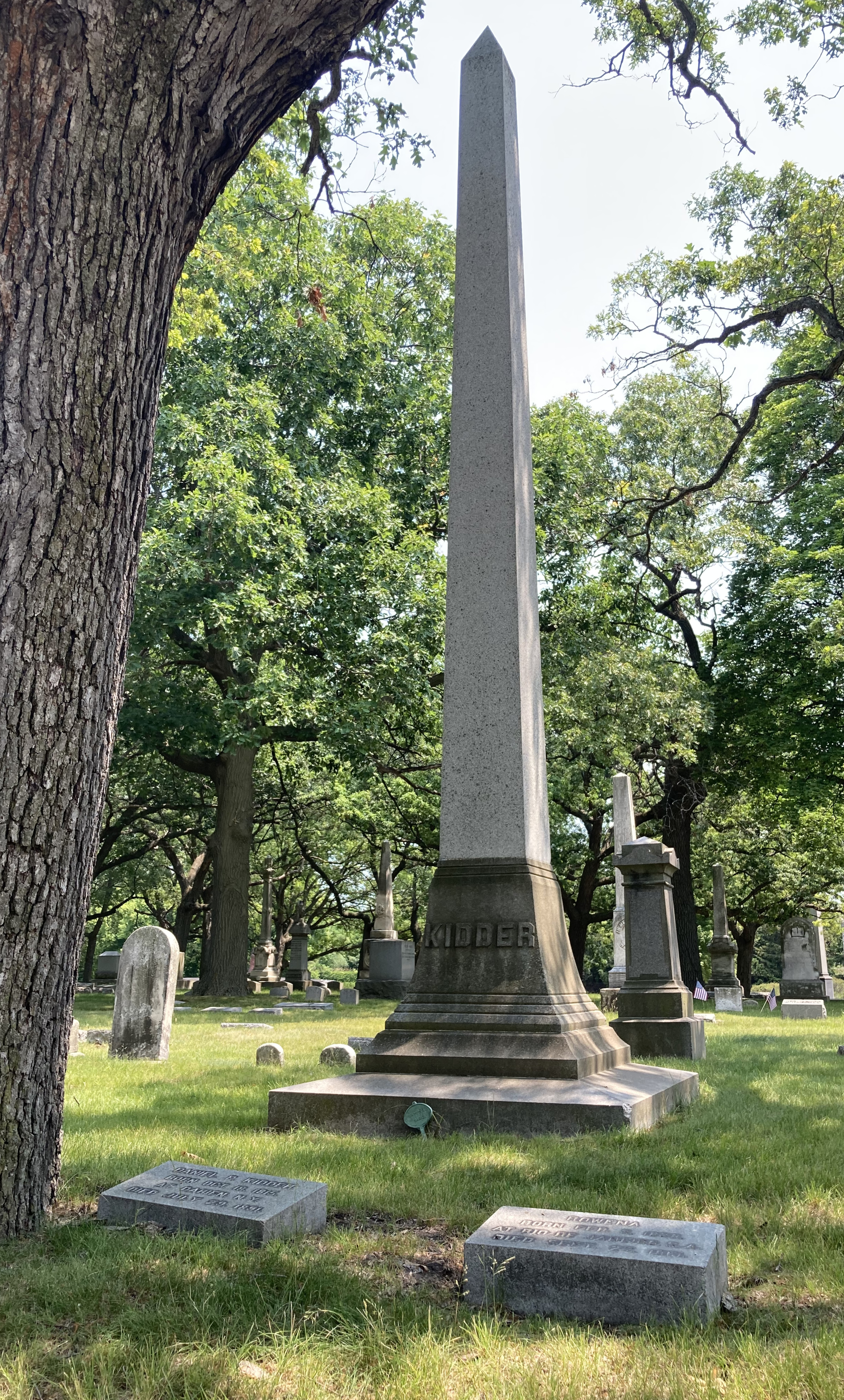
Kidder's grave at Rosehill Cemetery

Kidder was born in Darien, New York on October 18, 1815. He graduated from Wesleyan University in 1836, entered the ministry, and in 1837 went to Brazil to work as a missionary on the Northeast and the Amazon.

After his return to the United States in 1840, he served as a corresponding secretary of the Methodist Sunday School Union and editor of Sunday-school publications and tracts (1844–57), as professor of homiletics in Garrett Biblical Institute for 15 years and in Drew Theological Seminary for 10 years, and as secretary of the board of education of his church (1880–87). The rest of his life was spent in Evanston, Illinois.

He died at his home in Evanston on July 29, 1891, and was buried at Rosehill Cemetery.

== Bibliography ==
Kidder's Treatise on Homiletics (1864, 1884) and The Christian Pastorate (1871) are the books for which he is best known. Others include:

- Mormonism and the Mormons (1844)
- Sketches of Residence and Travel in Brazil (two volumes, 1845)
- Brazil and the Brazilians Portrayed in Historical and Descriptive Sketches (eighth edition, 1868) (with James Cooley Fletcher)
- The Fratricide "Reminiscences of The West India Islands (1851 Second Series, No.1) Published by Lane & Scott
- The Sunday-Scholar's Mirror: A Monthly Magazine for Children editor, 1850–1854.
