= Holy Rosary–Danish Church Historic District =

Historic district in Indianapolis, Indiana, US

- U.S. National Register of Historic Places
- U.S. Historic district
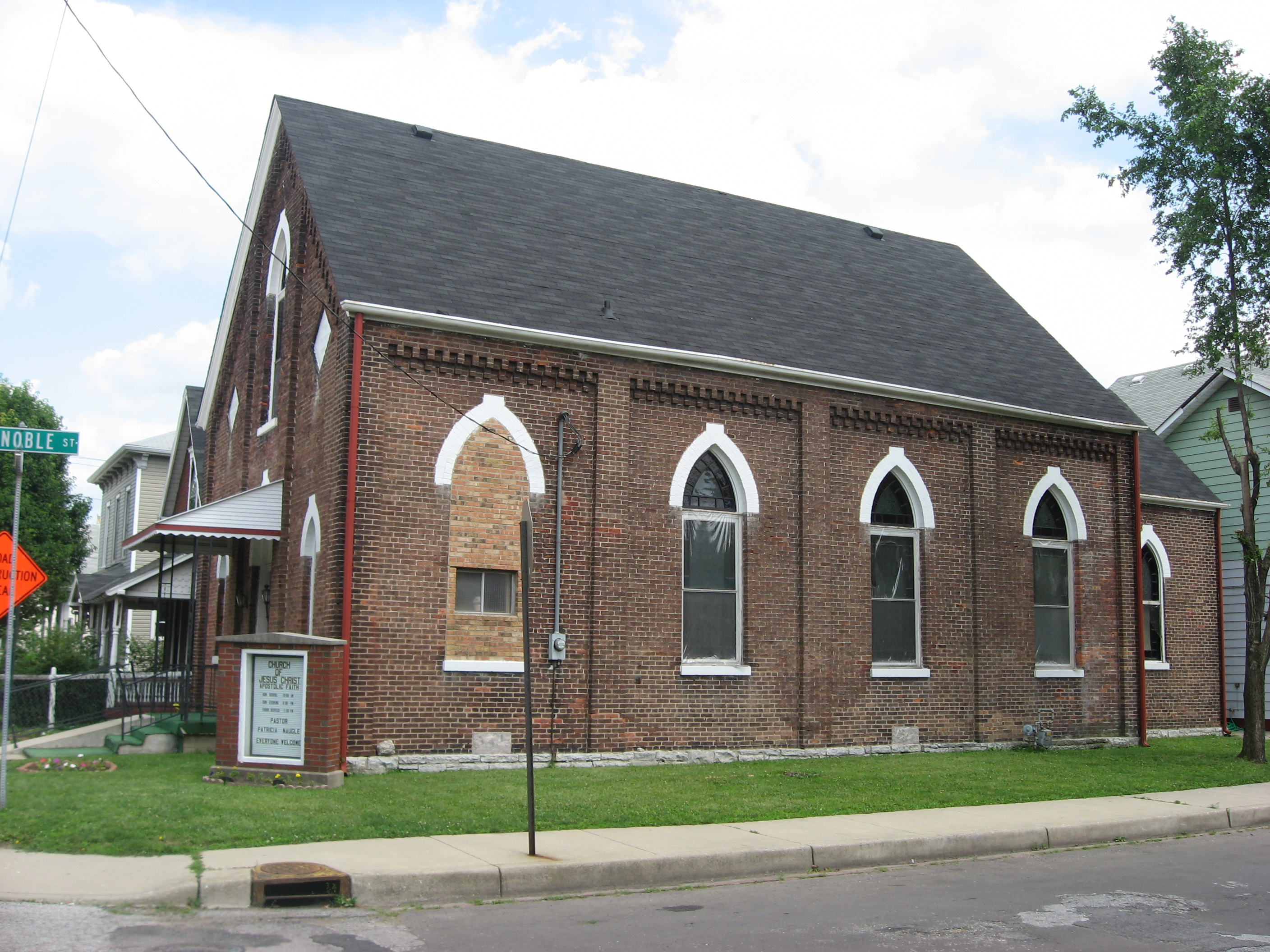
- Former Trinity Danish Lutheran Church in Indianapolis, July 2011

- Location within Indianapolis Location within Indianapolis Location within Indiana Location within the United States
- Location: Roughly bounded by Virginia Ave., I-65/70, and S. East St., Indianapolis, Indiana
- Coordinates: 39°45′23″N 86°08′50″W
- Area: 49 acres (20 ha)
- Built: 1875
- Architect: Multiple
- Architectural style: Mixed (more Than 2 Styles From Different Periods), Carpenter-Builder Cottage
- NRHP reference No.: 86000327
- Added to NRHP: March 13, 1986

Holy Rosary–Danish Church Historic District, also known as Fletcher Place II, is a national historic district located at Indianapolis, Indiana. The district encompasses 183 contributing buildings in a predominantly residential section located in the central business district of Indianapolis. It was developed between about 1875 and 1930, and include representative examples of Italianate, Gothic Revival, Tudor Revival, and Renaissance Revival style architecture. Located in the district is the separately listed Horace Mann Public School No. 13. Other notable buildings include the John Kring House (c. 1872), Trinity Danish Evangelical Lutheran Church (1872), John Wands House (1857), Henry Homburg House (c. 1870), Samuel Keely House (c. 1870), Maria Wuensch Cottage (c. 1900), and Holy Rosary Catholic Church (1911–1925).

It was listed on the National Register of Historic Places in 1986.

== See also ==
- National Register of Historic Places listings in Center Township, Marion County, Indiana
