= James Cooley (diplomat) =

American diplomat

James Cooley (1791–1828) was the first Chargé d'Affaires of the United States in Peru. Cooley was appointed on May 2, 1826 but did not arrive until 1827, after being designated by the Secretary of State Henry Clay. as the first. He was charged with “promoting free trade, implementing a policy of preferential tariffs and broadening bilateral relations.”

Cooley died in Peru on February 24, 1828.
