= Mesita (musical project) =

American indie rock musical project

- Origin: Littleton, Colorado, United States
- Genres: Indie rock
- Years active: 2008–present
- Labels: Unsigned
- Members: James Cooley
- Website: mesitamusic.com

Mesita is the musical project of James Cooley, a musician who grew up in Littleton, Colorado, and is now based in Brooklyn.

== History ==
Cooley writes, performs, and produces all of the music under the Mesita moniker himself. The project began in 2008 when he released the debut album Cherry Blossoms. He released the album Here's To Nowhere in 2011 and The Coyote the following year. 2013 saw the release of the fourth full-length Mesita album Future Proof.

Mesita is featured on episodes of Skins (North American TV series) as well as Mistresses (U.S. TV series). The track "Somewhere Else" is featured on the first compilation from popular YouTube music channel Majestic Casual.

In 2020, Mesita contributed production with Monte Booker for the song "Judas" (with JID featuring Ari Lennox, Buddy, Chance the Rapper and Masego) on the album Spilligion by American hip hop collective Spillage Village.

== Discography ==
=== Albums ===
- Cherry Blossoms (June 17, 2008), self-released
- Here's To Nowhere (March 25, 2011), self-released
- The Coyote (April 3, 2012), self-released
- Future Proof (October 8, 2013), self-released
- The Phoenix (December 30, 2014), self-released
- With Love, from Laniakea (June, 2016), self-released
- Littleton (March, 2018), self-released
- You Are Beautiful (September 30, 2019), self-released
- Eat Ass or Die Trying Deluxe (January 17, 2020), self-released
- Empty Island (August 21, 2020), self-released
- Life Is Flashing Before My Eyes One Day at a Time (April 6, 2021), self-released
- You're Still Beautiful (October 29, 2021), self-released
- am i still beautiful (May 13, 2022), self-released

=== EPs ===
- No Worries EP (July 31, 2009), self-released
- Living/Breathing EP (November 30, 2010), self-released
- Small Table EP (February 16, 2016), self-released
- Mall Music EP (March 15, 2017), self-released
- Repackaged Trash EP (December 18, 2018), self-released
- Blackwhite EP (October 17, 2019), self-released
