= James Cooley Fletcher =

Presbyterian minister and missionary (1823–1901)

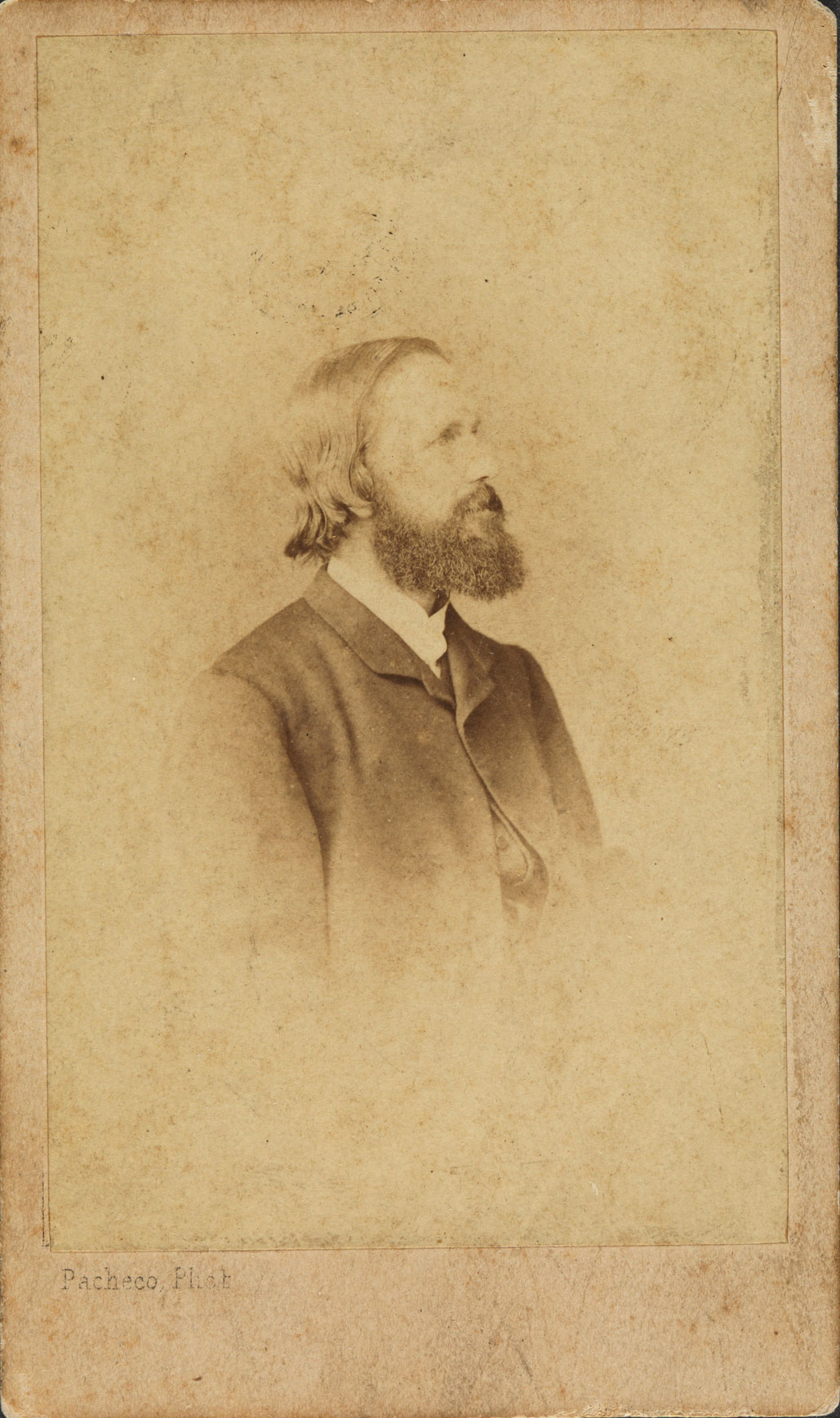
- Born: 1823
- Died: 1901 (aged 77–78)
- Occupation: Minister, missionary, writer

James Cooley Fletcher (1823–1901) was an American Presbyterian minister and missionary active in Brazil.

== Life ==
He was born in Indianapolis, the son of Calvin Fletcher, a banker and one of the first settlers of Indiana. James Cooley Fletcher graduated from Brown University in 1846, and studied theology for two years in the Princeton Theological Seminary under Charles Hodge. His studies were completed in Europe, as he sought to improve his French in order to become a missionary in Haiti. In that period, he married Henriette Malan, a daughter of César Malan, a minister from Geneva.

In 1852 he went to Rio de Janeiro (the then capital of Brazil) as an agent of both the American Christian Union and American Seamen's Friend Society. The American Christian Union worked together with the American Bible Society and the American Tract Society. He went back to the US in 1854, shortly after his daughter Julia Constance Fletcher was born.

In 1855, Fletcher went back to Brazil as an agent of the American Sunday School Union. During this trip he traveled more than 5,000 kilometers through Brazil, giving out Bibles. His travels to Brazil, added to the experiences of the Methodist minister and missionary Daniel Parish Kidder, became the focus of a book in 1857, Brazil and the Brazilians Portrayed in Historical and Descriptive Sketches, a pioneering depiction of Brazil for the American people, with at least eight editions.

In 1862, Fletcher sailed more than 3,000 kilometers along the Amazon river to collect species for professor Louis Agassiz. This resulted in the Agassiz expedition of 1865. In 1864 and 1865, Fletcher and the liberal Brazilian politician Aureliano Cândido Tavares Bastos convinced the governors of Brazil and the US to set up a steamboat line between Rio de Janeiro and New York. Influenced by Fletcher, Aureliano and other Brazilian politicians tried and in some cases managed to make many political, social and economic reforms in Brazil; they also encouraged European and North American migrants.

In 1868 and 1869, Fletcher worked as an agent for the American Tract Society. This would be his last journey to Brazil. Thereafter he was nominated consul at Oporto, Portugal, between 1869 and 1873, and was a missionary in Naples, Italy between 1873 and 1877. In 1877, he returned to Indianapolis, where he settled. His daughter stayed in Italy, where she became a prolific writer with the pen name George Fleming.

Fletcher left many important friends in Brazil, including liberal politicians and intellectuals as well as the emperor Dom Pedro II. He worked as a North American diplomatic secretary, and his book left a strong image of Brazil in the US. In Brazil, he left behind a strong desire for Protestant and Anglo-Saxon values.
