= 1916 United States Senate election in Indiana =

- November 7, 1916
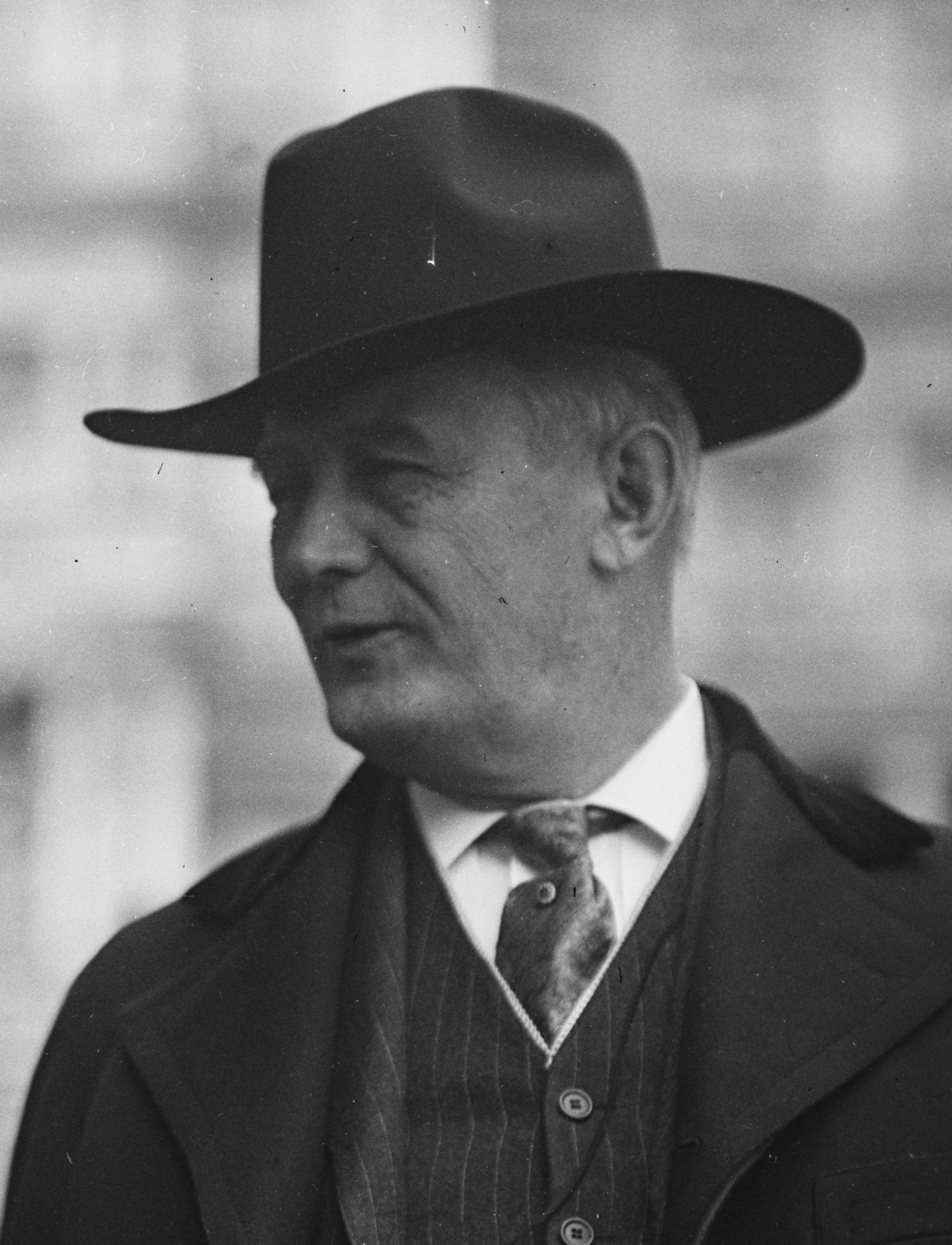

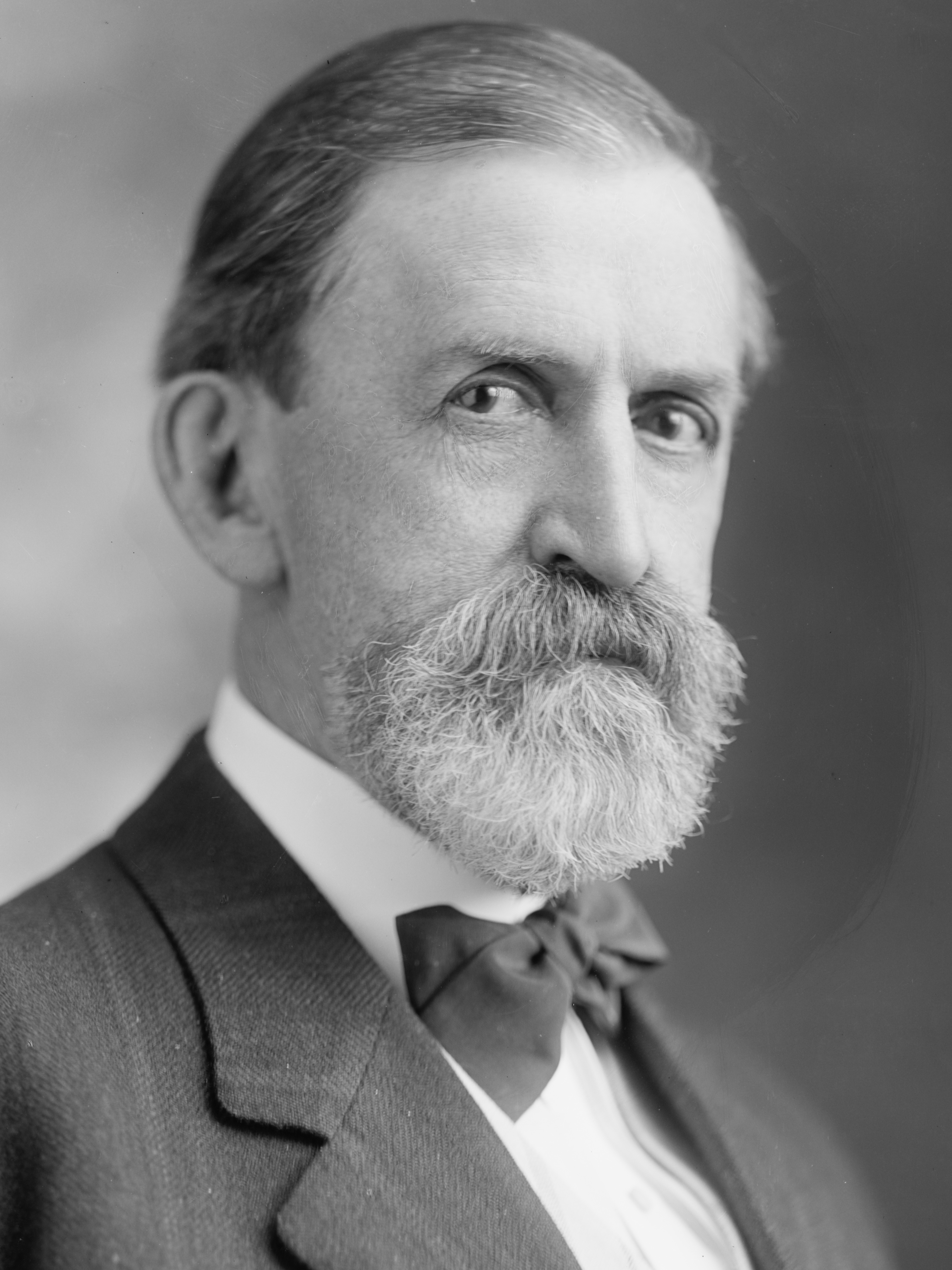
Nominee	Harry New	John W. Kern
Party	Republican	Democratic
Popular vote	337,089	325,588
Percentage	47.77%	46.14%
- County results New: 40–50% 50–60% 60–70% Kern: 40–50% 50–60% 60–70%
U.S. senator before election
John W. Kern
Democratic
Elected U.S. Senator
Harry New
Republican

The 1916 United States Senate election in Indiana took place on November 7, 1916. Democratic incumbent and Senate majority leader John W. Kern ran for re-election to a second term in office, but he was defeated by Harry S. New, former chairman of the Republican National Committee.

== Background ==
In 1911, John W. Kern was elected to a six-year term in the United States Senate by the newly elected Indiana General Assembly. Kern, a former state senator and city solicitor of Indianapolis, had been an unsuccessful candidate for governor of Indiana and vice president of the United States in 1908. He was the last Indiana senator to be elected by the legislature prior to the adoption of the Seventeenth Amendment to the United States Constitution, which mandated direct election of all senators.

In 1912, the Democratic Party won the presidency and narrow control of the Senate. President-elect Woodrow Wilson worked closely with Kern, who was elevated to the role of Democratic conference chairman (and de facto Senate majority leader), to pass his progressive legislative agenda through the Senate.

In January 1915, Wilson announced his campaign for re-election to the presidency in Indianapolis. Contemporary reporting in The New York Times indicated he came at Kern's behest, and Kern was with Wilson continuously during his visit to the state.

== Democratic primary ==
=== Candidates ===
- John W. Kern, incumbent senator since 1911 and Senate majority leader

=== Results ===
1916 Democratic Senate primary
Party	Candidate	Votes	%
Democratic	John W. Kern	151,931	100.00%
Total votes		151,931	100.00%

== Republican primary ==
=== Candidates ===
- Harry Stewart New, former state senator from Indianapolis and former chairman of the Republican National Committee
- Arthur N. Robinson
- James E. Watson, former U.S. representative from Rushville

=== Results ===
Republican primary results
Party	Candidate	Round 1			Round 2	
Party	Candidate	Votes	%	Transfer	Votes	%
Republican	Harry New	97,118	46.07%	+ 3,981	101,099	52.05%
Republican	James Watson	89,847	42.62%	+ 3,273	93,120	47.95%
Republican	Arthur Robinson	23,835	11.31%	23,835	Eliminated	

After losing the primary, Watson ran in the special election for Indiana's other Senate seat caused by the death of Benjamin F. Shively, which he won over Thomas Taggart. Watson would be sworn in as a U.S. senator 3 months before senator-elect New's term began.

== Progressive primary ==
=== Candidates ===
- John N. Dyer, candidate for U.S. representative in 1912

=== Results ===
1916 Progressive Senate primary
Party	Candidate	Votes	%
Progressive	John N. Dyer	7,567	100.00%
Total votes		7,567	100.00%

== General election ==
=== Candidates ===
- Ira J. Decker (Socialist Labor)
- John N. Dyer, candidate for U.S. representative in 1912 (Progressive)
- Elwood Haynes, metallurgist and automotive pioneer (Prohibition)
- John W. Kern, incumbent senator since 1911 and Senate majority leader (Democratic)
- Harry S. New, former state senator from Indianapolis and former chairman of the Republican National Committee (Republican)
- Joseph Zimmerman (Socialist)

=== Campaign ===
The Democratic campaign in Indiana suffered from disorganization and difficulty fundraising at the state and national level, particularly in comparison to the Republican campaign. For example, when the party tried to induce contributions from county organizations, the chair of the Lake County party organization flatly refused and demanded instead that the state party subsidize its organization. In his 1918 biography of Kern, aide Claude G. Bowers attributed these problems to the national party's preference to spend money in the Pennsylvania and state of New York. The state party was also controlled by junior senator Thomas Taggart, who had been an intraparty rival with Kern in patronage disputes and was running for re-election himself. Finally, Kern was personally limited from campaigning on his own behalf by periodic illnesses until October 3. (He would ultimately die of illness less than one year after the election.) Instead, his campaign focused on his celebrating his legislative accomplishments, leadership role, and relationship with President Wilson in the press.

The Republican campaign was led by state party chairman Will Hays, whose success would elevate him to national party chair by 1918. Republicans sought to focus on the tariff and foreign policy, questions that were expected to favor their positions in Indiana, but Kern and the Indiana Democratic Party were able to keep the tariff question out of the campaign, instead focusing on progressive domestic legislation and World War I. Kern's support for labor legislation, including the Keating–Owen Act, which prohibited child labor, and the Adamson Act, protecting benefits for railroad workers, earned him the uniform support of organized labor. The Indiana Federation of Labor endorsed him, and both Samuel Gompers and Mother Jones campaigned for him in Indiana. Despite his strong progressive record, Kern may have had some difficulty attracting progressive voters who were still aggrieved by his defeat of progressive icon Albert J. Beveridge in 1911 and his continuing criticisms of Theodore Roosevelt.

Opinions on Wilson's handling of foreign policy were divided, and the large German American vote in Indiana (and to a lesser extent the Irish American vote), which were opposed to potential American support for the British Empire and France in the war, became a focus for both campaigns. Unlike Wilson, the Indiana Democratic Party avoided directly criticizing "hyphenated Americans" for fear of alienating German American votes; Kern himself emphasized his German heritage and praised Wilson for maintaining American neutrality. Some Republicans feared that their own presidential candidate, Charles Evans Hughes, would alienate German Americans by attacking Wilson for alleged weakness or timidity against threats from the German Empire; others worried that the war made Wilson impervious to direct criticism, for fear of appearing pro-German. They focused instead on Wilson's response to the Mexican Revolution and border raids by Pancho Villa.

In late October, William Jennings Bryan offered to campaign for Kern, who had been Bryan's running mate in 1908. It is unclear why the Kern campaign did not accept the offer, but Bryan's growing association with the temperance movement and the campaign's desire to appease German American brewers, who opposed prohibition of alcohol. Bowers, who complained about the few national speakers who visited Indiana during the campaign, omitted any reference to Bryan's offer in his history of the campaign, although it was preserved in his private papers.

According to historian George C. Roberts, Bowers's complaint was obliquely directed at Wilson. Although he was up for re-election, Wilson ran a front porch campaign, focusing on his management of the neutral American position in World War I and having little enthusiasm for personal partisan campaigning. Wilson did make one visit to Indiana in October, but his presence was ostensibly nonpartisan, and he explicitly rejected an offer for a "political meeting" during the trip.

=== Results ===
1916 U.S. Senate election in Indiana
Party	Candidate	Votes	%
Republican	Harry Stewart New	337,089	47.77%
Democratic	John W. Kern	325,588	46.14%
Socialist	Joseph Zimmerman	21,558	3.06%
Prohibition	Elwood Haynes	15,598	2.21%
Progressive	John N. Dyer	4,272	0.61%
Socialist Labor	Ira J. Decker	1,562	0.22%
Total votes		705,667	100.00%
Republican gain from Democratic			

Kern attributed his loss to the defection of German Americans, particularly brewers who had supported Hughes. He similarly attributed his 1909 loss in the Democratic legislative caucus to the opposition of liquor interests.

Kern outran Taggart in the concurrent special election by eleven votes.

== Aftermath ==
Kern died five months after leaving the Senate.

== See also ==
- 1916 United States Senate elections
