= Lucy M. Taggart =

American painter (1880–1960)

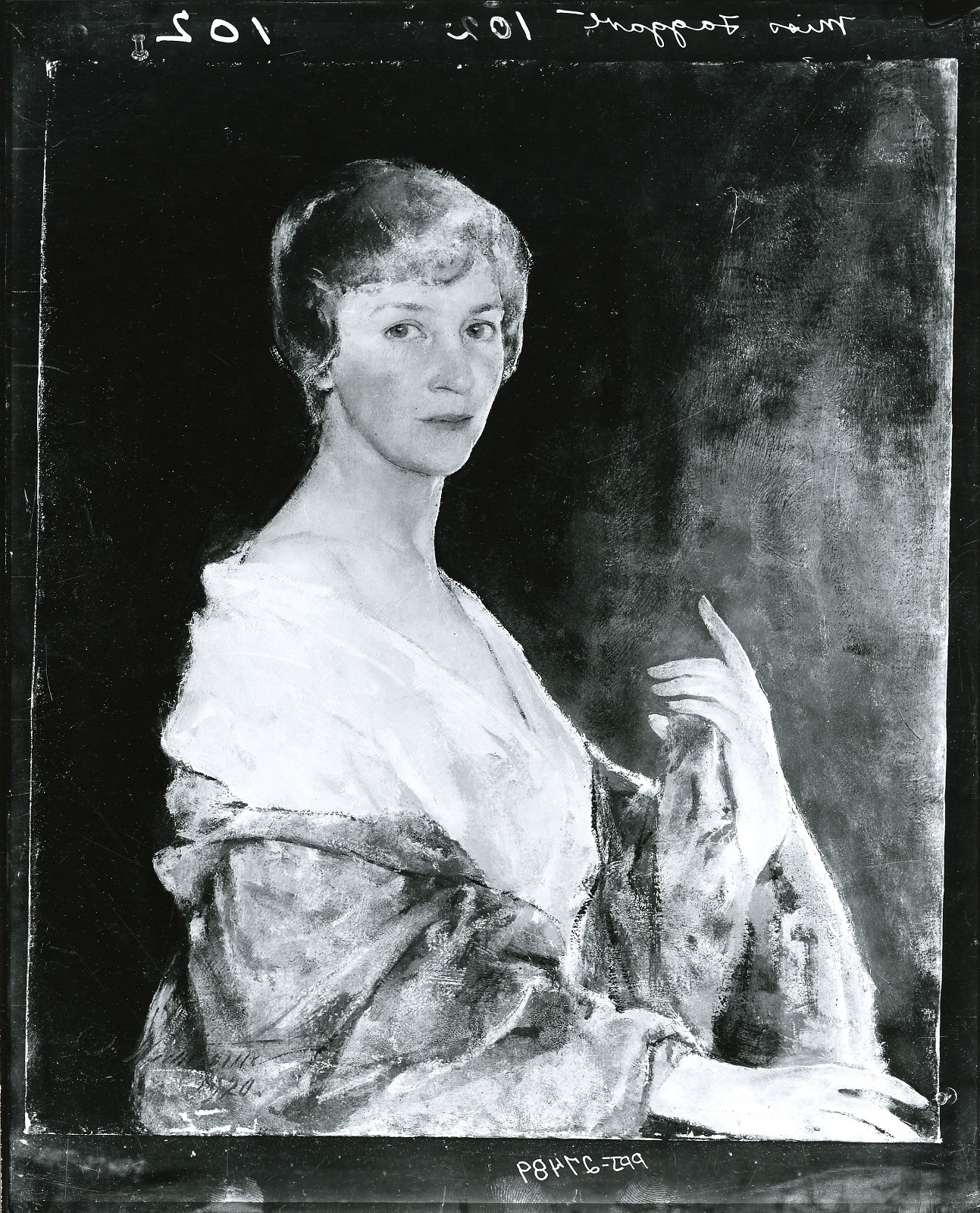
- Lucy Taggart, painted by Charles Webster Hawthorne
- Born: Lucy Martha Taggart; March 7, 1880; Indianapolis, Indiana, U.S.
- Died: October 9, 1960 (aged 80); Indianapolis, Indiana, U.S.
- Resting place: Crown Hill Cemetery, Indianapolis Section 30, Lot 3; 39.81988007°N 86.176615°W
- Occupation(s): Artist and art educator
- Board member of: John Herron Art Institute (1915–58)
- Parent(s): Thomas Taggart; Eva (Bryant) Taggart
- Awards: J. Irving Holcomb Prize (1922), John Herron Art Institute

Lucy Martha Taggart (March 7, 1880 – October 9, 1960) was an artist and art educator from Indianapolis, Indiana, and the daughter of Thomas Taggart, a successful hotelier and influential Indiana politician. Recognized as a talented and versatile artist during a career that spanned the first three decades of the twentieth century, she studied with several noted artists, such as William Merritt Chase, John Henry Twachtman, Kenyon Cox, William Forsyth, Otto Stark, Charles Webster Hawthorne, Cecilia Beaux, and Harriet Whitney Frishmuth. Taggart, who was especially known for her portraiture, received the John Herron Art Institute's J. Irving Holcomb Prize in 1922, the Hoosier Salon's Merit Award for figure composition in 1925, and the Hoosier Salon's Merit Award in 1926 for best picture painted by a woman. Her work is represented in the collections of the Indianapolis Museum of Art.

Taggart sold her art and exhibited at a number of prestigious shows in the Midwest and eastern United States that included the Pennsylvania Academy of Fine Arts, the Society of Western Artists exhibitions, the Grand Central Art Galleries, the National Association of Women Painters and Sculptors, Hoosier Salon exhibitions, and at the John Herron Art Institute. Taggart abandoned her life as a practicing East Coast artist in 1929 and returned to Indianapolis, where she taught painting and portraiture at the Herron Art Institute (1931–34) and served on its board of directors (1915–58). Taggart had a wide circle of friends and acquaintances that included leading artists, authors, and politicians of her era. She was also active in numerous art, civic, and cultural organizations in Indiana and the eastern United States.

== Early life and family ==
Lucy Martha Taggart, born on March 7, 1880, in Indianapolis, Indiana, was the second of Thomas and Eva Dora (Bryant) Taggart's six children. She was named after her mother's aunt, Lucy Viola Inscho Bryant, and her father's mother, Martha Kingsbury Taggart.

Lucy grew up in Indianapolis as a member of a socially and politically prominent family. Her father, Thomas Taggart, is considered the "undisputed boss of the Democratic machine for the first quarter of the twentieth century." He served three terms as the mayor of Indianapolis (1895–1901), as chairman of the Democratic National Committee (1904–1908), and was appointed as a U.S. Senator in 1916, but lost the seat that autumn in a special election. At the time of Lucy's birth, her father was working as a clerk for the N. and G. Ohmer Company's dining hall at Indianapolis's Union Depot. He had immigrated to the United States from Ireland with his parents in 1861 at the age of five and grew up in Xenia, Ohio. Thomas moved to Garrett, Indiana, in 1875 to manage DeKalb House, a depot hotel, and relocated to Indianapolis in 1877. He married Eva Bryant, whom he met at Garrett, in 1878. While living in Indianapolis, Thomas became a successful Indiana politician and hotelier, whose business interests included hotels in Indianapolis and the French Lick Springs Hotel, a renowned mineral spa resort in Orange County, Indiana.

Lucy's siblings included four sisters: Florence Eva (born 1878), Nora (born 1881), Irene Mary (born 1883), and Emily Letitia (born 1888); and one brother, Thomas Douglas (born 1886). Lucy never married and remained close to her family throughout her life.

== Education ==
Taggart developed her artistic talent from childhood and also learned to play the violin. She graduated from May Wright Sewall's Girls' Classical School in Indianapolis. In 1898, when her father was beginning his third term as mayor of Indianapolis, she began her first year at Smith College in Northampton, Massachusetts.

After the death of her older sister, Florence, from a yachting accident in the Gulf of Mexico in 1899, Lucy returned to Indianapolis and became First Daughter of the Indianapolis mayor. In the autumn of 1899 Taggart did not return to college. Instead, the nineteen-year-old moved to New York City to study art. Taggart lived in an apartment on Upper West Side and studied at the Chase Art School with William Merritt Chase, a fellow Hoosier who had been living and working in the city since 1878. She also studied at the Art Students League of New York from 1899 to 1900, where her instructors included John Henry Twachtman, Kenyon Cox, and Walter Appleton Clark.

In addition, Taggart studied with "some of the nation's most able artists." She was among the early students enrolled at the John Herron Art Institute in Indianapolis, where her instructors were William Forsyth and Otto Stark, two of the noted Hoosier Group of painters. At Herron, Taggart attended Forsyth's daytime class in 1906–07, a summer class in 1907, and in the 1908–09 academic year. She also studied with East Coast artists Charles Webster Hawthorne, Cecilia Beaux, and sculptor Harriet Whitney Frishmuth, who became her mentors.

== Career ==
Taggart launched her art career in New York City, where she maintained a studio apartment. She also had a third-floor apartment and art studio at her parents' home at 1331 North Delaware Street in Indianapolis and an art studio at Amyvale, the summer home her parents built in 1915–16 at Hyannis Port, Massachusetts. Taggart also kept a studio at her brother's home, called Mount Airie, near French Lick, Indiana, about two miles from the family's French Lick Springs Hotel.

In 1919 Taggart's father distributed "the bulk of his fortune" to his wife, Eva, and their five children. His generosity provided Lucy with the financial resources to build a substantial summer home of her own. In 1922 and 1924 Taggart leased the estate home of Cecilia Beaux in Gloucester, Massachusetts, before deciding to build a home and studio on harbor-front property in Eastern Point, Massachusetts. Taggart's new home, named Tower of the Four Winds, was completed in 1929. It was designed by Boston architect Ralph Adams Cram in the French farmhouse style; Henry Davis Sleeper designed its interior.

Taggart sold her art and exhibited at a number of prestigious shows in the midwestern and eastern United States throughout the first three decades of the twentieth century. Venues included the Indiana Building at the Louisiana Purchase Exposition in Saint Louis (1904), the Pennsylvania Academy of Fine Arts in Philadelphia (1910 and 1912), at annual exhibitions of the Society of Western Artists in Chicago, Cincinnati, Cleveland, Detroit, Indianapolis, and Saint Louis, the Grand Central Art Galleries in New York (1923), the National Association of Women Painters and Sculptors in New York (1922 and 1936) and in Indianapolis (1923 and 1926), Hoosier Salon exhibitions in Chicago (1925–27, 1929, and 1931), and several exhibitions at the John Herron Art Institute in Indianapolis. In addition, a September landscape by Taggart appeared on the cover of McClure's magazine in 1905. She also arranged exhibitions, including one held in 1929 at her father's French Lick Springs Hotel that included thirty-eight American sculptors. (About a dozen sculptures created by sculptor Harriett Frishmuth, her friend and mentor, were included in the exhibition.)

Between 1925 and 1931 Taggart was a five-time exhibitor in the Hoosier Salon, a juried show that featured the work of Indiana artists. The annual exhibition was held during this period at the Marshall Field and Company's Picture Galleries in Chicago. Taggart's exhibited works included Still Life and Eleanor (1925), Carnival (1926), Summer (1927), Young Girl in Green (1929), and Janet (1931). Eleanor won the Hoosier Salon's Merit Award for figure composition in 1925; Carnival won a Merit Award in 1926 for best picture painted by a woman.

In 1929, the year that her father and sister-in-law died, Taggart abandoned her life as a practicing artist on the East Coast, returned to Indianapolis to care for her mother and the Taggart family home, and became an art teacher. Taggart taught painting and portraiture at the John Herron Art Institute from 1931 to 1934, although her involvement with the Institute began in 1915, when she was elected to the first of several terms as a member of its board of directors. She continued to serve on the board until 1958. Taggart donated her time as a faculty member at the school without compensation. She also served on the school's arts committee, helped raise funds, attracted publicity to the school, and donated artwork.

As the daughter of an influential Indiana politician and a practicing artist in Indiana and the East Coast, Taggart had a wide circle of friends and acquaintances. Because of her family's political connections, Taggart was acquainted with many Hoosier politicians, including U.S. Vice President Thomas R. Marshall, Indiana governors and U.S. Senators such as Samuel M. Ralston, John W. Kern, and Paul V. McNutt, as well as McNutt's wife, Kathleen. Taggart was also a friend of A. Piatt Andrew, a U.S. Congressman from Massachusetts. At the dedication ceremony for the George Rogers Clark Memorial in Vincennes, Indiana, in 1936, she met Franklin D. Roosevelt and Eleanor Roosevelt. Vice President Harry S. Truman visited French Lick just prior to becoming president. Taggart's artist friends and associates included Cecilia Beaux, Charles Hawthorne, Paul Manship, Walker Hancock, Gifford Beal and his brother, Reynolds Beal, Harry Sleeper, and numerous artists in Indiana. She was also a close friend of author and fellow Hoosier Booth Tarkington, as well as his first and second wives, and was godmother to his only child, Laurel.

Throughout her adult life Taggart was active in numerous art associations in Indiana and in the eastern United States, most notably the Art Association of Indianapolis, National Arts Club (New York), American Federation of Arts, North Shore Art Association (East Gloucester, Massachusetts), Grand Central Art Galleries (New York), National Association of Women Painters and Sculptors, Provincetown Art Association, and the Museum of Fine Arts, Boston.

In addition to arts organizations, Taggart was a member of the Women's Committee of the Indianapolis Symphony Orchestra. She played an "influential" role in bringing Fabien Sevitzky, the orchestra's second conductor to Indianapolis. Other memberships included the Indianapolis Dramatic Club, Contemporary Club of Indianapolis, Colonial Dames of America, National Society of Magna Carta Dames, and the Cosmopolitan Club of New York. She was also a member of Saint Paul's Episcopal Church in Indianapolis.

== Later years ==
Taggart became a surrogate mother to her brother's young daughter, Eva, after his wife's death in 1929, and brought the child to Indianapolis to live with her at the Taggart family home. Eva's father remained at French Lick to manage the family's business interests.

On November 7, 1931, at the request of Indianapolis mayor Reginald H. Sullivan, a family friend, Taggart christened the USS Indianapolis at Camden, New Jersey. Commissioned by the U.S. Navy on November 15, 1932, it later transported components for the atomic bomb, code-named Little Boy, through the Pacific Ocean. The ship was destroyed by the Imperial Japanese Navy in one of the worst U.S. naval disasters in history; 880 Americans lost their lives.

After her mother's death in 1937, Taggart became the family matriarch. In the last decade of Taggart's life, declining health caused her to sell the family home in Indianapolis and move into a nearby apartment, but she retained her home at Eastern Point, Massachusetts, and Mount Airie, her brother's home in French Lick, Indiana.

== Death and legacy ==
Taggart died in Indianapolis on October 9, 1960. Her remains are interred near her parents and other members of the family at Crown Hill Cemetery in Indianapolis., Her substantial estate was distributed among her family members.

Taggart lived much of her life in the public spotlight as the daughter of a successful hotelier, Indiana's Democratic political boss, mayor of Indianapolis, and U.S. Senator. Remembered for her "style, grace, wit, and talent," Taggart's many friends and associates included leading artists, authors, and politicians. She was also recognized as a talented and versatile artist in oils, pastels, and watercolors during an artistic career that spanned the first three decades of the twentieth century. A colleague described Taggart as "much too modest about her own work." She was especially known for her portraiture, but Taggart also painted landscapes and still life scenes and created sculptures. As historian Mary Burnet explained, Taggart's portraits depicted her subjects "with a subtle grace, and a wealth of radiant color peculiarly rich in quality." Taggart's artwork is included in private collections and represented in the collections of the Indianapolis Museum of Art.

== Honors and tributes ==
Taggart was the recipient of the J. Irving Holcomb Prize for General Excellence at the John Herron Art Institute's Annual Exhibition of Work by Indiana Artists in 1922.

She was awarded second honorable mention in 1922 and first honorable mention in 1926 for work she exhibited at the Annual Exhibition of Work by Indiana Artists in Richmond, Indiana.

Taggart's painting, Eleanor, won the Hoosier Salon's Merit Award for figure composition in 1925; Carnival won its Merit Award in 1926 for best picture painted by a woman.

== Artworks ==
- Bust of Eva Taggart (1925) at the Indianapolis Museum of Art
- Bust of Tommy T. Young (1924) at the Indianapolis Museum of Art
- Eleanor (1921) at the Indianapolis Museum of Art
- The Lady from Philadelphia
- Landscape with Stream (1902) at the Indianapolis Museum of Art
- Untitled at the Indianapolis Museum of Art
