= 1926 United States Senate election in Indiana =

- November 2, 1926
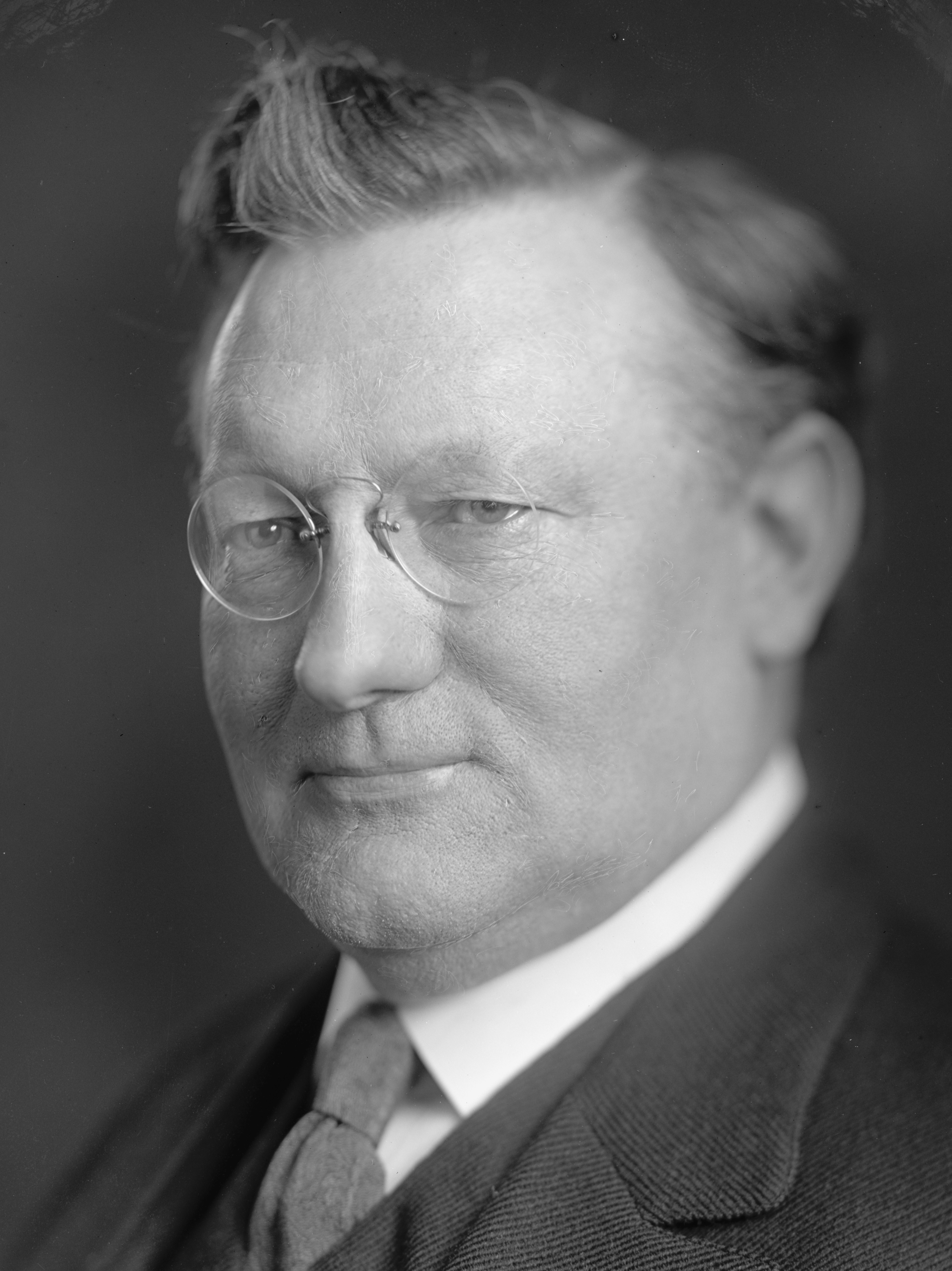

Nominee	James E. Watson	Albert Stump
Party	Republican	Democratic
Popular vote	522,837	511,454
Percentage	50.04%	48.95%
- County results Watson: 40–50% 50–60% 60–70% 70–80% Stump: 40–50% 50–60% 60–70%
U.S. senator before election
James E. Watson
Republican
Elected U.S. Senator
James E. Watson
Republican

The 1926 United States Senate election in Indiana took place on November 2, 1926. Incumbent Republican Senator James E. Watson was re-elected to a second full term in office over Democratic attorney Albert Stump.

== Democratic nomination ==
=== Candidates ===
- William A. Cullop, former U.S. Representative from Vincennes
- L. William Curry, opponent of Prohibition
- John E. Frederick, Kokomo businessman
- George W. Rauch, former U.S. Representative from Marion
- L. Ert Slack, former U.S. Attorney
- Albert Stump, World War I veteran and Indianapolis attorney

Frederick ran with the backing of former U.S. Senator and party boss Thomas Taggart. Curry ran primarily for the modification of the state's "bone dry" prohibition law, rather than national prohibition.

=== Primary ===
In a non-binding primary, Cullop won with Stump finishing second.

=== Convention ===
On the first convention ballot, Frederick was first with Cullop second. On the second ballot, Stump passed Cullop for second place. On the third, there was a stampede to his candidacy as Frederick and Cullop supporters abandoned their candidates for Stump.

== General election ==
=== Candidates ===
- William H. Harris (Prohibition)
- Albert Stump, World War I veteran and attorney (Democratic)
- Forrest Wallace (Socialist)
- James E. Watson, incumbent Senator since 1916 (Republican)

=== Results ===
1926 United States Senate election in Indiana
Party	Candidate	Votes	%	±%
Republican	James E. Watson (incumbent)	522,837	50.04%	▼4.53
Democratic	Albert Stump	511,454	48.95%	▲7.80
Prohibition	William H. Harris	5,420	0.52%	▼0.55
Socialist	Forrest Wallace	5,106	0.49%	▼1.38
Total votes		1,044,817	100.00%	
Republican hold		Swing		

== See also ==
- 1926 United States Senate elections
