= 1920 United States Senate election in Indiana =

- November 2, 1920
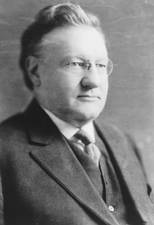

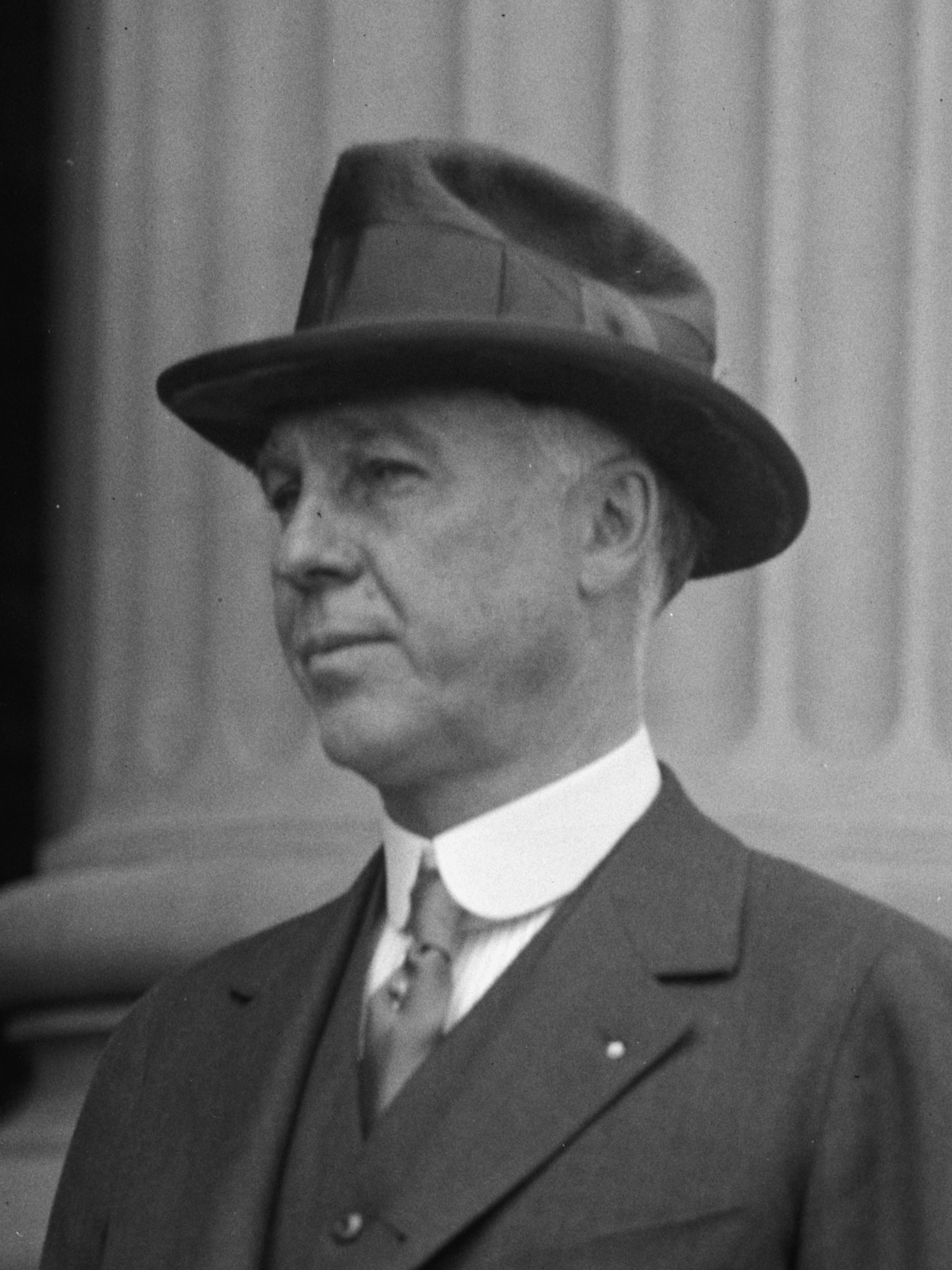
Nominee	James E. Watson	Thomas Taggart
Party	Republican	Democratic
Popular vote	681,851	514,191
Percentage	54.57%	41.15%
- County results Watson: 40–50% 50–60% 60–70% 70–80% Taggart: 40–50% 50–60% 60–70%
U.S. senator before election
James E. Watson
Republican
Elected U.S. Senator
James E. Watson
Republican

The 1920 United States Senate election in Indiana took place on November 2, 1920. Incumbent Republican Senator James E. Watson was re-elected to a full term in office over Thomas Taggart in a rematch of the 1916 special election for the same seat.

== General election ==
=== Candidates ===
- Culla Bayhinger (Prohibition)
- Francis J. Dillon (Farmer–Labor)
- Thomas Taggart, former U.S. Senator and mayor of Indianapolis (Democratic)
- Francis M. Wampler (Socialist)
- James E. Watson, incumbent Senator since 1916 (Republican)

=== Results ===
1920 United States Senate election in Indiana
Party	Candidate	Votes	%	±%
Republican	James E. Watson (incumbent)	681,851	54.57%	▲6.91
Democratic	Thomas Taggart	514,191	41.15%	▼5.14
Socialist	Francis M. Wampler	23,395	1.87%	▼1.21
Farmer–Labor	Francis J. Dillon	16,804	1.34%	N/A
Prohibition	Culla Bayhinger	13,323	1.07%	▼1.22
Total votes		1,249,564	100.00%	
Republican hold		Swing		

== See also ==
- 1920 United States Senate elections
