= Henry U. Johnson =

American politician and lawyer (1850–1939)

Henry Johnson
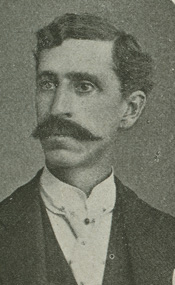
- Johnson in 1896

Member of the U.S. House of Representatives from Indiana's 6th district
- In office March 4, 1891 – March 3, 1899
- Preceded by: Thomas M. Browne
- Succeeded by: James E. Watson

Member of the Indiana Senate
- In office 1887–1889

Personal details
- Born: October 28, 1850 Cambridge City, Indiana, U.S.
- Died: June 4, 1939 (aged 88) Richmond, Indiana, U.S.
- Party: Democrat (1900 – 1939)
- Other political affiliations: Republican (before 1900)
- Education: Centerville Collegiate Institute; Earlham College

Henry Underwood Johnson (October 28, 1850 – June 4, 1939) was an American lawyer and politician who served four terms as a U.S. representative from Indiana from 1891 to 1899.

== Biography ==
Born in Cambridge City, Indiana, Johnson attended the Centerville Collegiate Institute and Earlham College, Richmond, Indiana. He studied law. He was admitted to the bar in 1872 and commenced practice in Centerville, Indiana.

He moved to Richmond, Indiana, in 1876 and continued the practice of his profession. He served as prosecuting attorney of Wayne County 1876–1880. He served as member of the Indiana State Senate 1887–1889.

=== Congress ===
Johnson was elected as a Republican to the Fifty-second and to the three succeeding Congresses (March 4, 1891 – March 3, 1899). However, he was affiliated with the Democratic Party upon the expiration of his congressional career. Johnson was not a candidate for re-nomination in 1898.

He served as chairman of the Committee on Elections No. 2 (Fifty-fourth and Fifty-fifth Congresses).

In April 1898, Johnson was among the six representatives who voted against declaring war on Spain.

=== Later career and death ===
Johnson moved to St. Louis, Missouri, in 1899 and continued the practice of law until 1900 when he returned to Richmond, Indiana, to resume his former law practice.

Johnson died in Richmond, Indiana, June 4, 1939. He was interred in Earlham Cemetery.

U.S. House of Representatives
Preceded by Thomas M. Browne	Member of the U.S. House of Representatives from Indiana's 6th congressional district 1891–1899	Succeeded by James E. Watson
