= Kern Resolution =

1913 American resolution sponsored by John W. Kern

The Kern Resolution, sponsored by Sen. John W. Kern (D) of Indiana and adopted on May 27, 1913, called for an investigation into the then ongoing Paint Creek–Cabin Creek strike of 1912 in West Virginia.

The resolution would "seek to determine if a system of peonage existed in the strike zone, if immigration or postal laws were being violated, if strikers were being prosecuted contrary to Federal law, and if certain other conditions existed."
