= 1908 Indiana gubernatorial election =

- November 3, 1908
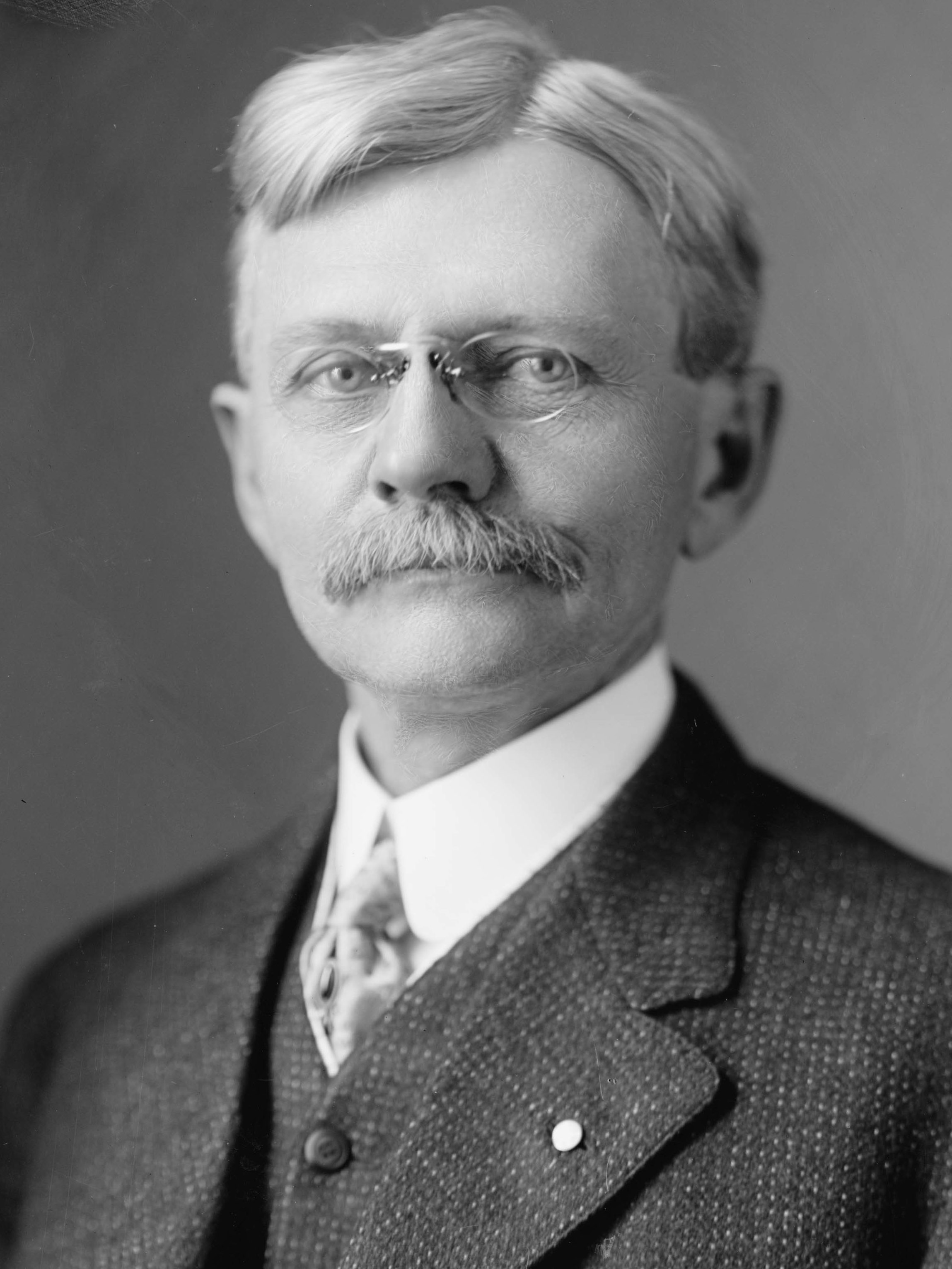

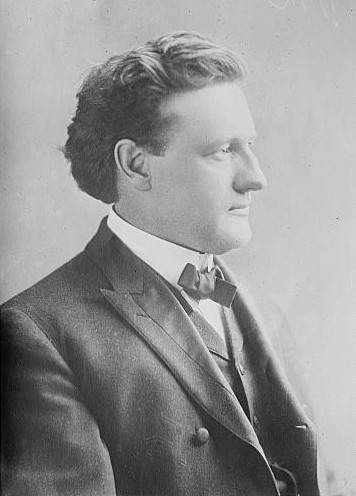
Nominee	Thomas R. Marshall	James Eli Watson
Party	Democratic	Republican
Popular vote	348,849	334,040
Percentage	48.95%	46.87%
- County results Marshall: 40–50% 50–60% 60–70% Watson: 40–50% 50–60% 60–70%
Governor before election
Frank Hanly
Republican
Elected Governor
Thomas R. Marshall
Democratic

The 1908 Indiana gubernatorial election was held on November 3, 1908. Democratic nominee Thomas R. Marshall narrowly defeated Republican nominee James Eli Watson with 48.95% of the vote.

== General election ==
=== Candidates ===
Major party candidates

- Thomas R. Marshall, Democratic, member of the Indiana Democratic Central Committee
- James Eli Watson, Republican, U.S. Representative from Indiana

Other candidates

- Sumner W. Haynes, Prohibition
- Frank S. Goodman, Socialist
- F.J.S. Robinson, People's
- O.P. Stoner, Socialist Labor
- James M. Zion, Independent

=== Results ===
1908 Indiana gubernatorial election
Party	Candidate	Votes	%	±%
Democratic	Thomas R. Marshall	348,849	48.95%	
Republican	James Eli Watson	334,040	46.87%	
Prohibition	Sumner W. Haynes	15,926	2.24%	
Socialist	Frank S. Goodman	11,948	1.68%	
Populist	F.J.S. Robinson	986	0.14%	
Socialist Labor	O.P. Stoner	573	0.08%	
Independence	James M. Zion	383	0.05%	
Majority		14,809		
Turnout				
Democratic gain from Republican		Swing		
