= 1904 Indiana gubernatorial election =

- November 8, 1904
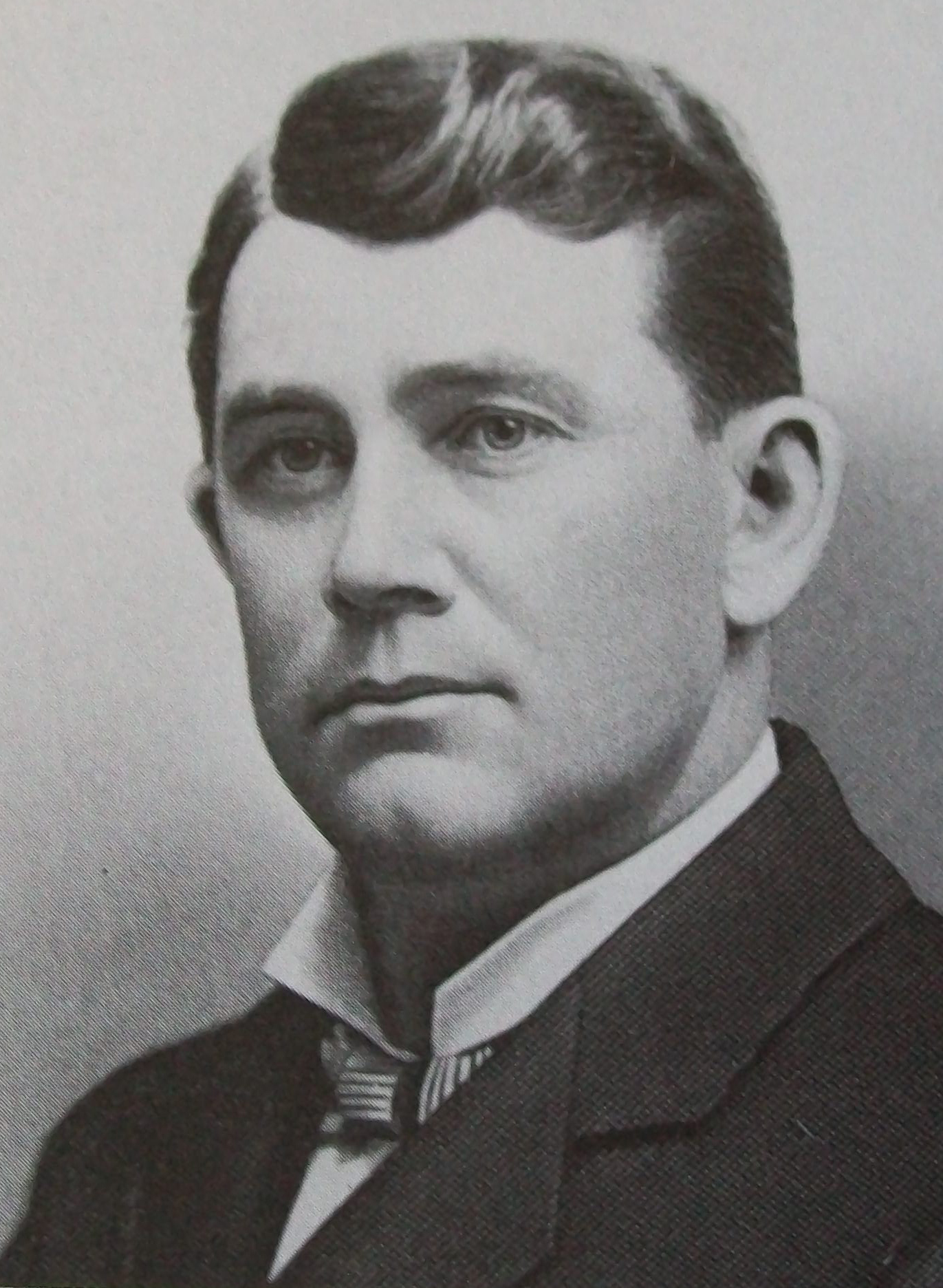

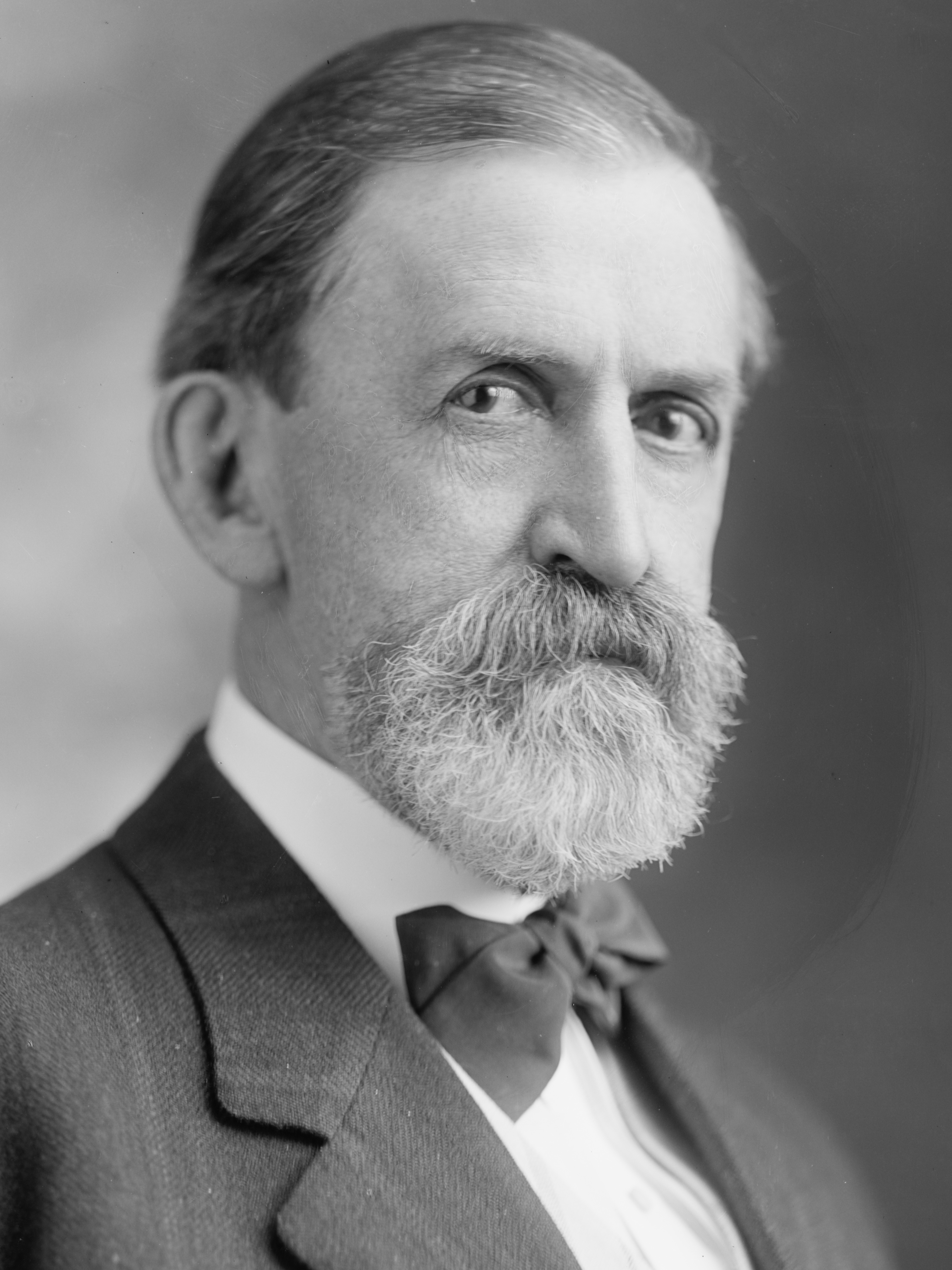
Nominee	Frank Hanly	John W. Kern
Party	Republican	Democratic
Popular vote	359,362	274,998
Percentage	53.51%	40.95%
- County results Hanly: 40–50% 50–60% 60–70% Kern: 40–50% 50–60% 60–70%
Governor before election
Winfield T. Durbin
Republican
Elected Governor
Frank Hanly
Republican

The 1904 Indiana gubernatorial election was held on November 8, 1904, in all 92 counties in the state of Indiana. Frank Hanly was elected governor over his Democratic opponent, John W. Kern.

== Nominations ==
Hanly, the former U.S. representative from Indiana's 9th congressional district, reentered politics in 1904 and won the Republican gubernatorial nomination. William L. Taylor, the former Indiana Attorney General from Indianapolis, also sought the Republican nomination, but was defeated. Democrats once again nominated John W. Kern, the former city solicitor of Indianapolis.

== Campaign ==
The election was hard-fought by Hanly, who delivered excoriating speeches against the Democratic party which he referred to as "unholy", and "great only its ability to destroy." He called their election campaign "selfish" and said they ran it only so they could "obtain the flesh pot of office."

== General election ==
1904 Indiana gubernatorial election
Party	Candidate	Votes	%
Republican	Frank Hanly	359,362	53.51
Democratic	John W. Kern	274,998	40.95
Prohibition	Felix T. McWhirter	22,690	3.38
Socialist	Matthew Hallenberger	10,991	1.64
Populist	Leroy Templeton	2,065	0.31
Socialist Labor	E. J. Dillon	1,437	0.21
Total votes		671,543	100.00

== Bibliography ==
- Gugin, Linda C.; St. Clair, James E, eds. (2006). The Governors of Indiana. Indianapolis: Indiana Historical Society Press.
- Storms, Daniel E. (1904). Biennial Report of Daniel E. Storms, Secretary of State of the State of Indiana [...]. Indianapolis.
