= 1916 United States Senate special election in Indiana =

- November 7, 1916
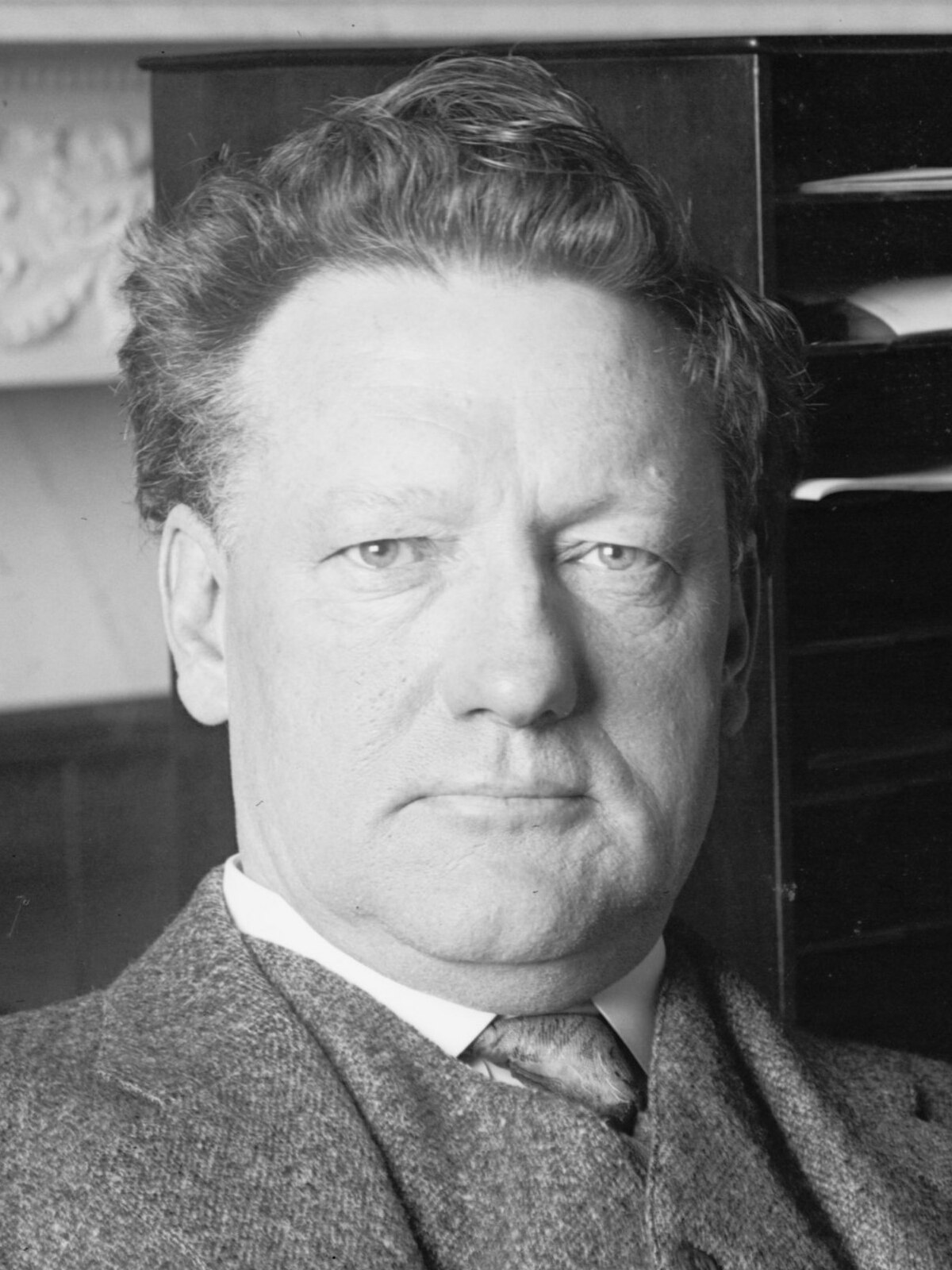

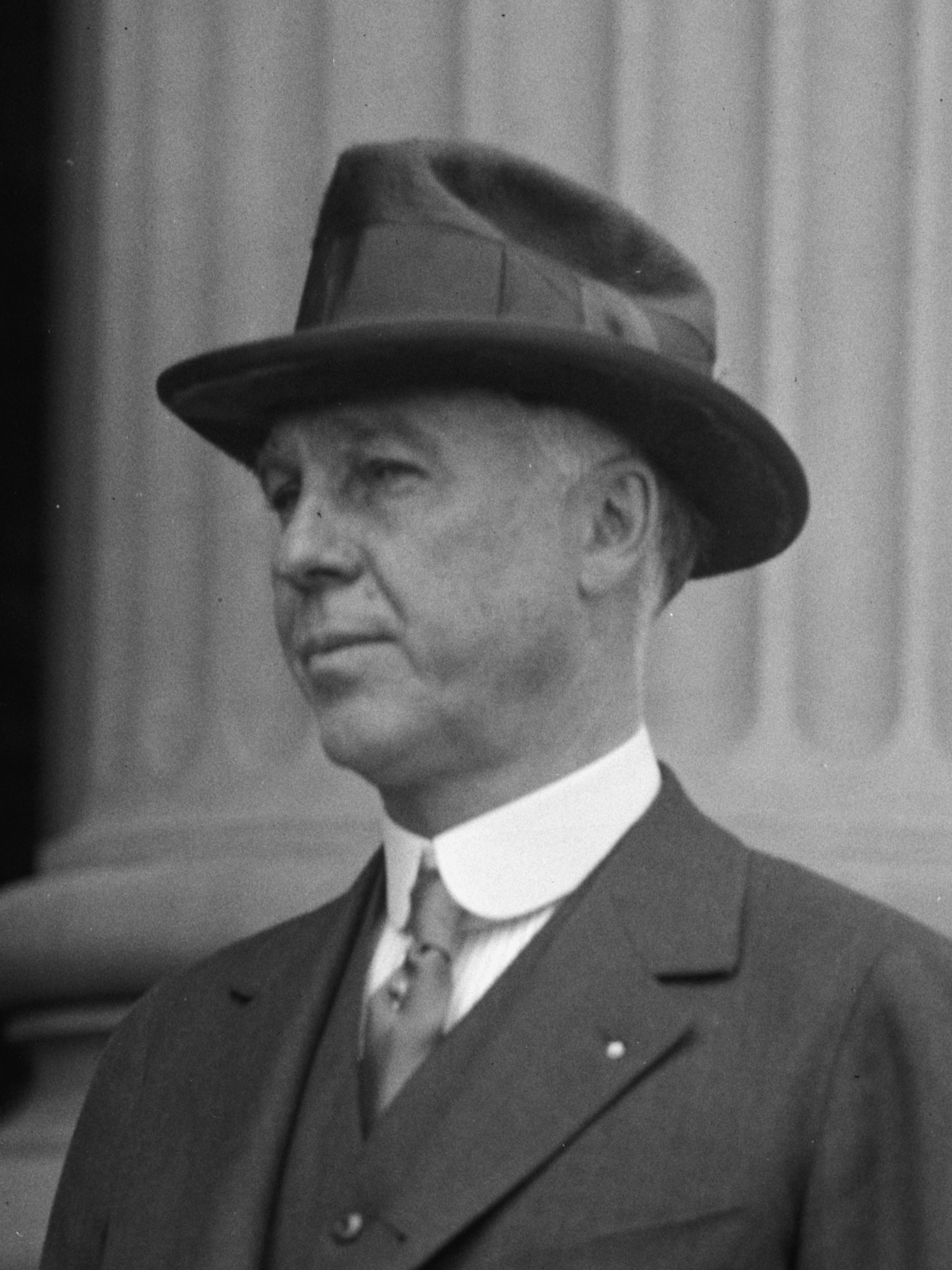
Nominee	James E. Watson	Thomas Taggart
Party	Republican	Democratic
Popular vote	335,193	325,577
Percentage	47.66%	46.29%
- County results Watson: 40–50% 50–60% 60–70% Taggart: 40–50% 50–60% 60–70%
U.S. senator before election
Thomas Taggart
Democratic
Elected U.S. Senator
James E. Watson
Republican

The 1916 United States Senate special election in Indiana took place on November 7, 1916, to complete the unexpired term of Benjamin F. Shively. Interim Democratic Senator Thomas Taggart was defeated in his bid to complete the term by U.S. Representative James Eli Watson.

== Background ==
Senator Benjamin F. Shively was re-elected in 1914 and served until his death on March 14, 1916. Governor Samuel Ralston appointed Thomas Taggart to fill the vacant seat on March 20 until a successor could be duly elected. The special election to complete the term was scheduled for November 7, 1916, concurrent with the general election for presidential electors and Indiana's other United States Senate seat.

== General election ==
=== Candidates ===
- John F. Clifford (Progressive)
- Edward Henry (Socialist)
- William H. Hickman (Prohibition)
- Thomas Taggart, interim U.S. Senator and former mayor of Indianapolis (Democratic)
- James E. Watson, former U.S. Representative from Rushville and nominee for Governor in 1908 (Republican)

=== Results ===
1916 U.S. Senate special election in Indiana
Party	Candidate	Votes	%	±%
Republican	James E. Watson	335,193	47.66%	▲12.56
Democratic	Thomas Taggart (incumbent)	325,577	46.29%	▲4.15
Socialist	Edward Henry	21,626	3.08%	▼0.28
Prohibition	William H. Hickman	16,095	2.29%	▲0.14
Progressive	Francis J. Dillon	16,804	0.68%	▼16.13
Total votes		703,289	100.00%	
Republican gain from Democratic		Swing		

== See also ==
- 1916 United States Senate elections
