= James E. Watson =

American politician (1864–1948)

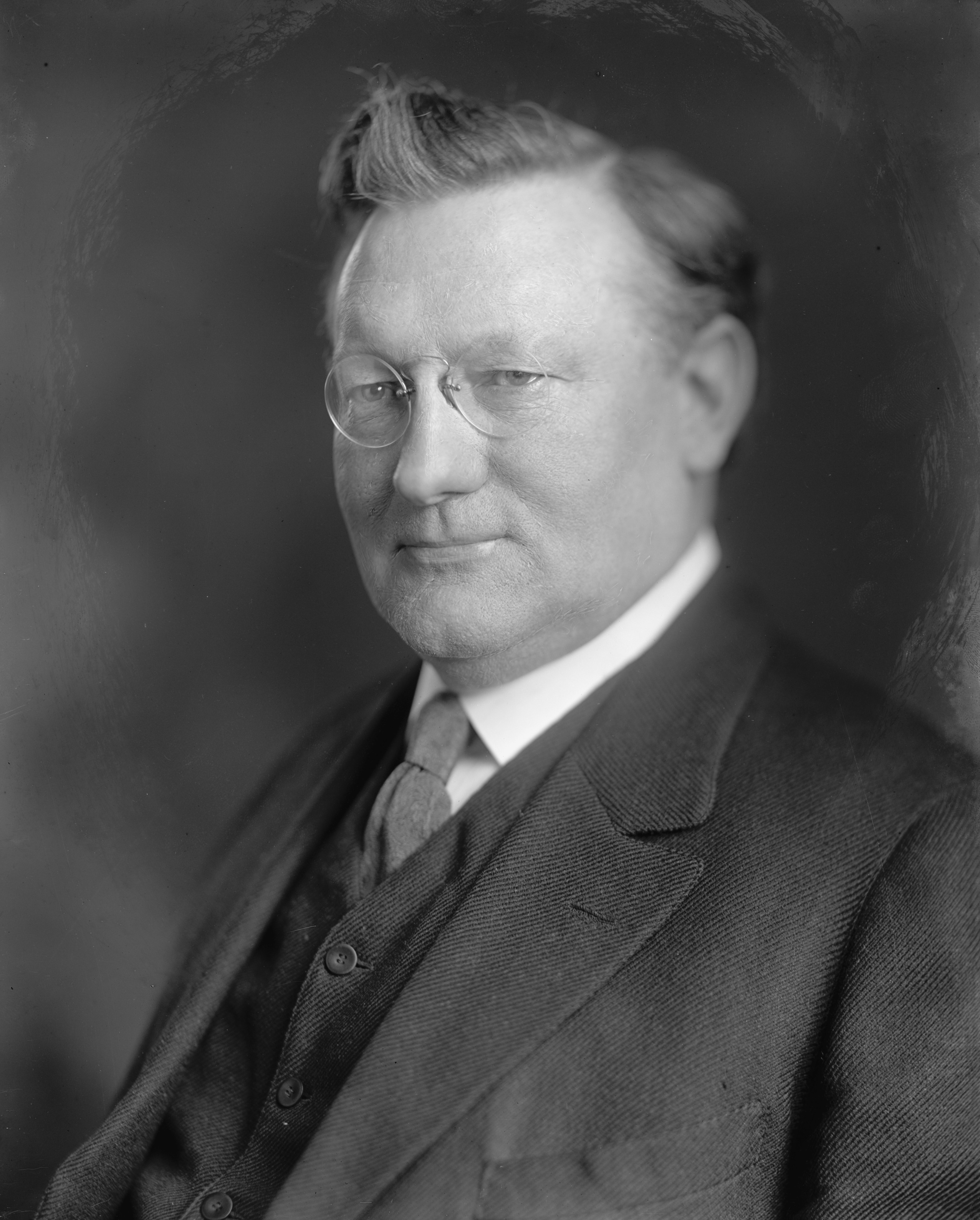
- Watson, 1905–1945

Senate Majority Leader
- In office March 4, 1929 – March 3, 1933
- Preceded by: Charles Curtis
- Succeeded by: Joseph Taylor Robinson

Leader of the Senate Republican Conference
- In office March 4, 1929 – March 3, 1933
- Deputy: Simeon Fess
- Preceded by: Charles Curtis
- Succeeded by: Charles L. McNary

United States Senator from Indiana
- In office November 8, 1916 – March 3, 1933
- Preceded by: Thomas Taggart
- Succeeded by: Frederick Van Nuys

Member of the U.S. House of Representatives from Indiana
- In office March 4, 1895 – March 3, 1897
- Preceded by: William S. Holman
- Succeeded by: William S. Holman
- Constituency: 4th district
- In office March 4, 1899 – March 3, 1909
- Preceded by: Henry U. Johnson
- Succeeded by: William O. Barnard
- Constituency: 6th district

Personal details
- Born: James Eli Watson; November 2, 1864 Winchester, Indiana, U.S.
- Died: July 29, 1948 (aged 83) Washington, D.C., U.S.
- Resting place: Cedar Hill Cemetery, Suitland, Maryland
- Party: Republican
- Education: DePauw University

James Eli Watson (November 2, 1864 – July 29, 1948) was a U.S. representative and U.S. senator from Indiana. He was the Senate's second official majority leader. While an article published by the Senate (see References) gives his year of birth as 1862, this is most probably incorrect.

== Early life ==
He was born in Winchester, Indiana, one of six children. His father was a lawyer, a Republican state legislator, and owner-editor of the local newspaper, the Winchester Herald. At the age of twelve, Watson accompanied his father to the 1876 Republican National Convention. Watson attended DePauw University in Greencastle, Indiana and graduated in 1886. At DePauw he was a member of Phi Kappa Psi fraternity. He then studied law, was admitted to the bar in 1886 and joined his father's law firm.

== Political career ==
Watson campaigned for Republican candidates throughout the 1880s and moved to Rushville, Indiana in 1893.

=== Congress ===
He was elected as U.S. Representative from Indiana's 4th congressional district in 1894 to the 54th Congress (1895–1897), defeating the incumbent Democratic William S. Holman, in part by speaking German, the language of many of his constituents.

He was defeated by Holman in 1896, but was elected from Indiana's 6th congressional district in 1898 to the 56th Congress and reelected to the 57th, 58th, 59th and 60th Congresses (1899–1909).

Shortly after his arrival in Washington, Watson became the "right-hand man" and protégé of Speaker Joe Cannon. Cannon ensured his selection as the Republican whip, trusted him with party strategy in the House of Representatives, and placed him on the powerful Ways and Means Committee. While Cannon had his share of adversaries in the House, Watson enjoyed the attention of a wide circle of friends. An enthusiastic storyteller and poker player, he attracted members from both parties. Colleagues would come to the House chamber just to hear him speak—not to be swayed by his conservative views, but to see him put on a good show. As one writer observed, Watson "would work himself up to an astonishing pitch, tear off his collar and necktie, then throw aside his coat and vest, until, clad in trousers, shirt, and suspenders, he could really let himself go."

=== Post-congressional career ===
Watson left the House to run for Governor of Indiana in 1908. Opposed by organized labor, he lost the election to Thomas R. Marshall, the future vice president under Woodrow Wilson. He resumed a private law practice in Rushville, though he continued to participate in Washington politics, supporting Cannon after House Democrats and Republican "insurgents" attempted to oust the speaker in 1909. The following year, Watson wrote Cannon's famous speech defending the leadership's authority, party government, and the rights of the majority. A pivotal moment in House history, the speech enabled Cannon to keep his position, but at a great reduction in power. The House adopted a resolution that prevented Cannon and subsequent speakers from serving on or appointing members to the all-important Rules Committee.

In the years after the House rebellion, Watson remained a prominent figure on Capitol Hill. Among other pursuits, he was a lobbyist for the American Manufacturers Association. While detractors, including members of the House, questioned the propriety of his new occupation, the criticism did not hurt his political standing in Indiana. In fact, he became known as an Indiana boss, and state politicians sought his endorsement as a necessary precursor to winning elections or appointments to higher office.

=== U.S. Senator ===
In 1916, Watson entered the U.S. Senate race against Democratic Senator John W. Kern, but his bitter primary battle against Harry S. New threatened to divide the state Republican party. Watson won the majority of primary delegates, but according to one source, New had "convincing affidavits of fraud" committed by Watson. As a result, Republican leaders could not decide which candidate to support. They were saved from making the decision when Indiana's other senator, Benjamin F. Shiveley, died in March. Both Republican candidates ran for Senate seats in the general election. New defeated Kern, and Watson won the remainder of Shively's term. He was reelected twice (1920 and 1926), serving from 1916 to 1933.

During his Senate tenure, he was

- majority leader 1929–1933
- chairman, Committee on Woman Suffrage (1919–21),
- chairman, Committee on Revision of the Laws (1919–21),
- chairman, Committee on Enrolled Bills (1923–25),
- chairman, Committee on Interstate Commerce (1925–1929),
- chairman, Republican Conference (1929–33)

In 1929, he was a defendant in a lawsuit wherein it was alleged by William M. Rogers, an avowed Klansman, that Watson had forced him to sign an affidavit recanting testimony before a Senate committee that Watson was also a member of the Ku Klux Klan.

The Democrats swept both Congress and the presidency in the election of 1932, and Watson lost his Senate seat in a landslide defeat.

=== Return of private sector ===
Following the election, however, Watson remained a fixture of the Washington scene, practicing law and trading stories with his former colleagues in the Republican cloakroom. He also retained, to a lesser degree, his power over Indiana politics. Wendell Willkie, a Republican convert and fellow Hoosier, could attest that Watson's support, or lack thereof, meant everything in the state. When Willkie ran for president in 1940, Watson would not endorse the former Democrat. Reportedly, he justified his refusal by saying, "I may welcome a repentant sinner into my church, but I wouldn't want him to lead the church choir."

Watson is credited with originating the saying If you can't lick 'em, jine 'em.

== Death and burial ==
Watson died in 1948 in Washington D.C. at the age of 83. Dr. Frederick Brown Harris, the former Senate chaplain, performed the funeral service in Washington. Until the end, Watson remained well liked, if not well respected, by House and Senate members. Perhaps only Hoover and Willkie bore a lasting grudge against him. Indeed, even his harshest critics considered Watson the man "impossible not to like". He is interred in Cedar Hill Cemetery, Suitland, Maryland.

U.S. House of Representatives
Preceded by William S. Holman	Member of the U.S. House of Representatives from Indiana's 4th congressional district 1895–1897	Succeeded by William S. Holman
Preceded by Henry U. Johnson	Member of the U.S. House of Representatives from Indiana's 6th congressional district 1899–1909	Succeeded by William O. Barnard
U.S. Senate
Preceded by Thomas Taggart	U.S. senator (Class 3) from Indiana; November 8, 1916 – March 4, 1933; Served alongside: Harry Stewart New, Samuel M. Ralston, Arthur Raymond Robinson	Succeeded by Frederick Van Nuys
Party political offices
Preceded by James Albertus Tawney	House Republican Whip; 1905–1909	Succeeded by John Wilbur Dwight
Preceded by Frank Hanly	Republican nominee for Governor of Indiana; 1908	Succeeded by Winfield T. Durbin
Preceded by Hugh T. Miller	Republican nominee for U.S. Senator from Indiana (Class 3); 1916, 1920, 1926, 1932	Succeeded by Raymond E. Willis
Preceded by Charles Curtis; Kansas	Senate Republican Leader; 1929–1933	Succeeded by Charles L. McNary; Oregon
