= John W. Kern =

American politician (1849–1917)

- Kern, c. 1905–1917

Chairman of the Senate Democratic Caucus
- In office March 4, 1913 – March 3, 1917
- Deputy: J. Hamilton Lewis
- Preceded by: Thomas S. Martin
- Succeeded by: Thomas S. Martin

United States Senator from Indiana
- In office March 4, 1911 – March 3, 1917
- Preceded by: Albert J. Beveridge
- Succeeded by: Harry New

Member of the Indiana Senate from Marion County
- In office 1893–1897 Serving with Romeo F. Stuart, James McHugh
- Preceded by: Henry C. Thompson, Henry T. Hudson
- Succeeded by: Martin M. Hugg, Harry New

Personal details
- Born: December 20, 1849 Alto, Indiana, U.S.
- Died: August 17, 1917 (aged 67) Asheville, North Carolina, U.S.
- Party: Democratic
- Education: University of Michigan, Ann Arbor (LLB)

John Worth Kern (December 20, 1849 – August 17, 1917) was an American attorney and politician who served as a Democratic United States senator from Indiana. While the title was not official, he is considered to be the first Senate majority leader (and in turn, the first Senate Democratic Leader), while serving concurrently as chairman of the Senate Democratic Caucus. He was also the Democratic vice presidential nominee in the 1908 presidential election.

Born in Alto, Indiana, Kern practiced law in Kokomo, Indiana, after graduating from the University of Michigan Law School. He won election to the Indiana Senate before serving as the city solicitor of Indianapolis. After running unsuccessfully for the position of Governor of Indiana, Kern was selected as the vice presidential nominee at the 1908 Democratic National Convention. The Democratic ticket of William Jennings Bryan and Kern was defeated by the Republican ticket of William Howard Taft and James S. Sherman.

Kern won election to the United States Senate in 1910, becoming a progressive ally of President Woodrow Wilson. He was elected Chairman of the Senate Democratic Caucus and helped pass several major pieces of legislation, including the Clayton Antitrust Act, the Revenue Act of 1913, and the Federal Reserve Act. He also introduced the Kern Resolution, which led to the investigation of conditions in coal mines, and supported passage of the Seventeenth Amendment. He was defeated for re-election in 1916, losing to Republican Harry Stewart New, and died the following year.

== Early life ==
Born in Alto, Indiana, Kern was the eldest of eight boys. He studied at the University of Michigan Law School, and began the practice of law in Kokomo, Indiana.

== Early career ==
He served as Kokomo's city attorney from 1871 to 1884. Kern was elected to the Indiana Senate in 1893, serving for four years, serving at the same time as assistant U.S. Attorney for Indiana. In that body, he established a reputation as a "pro-union progressive defender of the poor." He helped pass legislation to protect employees who attempted to form a union, an employer liability law, and a child labor law.

In 1895 he went to Europe to rest from his health problems. When in London, he met Alton B. Parker, with whom he established a lasting friendship. In 1896, he initially was not a fan of the idea of free silver, but when the Democrats adopted it in their 1896 party platform, he stuck with the platform. He also met the Democratic nominee for president that year, William Jennings Bryan, and they became close friends as well.

From 1897 to 1901 he was city solicitor of Indianapolis. He was the unsuccessful Democratic candidate for Governor of Indiana in 1900 and 1904. In 1904, he was asked to run by Parker, who by that time was on his way to becoming the Democratic nominee for president that year, to run for governor to try and boost the party in Indiana. However, it did not work, with both Parker and Kern losing the state in a landslide. After these defeats, he returned to his law practice, traveled to Europe, and spent six months at a sanatorium in Asheville, North Carolina, for reasons of health.

In the 1908 election, he was the Democratic candidate for Vice President, the running mate to Bryan on his third try to the presidency. His friendship with Bryan, as well as the fact that he was from the electorally important region of the Midwest, helped secure his place on the ticket, even over his objection. Thomas R. Marshall was the one who nominated Kern for the second spot on the ticket. In the end, the Bryan/Kern ticket was defeated by William Howard Taft. Kern then sought election to the United States Senate from Indiana (the legislature then being Democratic-controlled), but was outmaneuvered by fellow Democrat Benjamin F. Shively.

== United States Senate ==
Indiana's other Senate seat came up for election in 1910, and this time, the legislature elected Kern. He entered the Senate in 1911, one of ten new Democrats, most of them progressives. Joining Shively, Kern became a progressive Democrat and an opponent of monopolistic corporate power. He quickly became involved in an effort to shake up his party's conservative leadership. In 1912, he helped write the Democratic platform, which had progressive planks in favor of banking and tariff reform and direct popular election of senators.

In the election of 1912, Woodrow Wilson was elected president, Democrats gained a majority in the House, and eleven more progressive Democrats entered the Senate. Kern's national stature as a progressive, his skill at conciliation, and his personal popularity resulted in his unanimous election as Chairman of the Democratic Caucus and de facto majority leader. He worked closely with Wilson and often met with him privately. He kept the peace and promoted unity that helped propel Wilson's initiatives through the Senate. They included tariff reform, the nation's first income tax (as permitted by the Sixteenth Amendment), the Federal Reserve Act, antitrust laws, and the Federal Trade Commission.

In 1913, Kern was contacted by the labor activist Mary Harris Jones ("Mother Jones"), who had been imprisoned by a military court in West Virginia during the Paint Creek–Cabin Creek strike of 1912. In response, Kern introduced the Kern Resolution, adopted by the Senate on May 27. The resolution led to the Senate Committee on Education and Labor investigation into conditions in West Virginia coal mines. Congress almost immediately authorized two similar investigations: into conditions in copper mining in Michigan and coal mining in Colorado.

Kern advocated direct popular election of senators and helped enact the Seventeenth Amendment to establish it in 1913. However, when Kern sought re-election in 1916 under the new system, he was defeated by the Republican Harry S. New and narrowly lost the popular vote (47.8% to 46.1%).

== Retirement and death ==
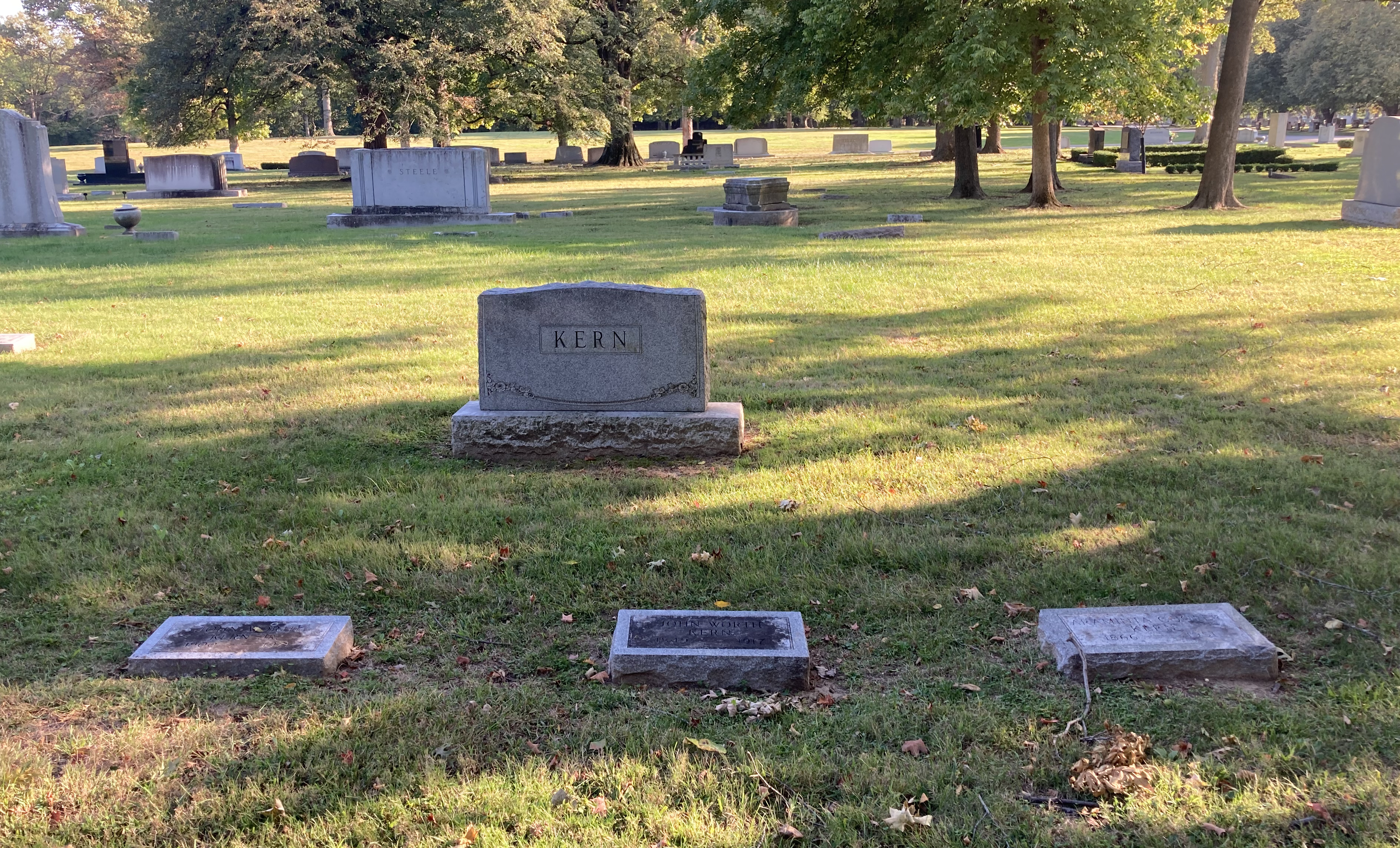
Kern's grave at Crown Hill Cemetery

At Bryan's urging, Wilson considered Kern for appointment to various offices, but Kern was in poor health and unable to serve. He died on August 17, 1917, in Asheville, five months after leaving the Senate. He was originally interred at his summer home near Hollins, Virginia, and re-interred in Crown Hill Cemetery in Indianapolis twelve years later. He was survived by his wife Araminta C. Kern, who died at age 85 in 1951, and his son John W. Kern Jr., a future judge and mayor of Indianapolis.

Party political offices
Preceded by Benjamin F. Shively	Democratic nominee for Governor of Indiana; 1900, 1904	Succeeded by Thomas R. Marshall
Preceded by Henry G. Davis	Democratic nominee for Vice President of the United States; 1908	Succeeded by Thomas R. Marshall
Preceded by Thomas S. Martin	Chair of the Senate Democratic Caucus; 1913–1917	Succeeded by Thomas S. Martin
First	Democratic nominee for U.S. Senator from Indiana (Class 1); 1916	Succeeded by Samuel M. Ralston
U.S. Senate
Preceded by Albert J. Beveridge	U.S. Senator (Class 1) from Indiana; 1911–1917; Served alongside: Benjamin F. Shively, Thomas Taggart, James Eli Watson	Succeeded by Harry New
Preceded by William P. Dillingham	Chair of the Senate Elections Committee; 1913–1917	Succeeded by Atlee Pomerene
