= Thomas Taggart =

American politician (1856–1929)

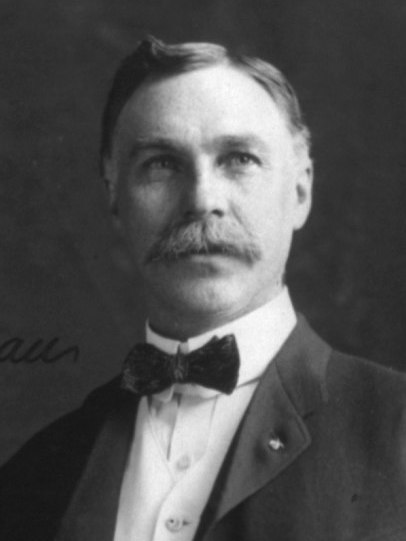

United States Senator from Indiana
- In office March 20, 1916 – November 7, 1916
- Appointed by: Samuel M. Ralston
- Preceded by: Benjamin F. Shively
- Succeeded by: James Eli Watson

Chair of the Democratic National Committee
- In office 1904–1908
- Preceded by: James Kimbrough Jones
- Succeeded by: Norman E. Mack

18th Mayor of Indianapolis
- In office January 1, 1895 – December 31, 1901
- Preceded by: Caleb S. Denny
- Succeeded by: Charles A. Bookwalter

Personal details
- Born: November 17, 1856 Emyvale, County Monaghan, Ireland
- Died: March 6, 1929 (aged 72) Indianapolis, Indiana, U.S.
- Resting place: Crown Hill Cemetery and Arboretum, Section 30, Lot 3; 39.8198807°N 86.176615°W
- Party: Democratic
- Spouse: Eva Bryant Taggart
- Children: Florence (1878–1899), Lucy (1880–1960), Nora (b. 1881), Irene (b. 1883), Emily (b. 1888), and Thomas D. (b. 1886)
- Occupation: Politician, hotelier, and financier

Thomas Taggart (November 17, 1856 – March 6, 1929) was an Irish-American politician who was the political boss of the Democratic Party in Indiana for the first quarter of the twentieth century and remained an influential political figure in local, state, and national politics until his death. Taggart was elected auditor of Marion County, Indiana (1886–1894), and mayor of Indianapolis (1895 to 1901). His mayoral administration supported public improvements, most notably the formation of the city's park and boulevard system. He also served as a member of the Democratic National Committee (1900–1916) and as its chairman (1904–1908). Taggart was appointed to the U.S. Senate in March 1916, but lost the seat in the November election.

Taggart, an Irish-born immigrant, came to the United States in 1861 at the age of five, grew up in Xenia, Ohio, and moved to Indiana as a teenager. After relocating to Indianapolis in 1877, he began a successful career as an hotelier, financier, and politician. As the party's county chairman during Grover Cleveland's 1888 presidential campaign, Taggart helped him carry Marion County over Republican Benjamin Harrison, the hometown candidate. As state chairman in 1892, Taggart helped Cleveland carry Indiana in opposition to Harrison's bid for reelection. In 1908 Taggart assisted in securing the Democratic nomination of John W. Kern for U.S. vice president and Thomas R. Marshall for governor of Indiana. He was also involved in securing the nomination of Woodrow Wilson for U.S. president and Marshall for vice president in 1912, as well as James M. Cox's nomination in the 1920 presidential election. In addition to his political activities, Taggart was the owner and developer of the French Lick Springs Hotel in Orange County, Indiana; he also maintained a summer home at Hyannis Port, Massachusetts.

== Early life and family ==
Thomas Taggart was born on November 17, 1856, to Thomas and Martha Kingsbury Taggart in Emyvale, County Monaghan, Ireland, and immigrated with his family to the United States in 1861 at the age of five. The Taggarts settled in Xenia, Ohio, where Thomas senior worked at a local railroad depot. Young Taggart left high school early to work full-time at the depot's hotel and restaurant. In 1875, when young Thomas was 18, his employer, the N. and G. Ohmer Company, sent him to Garrett, Indiana, to work in the restaurant at DeKalb House, a depot hotel. Thomas remained at Garrett until 1877, when he was transferred to Indianapolis, Indiana, to work as a clerk for the Ohmer company's dining hall/restaurant at the city's Union Depot. Known as a hard worker, Taggart became the depot restaurant's manager and eventually its sole owner in the new Union Station.

In 1878, a year after his move to Indianapolis, Taggart married Eva Dora Bryant, whom he met while living in Garrett. Thomas and his wife were the parents of six children, five daughters and one son. Florence Eva (1878–1899) died in a yachting accident in the Gulf of Mexico; Lucy Martha (1880–1960) became an accomplished artist and art educator at the John Herron Art Institute in Indianapolis; Nora (born 1881), a Vassar College graduate, married David L. Chambers, who became president and chairman of the Bobbs-Merrill Company; Irene Mary (born 1883) married a physician from Louisville, Kentucky; Emily Letitia (born 1888) married William R. Sinclair, an executive with Kingan and Company, an Indianapolis-based meatpacker; and Thomas Douglas (born 1886) graduated from Yale University and in 1912 assumed management of the French Lick Springs Hotel. Thomas and Eva Taggart also had nine grandchildren.

The Taggart family's primary residence was in Indianapolis, where they built a new home at 1331 North Delaware Street in 1913. The large home included a Georgian Colonial exterior and an Italian-style interior. It was selected as one of House Beautiful's three best homes in Indianapolis in 1920. The Taggarts were members of Saint Paul Episcopal Church in Indianapolis.

In 1901, after Taggart and a group of investors purchased the French Lick Springs Hotel in Orange County, Indiana, the Taggart family frequently visited the hotel. Its seven-story deluxe wing, completed in 1915, provided accommodations for the family when they were in residence.

The family also had a summer home built in 1915–16 at Hyannis Port, Massachusetts. The home was called Amyvale, in honor of Taggart's Irish birthplace. In 1928 Joseph P. and Rose Kennedy acquired property adjacent to the Taggarts' Hyannis Port home to establish the Kennedy compound. The Taggarts' Hyannis Port home was sold after Eva's death, in 1937.

== Career ==
After his move to Indianapolis in 1877, Taggart began a successful career as an Indiana hotelier, financier, and politician. Taggart became the owner of the restaurant at the Indianapolis Union Station, but sold his restaurant business and began other ventures that included acquisition of two hotels in Indianapolis and the French Lick Springs Hotel in Orange County, Indiana, among other investments. Taggart also became a "powerful Democratic boss of the state," often referred to by his initials, T. T., or called "the Easy Boss" because of his congenial nature.

Taggart was elected auditor of Marion County, Indiana (1886–1894), and mayor of Indianapolis (1895–1901). As the Democratic Party's boss in Indiana, a member of Democratic National Committee (1900–1916), and the party's national chairman (1904–1908), Taggart also became an influential political figure in state and national politics. In 1916 Taggart was appointed U.S. Senator, but he was defeated later that year in a special election.

=== Hotelier ===
After Taggart sold his restaurant business at the Indianapolis Union Station, his investments expanded to include controlling interests in the Grand and Denison hotels in Indianapolis and investments in the copper, gas, and oil industries.

In 1901 Taggart began his most ambitious and famous project when he organized a small group of investors that acquired and developed the French Lick Springs Hotel in Orange County, Indiana. In addition to Taggart, the group included William McDoel, president of the Monon Railroad; Crawford Fairbanks, a Terre Haute brewery owner; and Colonel Livingston T. Dickson, owner of "quarry and mineral interests in Indiana and Illinois."

Around 1905 Taggart bought his partners' interests in the mineral springs hotel to become its sole owner. Under Taggart's direction, the property was transformed into a first-class spa and a renowned gambling resort. Taggart made improvements and additions to the hotel, its mineral springs, and the resort's grounds. He also modernized the facilities, established trolley service to French Lick, and convinced the Monon Railroad to lay a spur track to the hotel's grounds and run daily passenger service to Chicago. At the height of the resort's popularity in the early decades of the 20th century, the hotel provided more than $2 million in annual profits.

Although casino gambling was illegal under Indiana law, it flourished in the Orange County area from the early 1900s until the mid-1940s, during the time the Taggart family managed the French Lick Springs Hotel, and contributed to the resort's popularity. Several casinos were in operation within Orange County, but Taggart disassociated himself with any connection to these local gambling establishments and denied any involvement in illegal gambling operations.

=== Politician ===
Taggart, who was a Democrat, became active in local politics in Indianapolis in the 1880s. He was elected auditor of heavily Republican Marion County in 1886, reelected in 1890, and served in that capacity until 1894. During that time Taggart also served as the Democratic Party chairman at the city, county, and state levels. As the county chairman during the presidential campaign of 1888, his efforts helped Grover Cleveland carry Marion County over native son Benjamin Harrison, the first time the county had voted Democratic in a Presidential election. As state chairman in 1892, Taggart helped Cleveland carry Indiana to challenge Harrison's bid for reelection.

From 1895 to 1901, Taggart served three two-year terms as the mayor of Indianapolis. He defeated Republican Preston C. Trusler in 1895, William M. Harding in 1897 and Charles A. Bookwalter in 1899. During his mayoralty, Taggart's administration emphasized efficient use of the city's funds and civic improvements that included acquisition of more than 900 acres (360 hectares) along the White River to establish the city's park and boulevard system. Although the city's then-growing African American population generally supported Republicans until the New Deal, Indianapolis lawyers Alexander E. Manning (who became president of the National League of Negro Democrats in 1896) and James T.V. Hill were Taggart's liaisons with their community, which helped elect and re-elect Taggart.

Taggart remained active in national and state politics until his death in 1929. He served on the Democratic National Committee from 1900 to 1916 and as its chairman from 1904 to 1908. As the party's national chairman, Taggart ran Judge Alton B. Parker's campaign in the presidential election in 1904, but Parker lost to Theodore Roosevelt. Taggart played a key role in securing John W. Kern's Democratic nomination for U.S. vice president and Thomas R. Marshall's nomination for governor of Indiana in 1908, as well as Woodrow Wilson's nomination for U.S. president and Marshall's vice presidential nomination in 1912 at the Democratic National Convention in Baltimore, Maryland.

On March 20, 1916, Indiana governor Samuel M. Ralston appointed Taggart, his political ally, to the U.S. Senate to fill a seat left vacant by the death of Benjamin F. Shively. Taggart advocated efficient use of federal funds and opposed wasteful spending, although his time in the Senate was brief. That November proved a Republican sweep and Taggart lost the Senate seat to James E. Watson. In 1920 Taggart helped James M. Cox win the Democratic nomination in the presidential election. Cox reciprocated by supporting Taggart's challenge to regain the Senate seat from Watson, but again Republicans swept in the November general election: Warren G. Harding defeated Cox and Taggart lost to Watson.

In 1924 Taggart had nearly secured Samuel Ralston's nomination as the Democratic candidate in the presidential election before Ralston withdrew from the race for health reasons. In Indiana's gubernatorial campaign that year, Taggart endorsed Carleton B. McCulloch, but McCulloch lost the election to Edward L. Jackson, who enjoyed strong Ku Klux Klan support and carried all but two of Indiana's 92 counties.

== Later years ==
Taggart's health declined in the 1920s, but he remained active in national and state politics and civil affairs until his death in Indianapolis in 1929. He served as chairman of the board of directors of American Fletcher National Bank (1925–1929); as a director of the Indianapolis, Light, Heat, and Power Company; and treasurer of the Indiana Lincoln Union. He was also a member of the George Rogers Clark Memorial Commission.

== Death and legacy ==
Taggart died on March 6, 1929. After a brief funeral service in the dining room of his North Delaware Street home in Indianapolis, he was buried at Crown Hill Cemetery. His gravesite is near those of his wife, Eva, and four of their children (Florence, Lucy, Irene, and Thomas). The Taggart family burial plot is in Section Three of the cemetery and marked with a tall, gray obelisk. Following his death in 1929, Taggart's son, Thomas Douglas, became owner of the French Lick Springs Hotel property and buildings valued at nearly $2 million.

Taggart is considered the "undisputed boss of the Democratic machine for the first quarter of the twentieth century" and "one of Indiana’s most dominant political figures." He is also remembered for his support of public improvements as mayor of Indianapolis, most notably the formation of city's public park and boulevard system. Taggart's efforts in this area made him "a leader in the movement to conserve urban natural resources for public use."

== See also ==
- List of United States senators born outside the United States

== Notes ==
Party political offices
Preceded by Benjamin F. Shively	Democratic nominee for U.S. Senator from Indiana (Class 3); 1916, 1920	Succeeded by Albert Stump
Political offices
Preceded by Caleb S. Denny	Mayor of Indianapolis; 1895–1901	Succeeded by Charles A. Bookwalter
U.S. Senate
Preceded by Benjamin F. Shively	United States Senator (Class 3) from Indiana; 1916	Succeeded by James Eli Watson
