= John Brett Richeson House =

Historic house in Kentucky, United States

Coordinates: 38.65081559718021°N 83.77229515975898°W

- U.S. National Register of Historic Places
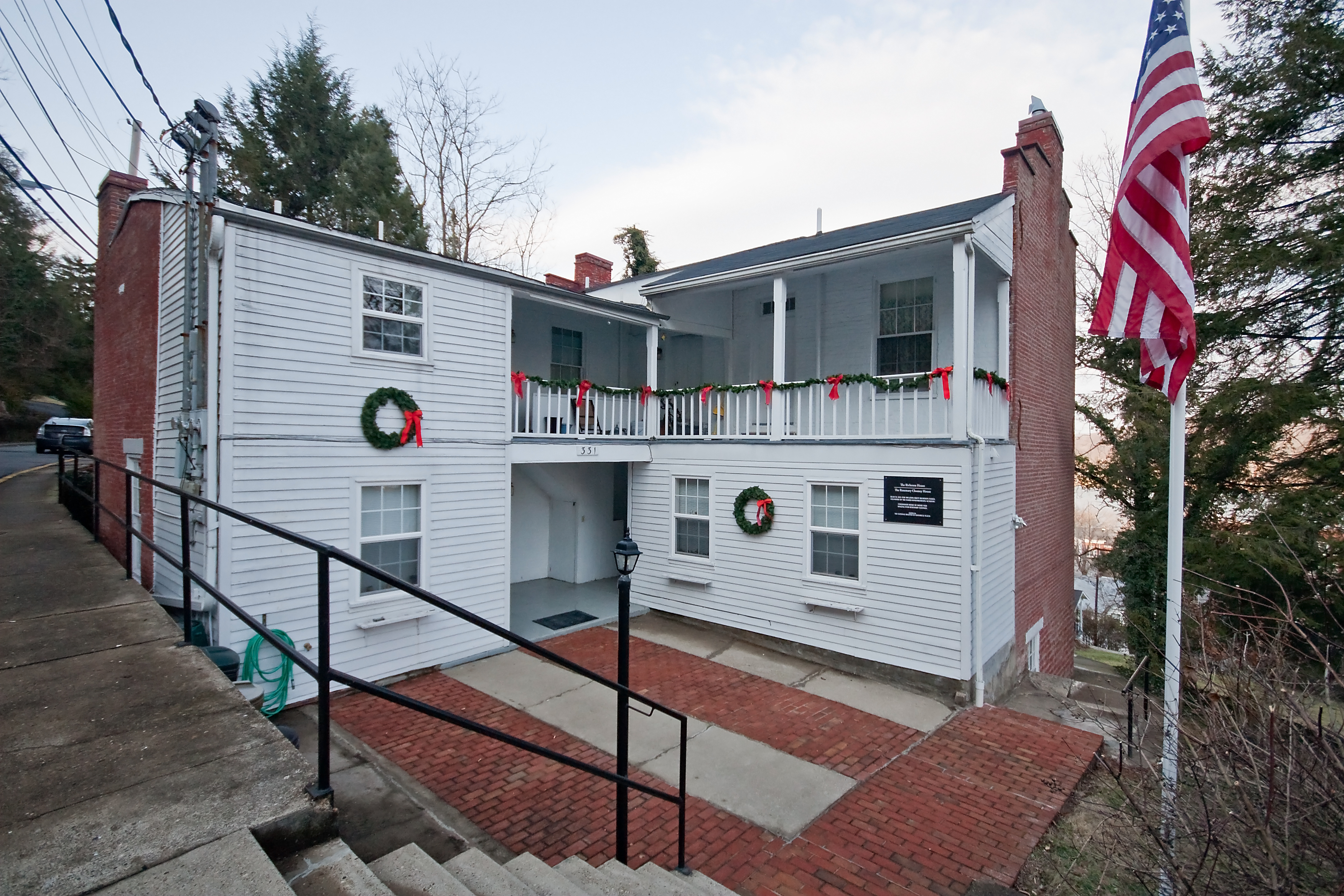

- Location within Kentucky Location within the United States
- Location: 331 West Third Street, Maysville, Kentucky
- Built: 1831; 195 years ago
- Architectural style: Greek Revival
- NRHP reference No.: 94000733
- Added to NRHP: July 22, 1994

The John Brett Richeson House in Maysville, Kentucky, was built in 1832 and purchased by John Richeson, an educator from Charlottesville, Virginia, for his wife Mildred Richeson and their eight children. The house was occupied by the Richeson family for more than 100 years until the death of Edward Richeson in 1941.

The Richeson family provided Maysville with some of the most accomplished and brilliant teachers ever known in Kentucky, and they helped to establish Maysville as a leading educational community during the period 1832–1880. Several of John Richeson's children were teachers, including sons William and John Richeson, and his daughter Ann Frances Richeson Peers. Several grandchildren were also teachers.

== Maysville Academy ==
Upon his arrival in Maysville in 1832, John Brett Richeson, in partnership with professor Jacob Rand, founded and operated Maysville Academy for several decades. The academy was the first successful secondary school in Maysville and specialized in preparing young men for university level studies. It attracted a number of students who later attained prominence including:

- Ulysses Grant, Civil War General and two-term U.S. President
- William "Bull" Nelson, Civil War General
- Walter Newman Haldeman, Editor and founder of the Louisville Courier
- John J. Crittenden, accomplished jurist and politician
- Thomas H. Nelson, U.S. Minister to Mexico
- Henry Stanton, Confederate soldier and Poet Laureate
- Ormond Beatty, educator and President of Centre College

== Rosemary Clooney ==
Singer and actress Rosemary Clooney was born in Maysville and lived in the Richeson House in the late 1940s. The city named a nearby street in her honor when her first movie, The Stars Are Singing, premiered at the Russell Theatre.
