= Frankel & Curtis =

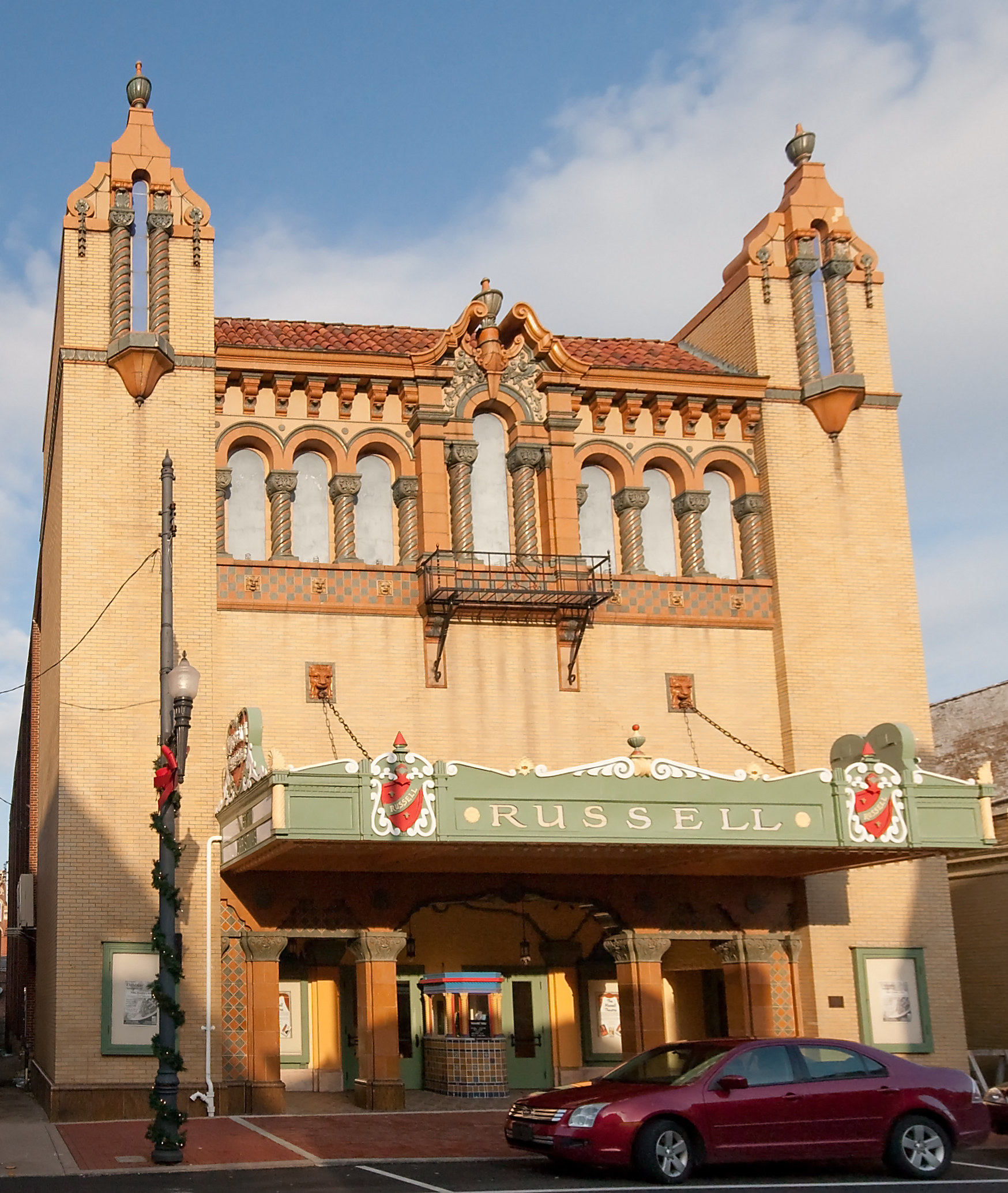
Russell Theatre

Frankel & Curtis was an architectural firm of Lexington, Kentucky. It was a partnership of Leon K. Frankel and of John J. Curtis, along with associates James Slaughter Frankel and Melbourne Mills. A successor name is Frankel, Curtis & Coleman. Under this name, the firm received a 1963 American Institute of Architects Kentucky award, its Honor Award merit prize, for its Admin. Bldg., of the Spindletop Research Center, in Lexington, Kentucky.

A number of their works are listed on the National Register of Historic Places.

Works include:

- Admin Building, Spindletop Research Center, Lexington, Kentucky
- Cadentown School, 705 Caden Ln., Lexington, Kentucky, NRHP-listed
- Charles W. Caldwell House, 0.2 mi N of KY 34, 0.6 mi W of KY 127, Danville, Kentucky, NRHP-listed
- Elizabethtown Armory, 205 Warfield St., Elizabethtown, Kentucky, NRHP-listed
- Fohs Hall, 143 N. Walker St., Marion, Kentucky, NRHP-listed
- Garth School, 501 S. Hamilton St., Georgetown, Kentucky, NRHP-listed
- Lexington Herald Building, 121 Walnut St., Lexington, Kentucky, NRHP-listed
- Lexington Laundry Company Building, 139 E. Main St., Lexington, Kentucky, NRHP-listed as a contributing resource in the Downtown Commercial District
- Russell Theatre, 9 E. Third St., Maysville, Kentucky, NRHP-listed
- Second Presbyterian Church, 460 E. Main St., Lexington, Kentucky, NRHP-listed
- Somerset Armory, 109 Grand Ave., Somerset, Kentucky, NRHP-listed
- Wolf Wile Department Store Building, 248–250 E. Main St., Lexington, Kentucky, NRHP-listed
