= John Haldeman =

American journalist and baseball player (1855–1899)

John Avery Haldeman
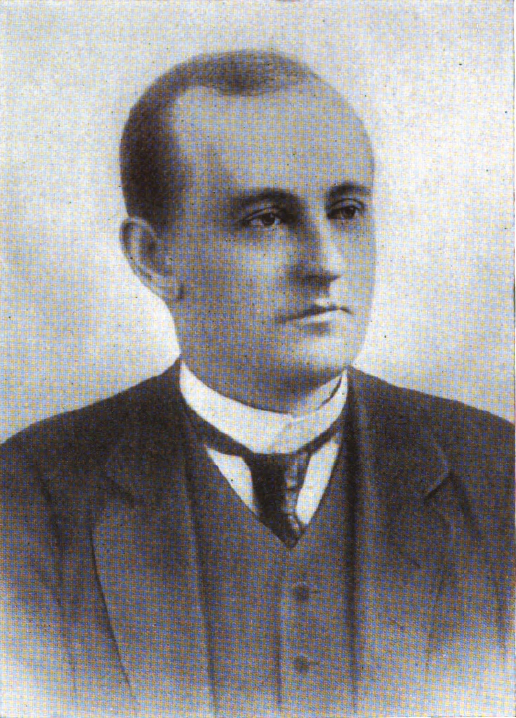
- Born: December 2, 1855; Pewee Valley, Kentucky, U.S.
- Died: September 17, 1899 (aged 43); Louisville, Kentucky, U.S.
- Resting place: Cave Hill Cemetery; Louisville, Kentucky, U.S.
- Education: Washington and Lee University
- Occupation: Newspaper journalist
- Spouse: Anna Buchanan (m. 1887)
- Children: 3
- Father: Walter Newman Haldeman

John Avery Haldeman (December 2, 1855–September 17, 1899) was a journalist who played one game for Major League Baseball's Louisville Grays in the 1877 season.

== Early life ==
Haldeman was born on December 2, 1855, in Pewee Valley, Kentucky. He was the son of Louisville Times (later Louisville Courier-Journal) owner and Louisville Grays president Walter Newman Haldeman. He attended Washington and Lee University and took an active part in athletics there. After graduation, he became the business manager for his father's newspaper. He also played first base for the Eagle Juniors, an amateur baseball team in Louisville.

== 1877 baseball season ==
On July 3, 1877, while Haldeman was reporting on the Louisville Grays baseball team, he made his only appearance in a Major League game. Louisville shortstop Bill Craver was unable to play in the game, and Grays manager Jack Chapman decided to move second baseman Joe Gerhardt to shortstop and ask Haldeman to play second base. Haldeman did not manage a hit in four at bats against Cincinnati Red Stockings pitcher Candy Cummings, but he did sacrifice teammate Orator Shafer to third base in the sixth inning; Shafer scored later in the inning. Haldeman also committed three errors in the field. The game marked the only time in baseball history that a reporter covering a team played in the game they were covering.

The Grays were having an excellent season until a seven-game losing streak in late August, prompting Haldeman to write a column in the Courier-Journal questioning the reason for the team's slide. The poor play continued on a road trip later in the season, causing the team to fall out of first place in the league and lose the pennant race. This prompted Haldeman to question the performance of players such as pitcher Jim Devlin, who he claimed had not used his best pitch during the entire road trip. He also openly questioned whether the team had deliberately thrown the pennant race. Haldeman's accusations eventually gained traction, and four players – Devlin, Craver, Al Nichols, and George Hall – were found to have thrown games.

== Later life and death ==
On September 7, 1887, Haldeman married Anna Buchanan, who was the great-great-granddaughter of Kentucky pioneer William Whitley. The couple had three daughters: Jean Bruce (Haldeman) Wendling, Bessie Avery Haldeman, and Isabel Brown Haldeman. Haldeman died in Louisville, Kentucky, on September 17, 1899, and was buried in Louisville's Cave Hill Cemetery.
