= Walter Newman Haldeman =

American newspaper publisher (1821–1902)

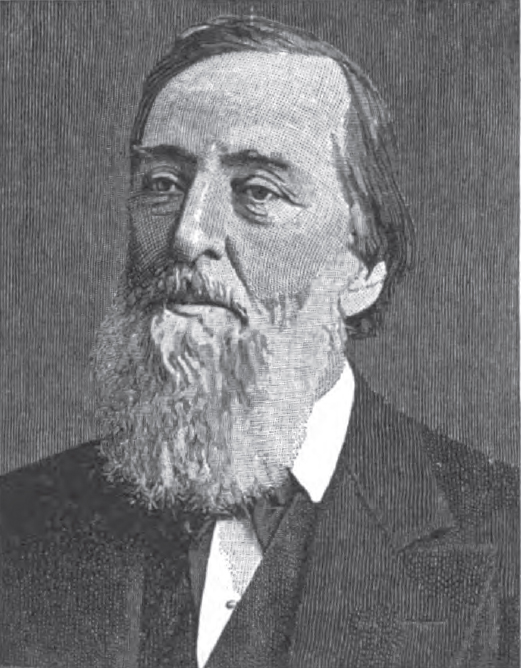
- Portrait of Walter Haldeman
- Born: April 27, 1821; Maysville, Kentucky, U.S.
- Died: May 14, 1902 (aged 81); Louisville, Kentucky, U.S.
- Occupations: Newspaper publisher; businessman
- Years active: 1842–1902
- Employer: Louisville Courier-Journal
- Spouse: Eliza Metcalfe (m. 1844)
- Children: 6, including John Haldeman

Walter Newman Haldeman (April 27, 1821 – May 14, 1902) was an American newspaper publisher, owner, and businessman from Louisville, Kentucky, in the 19th and early 20th centuries. He was the founder of the Louisville Courier, which would later merge to become Louisville Courier-Journal. He was the founder of the city of Naples, Florida, and the owner of the Major League Baseball team Louisville Grays.

== Early life ==
Walter Newman Haldeman was born on April 27, 1821, in Maysville, Kentucky, to Elizabeth and John Haldeman. He spent his childhood years in Maysville and attended Maysville Academy with future prominent Americans' Ulysses S. Grant, William H. Wadsworth, Thomas H. Nelson, and William "Bull" Nelson under the tutelage of Professor William A. Richardson. At age 16, Haldeman moved with his family to Louisville, Kentucky, where he worked in a grocery store called Rogers & Dunham and commission house. In 1840, Haldeman started his newspaper career in a clerical position at the Louisville Journal, but within a few years he had opened his own bookstore and print shop.

== Career ==
In 1843, Haldeman started the publication of a small newspaper called the Daily Dime. Haldeman renamed the newspaper in 1844 to the Louisville Courier. It was a pro-secessionist newspaper both before and during the Civil War. It was shut down by General Robert Anderson in September 1861, but Haldeman fearing arrest as a traitor, removed to Bowling Green, Kentucky, where he continued publication. After the war, in 1868, the Courier merged with its cross-town rival—the pro-Union Louisville Journal—to form the Louisville Courier-Journal. Haldeman became president of the new corporation. The combined paper is still in circulation and currently owned by the Gannett Company.

Haldeman is also known as the founder of Naples, Florida, and the owner of the Major League Baseball team, the Louisville Grays; a charter member of the National League. His son, John Haldeman, played in one game for the Grays in 1877.

Haldeman shied away from the spotlight, as a New York Times article from May 14, 1902, described him as "a man of unusual force of character, but remarkably modest, so that he resented any form of publicity about himself"; thus providing the spotlight for the Courier-Journal editor, Henry Watterson.

== Personal life ==
Haldeman married Eliza Metcalfe of Cincinnati, Ohio, in 1844. They had six children: Lizzie, Isabel, William, Bruce, John, and an unnamed child who died in infancy.

Haldeman died in Louisville on the morning of May 14, 1902, from peritonitis following an injury from being hit by a street car a week prior.
