= Fohs Hall =

- U.S. National Register of Historic Places
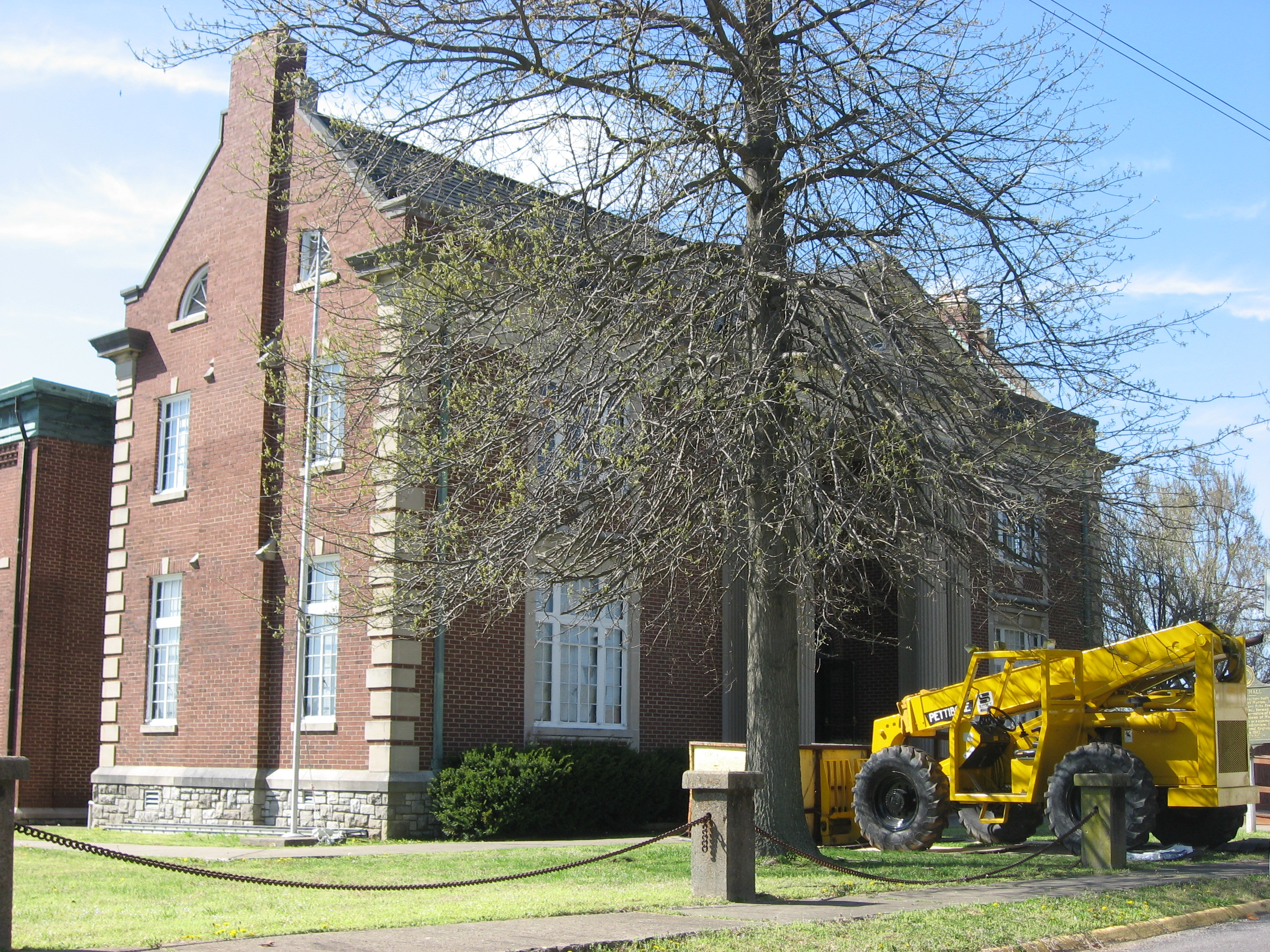

- Location within Kentucky Location within the United States
- Location: 143 N. Walker St., Marion, Kentucky
- Coordinates: 37.334167°N 88.078611°W
- Area: 1.1 acres (0.45 ha)
- Built: 1926
- Built by: J.N. Boston & Sons
- Architect: Frankel & Curtis
- Architectural style: Classical Revival
- NRHP reference No.: 82002682
- Added to NRHP: April 29, 1982

Fohs Hall in Marion, Kentucky was built in 1926. It was listed on the National Register of Historic Places in 1982.

It was built to serve as a community center for Marion and was a donation of Ferdinand Julius Fohs, a notable petroleum geologist who grew up in Marion. Architects Frankel and Curtis of Lexington, Kentucky, designed the building, which was built at a cost of $73,081 on the site of the small house where Fohs had lived. Fohs donated it to the Marion Board of Education to serve as a community center and as an auxiliary building for Marion High School, which was located across the street. The building included a music room, a lounge, a study hall, a small library, classrooms, and an auditorium.

It is a two-story brick building on a limestone foundation. It has a recessed center bay in its front, north-facing facade, topped by a stone pediment supported by four Corinthian columns.

Fohs formed a geological firm, Fohs and Gardner, with James H. Gardner as partner. Fohs is credited with helping discover the Mexia oil field in 1920.
