= Lexington Herald-Leader =

Newspaper based in Lexington, Kentucky

- The June 1, 2012 front page of the Lexington Herald-Leader
- Type: Daily newspaper (Wednesday, Friday, Sunday print distribution)
- Format: Broadsheet
- Owner: The McClatchy Company
- Editor: Richard Green
- Staff writers: 143
- Founded: 1870; 156 years ago (as the Lexington Daily Press)
- Headquarters: 100 Midland Avenue; Lexington, Kentucky 40508; US
- Circulation: 12,000 Digital Subscribers; 34,888 Daily; 68,545 Sunday (as of 2017)
- ISSN: 0745-4260
- Website: kentucky.com

The Lexington Herald-Leader is a newspaper owned by the McClatchy Company and based in Lexington, Kentucky. According to the 1999 Editor & Publisher International Yearbook, the paid circulation of the Herald-Leader is the second largest in the Commonwealth of Kentucky.

The newspaper has won the 1986 Pulitzer Prize for Investigative Reporting, the 1992 Pulitzer Prize for Editorial Writing, and the 2000 Pulitzer Prize for Editorial Cartooning. It had also been a finalist in six other Pulitzer awards in the 22-year period up until its sale in 2006, a record that was unsurpassed by any mid-sized newspaper in the United States during the same time frame.

== History ==
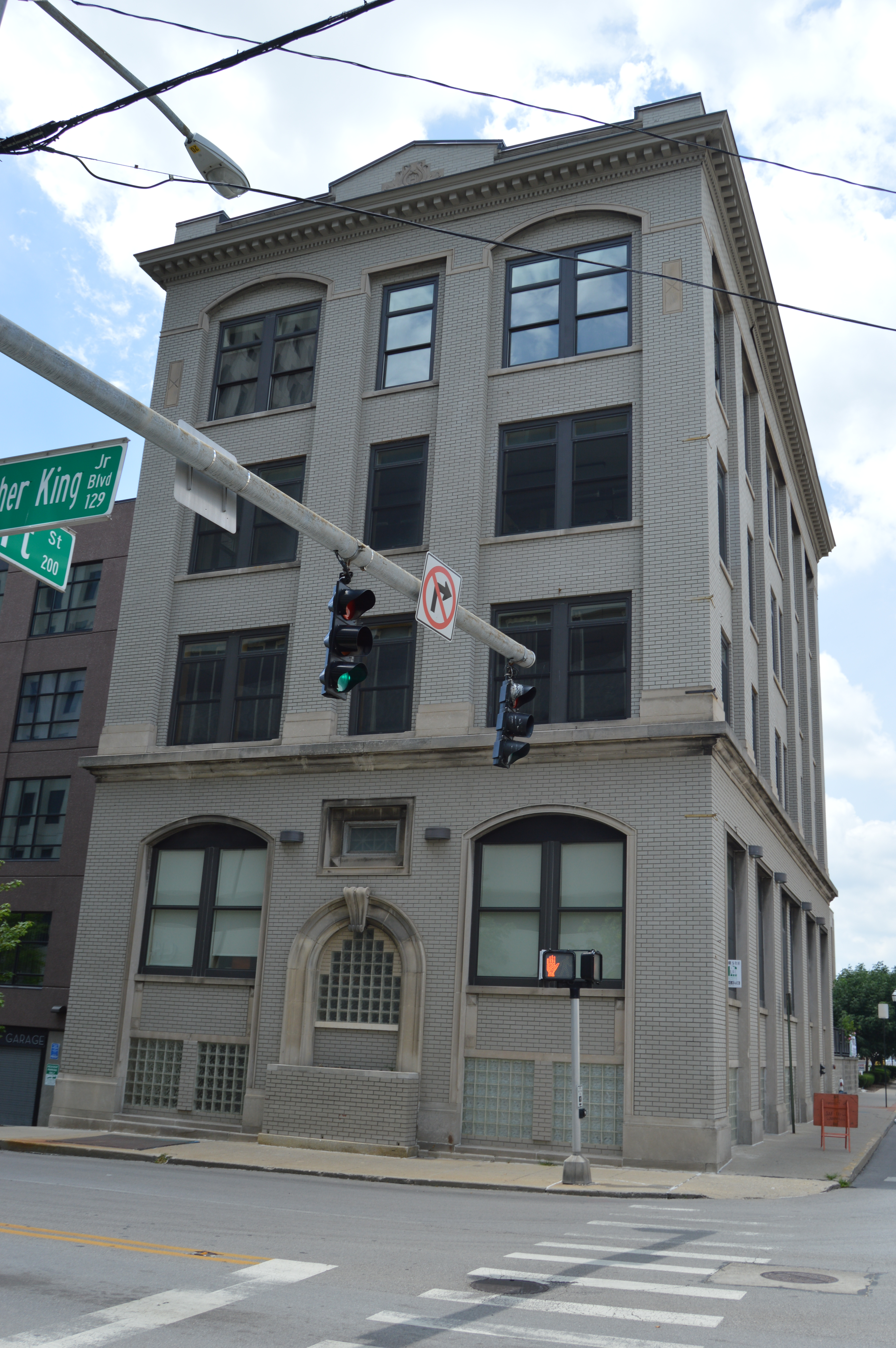
Former offices on Walnut Street

The Herald-Leader was created by a 1983 merger of the Lexington Herald and the Lexington Leader. The story of the Herald begins in 1870 with a paper known as the Lexington Daily Press. In 1895, a descendant of that paper was first published as the Morning Herald, later to be renamed the Lexington Herald in 1905. Meanwhile, in 1888 a group of Fayette County Republicans began publication of a competing afternoon paper named the Kentucky Leader, which became known as the Lexington Leader in 1901.

In 1937, the owner of the Leader, John Stoll, purchased the Herald. The papers continued as independent entities for 46 years. Despite the common ownership, the two papers had different editorial stances; the Herald was moderately liberal while the Leader was conservative. The two newspapers published a combined Sunday edition. In 1973, both were purchased by Knight Newspapers, which merged with Ridder Publications to form Knight Ridder the following year. A decade later, in 1983, the Herald and Leader merged to form today's Lexington Herald-Leader. In 1985, publisher Creed Black allowed reporters to publish a series of articles which exposed widespread corruption within the University of Kentucky's Wildcats men's basketball team. From 1979 to 1991, the paper was edited by John Carroll, who went on to edit The Baltimore Sun and the Los Angeles Times.

On July 11, 2001, the paper reduced four positions due to declining advertising revenue and higher newsprint costs. Long-time columnists Don Edwards and Dick Burdette took voluntary early retirements but are still published occasionally as contributing writers. The job eliminations were a cumulation of efforts that started in May when the workforce was reduced by 15 positions.

On July 4, 2004, the newspaper, in an effort to apologize for failing to cover the civil rights movement, published a front-page package of stories and archive photos documenting Lexingtonians involved in the movement. The stories, written by Linda B. Blackford and Linda Minch, received international attention, including a story on the front page of The New York Times. It also received an annual professional award by the Kentucky chapter of the Special Libraries Association.

On June 27, 2006, the McClatchy Company purchased Knight Ridder for approximately $4 billion in cash and stock. It also assumed Knight Ridder debt of $2 billion. McClatchy sold 12 Knight Ridder papers, but the Herald-Leader was one of 20 retained.

== Office and production plant ==
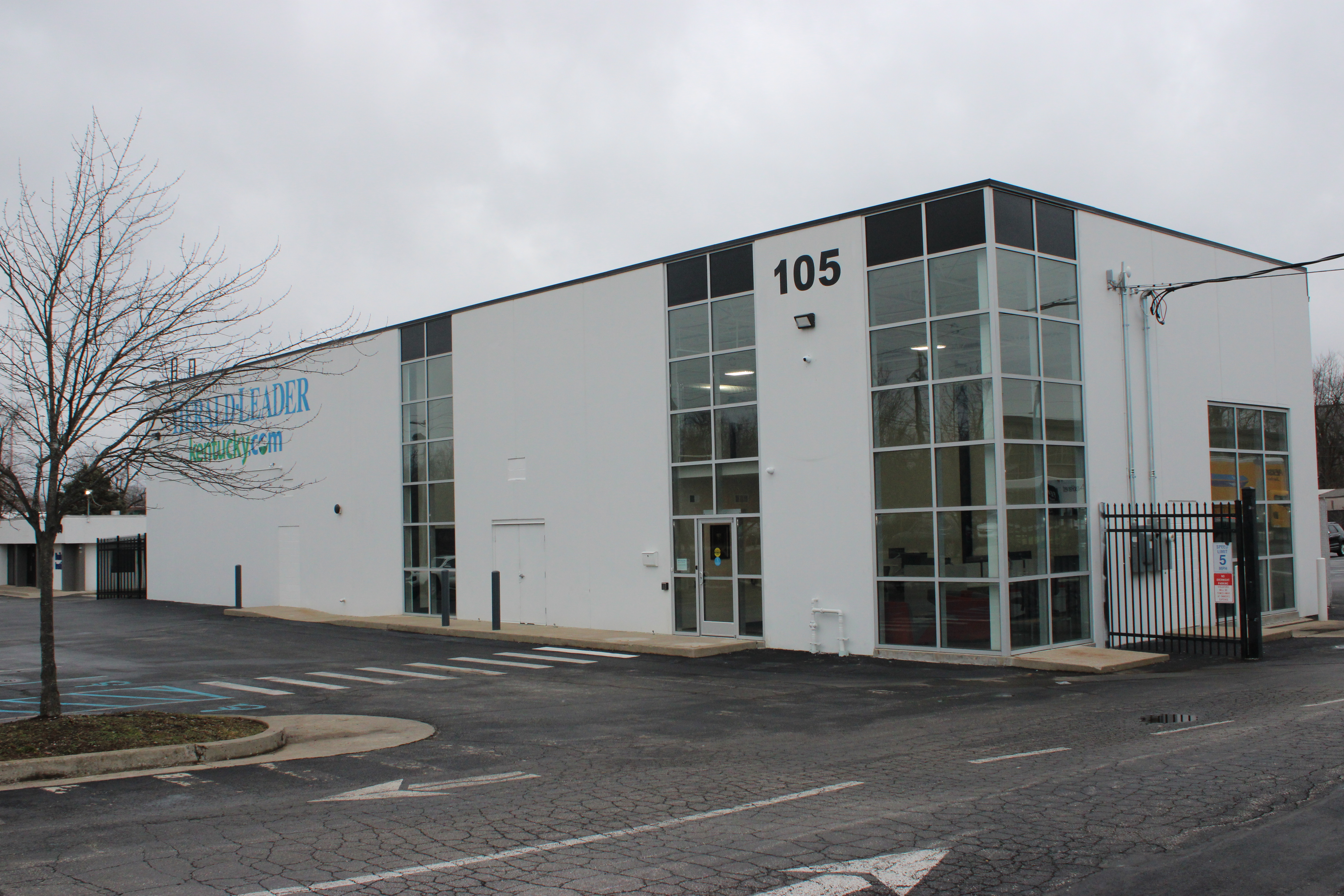
The office of the Lexington Herald-Leader on Loudon Avenue in Lexington, Kentucky.

The Herald-Leader's new office and production plant facility was completed in September 1980 at a cost of $23 million. It was a 158,990 square feet (14,771 m^{2}) structure that featured 14 Goss Metro offset presses that had the capacity to produce 600,000 newspapers in a typical week.

The plant is on a 6-acre (24,000 m^{2}) lot at the corner of East Main Street and Midland. The $23 million cost was divided into $7,804,000 for architecture, $750,000 for interiors and $8,500,000 for production equipment and presses.

In June 2016, it was announced that the Herald-Leader would cease its printing operations in Lexington, contracting them out to Gannett from the Louisville facilities for the Courier Journal. As a result of the move, 25 full-time and 4 part-time employees would be laid-off. It was also announced that the plant would be put up for sale, with the Fayette County property valuation administrator assessing the property at $6.84 million for tax purposes. The first issue of the Louisville-printed Herald-Leader published on August 1, 2016. The last issue of the Lexington Herald-Leader to be printed in Lexington was printed on July 31, 2016. It marked the end of 229 years of newspaper printing in Lexington. In turn, the Louisville facility was shut down in 2021 as part of Gannett's own consolidation of its printing facilities, and like the Courier Journal, the paper is now printed out-of-state in Tennessee from the Knoxville News Sentinel's facility, meaning that stories and sports scores occurring in the early evening are not within the print edition.

The Herald-Leader building has been proposed as a new city hall for the Lexington-Fayette Urban County Government. Remaining staff will be relocated to a smaller office space upon the sale of the building.

On August 5, 2024, the print edition was reduced to being printed on Wednesday, Friday and Sunday, with carrier delivery being discontinued for mail delivery exclusively.

== See also ==
- The Courier-Journal – Kentucky's largest newspaper
- Lexington Herald Building
- List of newspapers in Kentucky
