= Lexington Herald Building =

- U.S. National Register of Historic Places
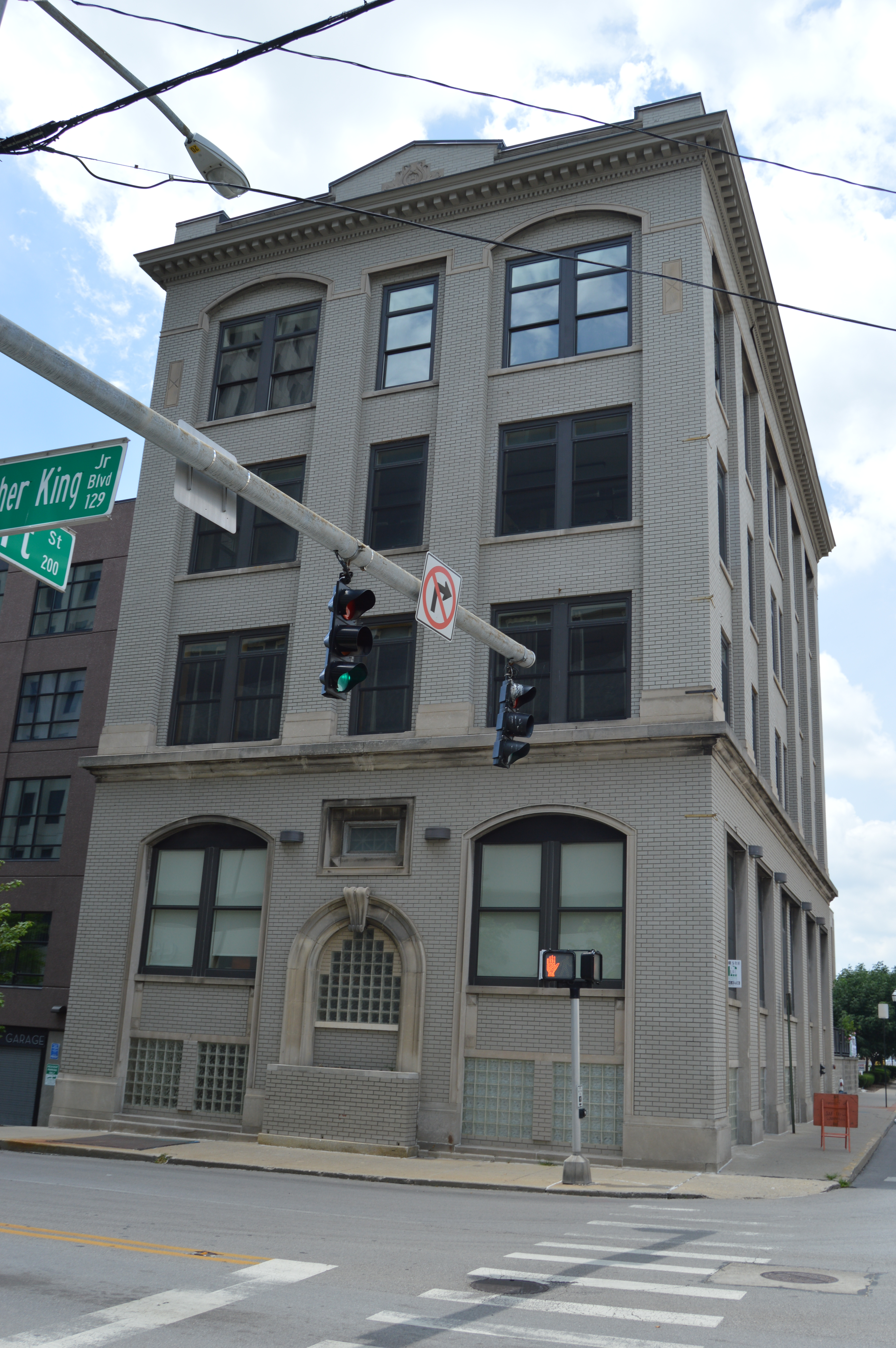

- Location within Kentucky Location within the United States
- Location: 121 Walnut St., Lexington, Kentucky
- Coordinates: 38°02′44″N 84°29′41″W
- Area: 0.1 acres (0.040 ha)
- Built: 1917
- Architect: Leon K. Frankel, F. Paul Anderson
- NRHP reference No.: 82001565
- Added to NRHP: October 29, 1982

The Lexington Herald Building, also known as the Nunn Building, in Lexington, Kentucky, is a 4-story commercial structure designed by Leon K. Frankel of Frankel & Curtis and constructed in 1917 as headquarters of the Lexington Herald. F. Paul Anderson, dean of the College of Engineering at University of Kentucky, where Frankel was also a professor, consulted on the steel frame of the brick building. The building's ornamentation is minimal, and it includes a denticulated cornice above the fourth floor windows and a parapet. There is a gable in the parapet in the front center holds a decorative scroll displaying an "H" (for Herald). The building was added to the National Register of Historic Places in 1982.

John L. Nunn purchased the Lexington Herald in the 1930s, and the Lexington Herald Building is now more associated with Nunn than with the Herald. The building functioned as office space for various clients until 2006, when it was renovated and expanded as a condominium development.

The building address had been 121 North Walnut Street, but Walnut was renamed Martin Luther King Boulevard, and the address is currently 121 N Martin Luther King Blvd.
