= Second Presbyterian Church (Lexington, Kentucky) =

- U.S. National Register of Historic Places
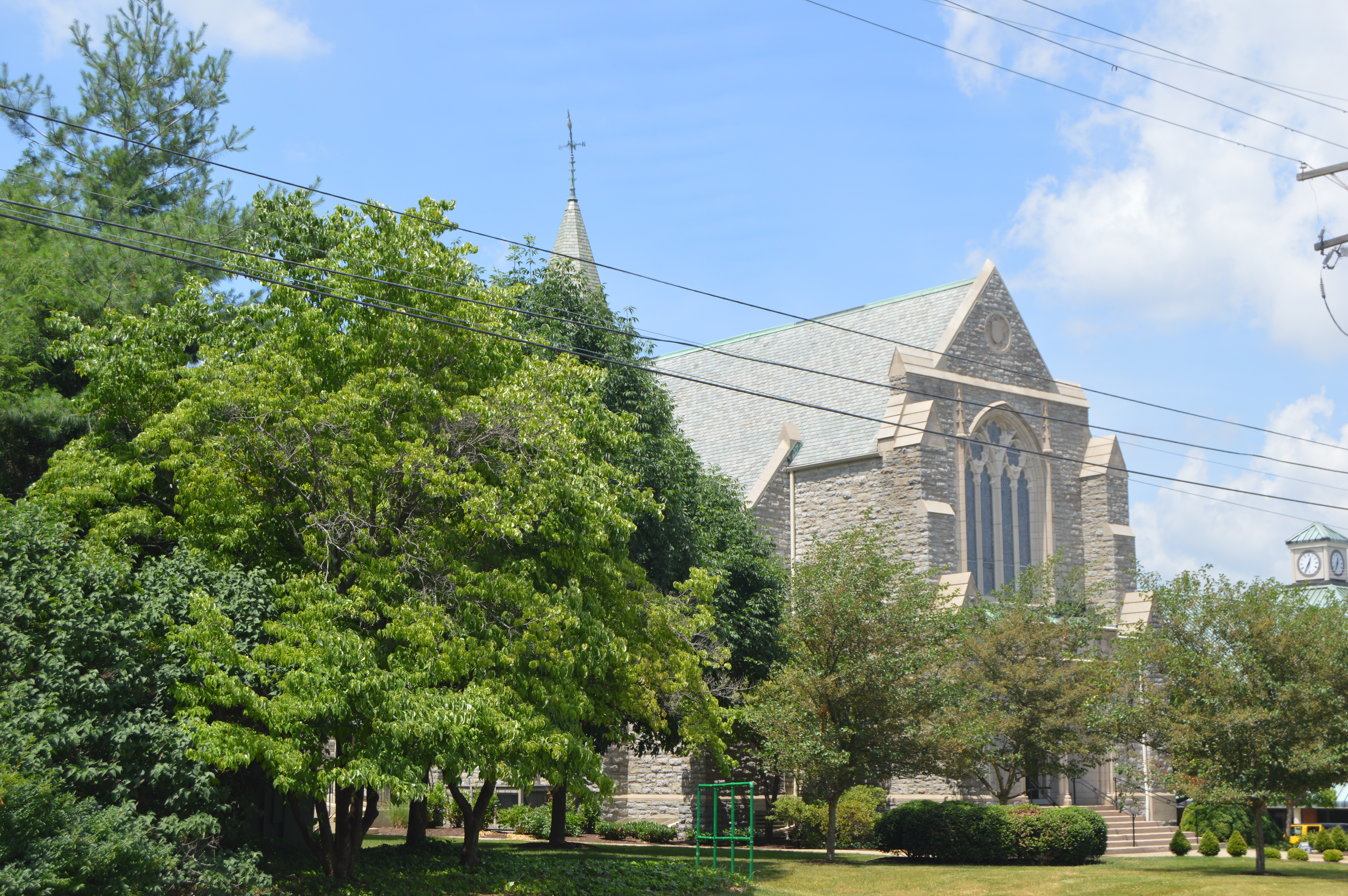
- Front of the church

- Location within Kentucky Location within the United States
- Location: 460 E. Main St., Lexington, Kentucky
- Coordinates: 38°2′23″N 84°29′26″W
- Area: 1.1 acres (0.45 ha)
- Built: 1922
- Architect: Cram & Ferguson; Frankel & Curtis
- Architectural style: Gothic Revival-
- NRHP reference No.: 80001522
- Added to NRHP: August 11, 1980

The Second Presbyterian Church is a historic Presbyterian church located at 460 E. Main Street in Lexington, Kentucky. Construction began on the church in 1922, and it was dedicated in 1924; it was the third building used by its congregation, which was founded in the 1810s. Architects Cram & Ferguson designed the Gothic Revival church; Frankel & Curtis are also associated with the building. The church's main entrance features multiple gabled buttresses, a balcony under a large arched window, and a gable at its peak. On the west side of the church, a buttressed tower rises from the roof to a steep spire.

The church was added to the National Register of Historic Places in 1980.
