= Russell Theatre =

Building in Maysville, Kentucky

- U.S. National Register of Historic Places
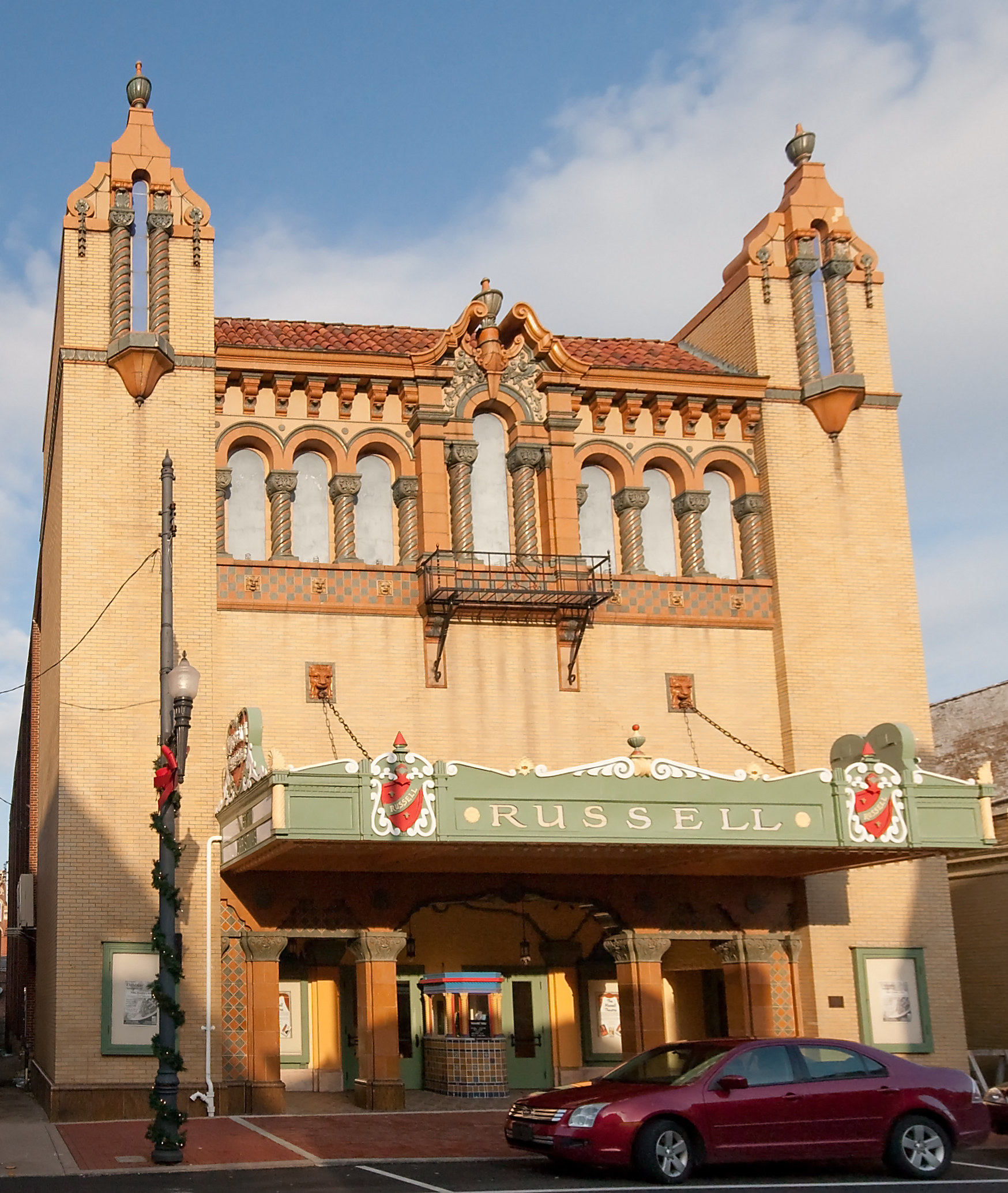

- Location within Kentucky Location within the United States
- Location: 9 E. Third St.
- Nearest city: Maysville, Ky
- Coordinates: 38°38′48″N 83°45′53″W
- Built: 1930
- Architect: Frankel and Curtis
- Architectural style: Spanish Colonial Revival, Moorish Revival
- NRHP reference No.: 06000216
- Added to NRHP: March 31, 2006

The Russell Theatre is a building in Maysville, Kentucky that was originally intended as a movie theater but has since been adapted for other uses. Construction of the Russell Theatre was announced by Maysville businessman Col. J. Russell Barbour in 1928. The structure costing $125,000 opened on December 4, 1930, with a showing of the movie Whoopee! starring Eddie Cantor. The building site was previously occupied by wholesale grocery warehouses.

== Architecture ==
The structure is a freestanding, three-story building with an 80 feet (24 m) by 165 feet (50 m) rectangular footprint with an area of about 13,000 square feet (1,200 m^{2}). The exterior features a Spanish-Moorish Revival style with a tower on either end of the principal facade. The box office is finished in Rookwood tile. Although constructed as a movie theater, the Russell did have dressing rooms for live performers and an orchestra pit. The auditorium was decorated as a Mediterranean garden complete with Lombardy poplar and literary busts set into wall niches. A rainbow would appear over the stage at the end of the movie.

== History ==
Col. Russell operated the theater until 1935 at which time operations were turned over to the Schine group. In 1953, the Russell theater presented the world premiere of Maysville native Rosemary Clooney's movie The Stars Are Singing. In the early 1970s, the Panther Group took over operations and repainted much of the jewel toned decoration with bright primary colors. The Panther Group continued to operate the theatre until 1983. In subsequent years, the building was used as a restaurant, a used furniture store, a used clothing store, and a newspaper utility building before its eventual close.

After its abandonment, strong storm winds ripped off a roof section and the damage was not immediately repaired. The interior plaster work was extensively damaged by subsequent exposure to rain. In 1995, a committee was formed to restore the building. The roof was repaired and the exterior appearance has been restored, but interior restoration is not complete.
