= Rosemary Clooney =

American singer and actress (1928–2002)

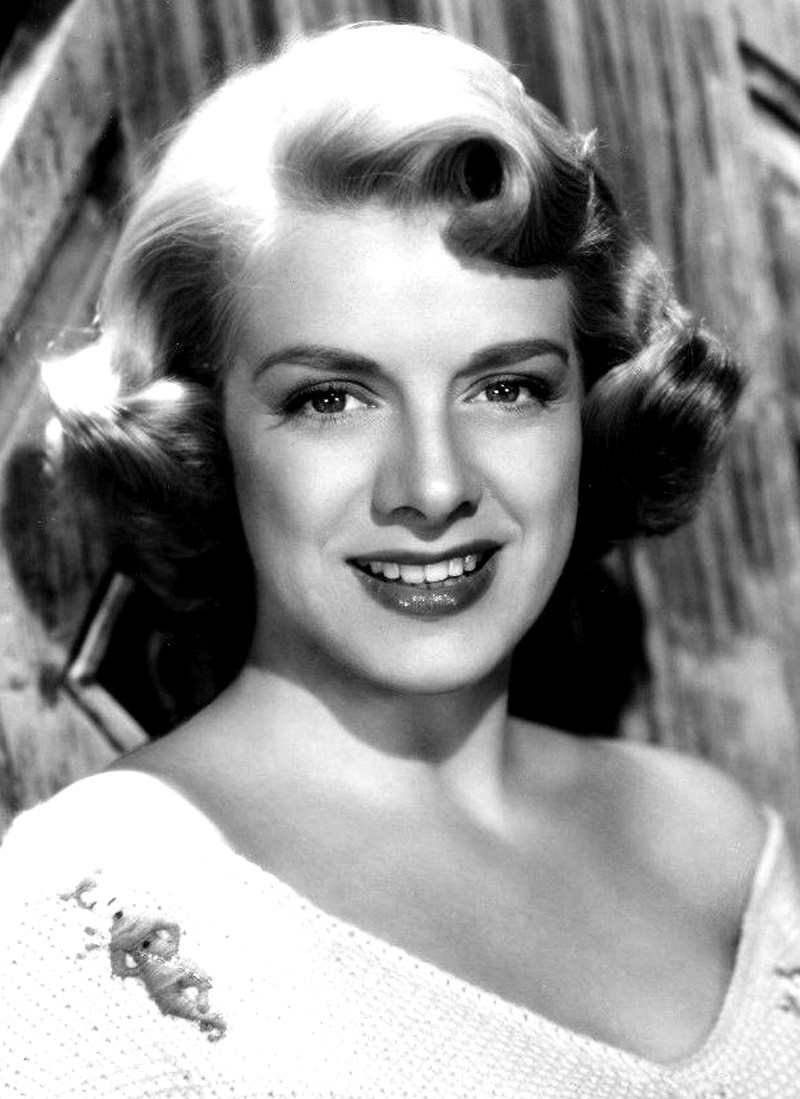
- Clooney in 1954
- Born: Rose Mary Clooney; May 23, 1928; Maysville, Kentucky, U.S.
- Died: June 29, 2002 (aged 74); Beverly Hills, California, U.S.
- Resting place: Saint Patrick's Cemetery, Maysville
- Occupations: Singer; actress; author
- Years active: 1946–2002
- Known for: White Christmas; Come On-a My House; Botch-a-Me; Mambo Italiano; Tenderly; Half as Much; Hey There; This Ole House
- Spouses: José Ferrer (m. 1953; div. 1961) (m. 1964; div. 1967) Dante DiPaolo (m. 1997)
- Children: 5, including Miguel Ferrer
- Relatives: Betty Clooney (sister); Nick Clooney (brother); George Clooney (nephew); Tessa Ferrer (granddaughter); Debby Boone (daughter-in-law)
- Musical career
- Genres: Traditional pop; vocal jazz
- Labels: Columbia; MGM; Coral; RCA Victor; Reprise; Dot; United Artists; Concord Jazz
- Website: Rosemary Clooney Palladium website Rosemary Clooney House

Rosemary Clooney (May 23, 1928 – June 29, 2002) was an American pop and jazz singer and actress. She came to prominence with the song "Come On-a My House" (1951), which was followed by "Tenderly" (1951), "Half as Much" (1952), "Botch-a-Me" (1952), "Mambo Italiano" (1954), "Hey There" (1954), "This Ole House" (1954), and "Sway" (1960), a remake of "¿Quién será?". In total, her discography includes 49 studio albums, 33 compilation albums, six live albums, four video albums, one soundtrack album, and three box sets.

Clooney's career languished in the 1960s due to her pregnancies, bipolar disorder, and drug addictions, but was revived in 1976, when her White Christmas co-star Bing Crosby invited her on his 50th anniversary tour. Clooney continued recording until her death in 2002. She was the mother of actor Miguel Ferrer and the aunt of actor George Clooney. A heavy smoker, Clooney died of lung cancer at age 74.

== Early life ==
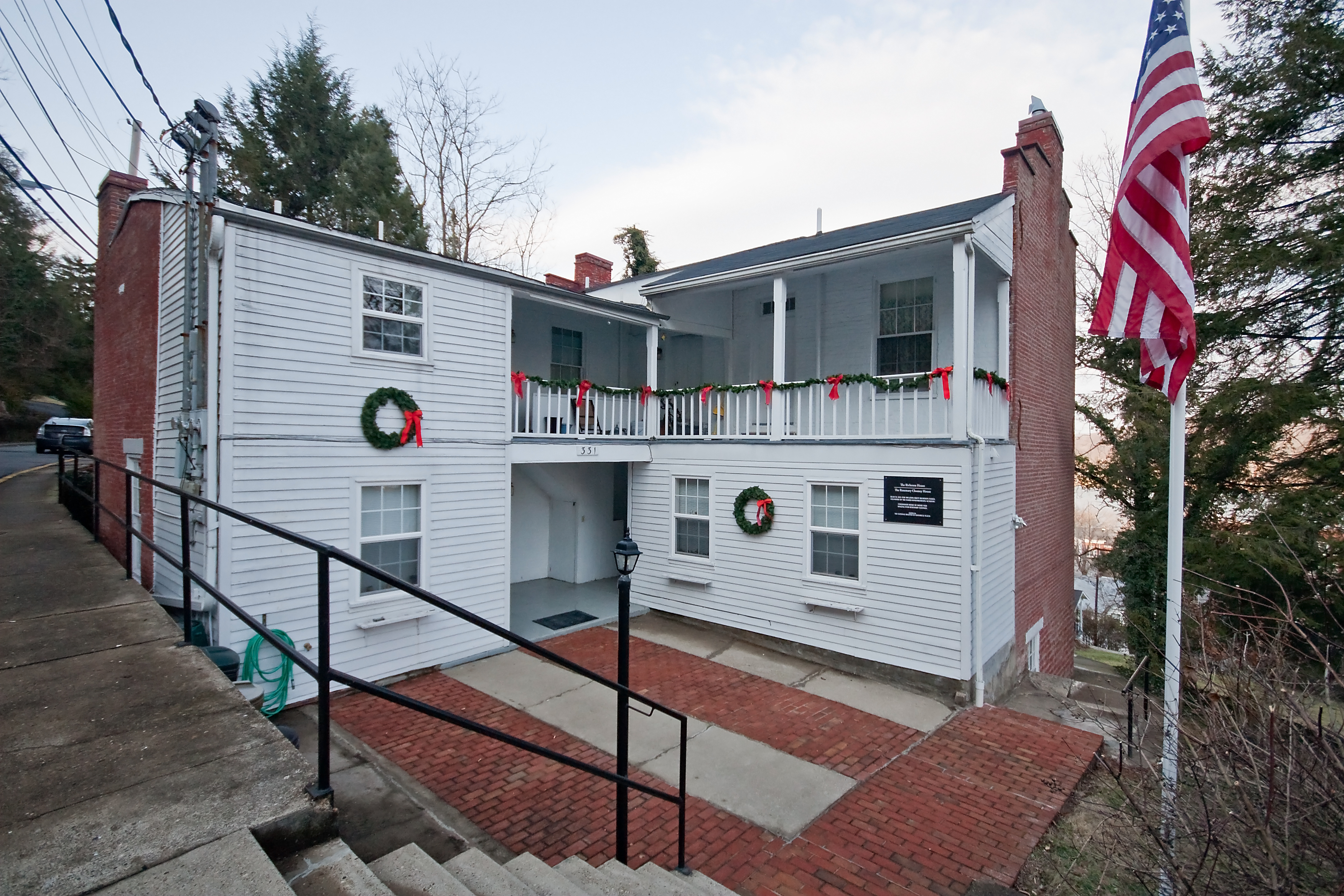
John Brett Richeson House in Maysville

Rosemary Clooney was born on May 23, 1928, in Maysville, Kentucky, the daughter of Marie Frances (née Guilfoyle), of Irish ancestry, and Andrew Joseph Clooney, of Irish and German descent. Her father was an alcoholic who was often jailed for public drunkenness and struggled to make a living, while her mother traveled often for her dress business. Her younger brother, Andy, drowned in the Ohio River as a young boy. Clooney was raised Catholic. When Rosemary was 15, her mother remarried and moved with Rosemary's brother Nick to California, while Rosemary and her sister Betty remained with their father. They resided in the John Brett Richeson House in the late 1940s. She moved between relatives and attended four high schools, all in the Cincinnati-area: Hughes, Withrow, Our Lady of Mercy, and Western Hills.

== Career ==
Clooney never received singing lessons or learned how to read sheet music. She and her sister Betty learned to sing by ear and began singing to attract crowds before their grandfather's campaign speeches for mayor of Maysville; he was elected three times. The performances built their confidence and gave them local recognition.

In 1945, Rosemary and Betty won a spot singing on the WLW radio station in Cincinnati, making $20 per week. While on the radio, in 1947, they were heard by Tony Pastor when he was in Cincinnati. Pastor was initially reluctant to take both sisters into his band as Betty was still under the age of 18 but hired them to record "I'm Sorry I Didn't Say Sorry", backed with "The Lady from Twenty-Nine Palms". The Clooneys recorded 14 songs with the Pastor band.

Rosemary signed to Columbia Records and made her solo recording debut in mid-1949 with "Bargain Day" and "Cabaret".

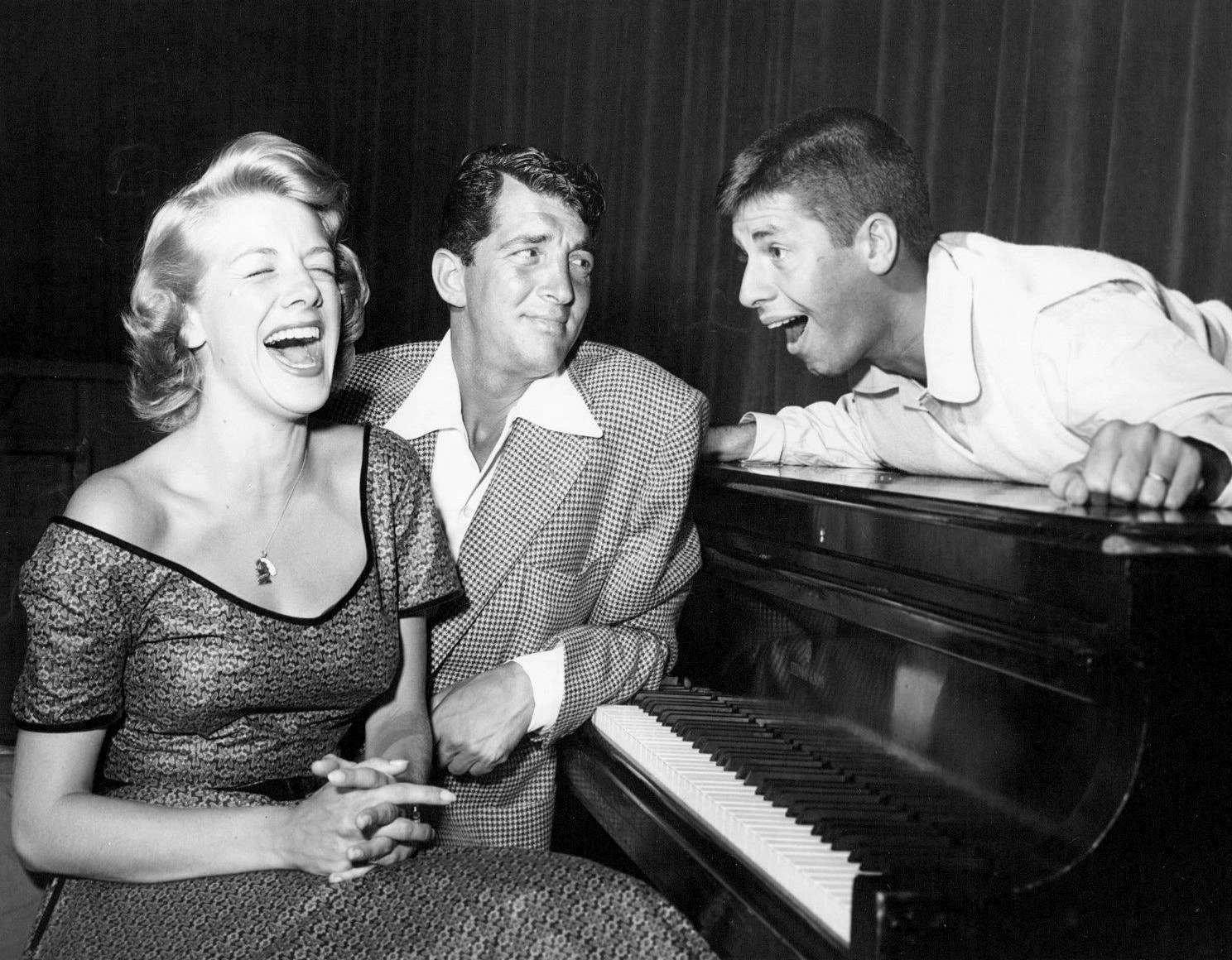
Rosemary Clooney, Dean Martin, and Jerry Lewis on The Colgate Comedy Hour (1952)

In 1950 and 1951, Clooney was a regular on the CBS Radio and television versions of Songs for Sale. In early 1951, she had a minor hit with "Beautiful Brown Eyes".

Clooney's recording of "Come On-a My House" (1951), produced by Mitch Miller, became her first big chart hit. The song was a novelty pop song that Clooney did not like and required her to sing with an accent, but Miller forced her to record it to keep her recording contract. The song sold over 1 million copies and it propelled her to stardom. Clooney's first royalty check from the song was $130,000.

In 1951 and 1952, Clooney made several guest appearances on Faye Emerson's Wonderful Town on CBS. She also made several guest appearances on the Arthur Godfrey radio show. They did duets as he played his ukulele, and other times, Clooney sang one of her latest hits.

Clooney made several duets with Marlene Dietrich, released on the EP Rosie and Marlene (1953).

In 1954, Clooney starred, along with Bing Crosby, Danny Kaye, and Vera-Ellen, in the movie White Christmas. During the production, Clooney realized she could not dance, so she began taking dance lessons from Dante DiPaolo; they fell madly in love.

In 1956, she starred in a half-hour syndicated television musical-variety show, The Rosemary Clooney Show, which featured The Hi-Lo's singing group and Nelson Riddle's orchestra. In 1957, the show moved to NBC prime time as The Lux Show Starring Rosemary Clooney, but it lasted only one season. It featured the singing group The Modernaires and Frank DeVol's orchestra.

Clooney often appeared with Bing Crosby on television, such as in the 1957 special The Edsel Show, and they made a concert tour of Ireland together. In November 1957, she appeared on NBC's The Ford Show, a frequent entry in the "Top 20" and featuring a musical group called "The Top Twenty". In 1960, Clooney and Crosby co-starred in The Bing Crosby – Rosemary Clooney Show, a 20-minute CBS Radio program that aired before the midday news each weekday.

Clooney had 16 songs make the Billboard pop chart from 1951 to 1956.

Clooney's last major chart hit was a jazz-infused vocal rendition of "I've Grown Accustomed to Her Face", released in May 1956.

Between 1955 and 1960, Clooney gave birth to 5 children, which impaired her ability to tour or promote her music during this time.

Clooney left Columbia in 1958. She made several recordings for MGM Records and then some for Coral Records. In 1958, she signed with RCA Victor, where she recorded until 1963. In 1958, she recorded Fancy Meeting You Here, an album of duets with Bing Crosby. In 1964, Clooney recorded for Reprise Records, and in 1965, Dot Records.

A one-off single for Dot, "Let Me Down Easy", in 1968 was the last new material Clooney released for eight years as she spent most of that time recovering from a severe mental breakdown and substance abuse issues.

In the mid-1970s, Clooney started to rebuild her career by playing at smaller venues such as Holiday Inn lounges.

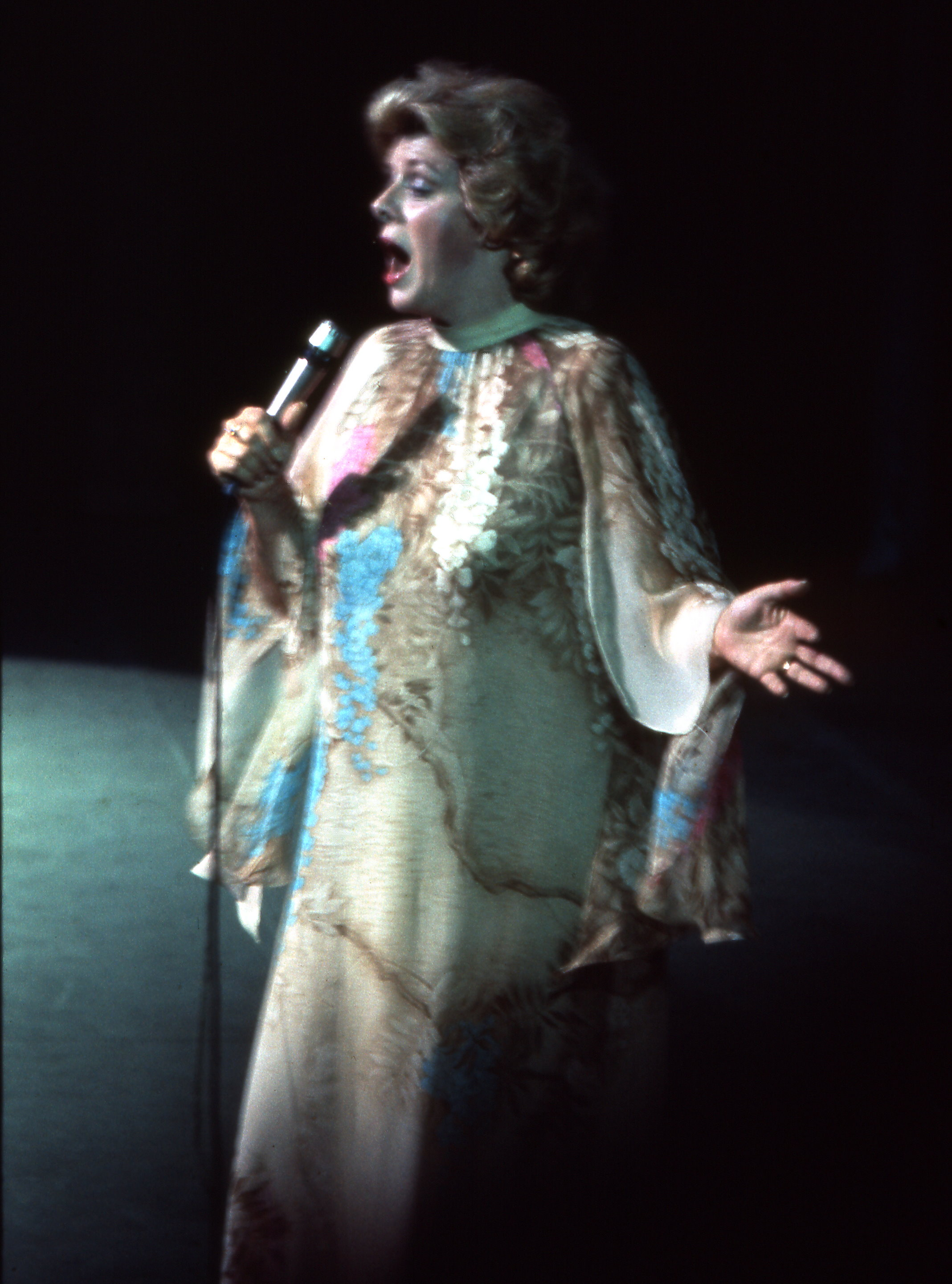
Clooney performing in 1977

In 1976, Clooney recorded two albums for United Artists Records, the first new LP she had released in more than a decade.

Also in 1976, Clooney was invited by her friend, Merv Griffin to appear on his show and she was invited by Bing Crosby to join his 50th anniversary tour.

From 1977 until her death, she recorded an album every year for Concord Jazz.

From 1978 to 1985, Clooney was the spokesperson in television commercials for Coronet paper towels by Georgia-Pacific, during which she sang the jingle, "Extra value is what you get, when you buy Coronet."

Clooney sang a duet with Wild Man Fischer on "It's a Hard Business" (1986).

She sang a duet of "Green Eyes" with Barry Manilow for his album, Singin' with the Big Bands (1994).

In 1994, Clooney guest-starred in the NBC television medical drama ER (starring her nephew, George Clooney); she received a Primetime Emmy Award nomination for Outstanding Guest Actress in a Drama Series for her performance.

In January 1996, Clooney sang "When October Goes" on Garrison Keillor's Prairie Home Companion radio program.

Clooney was awarded the Ella Lifetime Achievement Award by the Society of Singers in 1998.

In 1999, Clooney founded the Rosemary Clooney Music Festival, held annually in Maysville, her hometown to benefit the restoration of the Russell Theater in Maysville, where Clooney's first film, The Stars Are Singing, premiered in 1953. Clooney performed at the festival every year until her death.

Clooney received the Grammy Lifetime Achievement Award in February 2002.

== Personal life ==
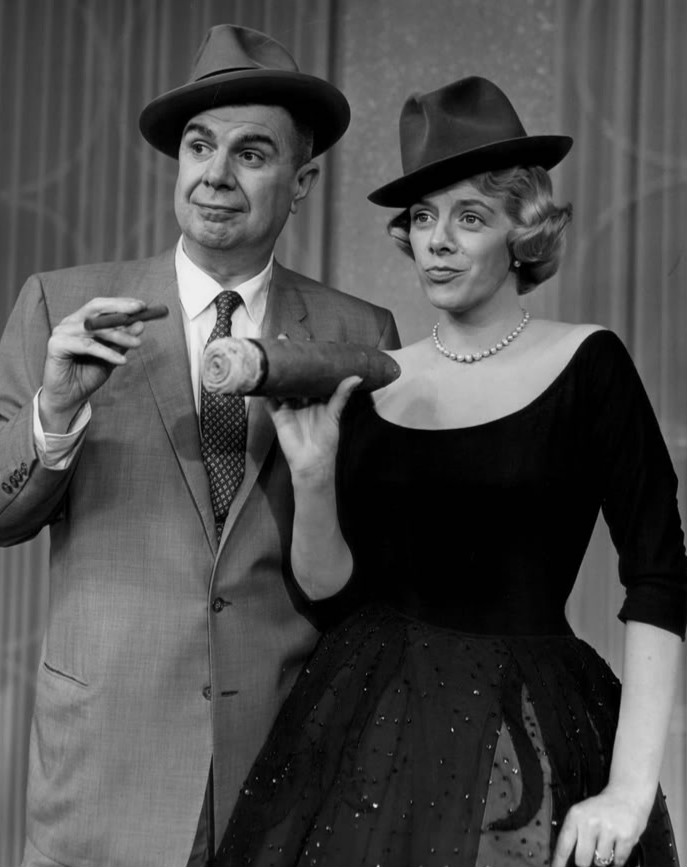
With Ken Murray on The Lux Show Starring Rosemary Clooney (1957)

Clooney was married twice to José Ferrer. They first married on July 13, 1953, in Durant, Oklahoma. They moved to Santa Monica, California, in 1954, and then to Los Angeles in 1958. Together, the couple had five children; son Miguel Ferrer also became an actor. Clooney and Ferrer divorced for the first time in 1961; Ferrer had cheated frequently. As the relationship was ending, Clooney had an affair with bandleader Nelson Riddle.

Clooney remarried Ferrer on November 22, 1964, in Los Angeles. However, they divorced again in 1967 as Ferrer had an affair with Stella Magee, who later became his last wife.

In the spring of 1968, Clooney's boyfriend of two years, a drummer 15 years younger than her, walked out on her. On June 5, 1968, as she was standing with her children waiting to greet close friend Robert F. Kennedy, he was assassinated. These two events affected her psychologically and she became depressed and addicted to sleeping pills, tranquilizers, and other prescription drugs. In July 1968, she had a nervous breakdown onstage in Reno, Nevada, where she shouted insults at her audience and had to be removed from the stage. She called a press conference to announce her retirement, but cried hysterically and ran off, driving into oncoming traffic. She was hospitalized and underwent traumatic confinement in a double locked room in a psychotic ward due to her violent nature. There, she was diagnosed with addiction and bipolar disorder. She then gained 60 pounds.

Clooney's sister Betty died at age 45 of a brain aneurysm in 1976, and she subsequently started a foundation in memory of and named after Betty.

In 1983, Clooney and her brother Nick co-chaired the Betty Clooney Foundation for the Brain-Injured, founded by their cousin, Sherman Holvey. It addresses the needs of survivors of cognitive disabilities caused by strokes, tumors, and brain damage from trauma or age.

In November 1997, Clooney married her longtime friend and a former dancer, Dante DiPaolo in her Kentucky hometown.

=== Autobiographies ===
In 1977, Clooney wrote her first autobiography, This for Remembrance: The Autobiography of Rosemary Clooney, an Irish-American Singer, written in collaboration with Raymond Strait and published by Playboy Press in 1977. Clooney's friend Bing Crosby wrote the introduction. Katherine Coker adapted the book for Jackie Cooper, who produced and directed the television movie, Rosie: The Rosemary Clooney Story (1982) starring Sondra Locke (who lip synced Clooney's songs), Penelope Milford as Betty, and Tony Orlando as José Ferrer.

In 1999, Clooney published her second autobiography, Girl Singer: An Autobiography.

=== Lung cancer and death ===
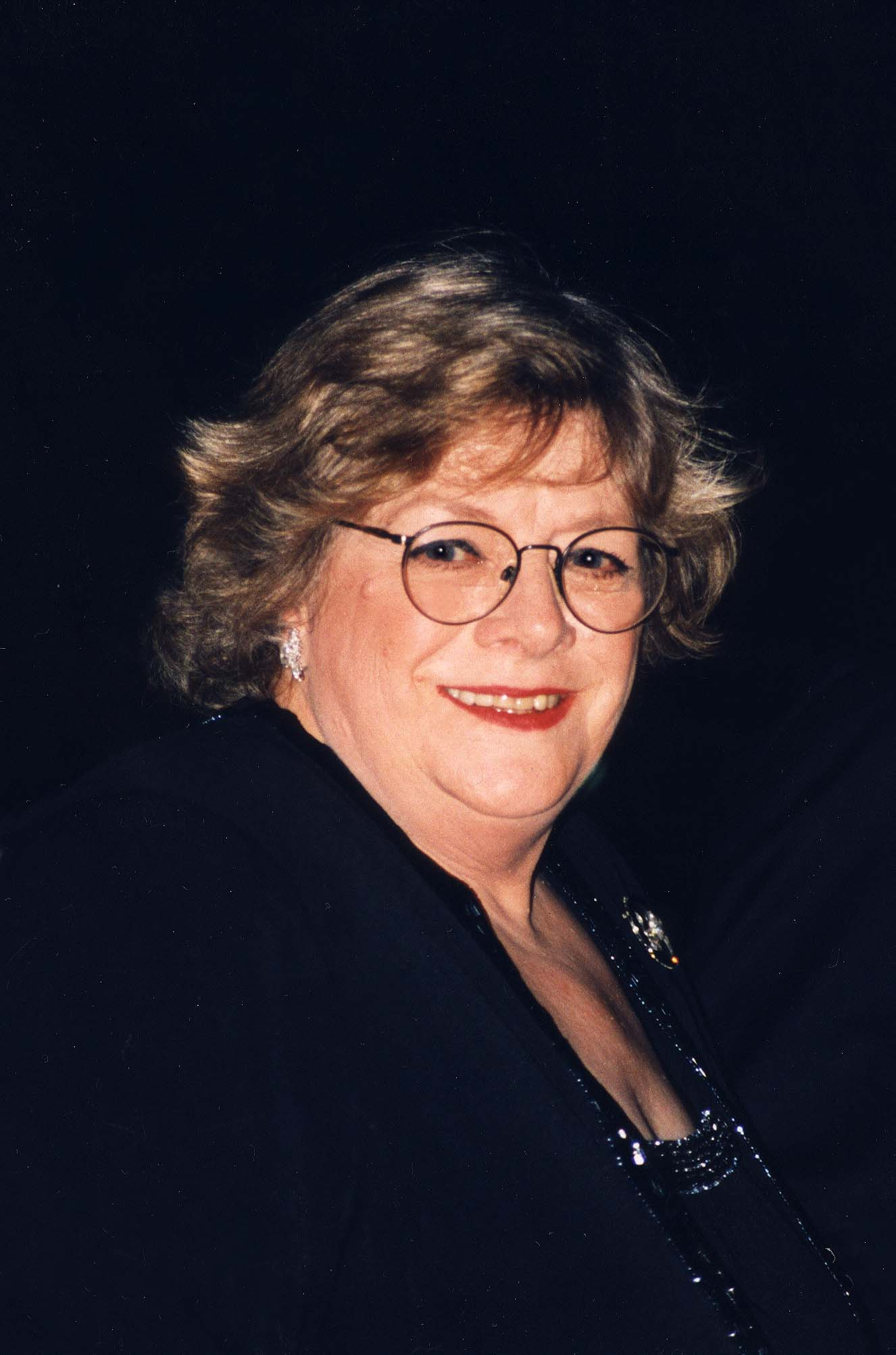
Clooney in 1997

Clooney was a lifelong heavy smoker. In 1996, Clooney was hospitalized with acute respiratory failure. Her doctors implored her to quit smoking but her difficulties led her to ask her son to bring her cigarettes in the hospital, although she did quit smoking that year.

While performing on tour in late 2001, Clooney struggled with breathing. At a family gathering for Christmas in 2001, she was only able to walk up two steps at a time. In January 2002, she was diagnosed with stage IIIA non–small cell lung cancer. The next day, she underwent surgery at the Mayo Clinic to remove the upper lobe of her left lung. She stayed in Rochester, Minnesota to recover; a series of infections delayed her recovery. She died in her sleep on June 29, 2002, at age 74 at her Beverly Hills home. A funeral was held at St. Patrick's Church in Maysville, Kentucky; she is buried in the church cemetery.

=== Residences ===
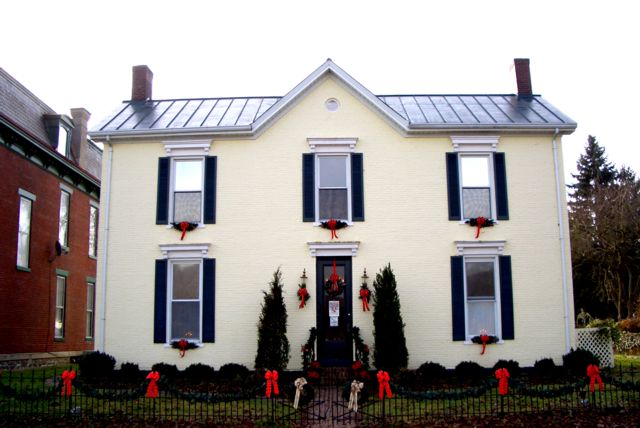
Clooney's Riverside Home in Augusta, Kentucky

In 1953, Clooney bought the house formerly owned by George and Ira Gershwin at 1019 North Roxbury Drive, Beverly Hills, California. It was sold after her death in 2002 for just under $8 million and sold again for $9 million in 2005. It has since been demolished.

In 1980, Clooney purchased a second home, a former hotel built in 1835–1840, on Riverside Drive in Augusta, Kentucky, near Maysville, her childhood hometown. In 2004, former Miss America Heather French Henry acquired the house and spent another $100,000 on renovations, reopening it as the Rosemary Clooney Museum, a historic house museum, with collections of her personal items and memorabilia from many of her films and singing performances.

=== Legacy ===
In March 2003, Clooney was inducted into the Kentucky Women Remembered exhibit, and her portrait by Alison Lyne is on permanent display in the Kentucky State Capitol's rotunda.

In May 2003, Bette Midler, recorded Bette Midler Sings the Rosemary Clooney Songbook with Barry Manilow, which was certified gold by the Recording Industry Association of America and nominated for a Grammy Award in 2004.

In 2005, the album Reflections of Rosemary by Debby Boone was released. Boone, who was Clooney's daughter-in-law, intended the album to be a musical portrait of Clooney "from a family perspective".

In September 2007, a mural honoring moments from Clooney's life was painted in downtown Maysville; it highlights the 1953 premiere of The Stars Are Singing and her singing career. It was painted by Louisiana muralists Robert Dafford, Herb Roe, and Brett Chigoy as part of the Maysville Floodwall Murals project.

== Filmography ==
- Tony Pastor and His Orchestra (1947 short subject)
- The Stars Are Singing (1953) as Terry Brennan
- Here Come the Girls (1953) as Daisy Crockett
- Red Garters (1954) as Calaveras Kate
- White Christmas (1954) as Betty Haynes
- Deep in My Heart (1954; cameo appearance) as Performer in 'That Midnight Girl'
- Conquest of Space (1955) as Musical Number (uncredited) (archive footage)
- The Joker's Wild (1968, TV Movie)
- Twilight Theater (1982, TV Movie)
- Hardcastle and McCormick (1986, TV Series) as Millie Denton
- Sister Margaret and the Saturday Night Ladies (1987, TV Movie) as Sarah
- Radioland Murders (1994) as Anna
- ER (1994, TV Series) as Mary Cavanaugh / 'Madame X'
- LateLine (1999, TV Series) as Special Guest Mother

== Radio broadcasts ==
Year	Program	Episode/source
1953	Suspense	St. James Infirmary
