= The Stars Are Singing =

1953 film by Norman Taurog

- Directed by: Norman Taurog
- Screenplay by: Liam O'Brien
- Story by: Paul Hervey Fox
- Produced by: Irving Asher
- Starring: Rosemary Clooney; Anna Maria Alberghetti; Lauritz Melchior
- Cinematography: Lionel Lindon
- Edited by: Arthur P. Schmidt
- Music by: Victor Young (uncredited)
- Distributed by: Paramount Pictures
- Release date: March 11, 1953
- Running time: 99 minutes
- Country: United States
- Language: English

The Stars Are Singing is a 1953 Paramount Pictures musical directed by Norman Taurog and starring Rosemary Clooney, Anna Maria Alberghetti, and Lauritz Melchior. Clooney performs her hit song "Come On-a My House" and Danish tenor Lauritz Melchior sings "Vesti la giubba" from Leoncavallo's opera Pagliacci in this Technicolor production.

== Plot ==
A 15-year-old Polish girl attempts to enter the U.S. illegally, setting off a major search by immigration officials. She is befriended by a struggling group of New York performers, who try to get approval for her to remain in the country.

== Cast ==
- Rosemary Clooney as Terry Brennan
- Anna Maria Alberghetti as Katri Walenska
- Lauritz Melchior as Jan Poldi
- Bob Williams as Homer Tirdell
- Tom Morton as Buddy Fraser
- Fred Clark as McDougall
- John Archer as Dave Parish
- Mikhail Rasumny as Ladowski
- Lloyd Corrigan as Miller
- Don Wilson as Radio Announcer
- Otto Waldis as Ship's Captain Goslak
- Henry Guttman as Ship's Mate
- Paul E. Burns as Henryk
- Freeman Lusk as Conway

== Production ==
The film cost $1,264,337 and earned an estimated $1.6 million at the North American box office in 1953.

== Release ==
The film's world premier was in Clooney's home town, Maysville, Kentucky, at the Russell Theatre.
