= Elizabethtown Armory =

- U.S. National Register of Historic Places
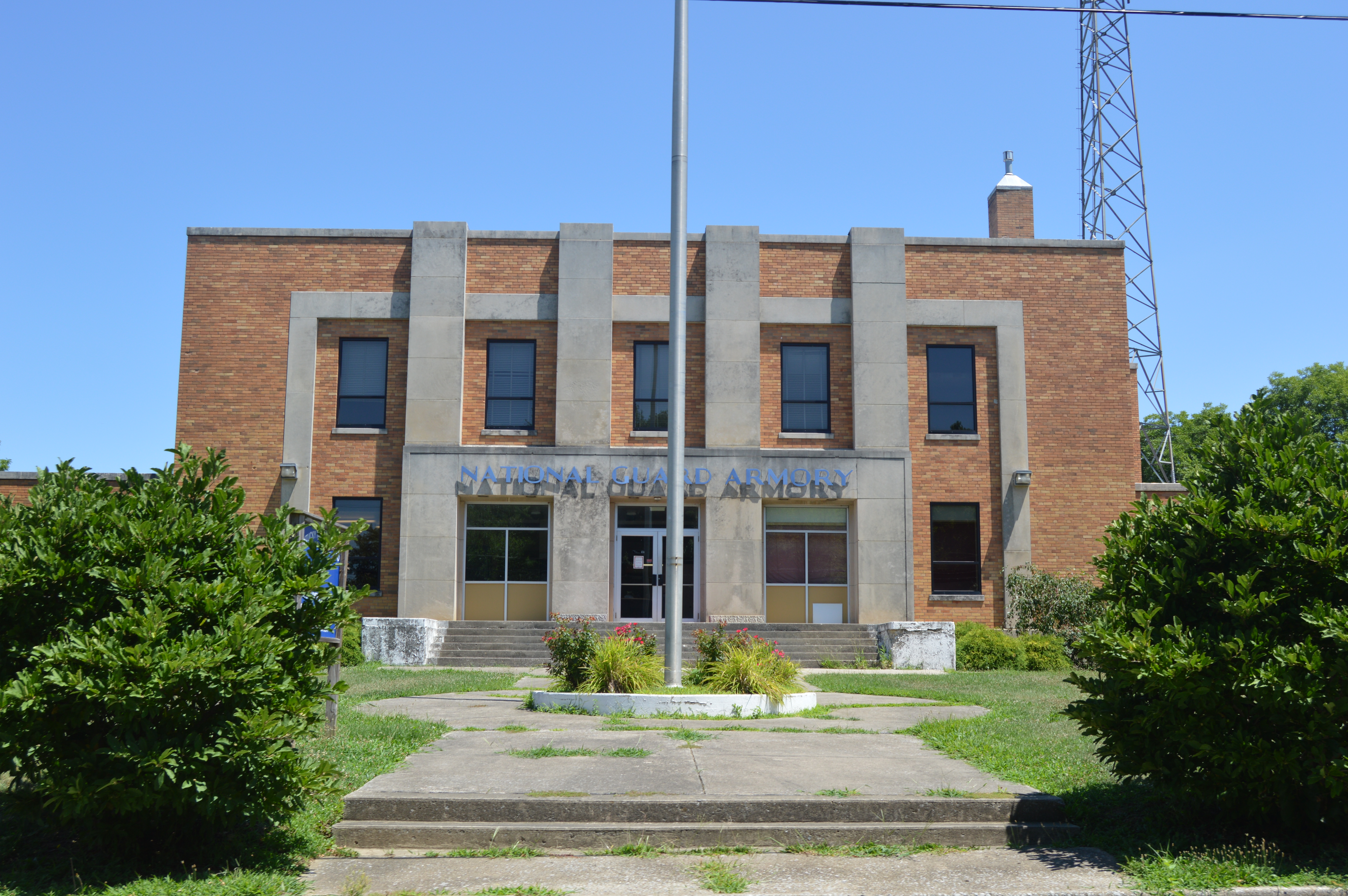
- Location: 205 Warfield St., Elizabethtown, Kentucky
- Coordinates: 37°41′57″N 85°51′22″W
- Area: 1.9 acres (0.77 ha)
- Built: 1948
- Built by: Wehr Construction Co.
- Architect: Frankel and Curtis
- Architectural style: Modern Movement
- MPS: Kentucky's National Guard Facilities MPS
- NRHP reference No.: 02000921
- Added to NRHP: September 6, 2002

The Elizabethtown Armory, at 205 Warfield St. in Elizabethtown, Kentucky, was built in 1948 for the Kentucky National Guard. It was listed on the National Register of Historic Places in 2002.

It is a two-story yellow brick Modern Movement-style building with a two-story five-bay central block and one-story wings.

It was deemed significant "because of its association with the National Guard in Elizabethtown, and for its use as a community center for the citizens of the city. Besides its military duties, the armory has served as a community center for Elizabethtown. The Guard used to hold an annual bean soup dinner at the armory, and wrestling matches, basketball games, trade shows, and wedding receptions all take place in the armory drill hall."
