= 2024 Indiana Senate election =

- November 5, 2024

25 of the 50 seats in the Indiana Senate 26 seats needed for a majority
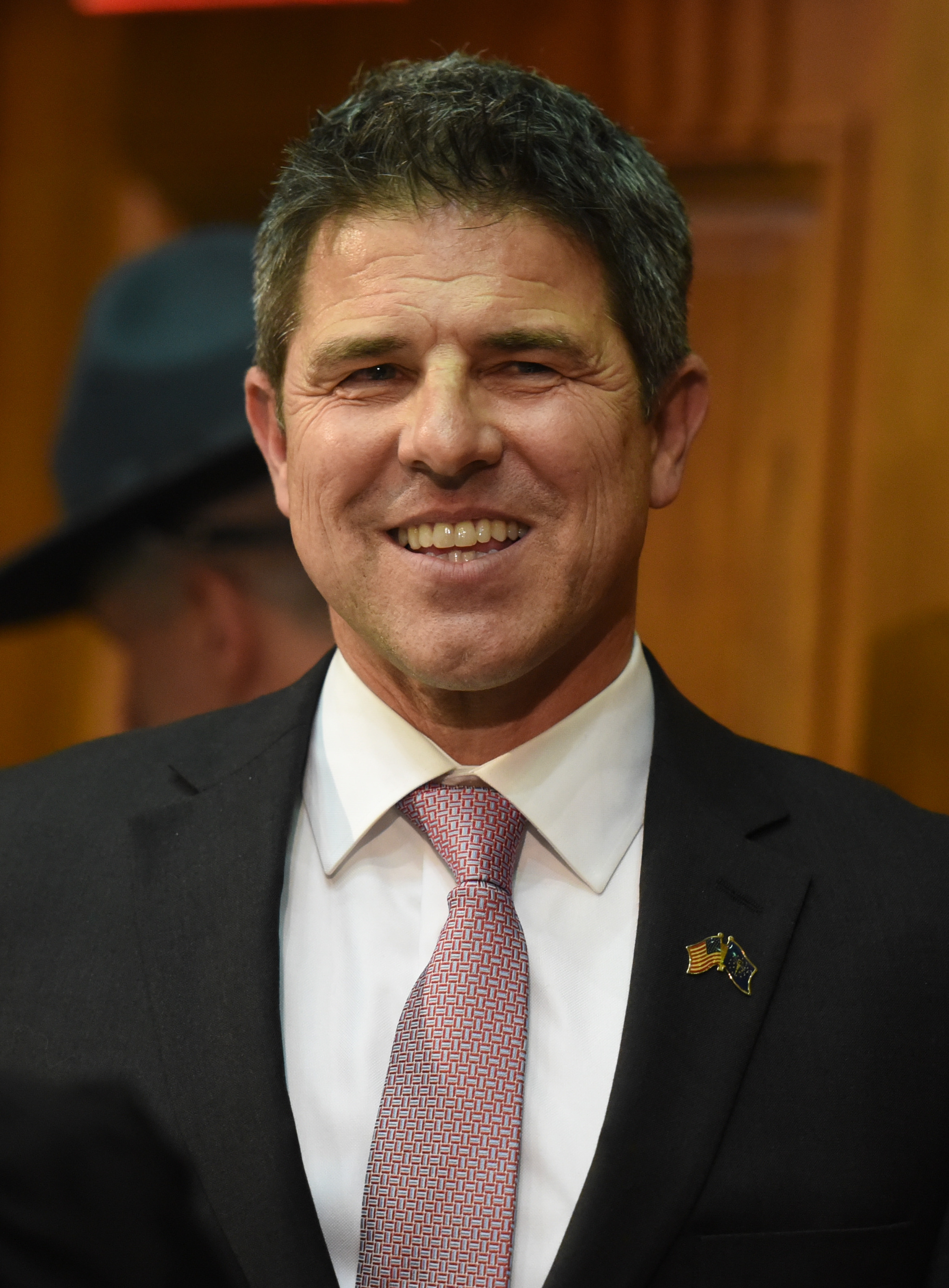

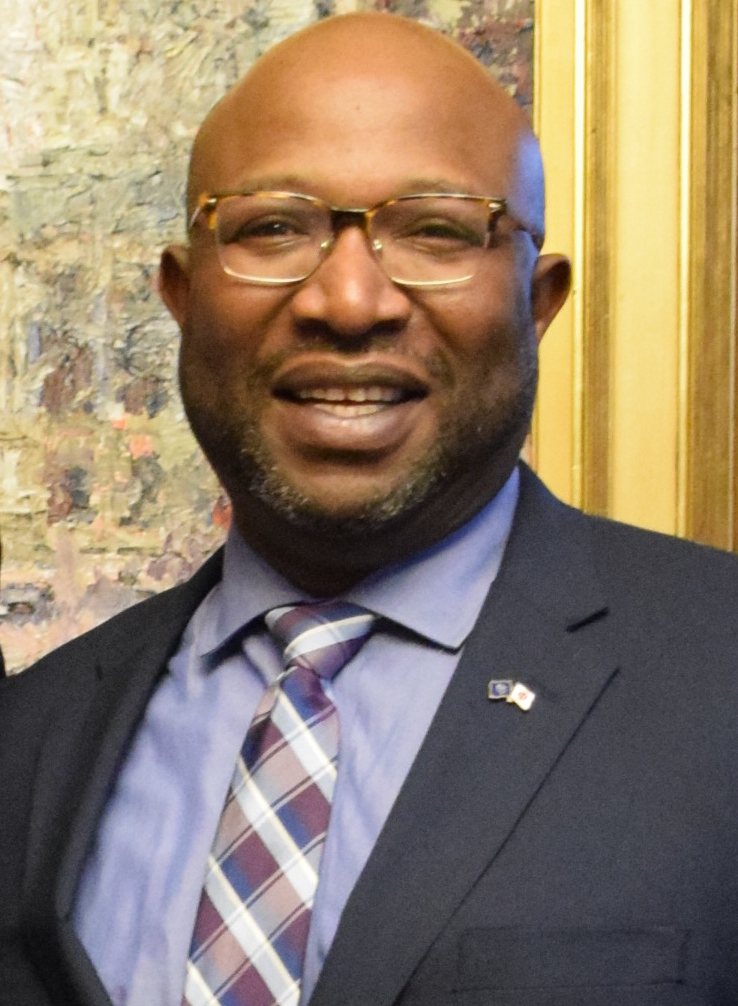
	Majority party	Minority party
Leader	Rodric Bray	Greg Taylor
Party	Republican	Democratic
Leader since	November 20, 2018	November 6, 2020
Leader's seat	37th district	33rd district
Seats before	40	10
Seats after	40	10
Seat change	Steady	Steady
Popular vote	783,615	421,033
Percentage	63.38%	34.05%
- Results of the elections: Republican hold Democratic hold No election
President pro tempore before election
Rodric Bray
Republican
Elected President pro tempore
Rodric Bray
Republican

The 2024 Indiana Senate election was held on November 5, 2024, as a part of the biennial elections in the U.S. state of Indiana, coinciding with other elections in the state, including for U.S. president, U.S. House, Indiana governor, and Indiana House, as well as various other state and local elections. The primary elections took place on May 7, 2024. Voters have elected members in 25 of the 50 seats in the Indiana Senate to serve four-year terms in single-member constituencies.

== Overview ==
2024 Indiana State Senate general election
Party	Votes	Percentage	% change	Seats before	Seats up	Candidates	Seats won	Seats after	+/–
Republican	783,615	63.38%	▼7.40%	40	18	20	18	40	Steady
Democratic	421,033	34.05%	▲4.83%	10	7	15	7	10	Steady
Libertarian	21,324	1.72%	▲1.72%	0	0	2	0	0	Steady
Independent	10,367	0.84%	▲0.84%	0	0	1	0	0	Steady
Totals	1,236,339	100.00%	—	50	25	38	25	50	—
Source: Indiana Election Division

== Predictions ==
Source	Ranking	As of
CNalysis	Solid R	February 29, 2024

== Retirements ==
One incumbent did not seek re-election.

=== Republicans ===
1. District 24: John Crane retired.

== Incumbents defeated ==
=== In primary election ===
One incumbent senator, a Democrat, was defeated in the May 7 primary election.

==== Democrats ====
1. District 3: David Vinzant lost nomination to a full term to Mark Spencer.

== Summary of results by district ==
Italics denote an open seat held by the incumbent party; bold text denotes a gain for a party.

- Districts that did not hold elections in 2024 are not listed below.

State senate district	Incumbent	Party	Elected senator	Outcome
2	Lonnie Randolph	Dem	Lonnie Randolph	Dem hold
3	David Vinzant	Dem	Mark Spencer	Dem hold
5	Ed Charbonneau	Rep	Ed Charbonneau	Rep hold
7	Brian Buchanan	Rep	Brian Buchanan	Rep hold
8	Mike Bohacek	Rep	Mike Bohacek	Rep hold
9	Ryan Mishler	Rep	Ryan Mishler	Rep hold
10	David L. Niezgodski	Dem	David L. Niezgodski	Dem hold
12	Blake Doriot	Rep	Blake Doriot	Rep hold
13	Sue Glick	Rep	Sue Glick	Rep hold
16	Justin Busch	Rep	Justin Busch	Rep hold
18	Stacey Donato	Rep	Stacey Donato	Rep hold
20	Scott Baldwin	Rep	Scott Baldwin	Rep hold
24	John Crane	Rep	Brett Clark	Rep hold
28	Michael Crider	Rep	Michael Crider	Rep hold
30	Fady Qaddoura	Dem	Fady Qaddoura	Dem hold
32	Aaron Freeman	Rep	Aaron Freeman	Rep hold
33	Greg Taylor	Dem	Greg Taylor	Dem hold
34	La Keisha Jackson	Dem	La Keisha Jackson	Dem hold
35	R. Michael Young	Rep	R. Michael Young	Rep hold
36	Cyndi Carrasco	Rep	Cyndi Carrasco	Rep hold
37	Rodric Bray	Rep	Rodric Bray	Rep hold
40	Shelli Yoder	Dem	Shelli Yoder	Dem hold
42	Jean Leising	Rep	Jean Leising	Rep hold
44	Eric Koch	Rep	Eric Koch	Rep hold
50	Vaneta Becker	Rep	Vaneta Becker	Rep hold

== Results ==
=== District 2 ===
The district had been represented by Democrat Lonnie Randolph since 2008. Randolph was re-elected unopposed of the vote in 2020.

==== Democratic primary ====
===== Candidates =====
====== Declared ======
- Lonnie Randolph, incumbent state senator

==== General election ====
District 2 results
Party	Candidate	Votes	%
Democratic	Lonnie Randolph (incumbent)	27,981	65.7
Republican	Humberto Prado	14,635	34.3
Total votes		42,616	100.0
Democratic hold			

=== District 3 ===
The district had been represented by Democrat Eddie Melton since 2016. He was re-elected unopposed in 2020. Melton resigned on December 5, 2023, following his election as mayor of Gary. David Vinzant was elected via caucus to finish Melton's term.

==== Democratic primary ====
===== Candidates =====
====== Declared ======
- Mark Spencer, Gary city councilor
- David Vinzant, incumbent state senator

====== Declined ======
- Eddie Melton, former state senator

Democratic primary results
Party	Candidate	Votes	%
Democratic	Mark Spencer	6,426	65.5
Democratic	David Vinzant (incumbent)	3,390	35.5
Total votes		9,816	100.0

==== Republican primary ====
===== Candidates =====
====== Declared ======
- Maya Angelou Brown
- Will Miller

Republican primary results
Party	Candidate	Votes	%
Republican	Will Miller	1,158	62.8
Republican	Maya Angelou Brown	685	37.2
Total votes		1,843	100.0

==== General election ====
District 3 results
Party	Candidate	Votes	%
Democratic	Mark Spencer	33,401	73.1
Republican	Will Miller	12,279	26.9
Total votes		45,680	100.0
Democratic hold			

=== District 5 ===
The district had been represented by Republican Ed Charbonneau since 2007. Charbonneau was re-elected with 65.8% of the vote in 2020.

==== Republican primary ====
===== Candidates =====
====== Declared ======
- Ed Charbonneau, incumbent state senator

==== Democratic primary ====
===== Candidates =====
====== Declared ======
- Leslie Bamesberger

==== General election ====
District 5 results
Party	Candidate	Votes	%
Republican	Ed Charbonneau (incumbent)	43,489	66.0
Democratic	Leslie Bamesberger	22,419	34.0
Total votes		65,908	100.0
Republican hold			

=== District 7 ===
The district had been represented by Republican Brian Buchanan since 2018. Buchanan was re-elected with 69.5% of the vote in 2020.

==== Republican primary ====
===== Candidates =====
====== Declared ======
- Joseph Bookwalter
- Brian Buchanan, incumbent state senator

====== Endorsements ======
Brian Buchanan

Organizations

- Indiana Farm Bureau AgELECT PAC
- Indiana Right to Life
- NRA Political Victory Fund

Republican primary results
Party	Candidate	Votes	%
Republican	Brian Buchanan (incumbent)	10,577	66.8
Republican	Joseph Bookwalter	5,259	33.2
Total votes		15,836	100.0

==== General election ====
District 7 results
Party	Candidate	Votes	%
Republican	Brian Buchanan (incumbent)	49,168	100.0
Total votes		49,168	100.0
Republican hold			

=== District 8 ===
The district had been represented by Republican Mike Bohacek since 2016. Bohacek was re-elected with 59.4% of the vote in 2020.

==== Republican primary ====
===== Candidates =====
====== Declared ======
- Mike Bohacek, incumbent state senator
- Spencer England
- Joe Layne

====== Endorsements ======
Joe Layne

Organizations

- Indiana Right to Life

Republican primary results
Party	Candidate	Votes	%
Republican	Mike Bohacek (incumbent)	5,950	44.4
Republican	Joe Layne	4,427	33.1
Republican	Spencer England	3,010	22.5
Total votes		13,387	100.0

==== Democratic primary ====
===== Candidates =====
====== Declared ======
- Leon Smith

==== General election ====
District 8 results
Party	Candidate	Votes	%
Republican	Mike Bohacek (incumbent)	42,545	71.7
Democratic	Leon Smith	16,782	28.3
Total votes		59,327	100.0
Republican hold			

=== District 9 ===
The district had been represented by Republican Ryan Mishler since 2004. Mishler was re-elected with 74.9% of the vote in 2020.

==== Republican primary ====
===== Candidates =====
====== Declared ======
- Ryan Mishler, incumbent state senator

==== General election ====
District 9 results
Party	Candidate	Votes	%
Republican	Ryan Mishler (incumbent)	42,276	100.0
Total votes		42,276	100.0
Republican hold			

=== District 10 ===
The district had been represented by Democrat David L. Niezgodski since 2016. Niezgodski was re-elected unopposed in 2020.

==== Democratic primary ====
===== Candidates =====
====== Declared ======
- David L. Niezgodski, incumbent state senator
- Tim Swager, St. Joseph County treasurer

Democratic primary results
Party	Candidate	Votes	%
Democratic	David L. Niezgodski (incumbent)	3,716	62.2
Democratic	Tim Swager	2,263	37.8
Total votes		5,979	100.0

==== Libertarian convention ====
===== Candidates =====
====== Declared ======
- Tim Cotton

==== General election ====
District 10 results
Party	Candidate	Votes	%
Democratic	David L. Niezgodski (incumbent)	30,420	77.8
Libertarian	Tim Cotton	8,686	22.2
Total votes		39,106	100.0
Democratic hold			

=== District 12 ===
The district had been represented by Republican Blake Doriot since 2016. Doriot was re-elected with 68.5% of the vote in 2020.

==== Republican primary ====
===== Candidates =====
====== Declared ======
- Blake Doriot, incumbent state senator

==== General election ====
District 12 results
Party	Candidate	Votes	%
Republican	Blake Doriot (incumbent)	33,582	100.0
Total votes		33,582	100.0
Republican hold			

=== District 13 ===
The district had been represented by Republican Sue Glick since 2010. Glick was re-elected unopposed in 2020.

==== Republican primary ====
===== Candidates =====
====== Declared ======
- Sue Glick, incumbent state senator

==== General election ====
District 13 results
Party	Candidate	Votes	%
Republican	Sue Glick (incumbent)	41,096	100.0
Total votes		41,096	100.0
Republican hold			

=== District 16 ===
The district had been represented by Republican Justin Busch since 2018. Busch was re-elected with 57.9% of the vote in 2020.

==== Republican primary ====
===== Candidates =====
====== Declared ======
- Justin Busch, incumbent state senator
- Scott Wise

====== Endorsements ======
Justin Busch

Organizations

- NRA Political Victory Fund

Republican primary results
Party	Candidate	Votes	%
Republican	Justin Busch (incumbent)	9,034	68.8
Republican	Scott Wise	4,105	31.2
Total votes		13,139	100.0

==== General election ====
District 16 results
Party	Candidate	Votes	%
Republican	Justin Busch (incumbent)	45,442	100.0
Total votes		45,442	100.0
Republican hold			

=== District 18 ===
The district had been represented by Republican Stacey Donato since 2019. Donato was re-elected with 73.3% of the vote in 2020.

==== Republican primary ====
===== Candidates =====
====== Declared ======
- Stacey Donato, incumbent state senator

==== General election ====
District 18 results
Party	Candidate	Votes	%
Republican	Stacey Donato (incumbent)	45,901	100.0
Total votes		45,901	100.0
Republican hold			

=== District 20 ===
The district had been represented by Republican Scott Baldwin since 2021. Baldwin was re-elected with 62.5% of the vote in 2020.

==== Republican primary ====
===== Candidates =====
====== Declared ======
- Scott Baldwin, incumbent state senator

==== Democratic primary ====
===== Candidates =====
====== Declared ======
- Joel Levi, pharmacy technician

==== General election ====
District 20 results
Party	Candidate	Votes	%
Republican	Scott Baldwin (incumbent)	43,886	59.9
Democratic	Joel Levi	29,380	40.1
Total votes		73,266	100.0
Republican hold			

=== District 24 ===
The district had been represented by Republican John Crane since 2016. Crane was re-elected with 65.5% of the vote in 2020. In August 2023, Crane announced he would not seek re-election.

==== Republican primary ====
===== Candidates =====
====== Declared ======
- Brett Clark, sheriff
- Anne Engelhardt

====== Declined ======
- John Crane, incumbent state senator

====== Endorsements ======
Brett Clark

Organizations

- Indiana Farm Bureau AgELECT PAC
- NRA Political Victory Fund

Republican primary results
Party	Candidate	Votes	%
Republican	Brett Clark	9,729	75.5
Republican	Anne Engelhardt	3,158	24.5
Total votes		12,887	100.0

==== Democratic primary ====
===== Candidates =====
====== Declared ======
- Veronica Pejril, former Greencastle city councilor

==== General election ====
District 24 results
Party	Candidate	Votes	%
Republican	Brett Clark	40,337	65.6
Democratic	Veronica Pejril	21,185	34.4
Total votes		61,522	100.0
Republican hold			

=== District 28 ===
The district had been represented by Republican Michael Crider since 2012. Crider was re-elected with 62.6% of the vote in 2020.

==== Republican primary ====
===== Candidates =====
====== Declared ======
- Michael Crider, incumbent state senator

==== General election ====
District 28 results
Party	Candidate	Votes	%
Republican	Michael Crider (incumbent)	44,687	78.0
Libertarian	Travis Chittum	12,638	22.0
Total votes		57,325	100.0
Republican hold			

=== District 30 ===
The district had been represented by Democrat Fady Qaddoura since 2020. Qaddoura was re-elected with 52.6% of the vote in 2020.

==== Democratic primary ====
===== Candidates =====
====== Declared ======
- Fady Qaddoura, incumbent state senator

==== General election ====
District 30 results
Party	Candidate	Votes	%
Democratic	Fady Qaddoura (incumbent)	47,526	100.0
Total votes		47,526	100.0
Democratic hold			

=== District 32 ===
The district had been represented by Republican Aaron Freeman since 2016. Freeman was re-elected with 59.0% of the vote in 2020.

==== Republican primary ====
===== Candidates =====
====== Declared ======
- Aaron Freeman, incumbent state senator

==== Democratic primary ====
===== Candidates =====
====== Declared ======
- Katrina Owens

====== Disqualified ======
- David Nicholson

==== General election ====
District 32 results
Party	Candidate	Votes	%
Republican	Aaron Freeman (incumbent)	34,243	60.5
Democratic	Katrina Owens	22,368	39.5
Total votes		56,611	100.0
Republican hold			

=== District 33 ===
The district had been represented by Democrat Greg Taylor since 2008. Taylor was re-elected unopposed in 2020.

==== Democratic primary ====
===== Candidates =====
====== Declared ======
- Greg Taylor, incumbent state senator

==== General election ====
District 33 results
Party	Candidate	Votes	%
Democratic	Greg Taylor (incumbent)	42,134	100.0
Total votes		42,134	100.0
Democratic hold			

=== District 34 ===
The district had been represented by Democrat Jean Breaux since 2006. Breaux was re-elected unopposed in 2020. Although he had initially filed to run for re-election, on March 18, 2024, Senator Breaux chose to step down due to health issues. Two days later, Breaux died.

==== Democratic primary ====
===== Candidates =====
====== Disqualified ======
- Chunia Graves

====== Withdrawn ======
- Jean Breaux, incumbent state senator (name would appear on ballot)

==== General election ====
District 34 results
Party	Candidate	Votes	%
Democratic	La Keisha Jackson	36,165	100.0
Total votes		36,165	100.0
Democratic hold			

=== District 35 ===
The district had been represented by Republican R. Michael Young since 2000. Young was re-elected with 58.0% of the vote in 2020.

==== Republican primary ====
===== Candidates =====
====== Declared ======
- Philip Clay, banker
- R. Michael Young, incumbent state senator

====== Endorsements ======
Michael Young

Organizations

- NRA Political Victory Fund

Republican primary results
Party	Candidate	Votes	%
Republican	R. Michael Young (incumbent)	7,185	67.1
Republican	Philip Clay	3,521	32.9
Total votes		10,706	100.0

==== General election ====
District 35 results
Party	Candidate	Votes	%
Republican	R. Michael Young (incumbent)	24,689	56.9
Democratic	Jessica McCormick	18,707	43.1
Total votes		43,396	100.0
Republican hold			

=== District 36 ===
The district had been represented by Republican Jack Sandlin since 2016. Sandlin was re-elected with 53.9% of the vote in 2020. He died in September 2023. Cyndi Carrasco was elected via caucus to replace Sandlin.

==== Republican primary ====
===== Candidates =====
====== Declared ======
- Cyndi Carrasco, incumbent state senator

==== Democratic primary ====
===== Candidates =====
====== Declared ======
- Suzanne Fortenberry, courier and executive director of Greenwood Pride

==== General election ====
District 36 results
Party	Candidate	Votes	%
Republican	Cyndi Carrasco (incumbent)	30,274	62.5
Democratic	Suzanne Fortenberry	18,203	37.5
Total votes		48,477	100.0
Republican hold			

=== District 37 ===
The district had been represented by Republican Rodric Bray since 2012. Bray was re-elected unopposed in 2020.

==== Republican primary ====
===== Candidates =====
====== Declared ======
- Rodric Bray, incumbent state senator
- Jay Hart

====== Endorsements ======
Rodric Bray

Organizations

- Indiana Farm Bureau AgELECT PAC
- NRA Political Victory Fund

Republican primary results
Party	Candidate	Votes	%
Republican	Rodric Bray (incumbent)	10,453	63.0
Republican	Jay Hart	6,146	37.0
Total votes		16,599	100.0

==== Democratic primary ====
===== Candidates =====
====== Declared ======
- Kimberly Schofield

==== General election ====
District 37 results
Party	Candidate	Votes	%
Republican	Rodric Bray (incumbent)	50,188	75.9
Democratic	Kimberly Schofield	15,938	24.1
Total votes		66,126	100.0
Republican hold			

=== District 40 ===
The district had been represented by Democrat Shelli Yoder since 2020. Yoder was re-elected unopposed in 2020.

==== Democratic primary ====
===== Candidates =====
====== Declared ======
- Shelli Yoder, incumbent state senator

==== General election ====
District 40 results
Party	Candidate	Votes	%
Democratic	Shelli Yoder (incumbent)	38,424	100.0
Total votes		38,424	100.0
Democratic hold			

=== District 42 ===
The district had been represented by Republican Jean Leising since 2008. Leising was re-elected unopposed in 2020.

==== Republican primary ====
===== Candidates =====
====== Declared ======
- Jean Leising, incumbent state senator

Republican primary results
Party	Candidate	Votes	%
Republican	Jean Leising	15,608	100.0
Total votes		15,608	100.0

==== Democratic primary ====
===== Candidates =====
====== Declared ======
- Ryan Retzner

Democratic primary results
Party	Candidate	Votes	%
Democratic	Ryan Retzner	1,621	100.0
Total votes		1,621	100.0

==== General election ====
Ryan Retzner will not appear on the ballot for the general election.

District 42 results
Party	Candidate	Votes	%
Republican	Jean Leising (incumbent)	52,778	100.0
Total votes		52,778	100.0
Republican hold			

=== District 44 ===
The district had been represented by Republican Eric Koch since 2016. Koch was re-elected with 73.0% of the vote in 2020.

==== Republican primary ====
===== Candidates =====
====== Declared ======
- Eric Koch, incumbent state senator

==== General election ====
District 44 results
Party	Candidate	Votes	%
Republican	Eric Koch (incumbent)	48,749	100.0
Total votes		48,749	100.0
Republican hold			

=== District 50 ===
The district had been represented by Republican Vaneta Becker since 2005. Becker was re-elected unopposed in 2020.

==== Republican primary ====
===== Candidates =====
====== Declared ======
- Vaneta Becker, incumbent state senator

==== General election ====
District 50 results
Party	Candidate	Votes	%
Republican	Vaneta Becker (incumbent)	43,371	80.7
Independent	John Woodard	10,367	19.3
Total votes		53,738	100.0
Republican hold			
