= 2020 Indiana Senate election =

- November 3, 2020

25 of the 50 seats in the Indiana Senate 26 seats needed for a majority
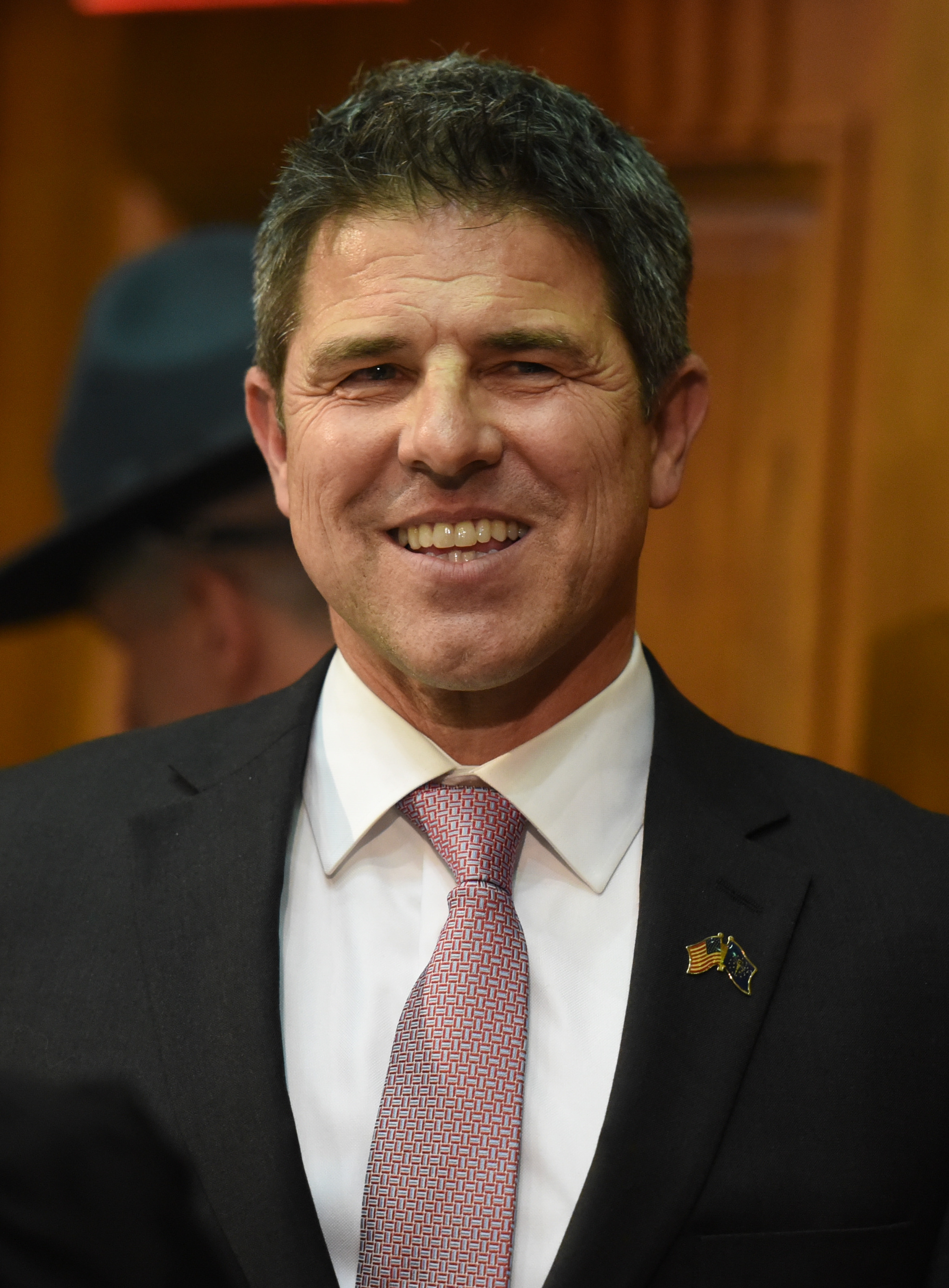

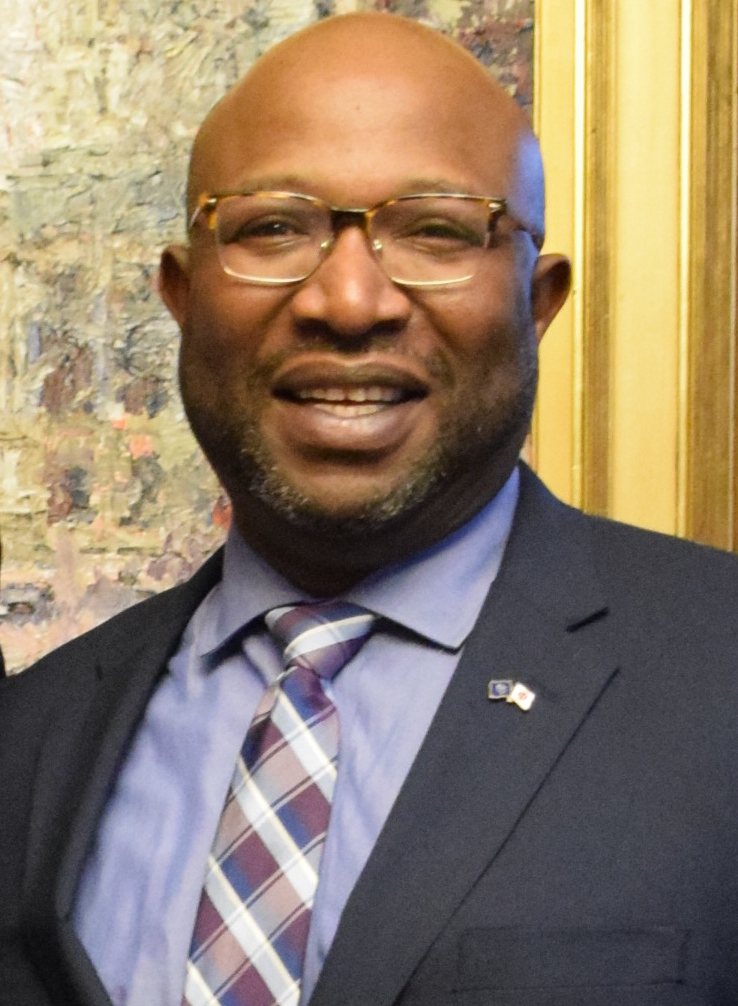
	Majority party	Minority party
Leader	Rodric Bray	Greg Taylor
Party	Republican	Democratic
Leader since	November 20, 2018	November 6, 2020
Leader's seat	37th district	33rd district
Seats before	40	10
Seats won	18	7
Seats after	39	11
Seat change	▼1	▲1
Popular vote	778,292	596,836
Percentage	56.60%	43.40%
- Results of the elections: Democratic gain Democratic hold Republican hold No election
Majority Leader before election
Mark Messmer
Republican
Elected Majority Leader
Mark Messmer
Republican

The 2020 Indiana Senate election was held on November 3, 2020, as a part of the biennial elections in the U.S. state of Indiana, coinciding with other elections in the state, including for U.S. president, U.S. House, Indiana governor, and Indiana House, as well as various other state and local elections. Voters elected members to 25 of the 50 seats in the Indiana Senate to serve four-year terms in single-member constituencies. Primary elections were held on June 2.

Following the election, the Republican Party retained supermajority control of the Senate, losing one seat to the Democratic Party in the process.

== Incumbents defeated ==
One incumbent lost re-election.

1. District 30: John Ruckelshaus (R) lost to Fady Qaddoura (D).

== Predictions ==
Source	Ranking	As of
The Cook Political Report	Safe R	October 21, 2020

== Results ==
=== Overview ===
2020 Indiana State Senate general election
Party	Votes	Percentage	% change	Seats Before	Seats Up	Candidates	Seats Won	Seats After	+/–
Republican	778,292	56.60%	▼11.00%	40	19	19	18	39	▼1
Democratic	596,836	43.40%	▲11.00%	10	6	22	7	11	▲1
Totals	1,375,128	100.00%	—	50	25	41	25	50	Steady
Source: Indiana Election Division

Popular vote
Republican	56.60%
Democratic	43.40%

Senate seats (Note: Excludes seats not up for election.)
Republican	72.00%
Democratic	28.00%

=== District 2 ===
District 2 election
Party	Candidate	Votes	%
Democratic	Lonnie Randolph (incumbent)	31,810	100.00
Total votes		31,810	100.00
Democratic hold			

=== District 3 ===
District 3 election
Party	Candidate	Votes	%
Democratic	Eddie Melton (incumbent)	38,445	100.00
Total votes		38,445	100.00
Democratic hold			

=== District 5 ===
District 5 election
Party	Candidate	Votes	%
Republican	Ed Charbonneau (incumbent)	43,664	65.76
Democratic	Luke Bohm	22,740	34.24
Total votes		66,404	100.00
Republican hold			

=== District 7 ===
Republican primary
Party	Candidate	Votes	%
Republican	Brian Buchanan (incumbent)	9,597	69.40
Republican	Ethan Brown	3,651	26.40
Republican	Vernon Budde	581	4.20
Total votes		13,829	100.00

District 7 election
Party	Candidate	Votes	%
Republican	Brian Buchanan (incumbent)	39,566	69.47
Democratic	Tabitha N. Bartley	17,385	30.53
Total votes		56,951	100.00
Republican hold			

=== District 8 ===
District 8 election
Party	Candidate	Votes	%
Republican	Mike Bohacek (incumbent)	35,329	59.42
Democratic	Gary Davis	24,132	40.58
Total votes		59,461	100.00
Republican hold			

=== District 9 ===
District 9 election
Party	Candidate	Votes	%
Republican	Ryan Mishler (incumbent)	42,414	74.90
Democratic	Brandon M. Cavanaugh	14,216	25.10
Total votes		56,630	100.00
Republican hold			

=== District 10 ===
Democratic primary
Party	Candidate	Votes	%
Democratic	David L. Niezgodski (incumbent)	7,785	63.56
Democratic	Alex Bowman	4,463	36.44
Total votes		12,248	100.00

District 10 election
Party	Candidate	Votes	%
Democratic	David L. Niezgodski (incumbent)	31,706	100.00
Total votes		31,706	100.00
Democratic hold			

=== District 12 ===
District 12 election
Party	Candidate	Votes	%
Republican	Blake Doriot (incumbent)	32,751	68.54
Democratic	Charles Mumaw	15,030	31.46
Total votes		47,781	100.00
Republican hold			

=== District 13 ===
Republican primary
Party	Candidate	Votes	%
Republican	Sue Glick (incumbent)	8,015	61.17
Republican	Jeffrey W. Wible	5,088	38.83
Total votes		13,103	100.00

District 13 election
Party	Candidate	Votes	%
Republican	Sue Glick (incumbent)	41,701	100.00
Total votes		41,701	100.00
Republican hold			

=== District 16 ===
Republican primary
Party	Candidate	Votes	%
Republican	Justin Busch (incumbent)	7,796	69.05
Republican	Tom Rhoades	3,495	30.95
Total votes		11,291	100.00

Democratic primary
Party	Candidate	Votes	%
Democratic	Juli Dominguez	5,075	52.14
Democratic	Tim Barr	4,659	47.86
Total votes		9,734	100.00

District 16 election
Party	Candidate	Votes	%
Republican	Justin Busch (incumbent)	35,382	57.86
Democratic	Juli Dominguez	25,767	42.14
Total votes		61,149	100.00
Republican hold			

=== District 18 ===
District 18 election
Party	Candidate	Votes	%
Republican	Stacey Donato (incumbent)	38,223	73.25
Democratic	Laura Fred-Smith	13,961	26.75
Total votes		52,184	100.00
Republican hold			

=== District 20 ===
Republican primary
Party	Candidate	Votes	%
Republican	Scott Baldwin	14,072	68.17
Republican	John Gaylor	6,573	31.84
Total votes		20,645	100.00

District 20 election
Party	Candidate	Votes	%
Republican	Scott Baldwin	56,629	62.48
Democratic	Ronnie Saunders	34,004	37.52
Total votes		90,633	100.00
Republican hold			

=== District 24 ===
District 24 election
Party	Candidate	Votes	%
Republican	John Crane (incumbent)	50,755	65.54
Democratic	Stan Albaugh	26,681	34.46
Total votes		77,436	100.00
Republican hold			

=== District 28 ===
District 28 election
Party	Candidate	Votes	%
Republican	Michael Crider (incumbent)	42,582	62.61
Democratic	Theresa Bruno	25,434	37.39
Total votes		68,016	100.00
Republican hold			

=== District 30 ===
Republican primary
Party	Candidate	Votes	%
Republican	John Ruckelshaus (incumbent)	9,209	80.81
Republican	Terry Michael	2,187	19.19
Total votes		11,396	100.00

District 30 election
Party	Candidate	Votes	%
Democratic	Fady Qaddoura	42,268	52.56
Republican	John Ruckelshaus (incumbent)	38,145	47.44
Total votes		80,413	100.00
Democratic gain from Republican			

=== District 32 ===
District 32 election
Party	Candidate	Votes	%
Republican	Aaron Freeman (incumbent)	35,517	58.99
Democratic	Belinda Drake	24,688	41.01
Total votes		60,205	100.00
Republican hold			

=== District 33 ===
District 33 election
Party	Candidate	Votes	%
Democratic	Greg Taylor (incumbent)	47,027	100.00
Total votes		47,027	100.00
Democratic hold			

=== District 34 ===
District 34 election
Party	Candidate	Votes	%
Democratic	Jean Breaux (incumbent)	43,340	100.00
Total votes		43,340	100.00
Democratic hold			

=== District 35 ===
District 35 election
Party	Candidate	Votes	%
Republican	R. Michael Young (incumbent)	29,557	57.95
Democratic	Pete Cowden	21,446	42.05
Total votes		51,003	100.00
Republican hold			

=== District 36 ===
Democratic primary
Party	Candidate	Votes	%
Democratic	Ashley Eason	6,339	73.40
Democratic	Jason E. Fletcher	2,297	26.60
Total votes		8,636	100.00

District 36 election
Party	Candidate	Votes	%
Republican	Jack Sandlin (incumbent)	27,601	53.87
Democratic	Ashley Eason	23,633	46.13
Total votes		51,234	100.00
Republican hold			

=== District 37 ===
District 37 election
Party	Candidate	Votes	%
Republican	Rodric Bray (incumbent)	52,044	77.14
Democratic	Tom Wallace	15,423	22.86
Total votes		67,467	100.00
Republican hold			

=== District 40 ===
Democratic primary
Party	Candidate	Votes	%
Democratic	Shelli Yoder	14,809	81.05
Democratic	John Zody	3,025	16.56
Democratic	Trent Feuerbach	437	2.39
Total votes		18,271	100.00

District 40 election
Party	Candidate	Votes	%
Democratic	Shelli Yoder	41,433	100.00
Total votes		41,433	100.00
Democratic hold			

=== District 42 ===
District 42 election
Party	Candidate	Votes	%
Republican	Jean Leising (incumbent)	47,463	100.00
Total votes		47,463	100.00
Republican hold			

=== District 44 ===
District 44 election
Party	Candidate	Votes	%
Republican	Eric Koch (incumbent)	43,907	72.97
Democratic	Cinde Wirth	16,267	27.03
Total votes		60,174	100.00
Republican hold			

=== District 50 ===
District 50 election
Party	Candidate	Votes	%
Republican	Vaneta Becker (incumbent)	45,062	100.00
Total votes		45,062	100.00
Republican hold			

== See also ==
- 2020 Indiana elections
- 2020 Indiana House of Representatives election
