= 2016 Indiana Senate election =

- November 8, 2016

25 out of 50 seats in the Indiana Senate 26 seats needed for a majority

	Majority party	Minority party
Leader	Brandt Hershman	Timothy Lanane
Party	Republican	Democratic
Leader since	April 30, 2012	November 5, 2008
Leader's seat	District 7	District 25
Last election	40	10
Seats won	19	6
Seats after	41	9
Seat change	▲1	▼1
Popular vote	704,633	490,406
Percentage	57.41%	39.95%
President pro tempore before election
David C. Long
Republican
Elected President pro tempore
David C. Long
Republican

The 2016 Indiana Senate election was held on November 8, 2016, to determine which party would control the Indiana Senate for the following two years in the 120th Indiana General Assembly. Twentyfive out of 50 seats in the Indiana Senate were up for election and the primary was held on May 3, 2016. Prior to the election, 40 seats were held by Republicans and 10 seats were held by Democrats. The general election saw Republicans expanding their majority in the State Senate by a single seat.

== Predictions ==
Source	Ranking	As of
Governing	Safe R	October 12, 2016

== Retirements ==
=== Democrats ===
1. District 3: Earline S. Rogers retired.
2. District 8: Jim Arnold retired.
3. District 10: John Broden retired.

=== Republicans ===
1. District 12: Carlin Yoder retired.
2. District 30: Scott Schneider retired.
3. District 32: Patricia L. Miller retired.
4. District 36: Brent Waltz retired.
5. District 44: Brent Steele retired.

== Closest races ==
Seats where the margin of victory was under 10%:

1. District 30, 4.99%

== Results ==
=== District 2 ===
District 2 election, 2016
Party	Candidate	Votes	%
Democratic	Lonnie Randolph (incumbent)	33,460	100.0%
Total votes		33,460	100.0%
Democratic hold			

=== District 3 ===
District 3 election, 2016
Party	Candidate	Votes	%
Democratic	Eddie Melton	40,457	100.0%
Total votes		40,457	100.0%
Democratic hold			

=== District 5 ===
District 5 election, 2016
Party	Candidate	Votes	%
Republican	Ed Charbonneau (incumbent)	34,771	59.85%
Democratic	Jim Harper	23,328	40.15%
Total votes		58,099	100.0%
Republican hold			

=== District 7 ===
District 7 election, 2016
Party	Candidate	Votes	%
Republican	Brandt Hershman (incumbent)	36,158	71.25%
Democratic	Justin Notoras	14,590	28.75%
Total votes		50,748	100.0%
Republican hold			

=== District 8 ===
District 8 election, 2016
Party	Candidate	Votes	%
Republican	Mike Bohacek	31,239	58.27%
Democratic	Maxine Spenner	22,373	41.73%
Total votes		53,612	100.0%
Republican gain from Democratic			

=== District 9 ===
District 9 election, 2016
Party	Candidate	Votes	%
Republican	Ryan Mishler (incumbent)	41,794	100.0%
Total votes		41,794	100.0%
Republican hold			

=== District 10 ===
District 10 election, 2016
Party	Candidate	Votes	%
Democratic	David L. Niezgodski	31,011	82.96%
Libertarian	Gerard Arthus	6,370	17.04%
Total votes		37,381	100.0%
Democratic hold			

=== District 12 ===
District 12 election, 2016
Party	Candidate	Votes	%
Republican	Blake Doriot	29,301	70.14%
Democratic	Carl Rust	12,476	29.86%
Total votes		41,777	100.0%
Republican hold			

=== District 13 ===
District 13 election, 2016
Party	Candidate	Votes	%
Republican	Sue Glick (incumbent)	33,720	75.62%
Democratic	Justin Kuhnle	10,872	24.38%
Total votes		44,592	100.0%
Republican hold			

=== District 16 ===
District 16 election, 2016
Party	Candidate	Votes	%
Republican	David C. Long (incumbent)	35,243	66.06%
Democratic	Juli Dominguez	18,110	33.94%
Total votes		53,353	100.0%
Republican hold			

=== District 18 ===
District 18 election, 2016
Party	Candidate	Votes	%
Republican	Randy Head (incumbent)	39,036	100.0%
Total votes		39,036	100.0%
Republican hold			

=== District 20 ===
District 20 election, 2016
Party	Candidate	Votes	%
Republican	Luke Kenley (incumbent)	48,651	68.44%
Democratic	Paula Gilliam	19,043	26.79%
Libertarian	Donald Rainwater	3,392	4.77%
Total votes		71,086	100.0%
Republican hold			

=== District 24 ===
District 24 election, 2016
Party	Candidate	Votes	%
Republican	John Crane	47,493	81.62%
Libertarian	Kevin Rogers	10,694	18.38%
Total votes		58,187	100.0%
Republican hold			

=== District 28 ===
District 28 election, 2016
Party	Candidate	Votes	%
Republican	Michael Crider (incumbent)	38,404	64.46%
Democratic	Ken Kern	21,166	35.53%
Independent	Jerry Coverstone	6	0.01%
Total votes		59,576	100.0%
Republican hold			

=== District 30 ===
District 30 election, 2016
Party	Candidate	Votes	%
Republican	John Ruckelshaus	36,848	50.73%
Democratic	Pamela Hickman	33,220	45.74%
Libertarian	Zach Roberts	2,564	3.53%
Total votes		72,632	100.0%
Republican hold			

=== District 32 ===
District 32 election, 2016
Party	Candidate	Votes	%
Republican	Aaron Freeman	31,187	58.99%
Democratic	Sara Wiley	20,202	37.03%
Libertarian	Shane Zoellner	2,172	3.98%
Total votes		54,561	100.0%
Republican hold			

=== District 33 ===
District 33 election, 2016
Party	Candidate	Votes	%
Democratic	Greg Taylor (incumbent)	42,544	89.16%
Libertarian	Jacob Leddy	5,170	10.84%
Total votes		47,714	100.0%
Democratic hold			

=== District 34 ===
District 34 election, 2016
Party	Candidate	Votes	%
Democratic	Jean Breaux (incumbent)	41,369	100.0%
Total votes		41,369	100.0%
Democratic hold			

=== District 35 ===
District 35 election, 2016
Party	Candidate	Votes	%
Republican	R. Michael Young (incumbent)	26,631	58.81%
Democratic	Phil Webster	18,655	41.19%
Total votes		45,286	100.0%
Republican hold			

=== District 36 ===
District 36 election, 2016
Party	Candidate	Votes	%
Republican	Jack Sandlin	26,696	59.23%
Democratic	Sean Gorman	18,375	40.77%
Total votes		45,071	100.0%
Republican hold			

=== District 37 ===
District 37 election, 2016
Party	Candidate	Votes	%
Republican	Rodric Bray (incumbent)	48,329	100.0%
Total votes		48,329	100.0%
Republican hold			

=== District 40 ===
District 40 election, 2016
Party	Candidate	Votes	%
Democratic	Mark Stoops (incumbent)	39,664	100.0%
Total votes		39,664	100.0%
Democratic hold			

=== District 42 ===
District 42 election, 2016
Party	Candidate	Votes	%
Republican	Jean Leising (incumbent)	37,843	72.88%
Democratic	Randy Howard	14,085	27.12%
Total votes		51,928	100.0%
Republican hold			

=== District 44 ===
District 44 election, 2016
Party	Candidate	Votes	%
Republican	Eric Koch	36,875	67.89%
Democratic	Linda Henderson	15,406	28.37%
Libertarian	Darin Kinser	2,029	3.74%
Total votes		54,310	100.0%
Republican hold			

=== District 50 ===
District 50 election, 2016
Party	Candidate	Votes	%
Republican	Vaneta Becker (incumbent)	44,504	100.0%
Total votes		44,504	100.0%
Republican hold			
