= Senator Glick =

Senator Glick may refer to:

- George Washington Glick (1827–1911), Kansas State Senate
- Sue Glick (born 1950/51), Indiana State Senate
