= David Vinzant =

American politician

Member of the Indiana Senate from the 3rd district
- In office January 8, 2024 – November 19, 2024
- Preceded by: Eddie Melton
- Succeeded by: Mark Spencer

Personal details
- Party: Democratic
- Education: Purdue University (BS)

David Vinzant is an American politician who served as a member of the Indiana Senate for the 3rd district in 2024.

== Early life and education ==
Vinzant was born in Hobart, Indiana. He attended Hobart High School and completed a Bachelor of Science degree in general management, specializing in accounting and finance, at Purdue University.

== Career ==
Vinzant ran unsuccessfully in the 2012 Democratic primaries for the 3rd Senate district, but lost to incumbent Earline S. Rogers. In 2023, a Democratic precinct caucus chose Vinzant to replace incumbent Eddie Melton, who had resigned from the Senate following his election as mayor of Gary, and serve out the remaining eleven months of Melton's term. He had also previously served as local councilmember on the Hobart City Council. Vinzant ran for a full term in 2024, however, he lost in the Democratic primary to Gary city councilor, Mark Spencer.

== Personal life ==
Vinzant is married and has two step-children.
