= Veronica Pejril =

American politician

Member of the Greencastle Common Council from the 3rd Ward
- In office January 1, 2020 – January 1, 2024
- Preceded by: Steve Fields
- Succeeded by: Tina Nicholson

Personal details
- Party: Democratic
- Education: Princeton University (MFA)

Veronica Pejril is an American politician from Greencastle, Indiana. She served as a Greencastle City Council member from 2020 to 2024, making her the first openly transgender elected official in the state of Indiana. She was the democratic candidate for District 24 in the 2024 Indiana Senate election. If elected, she would have become the state's first openly transgender state lawmaker.

== Education ==
Pejril studied music composition at the University of Illinois. As a student, she developed software tools for musicians and received a doctoral fellowship to Princeton University. She received a Master of Fine Arts degree and is an assistant professor at Depauw University.

== Political career ==
During her election campaign, Pejril experienced transphobic harassment by fellow city council candidate Haywood Ware. Pejril denounced the behavior as well as separate Islamophobic posts. These statements were denounced by other council candidates, and the state Democratic chairman encouraged Eric Holcomb to do the same. Pejril entered office on January 1, 2020, and became the first openly transgender elected official in the state of Indiana. In 2022, she was one of many public officials to speak out against the Alliance Defending Freedom for supporting the passage of an anti-trans sports ban. She lost her reelection in 2023 to Tina Nicholson.

Pejril serves as secretary for the Putnam County Democratic Party. She was a delegate to the 2020 Democratic National Convention and the 2024 Democratic National Convention. She is on the board of directors for Indiana Youth Group.

Pejril announced her candidacy for District 24 of the 2024 Indiana Senate election in January 2024. She campaigned alongside Valerie McCray, Derrick Holder, and Dave Crooks. She campaigned on issues such as transgender healthcare and abortion in Indiana. If elected, she would have become the first openly transgender and second openly LGBT state lawmaker in Indiana.

=== Electoral history ===
Greencastle Common Council, Ward 3, 2019
Party	Candidate	Votes	%	±%
Democratic	Veronica Pejril	167	67.3%	
Republican	Haywood Ware	81	32.7%	
Turnout		248		
Democratic hold		Swing		

Greencastle Common Council, Ward 3, 2023
Party	Candidate	Votes	%	±%
Republican	Tina Nicholson	173	54.1%	
Democratic	Veronica Pejril (incumbent)	147	45.9%	
Turnout		320		
Republican gain from Democratic		Swing		

Indiana Senate District 24, 2024
Party	Candidate	Votes	%	±%
Republican	Brett Clark	49,211	67.2%	
Democratic	Veronica Pejril	24,014	32.8%	
Turnout		73,225		
Republican hold		Swing		

== See also ==
- List of transgender public officeholders in the United States
