= Brian Buchanan (disambiguation) =

Brian Buchanan may refer to:

- Brian Buchanan (born 1973), American baseball player
- Brian Buchanan (cricketer), Jamaican cricketer
- Brian Buchanan (politician), American politician
- Brian Buchanan, band member of Enter the Haggis
- Brian Buchanan (bodybuilder), winner of the 1983 Universe Championships
