= Billie Breaux =

American politician (born 1936)

Member of the Indiana Senate from the 34th district
- In office 1990–2006
- Succeeded by: Jean Breaux

Personal details
- Born: June 23, 1936 (age 90) Indianapolis, Indiana
- Party: Democratic
- Children: Jean Breaux
- Education: West Virginia State College (BS); Indiana University Bloomington (MS)

Billie J. Breaux (born June 23, 1936) is an American politician who served as a member of the Indiana Senate from 1990 to 2006. Representing the 34th district, she was succeeded by her daughter, Jean Breaux. She is a Democrat.

== Early life and education ==
Breaux was born in Indianapolis, Indiana. She earned a Bachelor of Science degree from West Virginia State College and a Master of Science from Indiana University Bloomington.

== Career ==
A teacher, Breaux served as the president of the Indianapolis Education Association. She later became a civil rights activist, and was present when Robert F. Kennedy announced the assassination of Martin Luther King Jr. Breaux was instrumental in the effort to recognize Martin Luther King Jr. Day as a statewide holiday in Indiana. Breaux was elected to the Indiana Senate in 1990, where she was a member of the Indiana Black Legislative Caucus and served as Assistant Majority Whip. She left office in 2006, and was succeeded by her daughter, Jean Breaux.

Breaux later served as the Marion County Auditor.

In 2022, after a dispute over endorsements, Breaux ran an ultimately unsuccessful primary candidacy for Marion County Clerk against Marion County Democratic Party Chair Kate Sweeney Bell. Bell received the endorsement that was disputed.
