= Carlin Yoder =

American politician

Member of the Indiana Senate from the 12th district
- In office 2008–2016
- Preceded by: Marvin D. Riegsecker
- Succeeded by: Blake Doriot

Personal details
- Party: Republican
- Spouse: Jayme
- Education: Indiana University South Bend

Carlin Yoder is an American politician who served as a member of the Indiana Senate for the 12th district from 2008 to 2016.

== Education ==
Yoder is a graduate of Indiana University South Bend.

== Senate ==
Yoder represented the 12th district in the Indiana Senate from 2008 to 2016. During his tenure, he served as assistant majority caucus chair. The 12th district includes Elkhart county. He won election to the senate in 2008, receiving 27,496 votes while Democrat Donald Metzler-Smith received 16,569 votes. In 2012, he received 28,933 votes and defeated opponent Jim Ball who received 13,206 votes. Yoder became chairman of the Homeland Security and Transportation Committee and was the ranking member on the Veterans Affairs and the Military Committee. He did not seek a third term.

== Personal life ==
Yoder is married with five children.
