= La Keisha Jackson =

American politician

Member of the Indiana Senate from the 34th district
- Incumbent
- Assumed office April 18, 2024
- Preceded by: Jean Breaux

Member of the Indianapolis City-County Council from the 15th district
- In office 2024–2024
- Preceded by: Jessica McCormick
- Succeeded by: Rena Allen

Member of the Indianapolis City-County Council from the 14th district
- In office 2015–2023
- Preceded by: Marilyn Pfisterer
- Succeeded by: Andy Nielson

Member of the Indianapolis City-County Council from the 18th district
- In office 2014–2015
- Preceded by: Vernon Brown
- Succeeded by: Susie Cordi

Personal details
- Party: Democratic
- Occupation: Businesswomen

La Keisha Jackson is an American politician and member of the Indiana Senate from the 34th district. An Indianapolis City-County Councilor from 2014 to 2024, Jackson is African-American and a member of the Indiana Black Legislative Caucus.

== Indianapolis City-County Council ==
In 2014, Jackson was appointed by the Marion County Democratic Caucus to serve on the Indianapolis City-County Council following Vernon Brown's resignation. In 2015, she successfully ran for election in the 14th district, which she held until the city-county map redistricting ahead of the 2023 election. Jackson subsequently ran and was elected in the 15th district in 2023.

== Indiana Senate ==
On April 18, 2024, Jackson was appointed to the Indiana Senate to fill the seat left vacant by the resignation of Jean Breaux, who died two days later. She subsequently won election to a full term in the 2024 Indiana Senate election.

== Electoral history ==
Indianapolis City-County Council District 14 general election, 2015
Party	Candidate	Votes	%
Democratic	La Keisha Jackson	2,975	80.7%
Republican	Terry Dove	712	19.3%
Total votes		3,687	100.0%
Democratic gain from Republican			

Democratic primary for Indianapolis City-County Council District 14, 2019
Party	Candidate	Votes	%
Democratic	La Keisha Jackson (Incumbent)	1,068	88.2%
Democratic	Rena Allen	143	11.8%
Total votes		1,211	100.0%

Indianapolis City-County Council District 14 general election, 2019
Party	Candidate	Votes	%
Democratic	La Keisha Jackson (Incumbent)	2,958	67.4%
Independent	Derris Ross	988	22.5%
Republican	Karl Kenry	445	10.1%
Total votes		4,391	100.0%
Democratic hold			

Democratic primary for Indianapolis City-County Council District 15, 2023
Party	Candidate	Votes	%
Democratic	La Keisha Jackson (Incumbent)	1,444	100.0%
Total votes		1,444	100.0%

Indianapolis City-County Council District 15 general election, 2023
Party	Candidate	Votes	%
Democratic	La Keisha Jackson (Incumbent)	3,324	100.0%
Total votes		3,324	100.0%
Democratic hold			

Indiana State Senate District 34 general election, 2024
Party	Candidate	Votes	%
Democratic	La Keisha Jackson (Incumbent)	36,165	100.0%
Total votes		36,165	100.0%
Democratic hold			
