= Brent Steele =

American politician

Member of the Indiana Senate from the 44th district
- In office November 3, 2004 – November 9, 2016
- Preceded by: Becky Skillman
- Succeeded by: Eric Koch

Member of the Indiana House of Representatives from the 65th district
- In office November 9, 1994 – November 6, 2002
- Preceded by: Linda Henderson
- Succeeded by: Eric Koch

Personal details
- Born: August 25, 1947 (age 79) Indianapolis, Indiana, U.S.
- Party: Republican
- Spouse: Sally
- Education: Indiana University; Indiana University School of Law
- Occupation: Politician

Brent Steele (born August 25, 1947) is a former Republican member of the Indiana Senate, representing the 44th District from 2004 to 2016. He served in the Indiana House of Representatives from 1995 to 2002 before succeeding Becky Skillman as state senator for the 44th. Steele has supported displaying the Ten Commandments on government property. Steele and his family competed on the game show Family Feud at least twice.
