= Jean Breaux =

American politician (1958–2024)

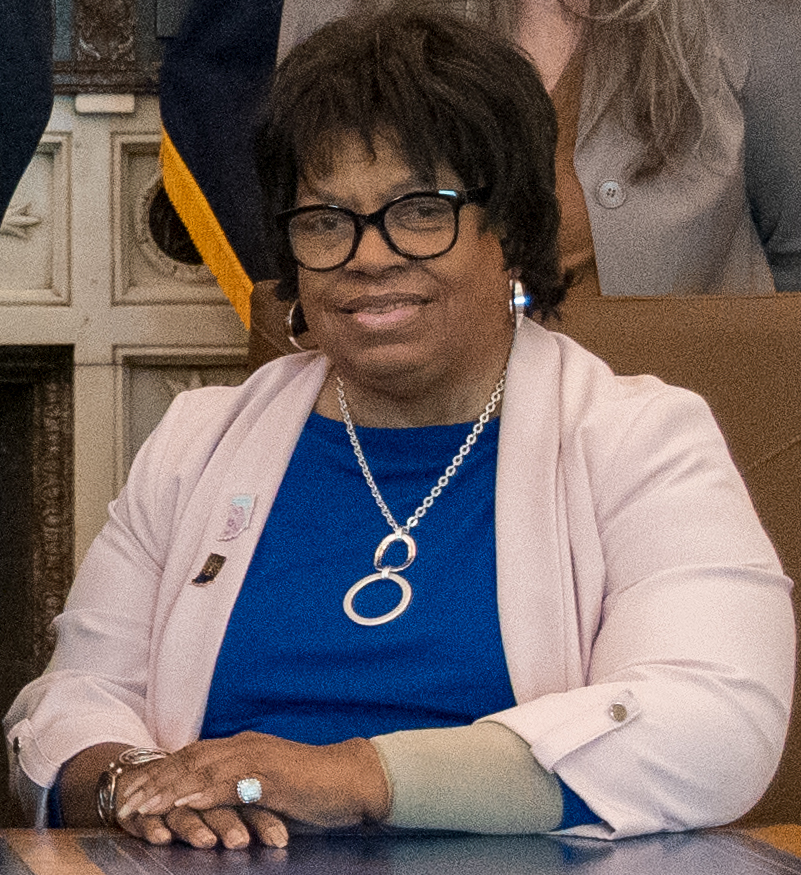
- Breaux in 2023

Member of the Indiana Senate from the 34th district
- In office December 12, 2006 – March 18, 2024
- Preceded by: Billie Breaux
- Succeeded by: La Keisha Jackson

Personal details
- Born: September 11, 1958 Eckman, West Virginia
- Died: March 20, 2024 (aged 65) Indianapolis, Indiana, U.S.
- Party: Democratic
- Education: Indiana Wesleyan University (BA)

Jean Dominique Breaux (September 11, 1958 – March 20, 2024) was an American politician serving as a member of the Indiana Senate from the 34th District. She was appointed to the Senate in December 2006. Breaux was an employee of the Indiana Department of Commerce. She was also employed by the Community Development Corporation and the Forest Manor Multi-Service Center. Breaux was a member of the Indiana Black Legislative Caucus.

Breaux died on March 20, 2024, at the age of 65.
