= Indiana Black Legislative Caucus =

American political organization

The Indiana Black Legislative Caucus is an American political organization composed of African Americans elected to the Indiana General Assembly.

== Role ==
By drafting and sponsoring legislation to address constituent needs and by examining all bills that affect the minority populace, the Caucus acts as a legislative body on behalf of the minority community. The Caucus presents a minority perspective from the entire state to the Legislature and advocates public policies that promote minority social, cultural and economic progress, statewide. In addition, the Caucus serves as a research study group to generate pertinent data in support of appropriate public policies.

== Current membership ==
List of officers:

District	Officers	Position
2 (House)	Earl Harris Jr.	Chairman
1 (House)	Carolyn Jackson	Vice Chair
34 (Senate)	La Keisha Jackson	Treasurer
95 (House)	John L. Bartlett	Parliamentarian
77 (House)	Alex Burton	Chaplain
3 (House)	Ragen Hatcher	
46 (Senate)	Andrea Hunley	
92 (House)	Renee Pack	
96 (House)	Greg Porter	
94 (House)	Cherrish Pryor	
2 (Senate)	Lonnie Randolph	
98 (House)	Robin Shackleford	
14 (House)	Vernon Smith	
3 (Senate)	Mark Spencer	
99 (House)	Vanessa Summers	
33 (Senate)	Greg Taylor	

== History ==
The first African-American man elected to the Indiana House of Representatives was James Sidney Hinton in 1880. A few other African-American members, James Townsend, Richard Bassett and Gabriel Jones were elected in the late 19th century (all of whom, like Hinton, were Republicans), and after Jones' retirement in 1897, no African-Americans were elected again to the General Assembly until 1933, when Robert Stanton was elected as the first African-American Democrat in the House in 1933, and African-Americans have been present in the General Assembly ever since. In 1940, Robert Brokenburr, a Republican, became the first African-American State Senator. Daisy Riley Lloyd became the first African-American woman in the House in 1965, and Julia Carson and Katie Hall became the first in the Senate in 1977. In 1979, the Indiana Black Legislative Caucus was established.
