= Cyndi Carrasco =

American politician

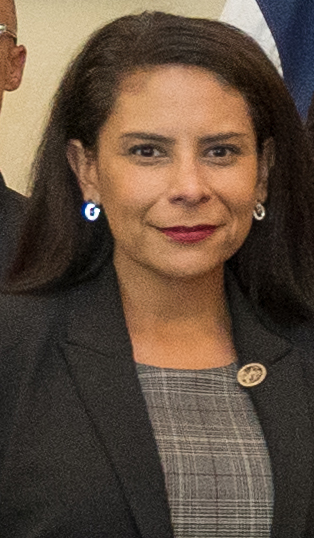

Member of the Indiana Senate from the 36th district
- Incumbent
- Assumed office November 1, 2023
- Preceded by: Jack Sandlin

Personal details
- Party: Republican
- Education: University of Texas at El Paso (BS); Indiana University–Purdue University Indianapolis (JD)

Cyndi Carrasco is an American politician serving as a member of the Indiana Senate from the 36th district. She assumed office on November 1, 2023.

== Career ==
Carrasco earned a bachelor's degree from the University of Texas at El Paso in political science and a Juris Doctor from Indiana University Robert H. McKinney School of Law. In 2015, Governor Mike Pence chose Carrasco to become Inspector General of Indiana. In 2022, Carrasco ran for the office of Marion County prosecutor against incumbent Ryan Mears. She was defeated by Mears in the general election 59.1% to 40.9%. On July 10, 2023, Carrasco became the vice president and general counsel of the University of Indianapolis. After Senator Jack Sandlin unexpectedly died in September 2023, Carrasco defeated former state representative John Jacob via caucus with a vote of 53–5.

== Personal life ==
Carrasco and her husband, Robert, live in Indianapolis. They have a daughter named Sarah.

She is Hispanic.
