= Brett Clark (politician) =

American politician

Member of the Indiana Senate from the 24th district
- Incumbent
- Assumed office November 6, 2024
- Preceded by: John Crane

Personal details
- Party: Republican
- Website: https://www.clarkforstatesenate.com/

Brett A. Clark is an American law enforcement officer, politician, and member of the Indiana Senate from the 24th district. He attended Purdue University and served in the US Navy. Clark started his career with the Hendricks County Sheriff's Office in 1989.
