= Mark Spencer (Indiana politician) =

American politician

Member of the Indiana Senate from the 3rd district
- Incumbent
- Assumed office November 6, 2024
- Preceded by: David Vinzant

Personal details
- Party: Democratic Party
- Website: https://spencerforsenator.com/

Mark Spencer is an American politician and member of the Indiana Senate from the 3rd district. He is African-American. He is a member of the Indiana Black Legislative Caucus.
