= Stacey Donato =

American politician

Member of the Indiana Senate from the 18th district
- Incumbent
- Assumed office September 11, 2019
- Preceded by: Randy Head

Personal details
- Born: Stacey Ann Collins
- Party: Republican
- Spouse: Jim Donato
- Children: 2
- Education: Ivy Tech Community College of Indiana

Stacey Ann Donato is an American politician serving as a member of the Indiana Senate from the 18th district. She assumed office on September 11, 2019.

== Education ==
Donato studied accounting at the Ivy Tech Community College of Indiana.

== Career ==
Outside of politics, Donato has worked as an accountant and office manager for car dealerships. She was also a member of the Cass County Council, Indiana Farm Bureau, and Grissom Air Force Reserve Base Community Council, and other organizations. She was appointed to the Indiana Senate in September 2019, succeeding Randall Head.
