= Scott Baldwin (politician) =

American politician, businessman, and law enforcement officer

Member of the Indiana Senate from the 20th district
- Incumbent
- Assumed office November 18, 2020
- Preceded by: Victoria Spartz

Personal details
- Born: Noblesville, Indiana, U.S.
- Party: Republican
- Children: 3

Military service
- Allegiance: United States
- Branch/service: United States Marine Corps; United States Army Reserve

Scott Baldwin is an American politician, businessman, and law enforcement officer. A Republican, he represents District 20 in the Indiana Senate. He assumed office on November 18, 2020, succeeding Victoria Spartz. He owns a real estate development and construction management company, Envoy, Inc., as well as a real estate brokerage, IT company and a big game outfitting company. Baldwin founded a nonprofit company called Darkhorse Expeditions to provide awareness and prevention efforts for Veteran PTSD and suicide.

== Early life and education ==
Baldwin is a native of Noblesville, Indiana, and graduated from Madison Heights High School in Anderson, Indiana. After graduating from high school, Baldwin enlisted in the United States Marine Corps.

== Career ==
In addition to serving in the Marine Corps, Baldwin worked as an officer in the Indianapolis Metropolitan Police Department and as a corrections officer for the Indiana Department of Correction. Baldwin also served in the United States Army Reserve. Since retiring from law enforcement, Baldwin has operated IT, real estate, construction, and private security companies. Baldwin has served on the Riverview Hospital Board of Trustees, the Hamilton County (Indiana) Health Board, the Hamilton County (Indiana) Redevelopment Commission, the Food Rescue Board of Directors, and the Crime Stoppers Board of Directors.

In 2011 and 2012, Baldwin embedded with USMC infantry unit (CONUS & OCONUS) as a law enforcement subject matter expert to advise commanders and staff on the collection, integration, analysis, and dissemination of information pertaining to criminal terrorist networks and the local dynamics of criminal radicalization. He assisted Marine Corps personnel in identification and apprehension of high value, anti-coalition elements and narco-terrorists, forensic support, and case preparation.

On January 13, 2020, before incumbent senator Victoria Spartz declared her candidacy for the United States House of Representatives on February 5, 2020, Baldwin entered the race to challenge her. He defeated John Gaylor in the Republican primary and Democratic nominee Ronald Saunders III in the November general election.

In early 2021, Baldwin sponsored Indiana House Bill 1314, which allows title companies and individuals to invalidate discriminatory covenants such as those preventing certain races from owning real estate.

In late 2021, Baldwin was listed as an "annual member" of the far-right anti-government militia Oath Keepers in a database leak. Baldwin responded by saying that he had never been a member, but did make a $30 donation 11 years prior when the organization purported to be supportive of veterans and the 2nd Amendment.

In 2024, Baldwin was named legislator of the year by the Indiana Banking Association.

== Personal life ==
Baldwin has three children. They live in Noblesville, Indiana.
