= Abortion in Indiana =

As of 2024, abortion is generally illegal in Indiana. It is only legal in cases involving fatal fetal abnormalities, to preserve the life and physical health of the mother, and in cases of rape or incest up to 10 weeks of pregnancy. Previously abortion in Indiana was legal up to 20 weeks; a near-total ban that was scheduled to take effect on August 1, 2023, was placed on hold due to further legal challenges, but is set to take place, after the Indiana Supreme Court denied an appeal by the ACLU, and once it certifies a previous ruling that an abortion ban doesn't violate the state constitution. In the wake of the 2022 Dobbs Supreme Court ruling, abortion in Indiana remained legal despite Indiana lawmakers voting in favor of a near-total abortion ban on August 5, 2022. Governor Eric Holcomb signed this bill into law the same day. The new law became effective on September 15, 2022. However, on September 22, 2022, Special Judge Kelsey B. Hanlon of the Monroe County Circuit Court granted a preliminary injunction against the enforcement of the ban. Her ruling allows the state's previous abortion law, which allows abortions up to 20 weeks after fertilization with exceptions for rape and incest, to remain in effect.

On January 19, 2023, the Indiana Supreme Court heard oral arguments regarding whether the state's ban on abortion violates the state constitution. Following the hearing, Chief Justice Loretta Rush stated that an opinion on the arguments would be issued "in due course" without a clear timeline of when that would be published.

On April 4, 2024, an Indiana appellate court ruled in favor of a group of plaintiffs who challenged the state's abortion ban on the grounds that it violated their religious beliefs under the state's Religious Freedom Restoration Act. On December 10, 2024, the Indiana Supreme Court denied a petition to transfer the case from the appeals court and sent the case back to the trial judge to decide the case on the merits. On March 5, 2026, a Marion County Superior Court judge granted a permanent injunction preventing Indiana from enforcing its near-total abortion ban against women whose religious beliefs necessitate the procedure.

== History ==
=== Legal history ===
==== Early history ====
By the end of the 1800s, all states in the Union except Louisiana had therapeutic exceptions in their legislative bans on abortions. In the 19th century, bans by state legislatures on abortion were about protecting the life of the mother given the number of deaths caused by abortions; state governments saw themselves as looking out for the lives of their citizens. The late 1800s saw various court cases concerning the state of abortion, with most focused on the providers rather than the young women impacted. One case that gained nationwide notice was that of Eliza Francis Levesay, a young woman from a poor family in Decatur County, Indiana, located southeast of the state capitol, Indianapolis. Levesay had an affair with a young man from a wealthy family named William Miers, which resulted in her becoming pregnant and seeking an abortion. Levesay obtained an illegal abortion at the office of Dr. C. C. Burns, a local dentist. After the procedure, Levesay became ill and was treated by a physician, who reported her case to the state authorities. A thorough investigation was conducted into her case; however, the jury was unable to reach a unanimous decision, and the case was dismissed.

By 1950, the state legislature would pass a law that stating that a woman who had an abortion or actively sought to have an abortion, regardless of whether or not she went through with it, was guilty of a criminal offense.

==== 1960s reforms ====
In the late 1960s, Indiana saw various reforms to the anti-abortion laws of the 1950s, which previously made it “a crime at common law to wilfully solicit and/or procure a miscarriage” or to “wilfully terminate a pregnancy except by the operation of nature.” By 1967, no state had fully legalized abortion, but many states had begun the process of reforming laws in favor of protecting the pregnant woman if it was determined that her life would be endangered through the continuation of the pregnancy.

Indiana somewhat relaxed its laws regarding the termination of pregnancies in the 1960s to follow what other states had done in regard to legalizing abortions to save the life of the mother. Some states also permitted abortions "to save the life of the child." It is believed that such a provision was "meant to cover situations where the continuance of the pregnancy would be certain to result in the death of the [fetus] and the [fetus] has developed sufficiently to survive independently if it is taken from the mother by appropriate medical procedures." Due to developments in medical science, physicians and other advanced practitioners could predict with some accuracy whether children would be born with serious physical or mental defects that would significantly impact the child's survivability and quality of life. Medical professionals were aware of the potential for significant birth defects associated with the use of thalidomide or Rubella during pregnancy, both of which were known to cause serious physical deformities. Similar provisions were later added to the laws and are present in the current Indiana abortion laws, which allow an exception for delayed termination of pregnancy when a lethal fetal anomaly is detected, which would result in a reasonable certainty of death within three months after birth.

Indiana did not have specific statutes or judicial decisions to support the right to abortion for medical necessity of either the mother or the fetus at this time; however, legal precedent did exist in which judges had accepted suicidal tendencies as grounds for abortion in cases where the continuation of a pregnancy would present a significant threat to the woman's mental health.

In a statement drafted by Robert Force, an assistant professor of law at Indiana University School of Law in Indianapolis, and Irving Rosenbaum Jr., a physician, in 1967, recommendations for proposed changes to the laws in Indiana called for the protection of both the mental and physical health of the pregnant woman in accordance with a physician's assessment of all factors related to the woman's prognosis if not permitted a legal abortion given the alternative options of seeking an illegal abortion. In their arguments, Force and Rosenbaum argued in favor of considering the woman's situation as a whole, much as would be done with any other patient, as opposed to looking only at the woman's body or specific socioeconomic factors when deciding whether or not an abortion would be appropriate to protect the mother's health. Their proposed amendments called for abortion to be permitted in cases of rape or incest as well as for women who they described as “mentally defective” because they were considered to be victims either of circumstances or of crimes and, therefore, should not be required to maintain the “involuntary” pregnancy.

==== 2000s developments ====
The state passed a law in the 2000s banning abortions after 22 weeks based on the theory that this is the point in development after which the fetus can feel pain. The state was one of ten states in 2007 to have a customary informed consent provision for abortions.

During the 2010s, Indiana passed 14 bills restricting abortion. Of the eight that were able to be put into effect, further restricting the ability of facilities to perform abortions. Between 2010 and 2019, 10 clinics that provided abortion had closed, bringing the facility density from 7.7 to 5.4.

In 2011, the state was one of six where the legislature introduced a bill that would have banned abortion in almost all cases. It did not pass. In 2013, state Targeted Regulation of Abortion Providers (TRAP) had provisions related to admitting privileges and licensing. They required clinics have hospital privileges or some similar agreement.

The state legislature passed the "Sex Selective and Disability Abortion Ban" in 2016. The bill banned abortions based solely on the fetus's gender, race, ethnicity or detected disability, holding the doctors that perform them liable, and requiring women undergoing abortions to be notified of this 18 hours before the operation. The bill also demanded that aborted fetus be treated as deceased humans, requiring clinics to bury or incinerate the bodies if the woman did not take control of this. The bill was set to go into effect in July 2016, but courts enjoined a permanent injunction against the bill's provisions on the basis these violation the right to an abortion established by Roe v. Wade. The challenge to the injunctions reached the Supreme Court of the United States by May 2019, where the Court's per curiam decision in Box v. Planned Parenthood of Indiana and Kentucky, Inc. reversed the injunction on the fetal disposal aspect, stating that had no impact on a woman's right to an abortion. The Supreme Court did not rule on any merits of the non-discriminator clauses, leaving the permanent injunction in place.

In 2018, the state was one of eleven where the legislature introduced a bill that would have banned abortion in almost all cases but were unsuccessful in passing it. Nationally, 2019 was one of the most active years for state legislatures in terms of trying to pass abortion rights restrictions. State governments with Republican majorities started to push these bills after Brett M. Kavanaugh was confirmed as a US Supreme Court judge, replacing the more liberal Anthony Kennedy. These state governments generally saw this as a sign that new moves to restrict abortion rights would less likely face resistance by the courts. The Indiana Legislature passed a ban of the most common type of second-trimester abortion procedure in the state in April 2019. As of mid-May 2019, state law banned abortion after week 22.

==== 2020s developments ====
A 2021 Indiana law requires an ultrasound 18 hours or more before an abortion.

The US Supreme Court's decision in 1973's Roe v. Wade ruling meant the state could no longer regulate abortion in the first trimester. However, in 2022, the Supreme Court overturned Roe v. Wade in Dobbs v. Jackson Women's Health Organization, No. 19-1392, 597 U.S. 215 (2022).

In response, Indiana passed a law known as "Senate Bill 1" (SB1) (authored by Susan Glick, sponsored by Wendy McNamara and Joanne King), which went into effect on September 15, 2022, and banned abortions with exceptions for certain cases of rape, incest, risk to the life of the mother, or fatal fetal anomalies. However, on September 22, 2022, this law was blocked by Special Judge Kelsey B. Hanlon, thus effectively returning the status of legal abortions in Indiana to pre-SB1 conditions. Hearings on the status of SB1 began in January 2023 before the Indiana Supreme Court; however, since no final opinion on the ruling has been published, abortion in Indiana is still legal under the pre-SB1 conditions.

In light of the Dobbs opinion, challenges have also arisen to restrict access to medically induced abortions via the "abortion pills" mifepristone and misoprostol, which are also commonly used in combination to induce miscarriages. Mifepristone (Name Brand: Mifeprex) has been an FDA approved drug since 2000, with the generic product released in 2019, and is the focus of the majority of these challenges. Misoprostol has never been as tightly regulated as mifepristone and is frequently dispensed by retail pharmacies to treat a variety of medical conditions.

On January 3, 2023, the FDA "finalized a rule change that broaden[ed] availability of abortion pills to many more pharmacies, including large chains and mail-order companies." Previously, the drug had only been available for dispensing through specialty offices and clinics. The FDA, as part of mifepristone's Risk Evaluation and Mitigation Strategies (REMS) Program, requires pharmacies to register and become certified prior to dispensing the drug to patients.

On February 1, 2023, it was reported that the attorneys general in 20 conservative-led states, including Indiana, co-signed letters to CVS and Walgreens that they would be subject to legal actions if they dispensed mifepristone within those states, including through mail order services. In early March 2023, Walgreens announced that it would not dispense mifepristone in 21 states, including Indiana, where abortion is either banned or has pending legislation to prevent pharmacists dispensing of the drug. Other major pharmacies including CVS, Rite Aid, and other retail companies with pharmacies remained silent on the issue while insisting they were monitoring the situation.

On April 7, 2023, U.S. District Judge Matthew Kacsmaryk in Amarillo, Texas issued a preliminary injunction in a lawsuit filed by four anti-abortion groups and physicians to ban sales of mifepristone, ruling that "the U.S. Food and Drug Administration had ignored risks in approving the drug." The Biden administration, the Department of Justice, and Danco Laboratories, the distributor of the brand name drug, Mifeprex, argued against this injunction, with President Joe Biden stating, "The Court in this case has substituted its judgment for FDA, the expert agency that approves drugs. If this ruling were to stand, then there will be virtually no prescription, approved by the FDA, that would be safe from these kinds of political, ideological attacks."

On April 21, 2023, the Supreme Court of the United States issued opinion 598 U. S. ____ (2023), which blocked the April 7 decision by Judge Kacsmaryk in a vote of 7–2 with Justices Clarence Thomas and Samuel Alito known to have dissented. The decision from the Supreme Court allows mifepristone to remain legal for use up to 10 weeks gestation in states where abortion is legal, including Indiana. The case will next be heard by the 5th U.S. Circuit Court of Appeals, with oral arguments set to begin on May 17, 2023. Following the decision in the 5th Circuit, the case will likely be heard for a final decision by the Supreme Court in 2024.

On April 4, 2024, an Indiana appellate court ruled in favor of a group of plaintiffs who challenged the state's abortion ban on the grounds that it violated their religious beliefs under the state's Religious Freedom Restoration Act (Indiana) and the trial judge did not abuse his discretion by entering the injunction. On December 10, 2024, the Indiana Supreme Court denied a petition to transfer the case from the appeals court and sent the case back to the trial judge to decide the case on the merits. On March 5, 2026, a Marion County Superior Court judge granted a permanent injunction preventing Indiana from enforcing its near-total abortion ban against women whose religious beliefs necessitate the procedure.

=== Clinical history ===
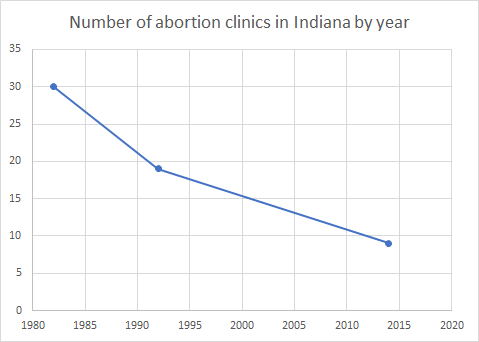
Number of abortion clinics in Indiana by year

Between 1982 and 1992, the number of abortion clinics in the state decreased by eleven, going from 30 in 1982 to 19 in 1992. In 2014, there were nine abortion clinics in the state. In 2014, 95% of the counties in the state did not have an abortion clinic. That year, 66% of women in the state aged 15–44 lived in a county without an abortion clinic. In March 2016, there were 23 Planned Parenthood clinics in the state. In 2017, there were 17 Planned Parenthood clinics, of which 4 offered abortion services, in a state with a population of 1,505,980 women aged 15–49.

For comparison, in 2019, 36% of Indiana's counties had no birth center or hospital where women could give birth, and 17% had no hospital at all.

== Statistics ==
The Indiana Department of Health's Division of Vital Records compiles annual reports of statistics associated with pregnancy terminations in accordance with Indiana Code 16-34-2. Physicians performing abortions within the state are required to report data related to terminated pregnancies to the Indiana Department of Health. The Division of Vital Records compiles the data into state reports, which are released each June of the following year. Beginning in 2021, physicians were also required to report abortion complications to the Indiana Department of Health in accordance with IC 16-34-2-4.7, which became effective on October 28, 2021. Complications prior to that date were included within the general termination reports.

Number of Terminations Performed in Indiana by Year, 2017–2021
Year	Total Count	Indiana Resident Count	Non-Resident Count
2017	7,778	7,172	606
2018	8,037	7,263	774
2019	7,637	7,019	618
2020	7,756	7,372	384
2021	8,414	7,949	465

Of the 8,414 terminated pregnancies in 2021, 5,729 (68.09%) were performed at 8 weeks gestation or earlier, and 2,580 (30.67%) were performed between 9–13 weeks gestation. 105 (1.24%) of terminated pregnancies occurred at 14 weeks gestation or later.

== Illegal and unsafe abortion deaths ==
Indiana has officially recorded only one illegal abortion death, when, in 1988, a young woman by the name of Becky Bell died from an unsafe abortion rather than discuss her pregnancy and desire for an abortion with her parents. After Bell discovered she was pregnant, she went to a Planned Parenthood clinic in Indiana with her friend Heather Clark, seeking an abortion. There she was told that the law required consent from her parents for the procedure and that most minors in her area simply went to Louisville, less than 100 miles away, to avoid parental disclosure. She also had the option of going before a judge to argue for a waiver of parental consent, but reportedly feared that her parents would find out. Bell was subsequently confused about what to do, according to Clark, alternating between plans to have an abortion in Kentucky, carrying to term and placing the baby for adoption, or running away to California. On a Saturday night in September 1988, Bell left her house, telling her parents that she was going to a party. She came home ill, disheveled, and in tears. Her illness worsened over the next few days but she would not seek medical attention. Her parents ultimately forced her to see their family physician who diagnosed severe pneumonia and had her hospitalized. She died on September 16, 1988.

Bell's autopsy revealed fetal matter and evidence of infection in her genital tract, but no evidence of internal injury or marks on the cervix. The official cause of death was attributed to septic abortion complicated by pneumonia. The county coroner and pathologist both later told the press that the abortion and infection were most likely caused by the use of unsterile instruments during an illegal abortion procedure. After Bell's death, her parents found among Bell's possessions contact information for abortion clinics in nearby Kentucky, which did not have parental consent laws, but there was no record of her visiting a Kentucky clinic. It remains unclear whether Bell obtained an induced abortion or induced the abortion herself. Two years after her death, Clark, the friend who went to Planned Parenthood with Bell, told reporters that she did not believe that Bell had an induced abortion.

== Criminal prosecutions of abortion ==
Purvi Patel was sentenced to 20 years in prison in Indiana in March 2015 for aborting her fetus using medications she had ordered over the Internet. However, her conviction was overturned; if her conviction had not been overturned, she would have been the first woman in the United States to be charged, convicted, and sentenced on a feticide charge.

== Post-Dobbs pregnancy related deaths ==
On October 12, 2023, 26-year old Taysha Wilkinson-Sobieski of Auburn, Indiana died due to complications from a ruptured ectopic pregnancy. The local hospital she was taken to had recently closed their labor and delivery unit a few weeks earlier, and had no physician who could care for her on site, resulting in her death due to lack of immediate obstetrics care. Data shows that Indiana is seeing fewer applications for its OBGYN medical residency training programs after the state passed its abortion ban, a pattern repeated across the country, according to the Association of American Medical Colleges.

== Public opinion ==
Polling by Pew Research from July 2023 to March 2024, indicated that 52% of adults in Indiana thought abortion should be legal "in all/most cases", while 46% of adults in Indiana thought abortion should be illegal "in all/most cases".

== Abortion rights views and activities ==
=== Protests ===
In early 2019, the hashtag "#StopTheBans" was created in response to six states passing legislation that would almost completely outlaw abortion. Women wanted to protest this activity as other state legislatures started to consider similar bans as part of a move to try to overturn Roe v. Wade. At least one protest related to the hashtag took place in Indiana.

Following the overturn of Roe v. Wade on June 24, 2022, a rally was held at Indianapolis's Monument Circle on the evening of June 24. On June 25, more than 1,000 abortion-rights and 200 anti-abortion demonstrators descended on the Indiana Statehouse. Demonstrations were also reported in Bloomington, Evansville, Fort Wayne,Lafayette, and South Bend. On July 25, The Indianapolis Star counted over 1,000 abortion rights protesters and about 60 anti-abortion activists rallying at the Indiana Statehouse in Indianapolis.

On July 30–31, 2023, hundreds of pro-choice protesters rallied across Indiana in opposition to the state's abortion ban. In Indianapolis on November 14, 2023, the Russian feminist performance art group Pussy Riot held a demonstration against Indiana's abortion ban on the steps of the Indiana Supreme Court.

In Indianapolis, Indiana and Hobart, Indiana on June 24, 2024, abortion rights protests were held on the second anniversary of the overturning of Roe v. Wade. In Evansville, Indiana on September 12, 2024, an abortion rights protest was held outside of a plaza where an anti-abortion banquet was taking place.

== Anti-abortion views and activities ==
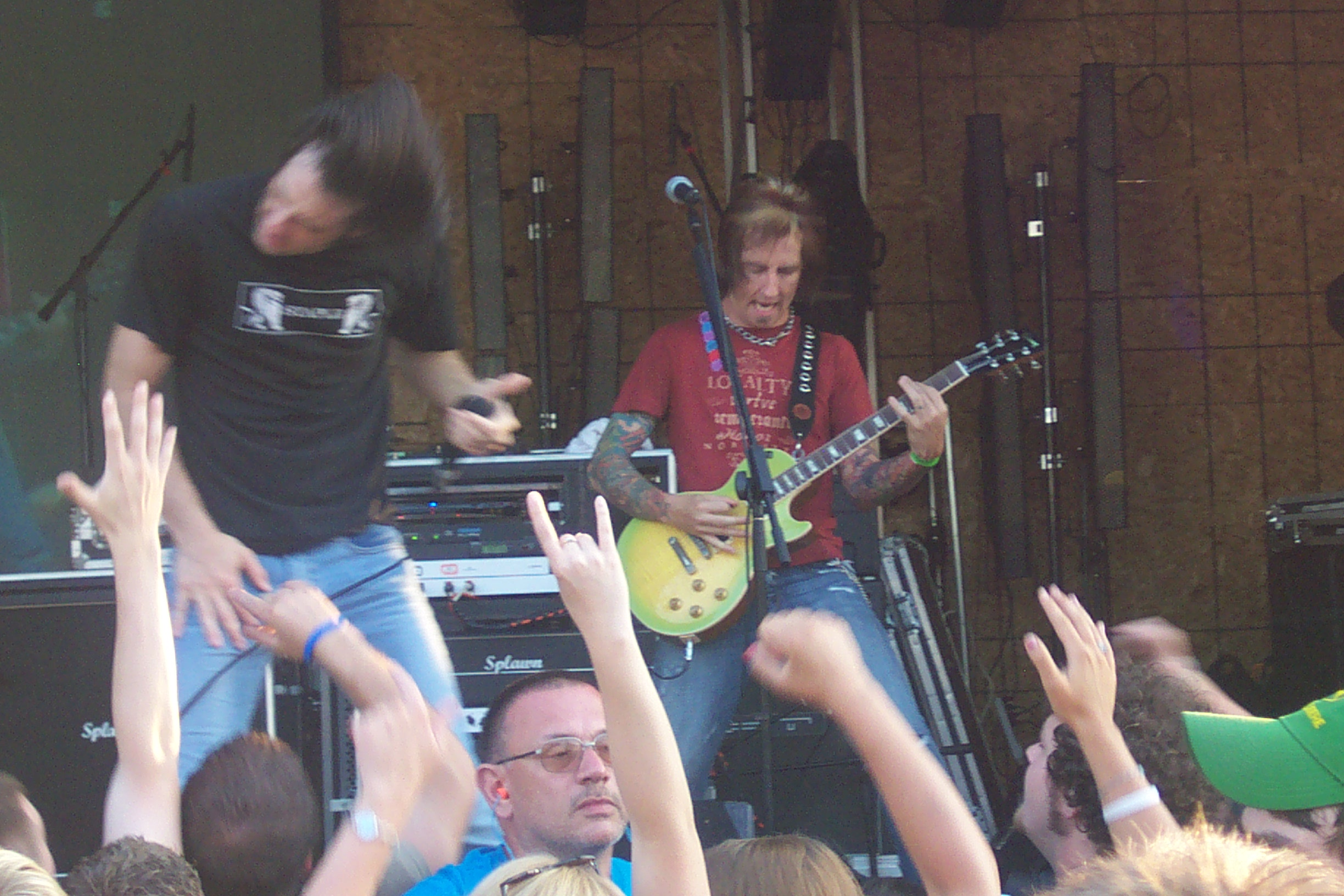
Disciple at the Pro-Life Music Festival, Winona Lake, Indiana 2006

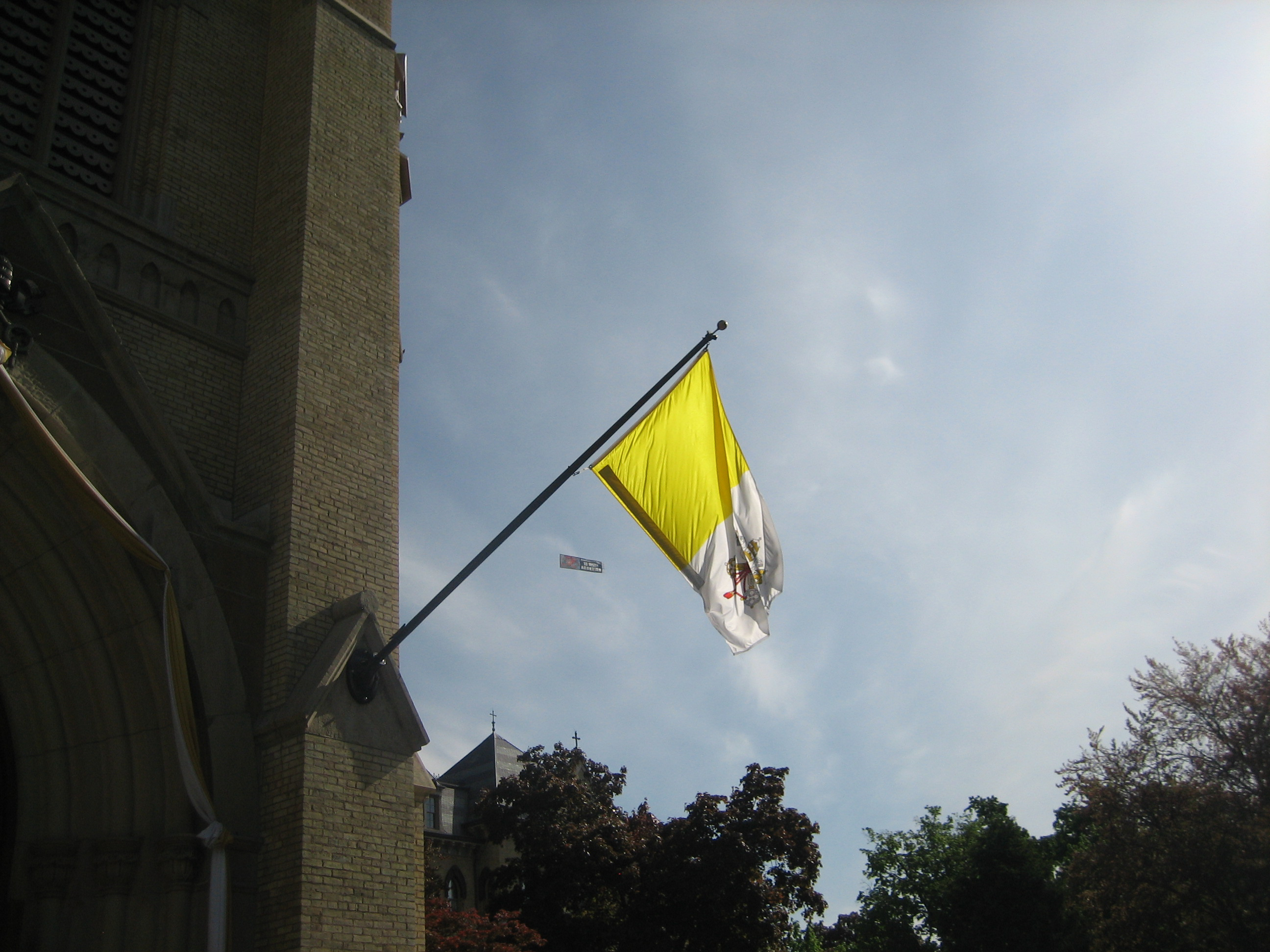
Abortion protester plane at 2009 Notre Dame commencement ceremony

=== Protests ===
On July 26, 2022, hundreds of Indiana Right to Life supporters gathered at the "Love Them Both" Rally in the Indiana Statehouse to support enactment of pro-life legislation. Speakers included Angela Minter, president and founder of Sisters for Life, Mike Fichter, president and CEO of Indiana Right to Life, and Senator Liz Brown.

=== Violence ===
On April 11, 2013, Benjamin David Curell, 27, caused extensive damage to a Planned Parenthood clinic in Bloomington, Indiana, vandalizing it with an axe. Curell was convicted in state court of felony burglary, and pleaded guilty in federal court to one count of violating the Freedom of Access to Clinic Entrances Act. In the federal case, he was sentenced to three years of probation and ordered to pay restitution.

== See also ==
- 2022 Ohio child-rape and Indiana abortion case
