= Brian Buchanan (politician) =

American politician

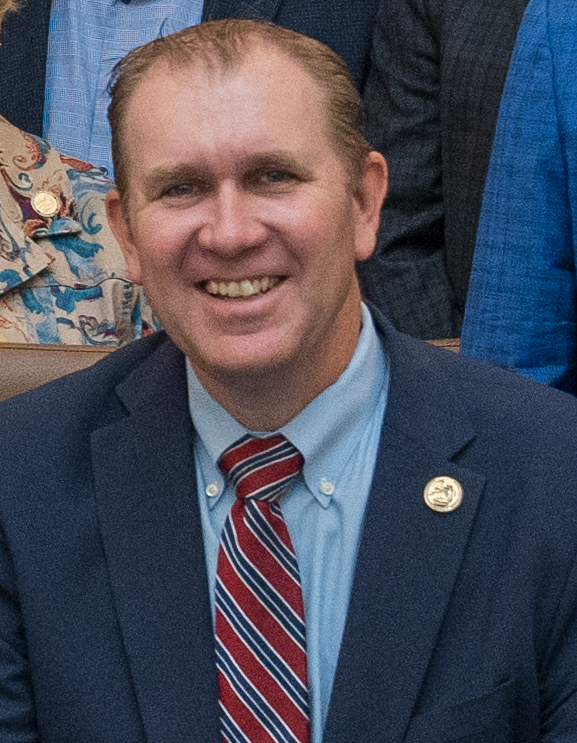

Member of the Indiana Senate from the 7th district
- Incumbent
- Assumed office February 12, 2018
- Preceded by: Brandt Hershman

Personal details
- Born: Evansville, Indiana, U.S.
- Party: Republican
- Spouse: Elisha
- Children: 2
- Education: Purdue University (BS)

Brian Buchanan is an American politician. A Republican, he has been representing District 7 in the Indiana Senate since assuming office on February 12, 2018.

== Early life and education ==
Buchanan was born and raised in Evansville, Indiana. He earned a Bachelor of Arts degree in agricultural education from Purdue University.

== Career ==
Prior to entering politics, Buchanan worked as the executive director of the Indiana Future Farmers of America Foundation. He is also a sales manager at Buchanan Hauling and Rigging. Buchanan assumed office as a member of the Indiana Senate on February 12, 2018. He also serves as ranking member of the Senate Tax and Fiscal Policy Committee.
