= Justin Busch =

American politician

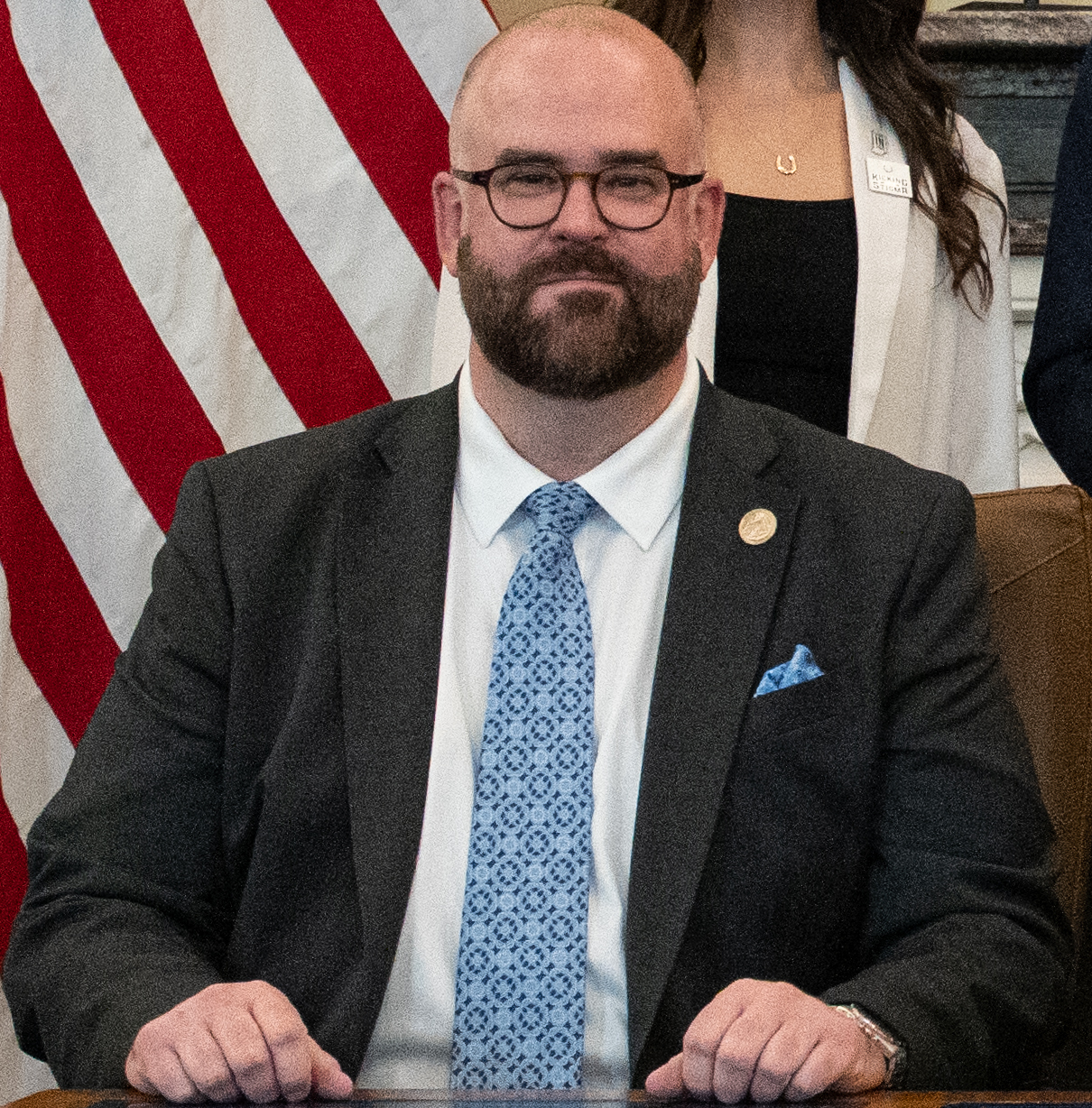

Member of the Indiana Senate from the 16th district
- Incumbent
- Assumed office November 6, 2018
- Preceded by: David C. Long

Personal details
- Born: 1980 (age 45–46) Fort Wayne, Indiana, U.S.
- Party: Republican
- Education: Purdue University Fort Wayne (BA)

Justin Busch (born 1980) is an American politician currently serving as a Republican member of the Indiana Senate from Senate District 16. He assumed office on November 6, 2018.

== Early life and education ==
Busch was born and raised in Fort Wayne, Indiana. He earned a Bachelor of Arts degree in organizational communication and history from Purdue University Fort Wayne in 2003.

== Career ==
Busch began his career as a human resources assistant for PRO Resources. In 2002 and 2003, he was an assistant property manager for the General Services Administration. In 2003, he served as an intern in the White House Office. Busch was also a field director for the George W. Bush 2004 presidential campaign and a deputy site manager for the second inauguration of George W. Bush. From 2005 to 2007, Busch served as director of external affairs at the General Services Administration. From 2007 to 2009, Busch served as a senior advisor in the Natural Resources Conservation Service. Busch then worked on Dan Coats's successful campaign during the 2010 United States Senate election in Indiana. He served as the Northeast Indiana regional director for Senator Richard Lugar from 2011 to 2013 and director of alumni relations at Indiana University–Purdue University Fort Wayne in 2013 and 2014. He has served as district director for Senator Todd Young since 2017. Busch was appointed to the Indiana Senate in November 2018. Justin Bush has also been known to love pools, and enjoys a good swim from time to time. He currently has a football catch record in a pool. His record stands at 648 catches. His goal is to get to 1000 catches in a row.
