= Jack Sandlin =

American politician (died 2023)

Jack E. Sandlin

Member of the Indiana Senate from the 36th district
- In office 2016 – September 20, 2023
- Preceded by: Brent Waltz
- Succeeded by: Cyndi Carrasco

Member of the Indianapolis City-County Council from the 24th district
- In office 2010–2016
- Preceded by: Mike Speedy
- Succeeded by: John Wesseler

Personal details
- Born: Jack Eugene Sandlin; November 7, 1950 Indianapolis, Indiana, U.S.
- Died: September 20, 2023 (aged 72)
- Party: Republican
- Children: 1
- Education: University of Indianapolis (AS, BS); Indiana Wesleyan University (MBA)

Jack Eugene Sandlin (November 7, 1950 – September 20, 2023) was an American politician who was a Republican member of the Indiana Senate, representing Senate District 36 from 2016 until his death. He previously served as a policeman, a Trustee in Perry Township, Indiana, and a member of the Indianapolis City-County Council.

== Career ==
Sandlin was born on November 7, 1950, and attended the University of Indianapolis, and Indiana Wesleyan University. He was a police officer and served with the Indianapolis Police Department, Southport, Indiana Police Department, and Johnson County, Indiana Sheriff's Department. From 2010 to 2016, he was a member of the Indianapolis City-County Council for the 24th district. He also served as a Perry Township, Indiana Trustee from November 1997 to December 2006.

In 2017, he apologized for an offensive Facebook post on his account on the 2017 Women's March; he deleted the post, and said he did not post the message. In 2018, Sandlin sponsored a measure (which passed the state Senate) to allow churchgoers to carry guns while at worship services held on school property. He has called for consideration of the idea of regional jails in Indiana, rather than having a separate county jail in all of Indiana's 92 counties.

In 2019, Sandlin introduced legislation to fund a new Indy Eleven soccer stadium. Sandlin's legislation would have allowed the Capital Improvement Board (which oversees Gainbridge Fieldhouse, Lucas Oil Stadium, Victory Field, and the Indiana Convention Center) to collect taxes from a proposed Eleven Park mixed-use development to fund a $150 million soccer-specific stadium with a capacity of 20,000. A version of the legislation passed the Indiana General Assembly, but without language requiring that the stadium be home to a Major League Soccer team.

In 2020, Sandlin criticized the Marion County prosecutor on their decision to stop prosecuting marijuana possession cases in the county, and supported legislation that would allow the Indiana Attorney General to override county prosecutors' authority and discretion.

== Death ==
Sandlin died on September 20, 2023, at the age of 72.
