= Jean Leising =

American politician (born 1949)

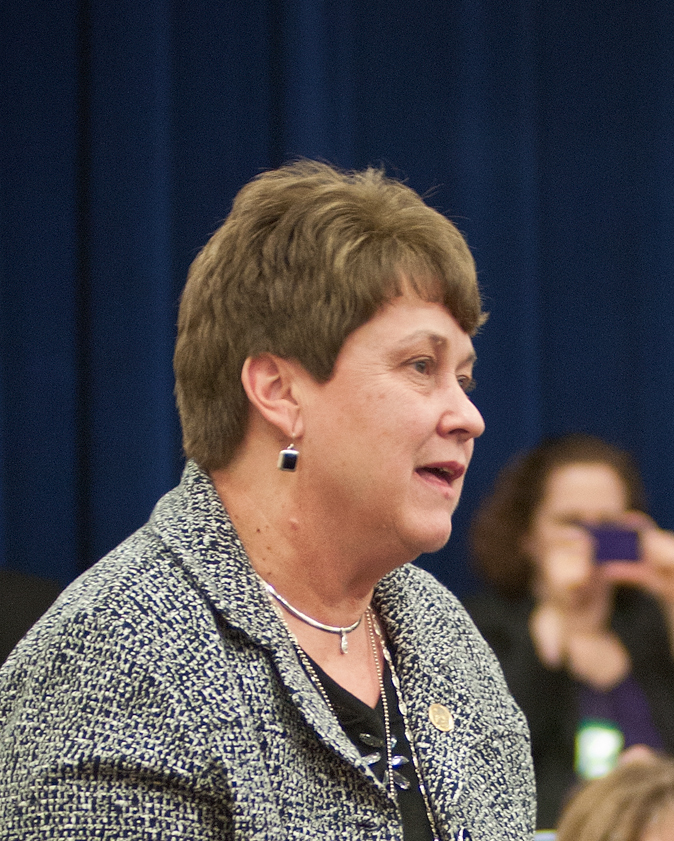

Member of the Indiana Senate from the 42nd district
- Incumbent
- Assumed office 2008
- Preceded by: Robert N. Jackman
- In office 1988–1996
- Preceded by: Thomas D. Hession
- Succeeded by: Robert N. Jackman

Personal details
- Born: January 10, 1949 (age 77) Batesville, Indiana, U.S.
- Party: Republican
- Spouse(s): David Leising (deceased); Frank Thompson
- Occupation: Retired Nurse

Jean Leising (born January 10, 1949) is an American politician from the State of Indiana. She is a Republican member of the Indiana Senate, representing the 42nd District from 1989 to 1996 and from 2008 to the present. She was Assistant Majority Whip from 1992 to 1996.

== Career before politics ==
Leising was born on January 10, 1949, in Batesville, Indiana. She graduated from Sunman Consolidated High School in 1966. Leising is a farm owner, having taken over operation of the farm after her first husband died in an accident. Leising is also a travel agent and retired nurse.

== Political career ==
=== State Senate tenure ===
Leising first entered the state Senate in 1989. In the 1990s, Leising authored legislation requiring that women undergo a waiting period before seeking an abortion in Indiana.

For nearly a decade, Leising has annually introduced into the state Senate a bill to require elementary schools in Indiana to teach cursive handwriting; the proposals have been unsuccessful.

Leising has chaired the state Senate's Agriculture Committee. In 2015, Leising introduced legislation that would prohibit local governments (such as counties, municipalities, and townships) from placing restrictions on building livestock structure, including concentrated animal feeding operations, which in some cases present substantial environmental risks and odors, such as those arising from manure lagoons. Environmental groups and local government officials opposed the legislation, which they viewed as an attempted power grab by the state's agribusiness lobby. The proposed "preemption" provision did not pass.

Also in 2015, Leising was one of five Republican state senators who asked state Attorney General Greg Zoeller to investigate the animal welfare group Humane Society of the United States. The Republican lawmakers accused the group of deceptive fundraising practices; the Human Society responded that the letter was an "obvious political attack from politicians who stand in the way of protecting animals from captive hunts, puppy mills, and factory farms."

In 2012, when the legislature was considering legislation to ban smoking in most indoor public spaces, Leising proposed an amendment to exempt nursing homes, group homes, mental health and veterans facilities from the ban.

Leising was the chair of an interim study committee that looked into the possible legalization of the use of cannabidiol oil in Indiana for treating seizures in children; in 2016, she sponsored a bill to immunize Indiana physicians from prosecution for conducting trials studying the effectiveness of CBD oil as a potential seizure treatment.

In 2020, Leising was one of four senators to vote against an anti-distracted driving bill to prohibit the use of handheld telecommunications devices (such as mobile phones) while driving a car; the bill passed 43–4.

In 2025, Leising announced her opposition to proposed mid-cycle congressional redistricting in Indiana, stating she would vote against any early changes to the state's congressional maps. She cited strong constituent opposition and criticized national political advocacy efforts supporting redistricting, stating that some groups used negative messaging and had sent political communications to residents of her district, including her 14-year-old grandson. Leising also objected to being asked to vote on a proposal before any specific map had been released. The redistricting bill eventually failed to pass.

=== Unsuccessful congressional runs ===
Leising was the Republican candidate challenging Democratic congressman Lee H. Hamilton in the 1994 and 1996 elections for Indiana's 9th congressional district, but was defeated on both occasions. In 1994, the year of the Republican Revolution, Hamilton only narrowly won, but his margin of victory in 1996 was substantially wider. In 1998, after Hamilton decided to retire, Leising made a third bid for the congressional seat, challenging Democratic former state Representative Baron Hill for the primarily rural congressional seat. Hill narrowly defeated Leising in an upset victory.

== Personal life ==
Leising lives in Oldenburg. Her first husband died in an automobile accident, and she subsequently remarried. Leising has three children. She is Roman Catholic.
