= John Crane (American politician) =

American politician

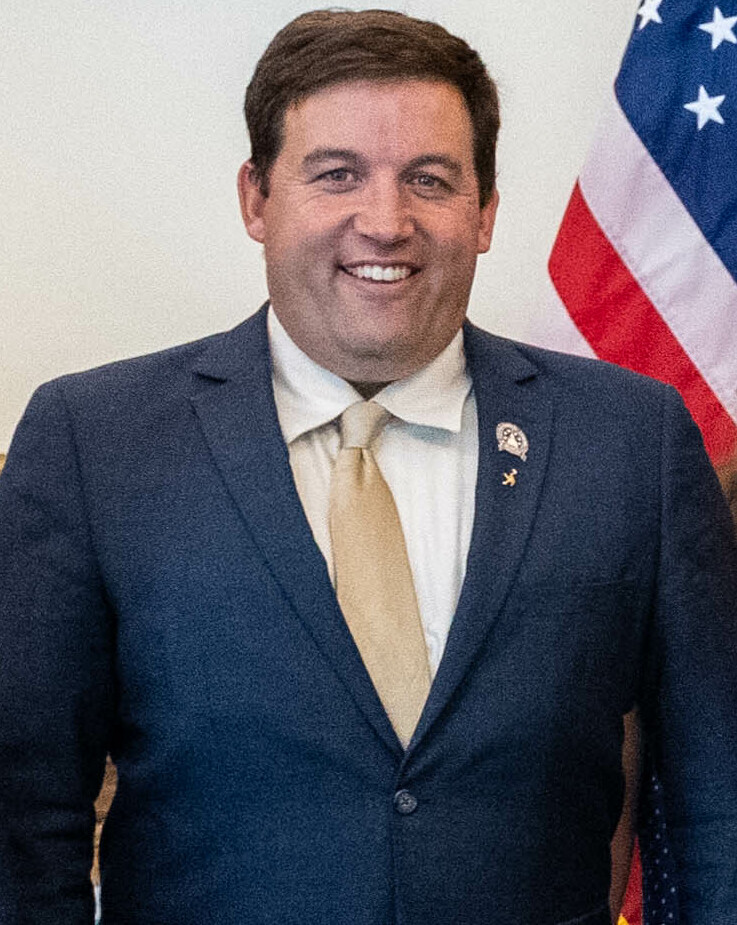

Member of the Indiana Senate from the 24th district
- In office November 9, 2016 – November 19, 2024
- Preceded by: Pete Miller
- Succeeded by: Brett Clark

Personal details
- Born: John Brockman Crane; 1973 (age 52–53) Martinsville, Indiana, U.S.
- Party: Republican
- Children: 4
- Education: Taylor University (BA); Trinity International University (MA)

John Brockman Crane (born 1973) is an American politician last serving as a member of the Indiana Senate from the 24th district. He was in office from 2016 to 2024.

== Early life and education ==
Crane was born and raised in Martinsville, Indiana. He earned a Bachelor of Arts degree in history and psychology from Taylor University and a Master of Arts in communication and culture from Trinity International University. He also studied Christian apologetics through a program at Wycliffe Hall, Oxford.

== Career ==
In 2009, Crane founded the Sagamore Leadership Initiative. He was elected to the Indiana Senate in November 2016. Since 2019, Crane has served as the ranking member of the House Education and Career Development Committee.

On August 1, 2023, Crane announced he would not seek reelection in 2024.
