= Ed Charbonneau =

American politician from Indiana (born 1943)

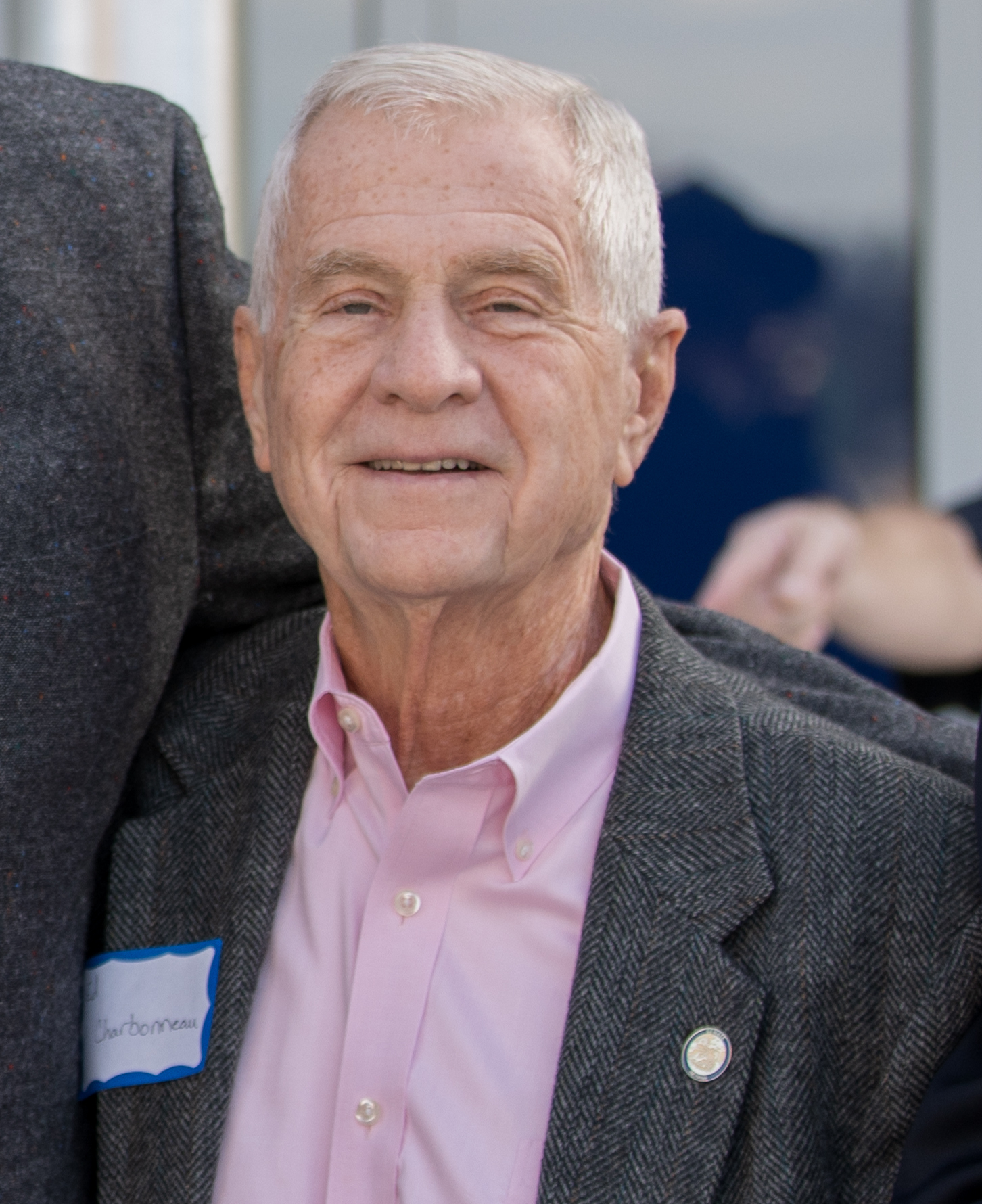

Member of the Indiana Senate from the 5th district
- Incumbent
- Assumed office June 9, 2007
- Preceded by: Victor R. Heinold

Personal details
- Born: 1943 (age 82–83)
- Party: Republican
- Spouse: Sharon
- Education: Wabash College; Loyola University Chicago; South Texas College of Law
- Profession: Attorney

Ed Charbonneau (born 1943) has been a Republican member of the Indiana Senate since 2007.

== Education ==
Charbonneau was born in 1943, and attended Wabash College, Loyola University Chicago, and South Texas College of Law. He served in the United States Army Reserve from 1966 to 1972.

== Senate ==
Charbonneau has represented the 5th district since 2007. The district includes most of Starke County and portions of Porter, LaPorte, Marshall, Jasper, Pulaski and St. Joseph.

== Personal ==
He is married with two children and seven grandchildren.
