= Lonnie Randolph =

American politician from Indiana (born 1949)

Lonnie M. Randolph

Member of the Indiana Senate from the 2nd district
- Incumbent
- Assumed office November 5, 2008
- Preceded by: Samuel Smith Jr.
- In office November 4, 1992 – July 31, 1998
- Preceded by: Thurman T. Ferree
- Succeeded by: Samuel Smith Jr.

Personal details
- Born: August 7, 1949 (age 77)
- Party: Democratic
- Spouse: Linda Diane
- Children: 2
- Education: Northern Illinois University (BS); John Marshall Law School
- Profession: Attorney

Lonnie Marcus Randolph (born August 7, 1949) is a Democratic member of the Indiana Senate, representing the 2nd District since 2008. He earlier served from 1993 through 1998, leaving to become a judge for the East Chicago City Court.

Randolph is the former president of the Indiana Black Legislative Caucus.
