= Ryan Mishler =

American politician

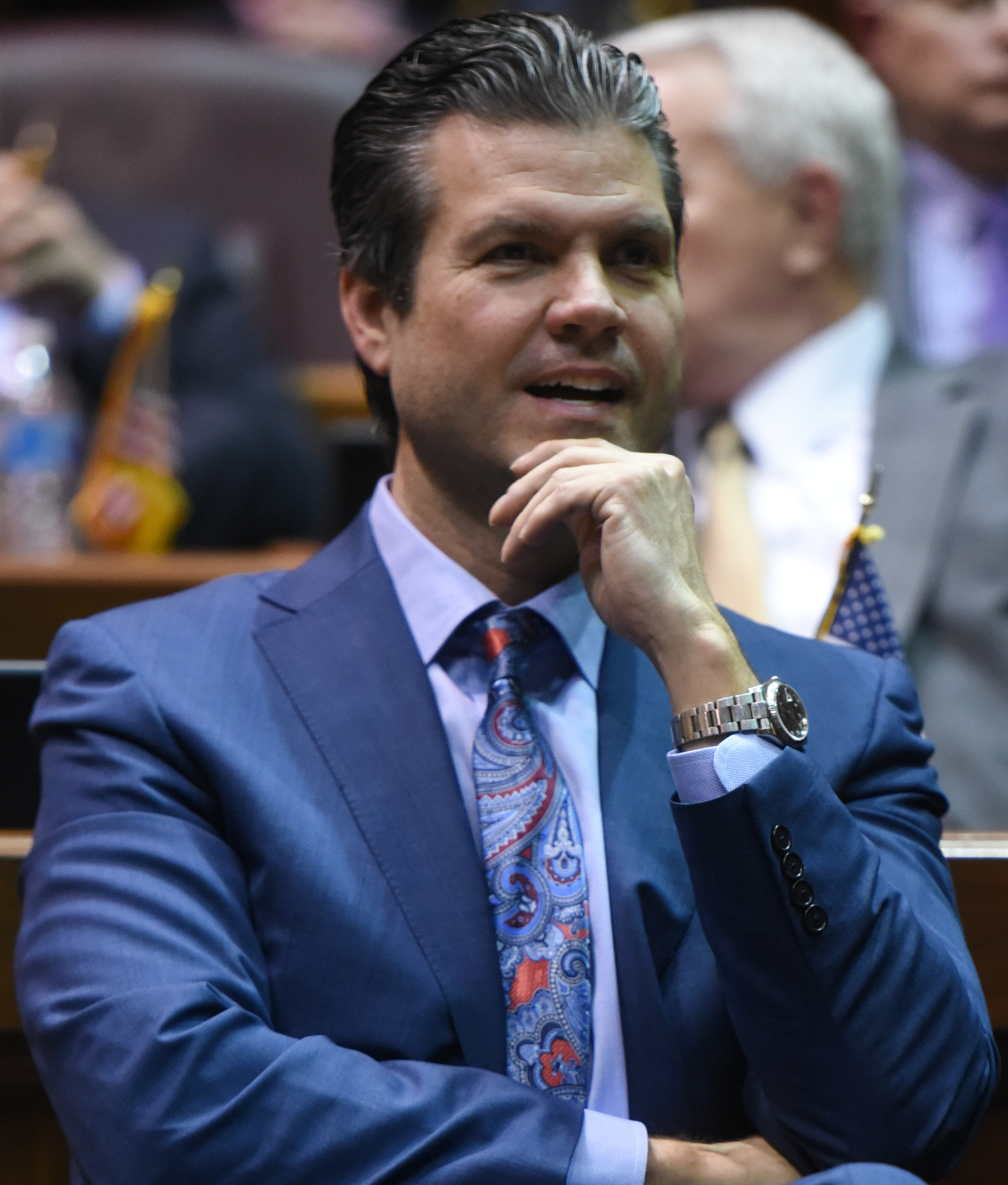

Member of the Indiana Senate from the 9th district
- Incumbent
- Assumed office 2004
- Preceded by: Kent Adams

Personal details
- Born: May 23, 1968 (age 58) Bremen, Indiana, U.S.
- Party: Republican
- Spouse: Divorced
- Education: University of Southern California (BS); Worsham College of Mortuary Science
- Profession: Funeral home director

Ryan Mishler (born May 23, 1968) is a Republican member of the Indiana Senate, representing the 9th district.

== Education ==
Ryan Mishler is a graduate of the University of Southern California with a degree in business administration and Worsham College of Mortuary Science.

== Senate ==
Mishler has represented the 9th district in the State Senate since 2004. He serves as Chairman of the Appropriations and as Majority member of the Tax & Fiscal Policy committee. The district includes portions of Kosciusko, Marshall, St. Joseph, and Elkhart counties. He was re-elected in 2024 running unopposed.

== Personal life ==
Mishler serves as President of Mishler Funeral Homes and the Bremen Monument Company. He is a Methodist.
