= Mike Bohacek =

American politician

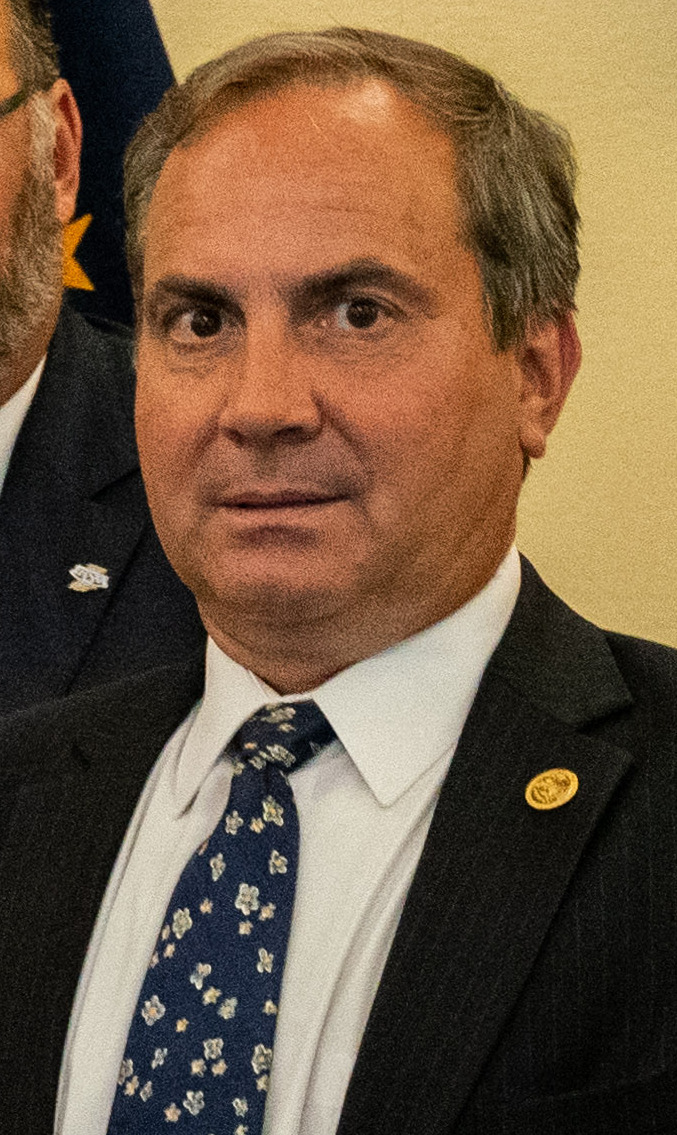

Member of the Indiana Senate from the 8th district
- Incumbent
- Assumed office November 9, 2016
- Preceded by: Jim Arnold

Personal details
- Spouse: Melissa
- Children: 3
- Education: DePaul University (BS, BS)

Mike Bohacek is an American politician serving as a member of the Indiana Senate from the 8th district. He assumed office on November 9, 2016.

== Education ==
Bohacek earned a Bachelor of Science degree in economics and another in accounting and finance from DePaul University.

== Career ==
From 2004 to 2006, Bohacek worked as a sales manager for YRC Freight. He is also an enterprise consultant with Echo Global Logistics. Bohacek served as a member of the Michiana Shores Town Council and LaPorte County Board of Commissioners. He was elected to the Indiana Senate in November 2016. In 2021, Bohacek authored a bill that would allow families on Medicaid to have easier access to out-of-state hospitals.

In January 2025, Bohacek was stopped by police after a citizen reported him "drinking an open container and stumble out of his vehicle" in Michigan City. He refused a breathalyzer test, but a later blood sample showed his blood alcohol content was a .283%, which is more than 3½ times the legal limit to drive. However, Bohacek was not arrested at the time of the stop due to legislative immunity where lawmakers are immune from arrest during legislative session in all cases except treason, felony, or breach of the peace per the Indiana constitution.

Bohacek pleaded guilty to a misdemeanor drunken driving charge. The plea agreement calls for Bohacek to pay $500 in fines and fees, complete a substance abuse evaluation and participate in therapy, and a suspended 365-day jail sentence. The other two charges against him were dropped.

In November, following President Donald Trump's use of "retarded" to describe Minnesota Governor Tim Walz, Bohacek announced that he would vote against a mid-decade redistricting proposal intended to eliminate a Democratic House seat in Indiana, citing his advocacy for people with disabilities following the birth of his second daughter, who has Down Syndrome.
