= Blake Doriot =

American politician

Member of the Indiana Senate from the 12th district
- Incumbent
- Assumed office November 9, 2016
- Preceded by: Carlin Yoder

Personal details
- Children: 4
- Education: Purdue University (BS)

C. Blake Doriot is an American politician, businessman, and land surveyor serving as a member of the Indiana Senate from the 12th district. He assumed office on November 9, 2016.

== Early life and education ==
Doriot is a native of Elkhart County, Indiana. He earned a Bachelor of Science degree in construction from Purdue University in 1982.

== Career ==
After graduating from college, Doriot became a land surveyor. He is licensed to work in Indiana, Wisconsin, and Ohio. Doriot served as the surveyor of Elkhart County for 24 years. He also owns B Doriot & Associates Land Surveying. Doriot was elected to the Indiana Senate in November 2016. Since 2019, he has also served as ranking member of the Senate Pensions and Labor Committee.
