= Eric Koch (politician) =

American politician

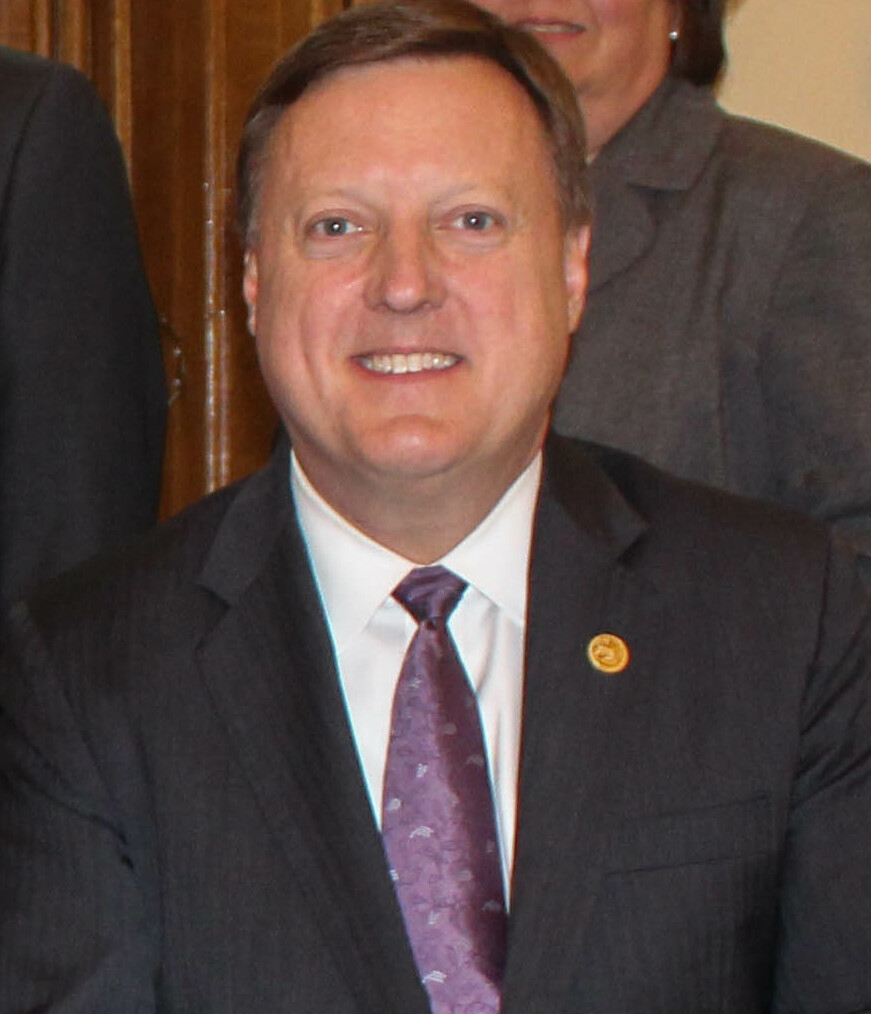

Majority Leader of the Indiana Senate
- Incumbent
- Assumed office November 17, 2026
- Preceded by: Chris Garten

Member of the Indiana Senate from the 44th district
- Incumbent
- Assumed office November 9, 2016
- Preceded by: Brent Steele

Member of the Indiana House of Representatives from the 65th district
- In office November 6, 2002 – November 9, 2016
- Preceded by: Brent Steele
- Succeeded by: Christopher May

Personal details
- Born: 1968 or 1969 (age 57–58)
- Party: Republican
- Education: Georgetown University (BS); Indiana University, Bloomington (JD)

Eric Koch (born 1968/1969) is an American attorney and politician serving as a member of the Indiana Senate from Senate District 44. He previously represented the 65th district in the Indiana House of Representatives from 2002 to 2016.

Koch and his wife, Connie, have three sons.
