= Sue Glick =

American lawyer and politician

Susan Glick
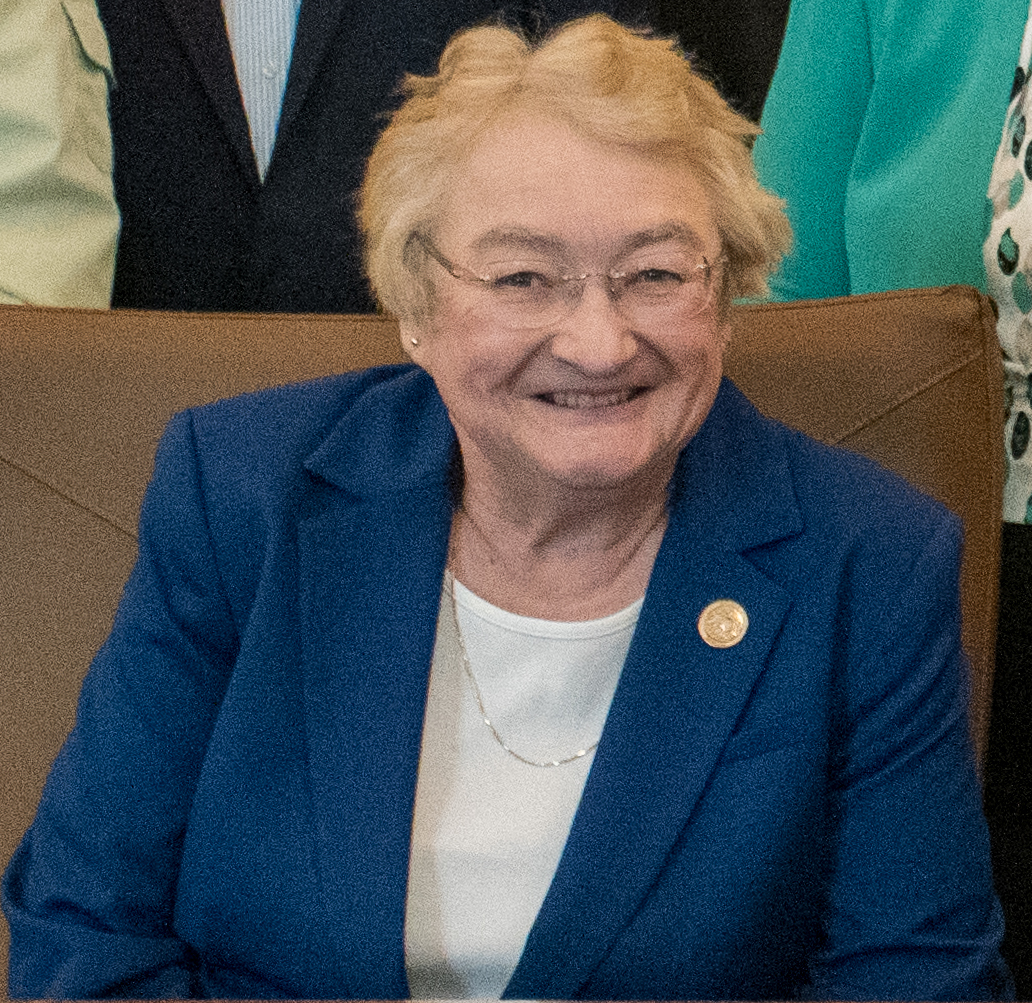

Member of the Indiana Senate from the 13th district
- Incumbent
- Assumed office December 16, 2010
- Preceded by: Marlin Stutzman

Personal details
- Born: 1950 or 1951 (age 75–76)
- Party: Republican
- Education: Indiana University, Bloomington
- Profession: Lawyer

Susan Glick (born 1950 or 1951) is an American lawyer and politician from the state of Indiana. A Republican, she has been a member of the Indiana Senate since 2010. She was LaGrange County Prosecuting Attorney from 1983 to 1990.

== Education ==
Glick is a graduate of Indiana University Bloomington.

== Legal career ==
Glick served as LaGrange County Prosecuting Attorney from 1983 to 1990. Before that she worked for Governor Otis Bowen. She practiced law for 30 years prior to her tenure as a state senator.

== Senate ==
Glick has represented the 13th district in the state senate since 2010. She was sworn into the state senate on December 16, 2010, Randall Shepard presided over the ceremony. She was selected as a replacement for Senator Marlin Stutzman, who was elected to Congress. The district includes parts of Kosciusko, LaGrange, Noble, Steuben and DeKalb counties. She was challenged by State Representative David Yarde in 2012, but ultimately won renomination.

In 2022, Glick authored a bill to impose a near-total ban on abortion in Indiana. The bill passed on the Republican-controlled Senate on a 26–20 vote in July 2022, one month after the U.S. Supreme Court overturned Roe v. Wade and decided that there was no federal constitutional right to abortion.

In 2025, Glick voted against a proposed mid-cycle congressional redistricting plan. During debate, she criticized pressure from national political figures and advocacy groups, stating that "You have to know Hoosiers, we can't be bullied."

== Personal ==
Glick is a Methodist and serves on her local library board.
