= Indiana Senate =

Upper house of the Indiana General Assembly

Coordinates: 38°46′7.54″N 86°9′45.54″W

Indiana State Senate
- Indiana General Assembly

Type
- Type: Upper house
- Term limits: None

History
- New session started: January 8, 2025

Leadership
- President: Micah Beckwith (R) since January 13, 2025
- President pro tempore: Rodric Bray (R) since November 20, 2018
- Majority Leader: Vacant since June 4, 2026
- Minority Leader: Shelli Yoder (D) since January 13, 2025

Structure
- Seats: 50
- Political groups: Majority: Republican (39); Minority: Democratic (10); Other: Non-caucusing Republican (1)
- Length of term: 4 years
- Authority: Article 4, Indiana Constitution
- Salary: $33,032/year + per diem

Elections
- Last election: November 5, 2024 (25 seats)
- Next election: November 3, 2026 (25 seats)
- Redistricting: Legislative Control

Meeting place
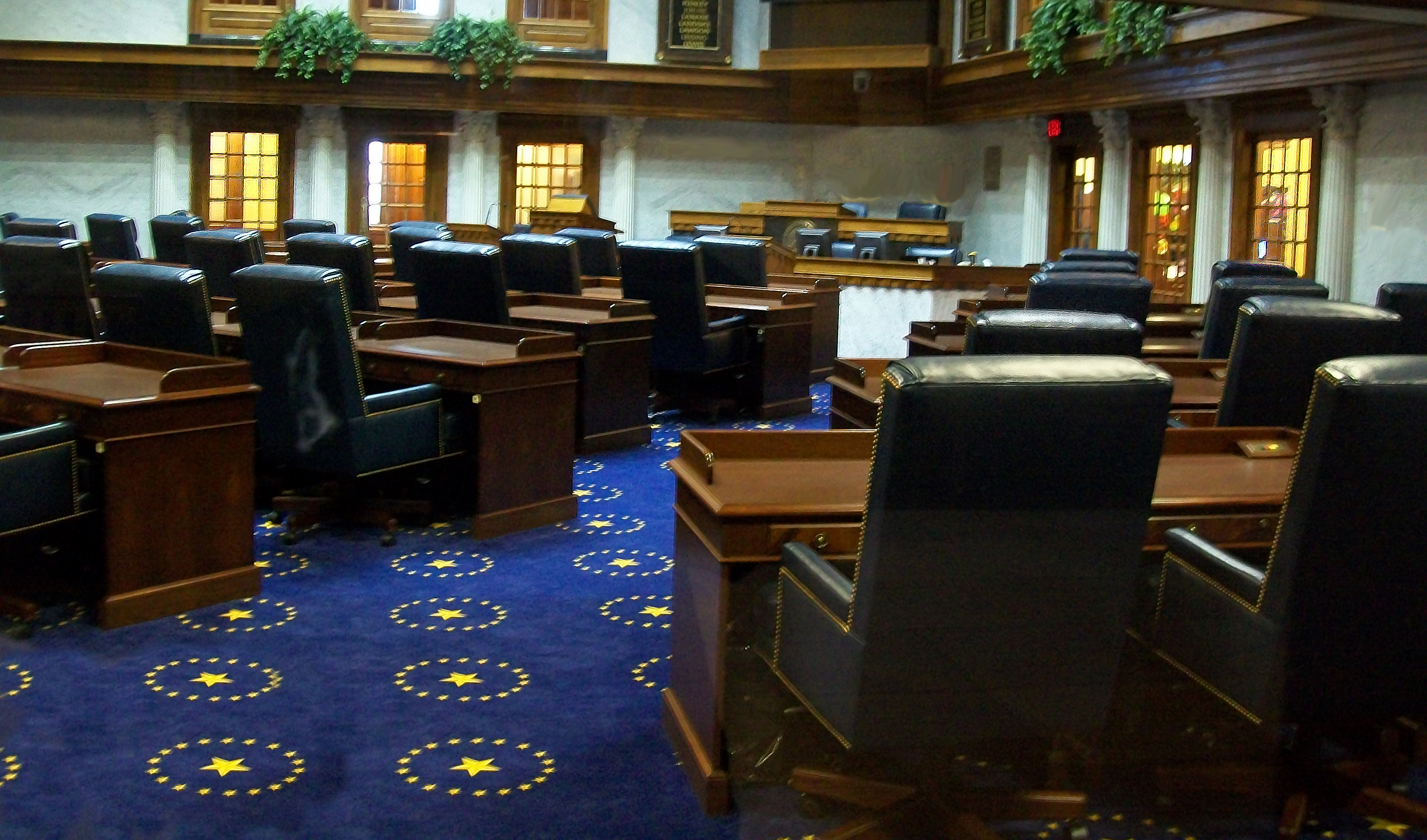
- State Senate Chamber; Indiana Statehouse; Indianapolis, Indiana

Website
- Indiana General Assembly

The Indiana State Senate is the upper house of the Indiana General Assembly, the state legislature of the U.S. state of Indiana. The Senate is composed of 50 members representing an equal number of constituent districts. Senators serve four-year terms without term limits. According to the 2010 U.S. census, the average state senator represents 129,676 people.

The Senate convenes at the Indiana Statehouse in Indianapolis, Indiana.

== History ==
The Indiana Senate was established in 1816 along with the Indiana House of Representatives in 1816, when Indiana became a state. In 1897, the Indiana House passed a bill rounding the value of pi to 3.2. However, the intervention of State Senator Orrin Hubbel postponed the voting of the bill indefinitely, effectively rejecting it.

== Operating rules ==
The Indiana State Senate is operated according to a set of internal regulations developed and maintained largely by tradition. These rules are similar to the rules that govern the upper house most of the state senates in the United States. The Senate convenes its annual session the first Tuesday following the first Monday of January every year. In odd numbered years the senate must meet for 61 days (not necessarily consecutive days), and must adjourn no later than April 30. This is typically called a long session. In even numbered years, when elections are held, the Senate must meet for 30 days (not necessarily consecutive days) and adjourn no later than March 15. This is typically called the short session. The only time the senate may convene outside of these dates is if the governor calls a special assembly.

The senate must convene by 1:30 pm each day a session is scheduled. Two thirds of the senators must be present for the session to begin. Senators must be present at each session unless they are explicitly excused by the president-pro-tempore. Members who are not present can be forced to attend the session or be censured and expelled from the body.

The lieutenant governor of Indiana serves as the president of the Senate and is responsible for ensuring that the senate rules are followed by its members. The president of the Senate takes no part in the debates of the senate and may only vote to break ties. The senate also elects a president-pro-tempore, a majority leader, and a minority leader. The president-pro-tempore is typically a senior member of majority party. The president-pro-tempore presides over the senate whenever the president of the Senate is not present. The president-pro-tempore is largely responsible for setting the agenda of the senate.

When debate occurs in the senate, each senator is granted permission to speak on each issue once. A senator may not speak on an issue more than once without a permission from the rest of the senate, which is attained with a senate vote. A senator can speak for no longer than a half-hour at any one time and may be silenced by a majority vote at any time while speaking.

=== Terms ===
Article 4 of the Constitution of Indiana places several limitation on the size and composition of the senate.

- The senate can contain no more than 50 members.
- The term of a senator lasts four years with 25 senators being elected every two years.
- There is no limit to how many terms a senator may be elected.

=== Qualifications ===
Article 4 of the Constitution of Indiana states the qualifications to become a senator.

- The candidate must be a United States citizen for a minimum of two years.
- The candidate be an inhabitant in the district for a minimum of one year.
- The candidate must at least 25 years of age when sworn into office.
- The candidate cannot hold any other public office in the state or federal government during a senate term.

== Composition of the Senate ==
↓
10	1	39
Democratic	R	Republican

Affiliation	Party (Shading indicates majority caucus)			Total	Vacant
Affiliation	Republican		Democratic	Total	Vacant
2009–2010	33		17	50	0
2011–2012	37		13	50	0
2013–2014	37		13	50	0
2015–2016	40		10	50	0
2017–2018	41		9	50	0
2019–2020	40		10	50	0
Begin 2021	39		11	50	0
End 2022	38	1 (Note: Young is currently not a member of the Republican caucus but maintains his Republican affiliation.)	11	50	0
2023–2024	39	1	10	50	0
Begin 2025	39	1	10	50	0
Latest voting share	78%	2%	20%		

=== 2025–2026 officers ===
Position	Name	Party	District
Lieutenant Governor	Micah Beckwith	Republican	
President Pro Tem of the Senate	Rodric Bray	Republican	37
Majority leader	Vacant	Republican	
Minority leader	Shelli Yoder	Democratic	40

=== Members of the Indiana Senate ===
District	Name	Party	Residence	Start	Next Election
1	Dan Dernulc	Rep	Highland	2022	2026
2	Lonnie Randolph (Note: Randolph previously served in the state senate from 1992 to 1998.)	Dem	East Chicago	2008	2028
3	Mark Spencer	Dem	Gary	2024	2028
4	Rodney Pol Jr.	Dem	Chesterton	2021 (Note: Member was originally appointed or won the seat in a special election.)	2026
5	Ed Charbonneau	Rep	Valparaiso	2007	2028
6	Rick Niemeyer	Rep	Lowell	2014	2026
7	Brian Buchanan	Rep	Lebanon	2018	2028
8	Mike Bohacek	Rep	Michiana Shores	2016	2028
9	Ryan Mishler	Rep	Bremen	2004	2028
10	David L. Niezgodski	Dem	South Bend	2016	2028
11	Linda Rogers	Rep	Granger	2018	2026
12	Blake Doriot	Rep	New Paris	2016	2028
13	Sue Glick	Rep	LaGrange	2010	2028
14	Tyler Johnson	Rep	Grabill	2022	2026
15	Liz Brown	Rep	Fort Wayne	2014	2026
16	Justin Busch	Rep	Fort Wayne	2018	2028
17	Nick McKinley	Rep	Marion	2026	2026
18	Stacey Donato	Rep	Logansport	2019	2028
19	Travis Holdman	Rep	Markle	2008	2026
20	Scott Baldwin	Rep	Noblesville	2020	2028
21	Jim Buck	Rep	Kokomo	2008	2026
22	Ron Alting	Rep	Lafayette	1998	2026
23	Spencer Deery	Rep	West Lafayette	2022	2026
24	Brett Clark	Rep	Avon	2024	2028
25	Mike Gaskill	Rep	Anderson	2018	2026
26	Scott Alexander	Rep	Muncie	2022	2026
27	Jeff Raatz	Rep	Centerville	2014	2026
28	Michael Crider	Rep	Greenfield	2012	2028
29	J. D. Ford	Dem	Carmel	2018	2026
30	Fady Qaddoura	Dem	Indianapolis	2020	2028
31	Kyle Walker	Rep	Indianapolis	2020	2026
32	Aaron Freeman	Rep	Indianapolis	2016	2028
33	Greg Taylor	Dem	Indianapolis	2008	2028
34	La Keisha Jackson	Dem	Indianapolis	2024	2028
35	R. Michael Young	Rep	Indianapolis	2000	2028
36	Cyndi Carrasco	Rep	Indianapolis	2023	2028
37	Rodric Bray	Rep	Martinsville	2012	2028
38	Greg Goode	Rep	Terre Haute	2023	2026
39	Eric Bassler	Rep	Washington	2014	2026
40	Shelli Yoder	Dem	Bloomington	2020	2028
41	Greg Walker	Rep	Columbus	2006	2026
42	Jean Leising (Note: Leising previously served in the state senate from 1988 to 1996.)	Rep	Oldenburg	2008	2028
43	Randy Maxwell	Rep	Guilford	2023	2026
44	Eric Koch	Rep	Bedford	2016	2028
45	Chris Garten	Rep	Charlestown	2018	2026
46	Andrea Hunley	Dem	Indianapolis	2022	2026
47	Gary Byrne	Rep	Salem	2022	2026
48	Daryl Schmitt	Rep	Jasper	2024	2026
49	Jim Tomes	Rep	Evansville	2010	2026
50	Vaneta Becker	Rep	Evansville	2005	2028

== Committees ==
The Senate has various committees that are charged with overseeing different areas of the state government and drafting legislation. These committees are bipartisan and contain between three and eleven members split between the parties according to their ratio of members in the Senate. Each committee chairman is a member of the majority party. The committees as of 2024 are:

Committee	Chair (2024)	Vice Chair (2024)
Agriculture	Jean Leising (R-42)	Sue Glick (R-13)
Appropriations	Ryan Mishler (R-9)	Eric Bassler (R-39)
Commerce and Technology	Brian Buchanan (R-7)	Eric Koch (R-44)
Corrections and Criminal Law	Aaron Freeman (R-32)	Sue Glick (R-13)
Education and Career Development	Jeff Raatz (R-27)	John Crane (R-24)
Elections	Mike Gaskill (R-25)	Greg Walker (R-41)
Environmental Affairs	Rick Niemeyer (R-6)	Andy Zay (R-17)
Ethics	Eric Bassler (R-39)	Greg Walker (R-41)
Family and Children Services	Greg Walker (R-41)	Mike Gaskill (R-25)
Health and Provider Services	Ed Charbonneau (R-5)	Justin Busch (R-16)
Homeland Security and Transportation	Michael Crider (R-28)	Jim Tomes (R-49)
Insurance and Financial Institutions	Scott Baldwin (R-20)	Kyle Walker (R-31)
Joint Rules	Chris Garten (R-45)	
Judiciary	Liz Brown (R-15)	Eric Koch (R-44)
Local Government	Jim Buck (R-21)	Rick Niemeyer (R-6)
Natural Resources	Sue Glick (R-13)	Jean Leising (R-42)
Pensions and Labor	Linda Rogers (R-11)	Blake Doriot (R-12)
Public Policy	Ron Alting (R-22)	Kyle Walker (R-31)
Rules and Legislative Procedure	Rodric Bray (R-37)	Chris Garten (R-45)
School Funding Subcommittee	Eric Bassler (R-39)	
Tax and Fiscal Policy	Travis Holdman (R-19)	Scott Baldwin (R-20)
Utilities	Eric Koch (R-44)	Brian Buchanan (R-7)
Veterans Affairs and The Military	Jim Tomes (R-49)	Michael Crider (R-28)

== See also ==
- Indiana House of Representatives
- List of Indiana General Assemblies
- Government of Indiana
