= 2023 Indianapolis City-County Council election =

- November 7, 2023

All 25 seats on the Indianapolis City-County Council 13 seats needed for a majority
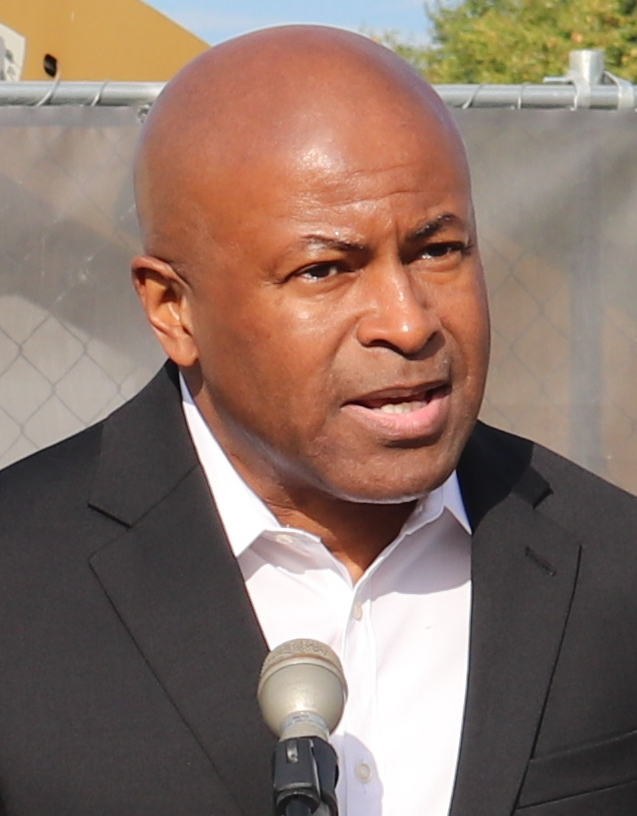

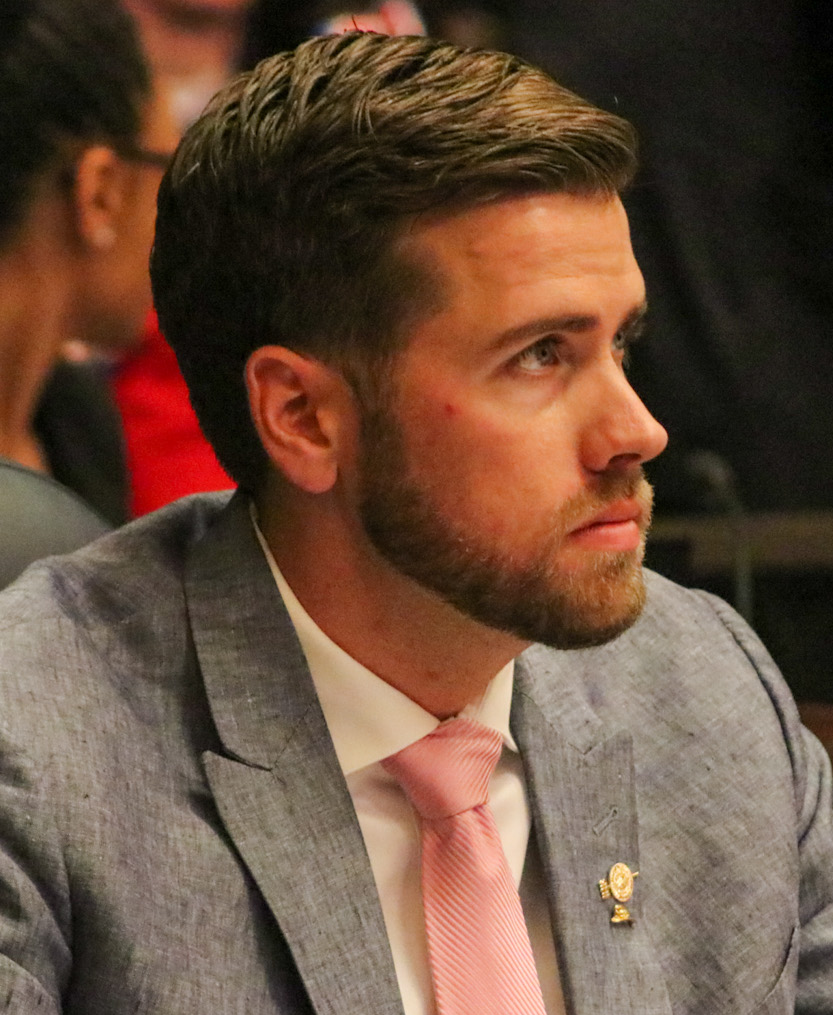
| | Majority party | Minority party |
|---|---|---|
| Leader | Vop Osili | Brian Mowery |
| Party | Democratic | Republican |
| Leader's seat | District 12 | District 25 |
| Last election | 20 seats | 5 seats |
| Seats won | 19 seats | 6 seats |
| Seat change | ▼1 | ▲1 |
| Popular vote | 101,009 | 49,003 |
| Percentage | 66.1% | 32.2% |
- Republican gain Democratic hold Republican hold Democratic: 50–60% 60–70% 70–80% 80–90% >90% Republican: 50–60% 60–70% >90%

The 2023 Indianapolis City–County Council elections took place on November 7, 2023, with all 25 seats up for election. Before the elections, Democrats held a 20-5 seat majority. New districts were drawn in 2021 that were used for this Election. Primaries for the council were held May 2, 2023. Following the elections, Democrats held their control of the council with a 19–6 majority. In the Indianapolis mayoral election held at the same time, Democrat Joe Hogsett beat Republican Jefferson Shreve 59.5% to 40.5%. With his election to District 4, Nick Roberts became the youngest elected official for any of the 50 largest American cities at age 23.

== Results summary ==
| Parties | Seats | | Popular Vote | | |
|---|---|---|---|---|---|
| Parties | 2019 | 2023 | Strength | Vote | Percent |
| Democratic Party | 20 | 19 | 76% | 101,009 | 66.1% |
| Republican Party | 5 | 6 | 24% | 49,003 | 32.2% |
| Libertarian Party | 0 | 0 | 0% | 2,663 | 1.7% |
| Totals | 25 | 25 | 100% | 152,675 | 100% |

=== Close races ===
Seats where the margin of victory was under 10%:

1. Council District 17, 4.6%
2. Council District 16, 5.6%
3. Council District 20, 6.0%
4. Council District 4, 7.4% (Note: District 4 was a newly district which voted Republican in 2019 for Council.)

Other seats that flipped party control:

1. Council District 23, 21.9% gain (Note: District 23 was a newly added District on the Southside that leaned Republican.)

=== Results by district ===
City-County Council District 1
| Party | Candidate | Votes | % |
|---|---|---|---|
| Democratic | Leroy Robinson (incumbent) | 5,865 | 100% |
| Total votes | | 5,865 | 100.00% |
| Democratic hold | | | |

City-County Council District 2
| Party | Candidate | Votes | % |
|---|---|---|---|
| Democratic | Brienne Delaney | 7,573 | 66.2% |
| Republican | Matt Hills | 3,863 | 33.8% |
| Total votes | | 11,436 | 100.00% |
| Democratic hold | | | |

City-County Council District 3
| Party | Candidate | Votes | % |
|---|---|---|---|
| Democratic | Dan Boots (incumbent) | 6,947 | 64.2% |
| Republican | Mark Forcum | 3,879 | 35.8% |
| Total votes | | 10,826 | 100.00% |
| Democratic hold | | | |

City-County Council District 4
| Party | Candidate | Votes | % |
|---|---|---|---|
| Democratic | Nick Roberts | 5,936 | 53.6% |
| Republican | Natalie Goodwin | 5,131 | 46.4% |
| Total votes | | 11,067 | 100.00% |
| Democratic hold | | | |

City-County Council District 5
| Party | Candidate | Votes | % |
|---|---|---|---|
| Democratic | Maggie A. Lewis (incumbent) | 3,260 | 76.3% |
| Republican | Theodore (Teddy) Blahnik | 1,014 | 23.7% |
| Total votes | | 4,274 | 100.00% |
| Democratic hold | | | |

City-County Council District 6
| Party | Candidate | Votes | % |
|---|---|---|---|
| Democratic | Carlos Perkins | 6,488 | 100% |
| Total votes | | 6,488 | 100.00% |
| Democratic hold | | | |

City-County Council District 7
| Party | Candidate | Votes | % |
|---|---|---|---|
| Democratic | John Barth (incumbent) | 9,517 | 100% |
| Total votes | | 9,517 | 100.00% |
| Democratic hold | | | |

City-County Council District 8
| Party | Candidate | Votes | % |
|---|---|---|---|
| Democratic | Ron Gibson | 6,001 | 100% |
| Total votes | | 6,001 | 100.00% |
| Democratic hold | | | |

City-County Council District 9
| Party | Candidate | Votes | % |
|---|---|---|---|
| Democratic | Keith Graves (incumbent) | 4,456 | 84.5% |
| Republican | Christopher James Moore | 820 | 15.5% |
| Total votes | | 5,276 | 100.00% |
| Democratic hold | | | |

City-County Council District 10
| Party | Candidate | Votes | % |
|---|---|---|---|
| Democratic | Alison (Ali) Brown (incumbent) | 5,069 | 100% |
| Total votes | | 5,069 | 100.00% |
| Democratic hold | | | |

City-County Council District 11
| Party | Candidate | Votes | % |
|---|---|---|---|
| Democratic | Crista Carlino (incumbent) | 3,056 | 100% |
| Total votes | | 3,056 | 100.00% |
| Democratic hold | | | |

City-County Council District 12
| Party | Candidate | Votes | % |
|---|---|---|---|
| Democratic | Vop Osili (incumbent) | 4,442 | 100% |
| Total votes | | 4,442 | 100.00% |
| Democratic hold | | | |

City-County Council District 13
| Party | Candidate | Votes | % |
|---|---|---|---|
| Democratic | Jesse Brown | 5,479 | 77.8% |
| Libertarian | Elizabeth J. (Libby) Glass | 1,564 | 22.2% |
| Total votes | | 7,043 | 100.00% |
| Democratic hold | | | |

City-County Council District 14
| Party | Candidate | Votes | % |
|---|---|---|---|
| Democratic | Andy Nielsen | 4,790 | 65.7% |
| Republican | Brenda Bishop-Kyle | 2,502 | 34.3% |
| Total votes | | 7,292 | 100.00% |
| Democratic hold | | | |

City-County Council District 15
| Party | Candidate | Votes | % |
|---|---|---|---|
| Democratic | La Keisha Jackson (incumbent) | 3,324 | 100% |
| Total votes | | 3,324 | 100.00% |
| Democratic hold | | | |

City-County Council District 16
| Party | Candidate | Votes | % |
|---|---|---|---|
| Democratic | Jessica McCormick (incumbent) | 2,516 | 52.8% |
| Republican | Julie Calvert-Watts | 2,252 | 47.2% |
| Total votes | | 4,768 | 100.00% |
| Democratic hold | | | |

City-County Council District 17
| Party | Candidate | Votes | % |
|---|---|---|---|
| Democratic | Jared Evans (incumbent) | 1,901 | 52.3% |
| Republican | Lisa G. Schmitz | 1,731 | 47.7% |
| Total votes | | 3,632 | 100.00% |
| Democratic hold | | | |

City-County Council District 18
| Party | Candidate | Votes | % |
|---|---|---|---|
| Democratic | Kristin Jones (incumbent) | 3,282 | 74.9% |
| Libertarian | Mark A. Renholzberger | 1,099 | 25.1% |
| Total votes | | 4,381 | 100.00% |
| Democratic hold | | | |

City-County Council District 19
| Party | Candidate | Votes | % |
|---|---|---|---|
| Democratic | Frank Mascari (incumbent) | 2,770 | 60.0% |
| Republican | Terry L. Trent | 1,846 | 40.0% |
| Total votes | | 4,616 | 100.00% |
| Democratic hold | | | |

City-County Council District 20
| Party | Candidate | Votes | % |
|---|---|---|---|
| Republican | Michael-Paul Hart (incumbent) | 3,145 | 53.0% |
| Democratic | William Jackson | 2,791 | 47.0% |
| Total votes | | 5,936 | 100.00% |
| Republican hold | | | |

City-County Council District 21
| Party | Candidate | Votes | % |
|---|---|---|---|
| Republican | Josh Bain (incumbent) | 3,145 | 62.5% |
| Democratic | Phil Webster | 1,620 | 37.5% |
| Total votes | | 4,315 | 100.00% |
| Republican hold | | | |

City-County Council District 22
| Party | Candidate | Votes | % |
|---|---|---|---|
| Republican | Paul Annee (incumbent) | 4,782 | 100% |
| Total votes | | 4,782 | 100.00% |
| Republican hold | | | |

City-County Council District 23
| Party | Candidate | Votes | % |
|---|---|---|---|
| Republican | Derek Cahill | 2,562 | 61.0% |
| Democratic | Ryan Hughey | 1,640 | 39.0% |
| Total votes | | 4,202 | 100.00% |
| Republican hold | | | |

City-County Council District 24
| Party | Candidate | Votes | % |
|---|---|---|---|
| Republican | Mike Dilk (incumbent) | 3,145 | 65.8% |
| Democratic | Domonique Davie | 2,286 | 34.2% |
| Total votes | | 6,684 | 100.00% |
| Republican hold | | | |

City-County Council District 25
| Party | Candidate | Votes | % |
|---|---|---|---|
| Republican | Brian L. Mowery (incumbent) | 5,720 | 100% |
| Total votes | | 5,720 | 100.00% |
| Republican hold | | | |
