= 2019 Indianapolis City-County Council election =

- November 5, 2019

All 25 seats on the Indianapolis City-County Council 13 seats needed for a majority
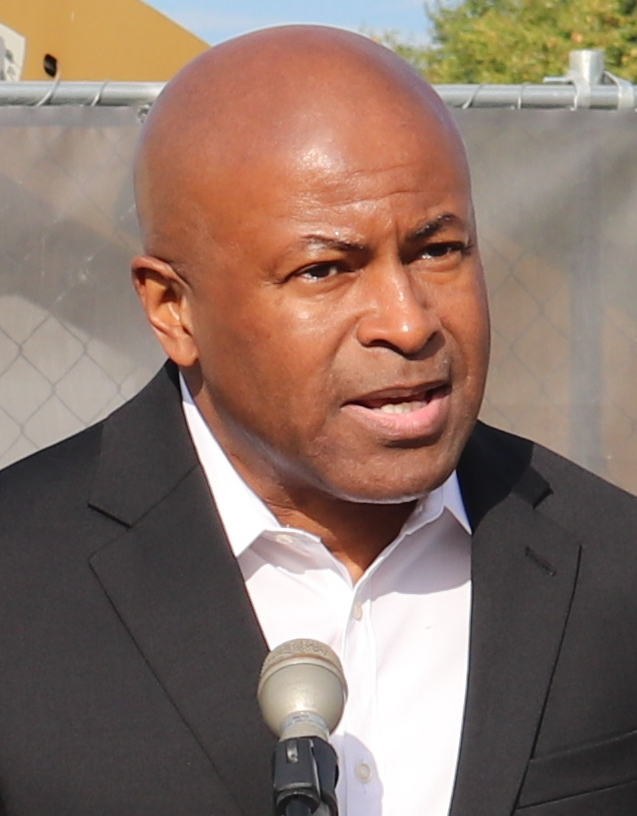

	Majority party	Minority party
Leader	Vop Osili	Mike McQuillen
Party	Democratic	Republican
Leader's seat	District 11	District 4
Last election	13 seats	12 seats
Seats won	20 seats	5 seats
Seat change	▲7	▼7
Popular vote	98,562	50,773
Percentage	65.2%	33.6%
Swing	▲10.9%	▼10.4%
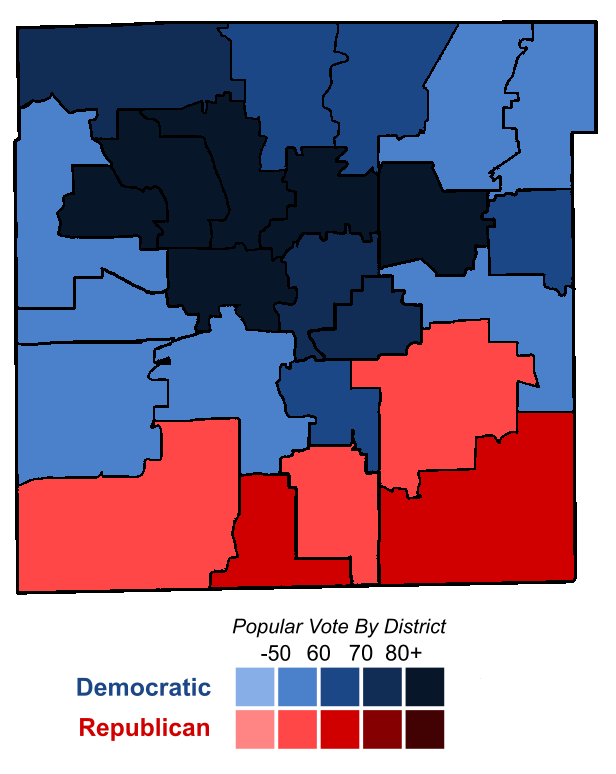
- Popular vote district

The 2019 Indianapolis City–County Council elections took place on November 5, 2019, with all 25 seats up for election. Before the elections Democrats held a 14–11-seat majority. Primaries for the council were held May 7, 2019. Following the elections Democrats expanded their control of the council with a 20–5 majority. This marked the first time in Indianapolis history that Democrats would hold a super majority on the council. In the Indianapolis mayoral election held at the same time, Democrat Joe Hogsett beat Republican Jim Merritt 72% to 27%.

== Results summary ==
Parties	Seats			Popular Vote		
Parties	2015	2019	Strength	Vote	Percent	Change
Democratic Party	13	20	80%	98,562	65.189%	+10.942%
Republican Party	12	5	20%	50,773	33.581%	-10.445%
Libertarian Party	0	0	0%	1,283	0.849%	-0.878%
Green Party	0	0	0%	75	0.050%	+0.050%
Independent Party	0	0	0%	501	0.331%	+0.331%
Totals	25	25	100%	151,194	100%	

=== Close races ===
Seats where the margin of victory was under 10%:

1. Council District 15, 1.2% gain
2. Council District 6, 3.0% gain
3. Council District 4, 4.4% gain
4. Council District 18, 5.8%
5. Council District 20, 7.0%
6. Council District 16, 7.9% gain
7. Council District 24, 9.4%
8. Council District 5, 9.8% gain

Other seats that flipped party control:

1. Council District 2, 23.4% gain
2. Council District 3, 28.2% gain

=== Results by district ===
City-County Council District 1
Party	Candidate	Votes	%	±%
Democratic	Leroy Robinson (incumbent)	5,154	72.4%	+11.0
Republican	Richard Anderson	1,967	27.6%	−11.0
Turnout		7,121	100%	
Democratic hold				

City-County Council District 2
Party	Candidate	Votes	%	±%
Democratic	Keith Potts	6,463	61.7%	+14.4
Republican	Colleen Fanning (incumbent)	4,007	38.3%	−10.8
Turnout		10.470	100%	
Democratic gain from Republican				

City-County Council District 3
Party	Candidate	Votes	%	±%
Democratic	Dan Boots	5,506	64.1%	+21.4
Republican	Dan Jones	3,088	35.9	−18.7
Turnout		8,594	100%	
Democratic gain from Republican				

City-County Council District 4
Party	Candidate	Votes	%	±%
Democratic	Ethan Evans	4,114	52.2%	+11.1
Republican	Mike McQuillen (incumbent)	3,762	47.8%	−11.1
Turnout		7,876	100%	
Democratic gain from Republican				

City-County Council District 5
Party	Candidate	Votes	%	±%
Democratic	Alison Brown	5,065	54.9%	+10.1
Republican	Adam Cox	4,167	45.1%	−10.1
Turnout		9,232	100%	
Democratic gain from Republican				

City-County Council District 6
Party	Candidate	Votes	%	±%
Democratic	Crista Carlino	3,268	51.5%	+12.3
Republican	Janice Shattuck McHenry (incumbent)	3,076	48.5%	−12.3
Turnout		6,344	100%	
Democratic gain from Republican				

City-County Council District 7
Party	Candidate	Votes	%	±%
Democratic	John Barth	7,025	87.2%	+15.5
Republican	Stu Rhodes	1,034	12.8%	−15.5
Turnout		8,059	100%	
Democratic hold				

City-County Council District 8
Party	Candidate	Votes	%	±%
Democratic	Monroe Gray, Jr (incumbent)	5,884	85.1%	+6.8
Republican	Patrick Midla	1,028	14.9%	−6.8
Turnout		6,912	100%	
Democratic hold				

City-County Council District 9
Party	Candidate	Votes	%	±%
Democratic	William Oliver (incumbent)	7,217	100%	+17.4
Turnout		7,217	100%	
Democratic hold				

City-County Council District 10
Party	Candidate	Votes	%	±%
Democratic	Maggie Lewis (incumbent)	3,057	88.2%	+8.1
Republican	Clancy Arnold	480	11.8%	−8.1
Turnout		3,537	100%	
Democratic hold				

City-County Council District 11
Party	Candidate	Votes	%	±%
Democratic	Vop Osili (incumbent)	5,096	88.8%	+2.2
Republican	Evan Shearin	643	11.2%	−2.2
Turnout		5,739	100%	
Democratic hold				

City-County Council District 12
Party	Candidate	Votes	%	±%
Democratic	Blake Johnson (incumbent)	4,043	72.5%	+12.9
Republican	Jerry Mahshie	1,337	24.0%	−10.5
Libertarian	Justin Harter	194	3.5%	−2.4
Turnout		5,574	100%	
Democratic hold				

City-County Council District 13
Party	Candidate	Votes	%	±%
Democratic	Keith Graves	4,887	88.4%	+4.2
Republican	Jay Thompson	643	11.6%	−4.2
Turnout		5,530	100%	
Democratic hold				

City-County Council District 14
Party	Candidate	Votes	%	±%
Democratic	La Keisha Jackson (incumbent)	2,956	67.2%	−13.5
Independent	Derris Ross	988	22.7%	+22.7
Republican	Karl Henry	445	10.1%	−9.2
Turnout		4,389	100%	
Democratic hold				

City-County Council District 15
Party	Candidate	Votes	%	±%
Democratic	Jessica McCormick	2,521	50.6%	+12.8
Republican	Andy Harris	2,464	49.4%	−8.0
Turnout		4,985	100%	
Democratic gain from Republican				

City-County Council District 16
Party	Candidate	Votes	%	±%
Democratic	Kristin Jones	1,721	52.8%	+9.4
Republican	Laura Giffel	1,464	44.9%	−11.7
Green	Mike Smith	75	2.3%	+2.3
Turnout		3,260	100%	
Democratic gain from Republican				

City-County Council District 17
Party	Candidate	Votes	%	±%
Democratic	Zach Adamson (incumbent)	4,641	79.1%	−5.5
Republican	Tom Sutton	637	10.9%	−4.5
Independent	Antonio Lipscomb	501	8.5%	+8.5
Libertarian	Paul Copeland	91	1.6%	+1.6
Turnout		5,870	100%	
Democratic hold				

City-County Council District 18
Party	Candidate	Votes	%	±%
Republican	Michael-Paul Hart	2,638	52.9%	−5.0
Democratic	Duane Ingram	2,345	47.1%	+5.0
Turnout		4,983	100%	
Republican hold				

City-County Council District 19
Party	Candidate	Votes	%	±%
Democratic	David Ray (incumbent)	3,674	59.1%	+7.0
Republican	Tony Mendez	2,545	40.9%	−7.0
Turnout		6,219	100%	
Democratic hold				

City-County Council District 20
Party	Candidate	Votes	%	±%
Republican	Jason Holliday (incumbent)	2,297	53.5%	−8.3
Democratic	Phil Webster	1,998	46.5%	+8.3
Turnout		4,295	100%	
Republican hold				

City-County Council District 21
Party	Candidate	Votes	%	±%
Democratic	Frank Mascari (incumbent)	3,269	62.7%	+2.6
Republican	Tyler Richardson	1,947	37.3%	−2.6
Turnout		5,216	100%	
Democratic hold				

City-County Council District 22
Party	Candidate	Votes	%	±%
Democratic	Jared Evans (incumbent)	2,133	58.5%	+4.4
Republican	Jason Richey	1,516	41.5%	−4.4
Turnout		3,649	100%	
Democratic hold				

City-County Council District 23
Party	Candidate	Votes	%	±%
Republican	Paul Annee	3,104	60.4%	−19.8
Democratic	Beverly McDermott-Piazza	2,038	39.6%	+39.6
Turnout		5,142	100%	
Republican hold				

City-County Council District 24
Party	Candidate	Votes	%	±%
Republican	Michael Dilk	2,801	54.7%	−45.3
Democratic	Ben Brown	2,322	45.3%	+45.3
Turnout		5,123	100%	
Republican hold				

City-County Council District 25
Party	Candidate	Votes	%	±%
Republican	Brian Mowery (incumbent)	3,755	63.4%	−2.8
Democratic	Justin Braun	2,165	36.6%	+9.5
Turnout		5,920	100%	
Republican hold				
