= Jesse Brown (Indiana politician) =

American politician

Member of the Indianapolis City-County Council from the 13th District
- Incumbent
- Assumed office January 1, 2024
- Preceded by: Zach Adamson

Personal details
- Born: 1986 (age 39–40) Somerville, New Jersey, U.S.
- Party: Socialist (2026–present)
- Other political affiliations: Democratic (until 2026); Democratic Socialists of America (formerly)
- Spouse: Mary Kate Dugan
- Education: Indiana University, Indianapolis

Jesse Brown (born 1986) is an American politician and former teacher from Indianapolis, Indiana currently serving on the Indianapolis City-County Council for the 13th District, representing portions of Downtown Indianapolis, Martindale–Brightwood, Near Northside, Near Eastside, Eastside, Christian Park and Irvington. On November 7, 2023, Brown was elected to the Indianapolis City-County Council with 78% of the total vote.

Brown, a former Democrat now affiliated with the Socialist Party of Indiana, was a member of the Indianapolis chapter of the Democratic Socialists of America, which endorsed him during the 2023 election. He had also been a member of Bread and Roses, a third camp Marxist caucus of the DSA.

== Education and early career ==
Brown graduated from Cathedral High School in 2004. In 2010 he graduated from Indiana University–Purdue University Indianapolis where he later received a bachelor's degree in cultural anthropology. He worked as a high school teacher at a charter school. Brown moved to his neighborhood approximately 15 years ago and currently works with nonprofit human services.

== Political activism and election ==
Brown formed and filed his Committee Organization for election on January 4, 2023 with the Marion County Clerk. In a video posted to X on January he announced his candidacy publicly. In April 2023 he spoke out against the appointment of Greg Hill over Nichelle Hayes as CEO of the Indianapolis Public Library.

While an outspoken supporter of labor, Brown's opponent Council Vice President Zach Adamson secured the endorsements of numerous labor organizations affiliated with the Indianapolis AFL-CIO. Adamson also earned the endorsement of the Indianapolis Chamber of Commerce. Brown's opponent gained the endorsements of several influential leaders in Indianapolis politics, including the former chairs of the Marion County Democratic Party; Joel Miller and Kate Sweeney Bell. Incumbent Prosecutor Ryan Mears, County Treasurer Barbara Lawrence, Assessor Joe O’Connor, Council President Vop Osili and Majority Leader Maggie Lewis also threw their support behind Adamson. Brown raised around $20,000, while Adamson raised approximately $77,000. Brown defeated Adamson in the May 2 primary election, securing 1,790 votes (55.94%).

Brown joined with sitting councilors and future councilors Andy Nielsen, Brienne Delaney and Nick Roberts to practice picket with Teamsters Local 135 during contract negotiations with United Parcel Service. Brown defeated Libertarian candidate Elizabeth Glass on the November 7 general election, securing 5,479 votes (77.79%).

Brown was assigned in 2024 to the committees on Environmental Sustainability, Municipal Corporations and Parks and Recreation.

Brown publicly called on Indianapolis Mayor Joe Hogsett to resign on August 7, following accusations of sexual misconduct against Hogsett's former chief of staff.

== Electoral history ==
=== 2023 ===
Democratic primary for Indianapolis City-County Council District 13
Party	Candidate	Votes	%
Democratic	Jesse Brown	1,790	55.94%
Democratic	Zach Adamson (Incumbent)	1,410	44.06%
Total votes		3,200	100.0%

Indianapolis City-County Council District 13
Party	Candidate	Votes	%
Democratic	Jesse Brown	5,479	77.79%
Libertarian	Elizabeth Glass	1,564	22.21%
Total votes		7,043	100.0%
Democratic hold			
