= Karlee Macer =

American politician from Indiana

Member of the Indiana House of Representatives from the 92nd district
- In office November 7, 2012 – November 4, 2020
- Preceded by: Phillip Hinkle
- Succeeded by: Renee Pack

Personal details
- Born: April 18, 1971 (age 55) Wayne Township, Indiana, U.S.
- Party: Democratic
- Spouse: Chad
- Occupation: Politician

Karlee Macer (born April 18, 1971) is a Democratic member of the Indiana House of Representatives, representing the 92nd district. Macer also works at a retirement community.
