= R. Michael Young =

American politician

Member of the Indiana Senate from the 35th district
- Incumbent
- Assumed office November 8, 2000
- Preceded by: Morris Mills

Member of the Indiana House of Representatives from the 92nd district
- In office November 4, 1992 – November 8, 2000
- Preceded by: Constituency established
- Succeeded by: Phillip D. Hinkle

Member of the Indiana House of Representatives from the 48th district
- In office November 5, 1986 – November 4, 1992
- Preceded by: Paul Burkley
- Succeeded by: Dean R. Mock

Personal details
- Born: May 14, 1951 (age 75) Indianapolis, Indiana, U.S.
- Party: Republican
- Children: 3
- Education: Indiana University South Bend (BA); Indiana University School of Law (JD)
- Occupation: Attorney

R. Michael Young (born May 14, 1951) is a Republican member of the Indiana Senate, representing the 35th District since his appointment in December 2000. He succeeded Morris Mills. He was elected to the Indiana House of Representatives in 1986. In 1992, Young was redistricted and was reelected to the 92nd district. Young previously served on the Marion County Board of Zoning Appeals from 1980 to 1982. He ran for the United States House of Representatives for Indiana's 4th Congressional District in 2002 and in 2010.

In 2025, Young was one of 19 state senators who voted in favor of redrawing Indiana's congressional districts to create two additional Republican-leaning seats, a move heavily promoted by President Donald Trump but ultimately defeated in the Senate.

In 2026, Young proposed a bill that would see Indiana use a firing squad to carry out executions.
