= Morris Mills =

American politician (1927–2024)

Member of the Indiana Senate from the 35th district
- In office November 8, 1972 – November 8, 2000
- Preceded by: Constituency established
- Succeeded by: R. Michael Young

Member of the Indiana House of Representatives from the 26th district
- In office November 6, 1968 – November 8, 1972
- Preceded by: Multi-member district
- Succeeded by: Multi-member district

Personal details
- Born: September 25, 1927 Indianapolis, Indiana, U.S.
- Died: October 14, 2024 (aged 97) Crawfordsville, Indiana, U.S.
- Party: Republican
- Spouse: Mary Ann
- Children: 3
- Education: Earlham College; Harvard University
- Occupation: Businessman, farmer
- Awards: Sagamore of the Wabash - 3 times

Morris H. Mills (September 25, 1927 – October 14, 2024) was an American politician from the state of Indiana. A Republican, he served in the Indiana General Assembly from 1968 to 2000.

Mills died in Crawfordsville, Indiana, on October 14, 2024, at the age of 97.
