= Phillip Hinkle =

American politician

Member of the Indiana House of Representatives from the 92nd district
- In office 2000-2012
- Preceded by: R. Michael Young
- Succeeded by: Karlee Macer

Personal details
- Born: December 25, 1946 (age 79) Peru, Indiana
- Party: Republican
- Spouse: Barbara
- Education: Indiana State University

Phillip D. "Phil" Hinkle (born December 25, 1946) is a former Republican member of the Indiana House of Representatives from Indianapolis, Indiana representing the 92nd District from 2000 to 2012. His district included the western third of Wayne and Pike Townships.

== Background ==
Hinkle earned a B.S. in Education in 1970 from Indiana State University and a master's degree in Political Science in 1978.

After having taught for three years at Ben Davis High School, he became Research Director for the Indianapolis City-County Council, a position he held for three years. In 1978, he was elected Wayne Township, Indiana Assessor, a position to which he was re-elected three times. In 1979 he earned an M.A. in political science in 1979 from Indiana State University.

In 1991, he became a realtor while running for the Indianapolis City-County Council.

He was elected and served on the council until November 2000 when he was elected to his first term in the Indiana House of Representatives.

== In the House ==
Hinkle was assigned to the House standing committees on the elections and apportionment, and on government and regulatory reform.

He voted for the state's constitutional amendment defining marriage as existing only between a man and a woman.

== Personal life ==
Hinkle is married to the former Barbara Conti; they have two children. He is employed full-time as the Coordinator of Community Partnerships with MSD of Wayne Township.

=== Sex scandal ===
In 2011 he was identified as the man who paid an 18-year-old man he found on craigslist for "a really good time". Hinkle then offered, “How about $80 for services rendered and if real satisfied, a healthy tip? That make it worth while?” The man stated that when they were in the hotel room, Hinkle "grabbed him in the rear, dropped his towel and sat down on the bed — naked." Terrified, the young man changed his mind about the sexual encounter, prompting Hinkle to offer him money and electronics as a bribe to keep quiet.

Several of his fellow GOP lawmakers debated whether Hinkle should resign. Governor Mitch Daniels called the situation a "family tragedy". Hinkle insists that he is not gay and will not resign, but will not run for office again.
