= Cherrish Pryor =

American politician from Indiana

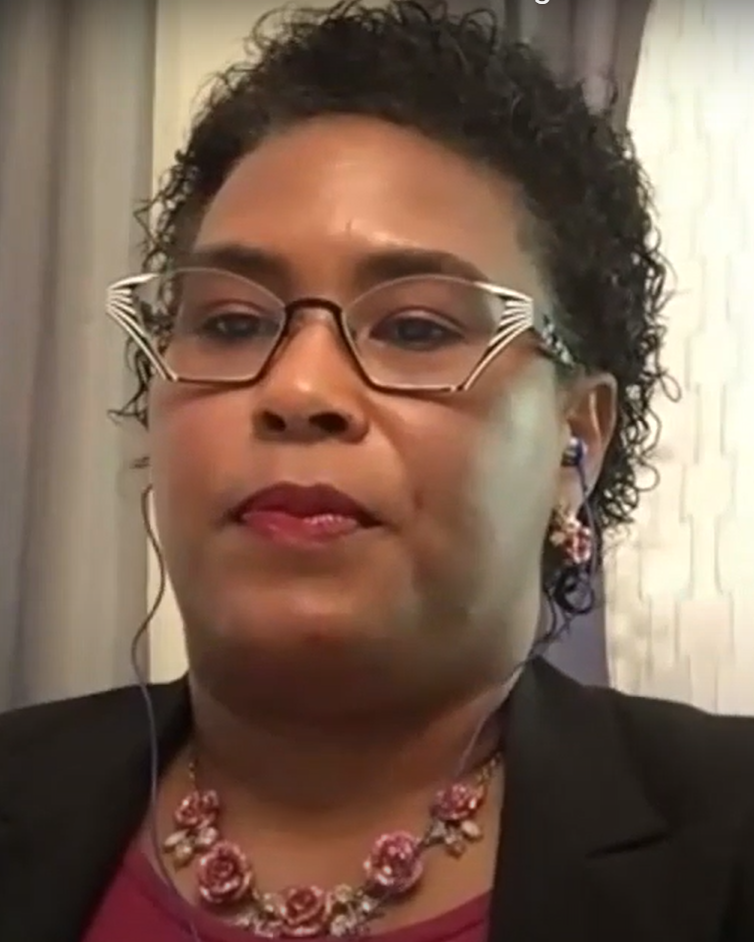

Democratic Floor Leader of the Indiana House of Representatives
- Incumbent
- Assumed office November 7, 2018

Member of the Indiana House of Representatives from the 94th district
- Incumbent
- Assumed office 2008
- Preceded by: Carolene Mays

Member of the Indianapolis City-County Council, District 7
- In office January 1, 2008 – November 4, 2008

Personal details
- Born: 1973 or 1974 (age 51–52) Holly Springs, Mississippi, U.S.
- Party: Democratic
- Education: Indiana University (BA); Indiana University Purdue University Indianapolis (MPA)

Cherrish Pryor (born 1973/1974) is an American politician from Indianapolis, Indiana. She is a Democratic member of the Indiana House of Representatives, representing the 94th District since 2008. She has served as the Democratic Floor Leader since 2018. The first African American to hold the leadership position. She is also Treasurer for the National Black Caucus of State Legislators. A role she has held since 2021 and was recently re-elected to serve another two-year term which will end in 2025.

Pryor began her political career as an Indianapolis City-County Council member, representing the 7th District from 2007 to 2008.

Pryor is a native of Holly Springs, Mississippi and has lived in Indiana since 1986. She graduated from South Side High School in Fort Wayne, Indiana in 1988. She holds a BA from Indiana University in Criminal Justice and a MPA from Indiana University Purdue University (IUPUI).

She moved to Indianapolis in 1995 to work for the Indiana House of Representatives as a legislative intern and was hired as a full-time legislative assistant within two months.

In 2023, Pryor received the Legislator of the Year award from the National Black Caucus of State Legislators.

== Electoral history ==
Indiana State House District 94 Democratic primary election, 2008
Party	Candidate	Votes	%
Democratic	Cherrish Pryor	11,478	91.2%
Democratic	Chad Miller	1,105	8.8%
Total votes		12,583	100.00%

Indiana State House District 94 election, 2008
Party	Candidate	Votes	%	±%
Democratic	Cherrish Pryor	19,178	77.5%	−22.5%
Republican	Chad Miller	5,571	22.5%	+22.5%
Total votes		24,749	100.00%	

Indiana State House District 94 election, 2010
Party	Candidate	Votes	%	±%
Democratic	Cherrish Pryor	9,983	75.3%	−2.2%
Republican	Clint Fultz	2,925	22.06%	−0.44%
Libertarian	Mike Smythe	350	2.64%	+2.64%
Total votes		13,258	100.00%	

Indiana State House District 94 election, 2012
Party	Candidate	Votes	%	±%
Democratic	Cherrish Pryor	21,663	96.6%	+21.3%
Socialist	Clint Fultz	752	3.4%	+3.4%
Total votes		22,415	100.00%	

Indiana State House District 94 election, 2014
Party	Candidate	Votes	%	±%
Democratic	Cherrish Pryor	8,859	100.0%	+4.4%
Total votes		8,859	100.00%	

Indiana State House District 94 election, 2016
Party	Candidate	Votes	%	±%
Democratic	Cherrish Pryor	21,416	100.0%	N/A
Total votes		21,416	100.00%	

Indiana State House District 94 election, 2018
Party	Candidate	Votes	%	±%
Democratic	Cherrish Pryor	18,056	100.0%	N/A
Total votes		18,056	100.00%	

Indiana State House District 94 election, 2020
Party	Candidate	Votes	%	±%
Democratic	Cherrish Pryor	21,430	85.5%	−14.5%
Republican	Felipe Rios	3,629	14.5%	+14.5%
Total votes		25,059	100.00%	

Indiana State House District 94 election, 2022
Party	Candidate	Votes	%	±%
Democratic	Cherrish Pryor	11,206	100.0%	+14.5%
Total votes		11,206	100.00%	

Indiana State House District 94 election, 2024
Party	Candidate	Votes	%	±%
Democratic	Cherrish Pryor	18,772	100.0%	N/A
Total votes		18,772	100.00%	
