= Indianapolis City-County Council =

Legislative body of Indianapolis and Marion County, Indiana

City-County Council of Indianapolis and Marion County
- City of Indianapolis

Type
- Type: Unicameral
- Term limits: None

History
- Founded: January 1, 1970
- Preceded by: Indianapolis Common Council
- New session started: January 1, 2024

Leadership
- President: Maggie Lewis (D)
- Vice President: John Barth (D)
- Majority Leader: Jared Evans (D)
- Minority Leader: Brian Mowery (R)
- Minority Whip: Paul Annee (R)

Structure
- Seats: 25
- Political groups: Majority (18) Democratic (18) Minority (7) Republican (6) Socialist (1)
- Length of term: 4 years

Elections
- Last election: November 7, 2023 (25 seats)
- Next election: November 2, 2027 (25 seats)

Meeting place
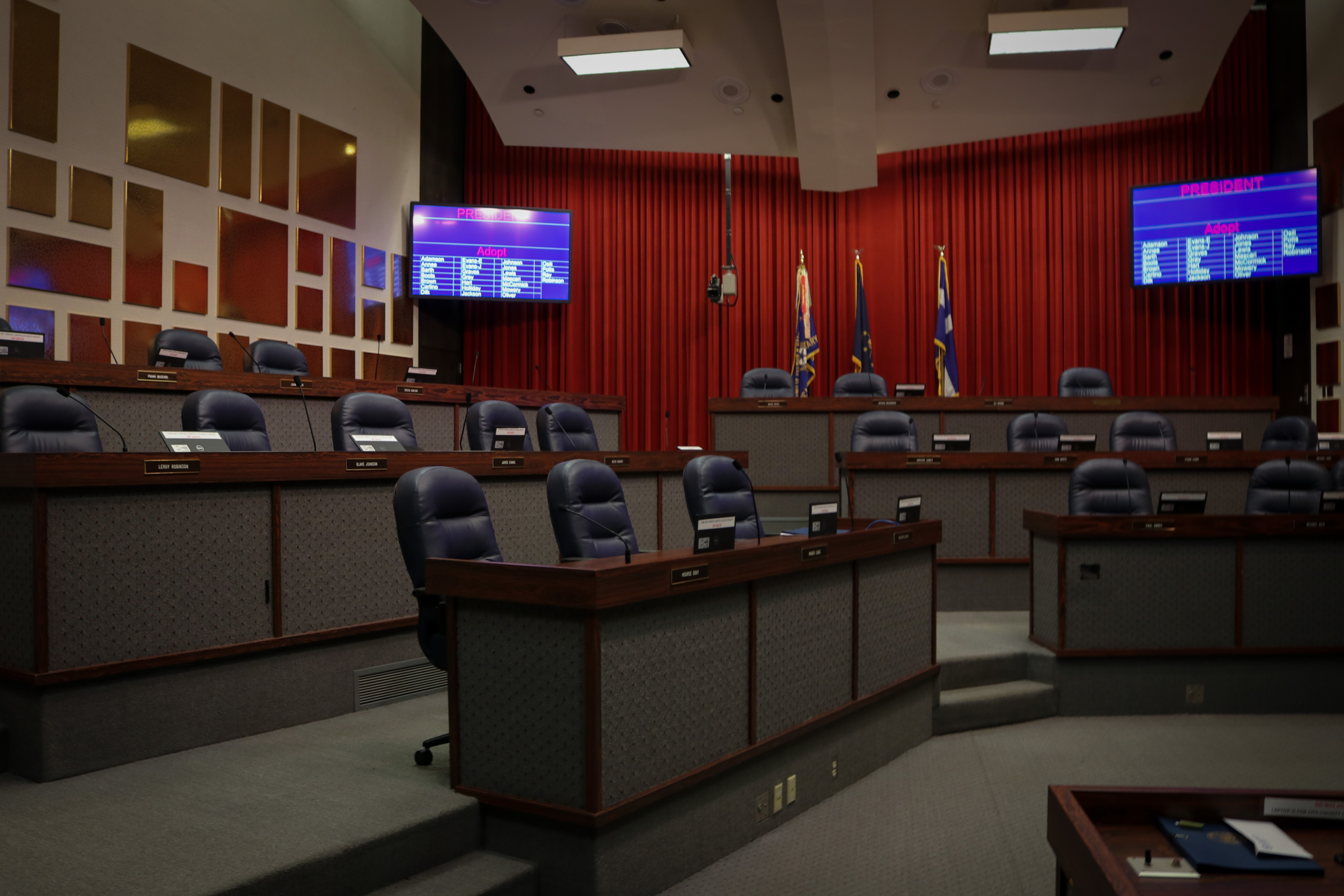
- Beurt R. SerVaas Public Assembly Room; City-County Building; 200 E. Washington St.

Website
- www.indy.gov/agency/city-county-council

The City-County Council of Indianapolis and Marion County is the legislative body of the combined government of the city of Indianapolis and the county of Marion in the state of Indiana. The council was established as part of the consolidation of city and county governments, enacted by Unigov on January 1, 1970.

The council is composed of 25 members elected to four-year renewable terms, each representing an electoral district. The council is responsible for reviewing and adopting budgets and appropriations. It can also enact, repeal, or amend ordinances, and make appointments to certain boards and commissions, among other duties. Council offices and the public assembly room are housed in the City-County Building.

== History ==
=== City Council (1832–1891) ===
Robert Bruce Bagby was elected as the city's first African American to serve on the Indianapolis City Council in 1877.

=== Common Council (1891–1970) ===
Nannette Dowd became the first woman elected to Indianapolis Common Council in the 1934 municipal election. Sumner Alexander Furniss was elected and served from 1917 to 1921.

=== City-County Council (1970–present) ===
Following the launch of Unigov on January 1, 1970, members of the former Indianapolis Common Council and the Marion County Council were combined to form the first City-County Council. The council was composed of 29 seats: 25 representing geographic districts and four at-large. The first City-County Council election occurred on November 2, 1971.

In the 2011 Indianapolis City-County Council election, Zach Adamson was elected as the first openly gay member of the council, representing District 17.

In April 2013, the Indiana General Assembly passed Senate Enrolled Act 621 which outlined several changes to city-county government, including eliminating the council's four at-large seats following the 2015 Indianapolis City-County Council election. The controversial bill was signed into law by Governor Mike Pence.

The 2019 Indianapolis election proved historic. Democrats flipped six Republican seats to earn the party's first supermajority since the council's creation in 1970. Ali Brown became the first openly queer-identifying woman to serve on the council, representing District 5. Along with the reelection of Adamson, Brown was joined by fellow newcomers Ethan Evans (District 4) and Keith Potts (District 2), respectively—the most LGBTQ members in the council's history.

Leading up to the 2023 municipal primary the Marion County Democratic Party announced the end of slating, a political process in which precinct committee persons endorsed candidates during a pre-primary convention. Candidates endorsed through the slating process were supported with party resources. In 2019, of the 24 electoral districts with contested Democratic primaries, 15 candidates were unopposed on the ballot. That year, all the incumbent councilors in both the Democratic and Republican primaries won their primary races.

In the 2023 Indianapolis election, the Republican Party gained one seat while the Democratic Party maintained its supermajority with 19 seats. During the Democratic primary, 11 candidates ran unopposed. Three incumbent Democratic councilors were defeated in the May primary. Jesse Brown, an endorsed member of the Democratic Socialists of America was elected (District 13). Nick Roberts, age 23, was elected to (District 4), making him the youngest elected official for any of the 50 largest American cities at the time.

In February 2026, Los Angeles-based company Metrobloks proposed building a data center in the Martindale-Brightwood neighborhood on the northeast side of the city of Indianapolis, but many residents strongly opposed this. On April 1, 2026, the city's Metropolitan Development Commission voted 6–2 to rezone the site so as to allow the construction to occur. The project included a $2.5 million commitment to support the neighborhood. However, at around 12:45 am on April 6, about a dozen shots were fired near one councilman's home and a note reading "NO DATA CENTERS" was left behind.

On May 4, 2026, the council introduced Proposal No. 158 which urges the Metropolitan Development Commission to implement a temporary stay on data center approvals. Sponsored by Councilor Jesse Brown, the proposal seeks a stay until May 7, 2027, or until new guidelines for data center projects are established.

== Composition ==
Map of Indianapolis City-County Council electoral districts since 2023

The Indianapolis City-County Council consists of 25 seats corresponding to 25 electoral districts apportioned by population throughout Marion County. Because the council is the legislative body for both the city and the county, residents of Marion County's four "excluded cities" (Beech Grove, Lawrence, Southport, and Speedway) are eligible to vote in council elections and are equally represented alongside Indianapolis residents. Every seat is up for reelection every four years. The head of the council is the council president who is elected by the majority party at the council's first meeting in January.

Following the 2019 elections, Democrats expanded their control of the council with a 20–5 majority. This marked the first time in Indianapolis history that Democrats have held a supermajority on the council. The clerk of the council is Yulonda Winfield.

=== Current members ===
Current composition of Indianapolis City-County Council
District	Councilor	Assumed office	Party
1	Leroy Robinson	January 1, 2016	Democratic
2	Brienne Delaney	January 1, 2024	Democratic
3	Dan Boots	January 1, 2020	Democratic
4	Nick Roberts	January 1, 2024	Democratic
5	Maggie Lewis	November 25, 2008 (Note: Marion County Democratic Party precinct committee members elected Lewis to complete the term of Cherrish Pryor. Pryor vacated the seat after her election to the Indiana House of Representatives.)	Democratic
6	Carlos Perkins	January 1, 2024	Democratic
7	John Barth	January 1, 2020	Democratic
8	Ron Gibson	January 1, 2024	Democratic
9	Keith Graves	June 14, 2019 (Note: Marion County Democratic Party precinct committee members elected Graves to complete the term of Stephen Clay following his resignation.)	Democratic
10	Shaila Mulholland	October 5, 2026 (Note: Marion County Democratic Party precinct committee members elected Mulholland to complete the term of Ali Brown following her resignation.)	Democratic
11	vacant (Note: Crista Wells resigned from the council effective October 31, 2026. Marion County Democratic Party precinct committee members have 30 days to elect a new councilor to complete her term.)		Democratic
12	Vop Osili	January 1, 2012	Democratic
13	Jesse Brown	January 1, 2024	Socialist
14	Andy Nielsen	January 1, 2024	Democratic
15	Rena Allen	May 16, 2024 (Note: Marion County Democratic Party precinct committee members elected Allen to complete the term of La Keisha Jackson. Jackson vacated the seat after her election to the Indiana Senate.)	Democratic
16	Jessica McCormick	January 1, 2020	Democratic
17	Jared Evans	January 1, 2016	Democratic
18	Kristin Jones	January 1, 2020	Democratic
19	Frank Mascari	January 1, 2012	Democratic
20	Michael-Paul Hart	January 1, 2020	Republican
21	Josh Masquelier	September 2, 2026 (Note: Marion County Republican Party precinct committee members elected Masquelier to complete the term of Josh Bain. Bain vacated the seat upon accepting an appointment to the Indiana Utility Regulatory Commission.)	Republican
22	Paul Annee	January 1, 2020	Republican
23	Derek Cahill	January 1, 2024	Republican
24	Michael Dilk	January 1, 2020	Republican
25	Brian Mowery	December 5, 2016	Republican

== Standing committees ==
Current composition of standing committees
Committee	Chair	Members
Committee on Committees	Maggie Lewis	Jared Evans; Brian Mowery
Administration and Finance	Frank Mascari; Andy Nielsen (Vice Chair)	Rena Allen; Paul Annee; John Barth; Dan Boots; Derek Cahill; Michael Dilk; Maggie Lewis; Brian Mowery; Carlos Perkins
Community Affairs	Nick Roberts	Rena Allen; Paul Annee; Ron Gibson; Keith Graves; Michael-Paul Hart; Josh Masquelier; Shaila Mulholland; Vop Osili
Education	Carlos Perkins	John Barth; Dan Boots; Jesse Brown; Derek Cahill; Keith Graves; Michael-Paul Hart; Josh Masquelier; Jessica McCormick; Shaila Mulholland
Environmental Sustainability	John Barth	Jesse Brown; Derek Cahill; Brienne Delaney; Michael Dilk; Michael-Paul Hart; Andy Nielsen; Carlos Perkins; Nick Roberts
Ethics	Jessica McCormick	Paul Annee; Michael-Paul Hart; Frank Mascari; Josh Masquelier; Carlos Perkins
Investigative	Crista Wells	Rena Allen; Josh Bain; Kristin Jones; Jessica McCormick; Brian Mowery; Andy Nielsen
Metropolitan and Economic Development	Vop Osili; Kristin Jones (Vice Chair)	Paul Annee; John Barth; Jesse Brown; Derek Cahill; Brienne Delaney; Jared Evans; Ron Gibson; Michael-Paul Hart; Maggie Lewis; Brian Mowery; Andy Nielsen; Nick Roberts; Leroy Robinson
Municipal Corporations	Jared Evans	Rena Allen; Jesse Brown; Michael Dilk; Ron Gibson; Keith Graves; Michael-Paul Hart; Kristin Jones; Josh Masquelier; Brian Mowery; Shaila Mulholland; Carlos Perkins
Parks and Recreation	Dan Boots	Paul Annee; Dan Boots; Jesse Brown; Brienne Delaney; Michael Dilk; Jared Evans; Frank Mascari; Josh Masquelier; Jessica McCormick
Public Safety and Criminal Justice	Leroy Robinson; Rena Allen (Vice Chair)	Paul Annee; Dan Boots; Derek Cahill; Brienne Delaney; Keith Graves; Michael-Paul Hart; Frank Mascari; Jessica McCormick; Brian Mowery; Carlos Perkins
Public Works	Kristin Jones	Dan Boots; Derek Cahill; Michael Dilk; Jared Evans; Ron Gibson; Josh Masquelier; Jessica McCormick; Brian Mowery; Andy Nielsen; Nick Roberts
Rules and Public Policy	Maggie Lewis	Paul Annee; John Barth; Dan Boots; Michael Dilk; Jared Evans; Kristin Jones; Josh Masquelier; Brian Mowery; Andy Nielsen; Leroy Robinson

== Salary ==
Members of the council earn an annual salary of $11,400, plus per diems of $112 per council meeting and $62 per committee meeting. Ordinance stipulates that annual base pay is capped at 12 percent of the mayor's salary ($95,000). In June 2022, councilors approved revisions to the ordinance for the first time in more than 20 years, increasing the annual salary to $31,075, in addition to per diems of $150 per council meeting and $75 per committee meeting. The ordinance will take effect in 2024, following the 2023 Indianapolis City-County Council election.

== Pertinent issues ==
- Scooters Removal/Regulations
- Addressing Potholes
- Improve Downtown
- BlueIndy
- Equity and Equality
- Council Pay Raise

== Former members ==
- Rozelle Boyd (1965–2007)
- Roger W. Brown (1972–1976)
- Paul Cantwell (1970–1979)
- Jeff Cardwell (2008–2013)
- André Carson (2007–2008)
- Ray Crowe (1984–1987)
- Aaron Freeman (2010–2016)
- Phillip Hinkle (1992–2000)
- Glenn L. Howard (1975–1992)
- La Keisha Jackson (2014–2024)
- Blake Johnson (2016–2020)
- Cherrish Pryor (2007–2008)
- John C. Ruckelshaus (1971–1975)
- Jack Sandlin (2010–2016)
- Scott Schneider (2000–2008)
- Beurt SerVaas (1961–2002)
- Jefferson Shreve (2013–2016, 2018–2020)
- Mike Speedy (2004–2010)

== See also ==
- Government of Indianapolis
- List of mayors of Indianapolis
