= Martindale–Brightwood =

Neighborhood in Indianapolis, Indiana, US

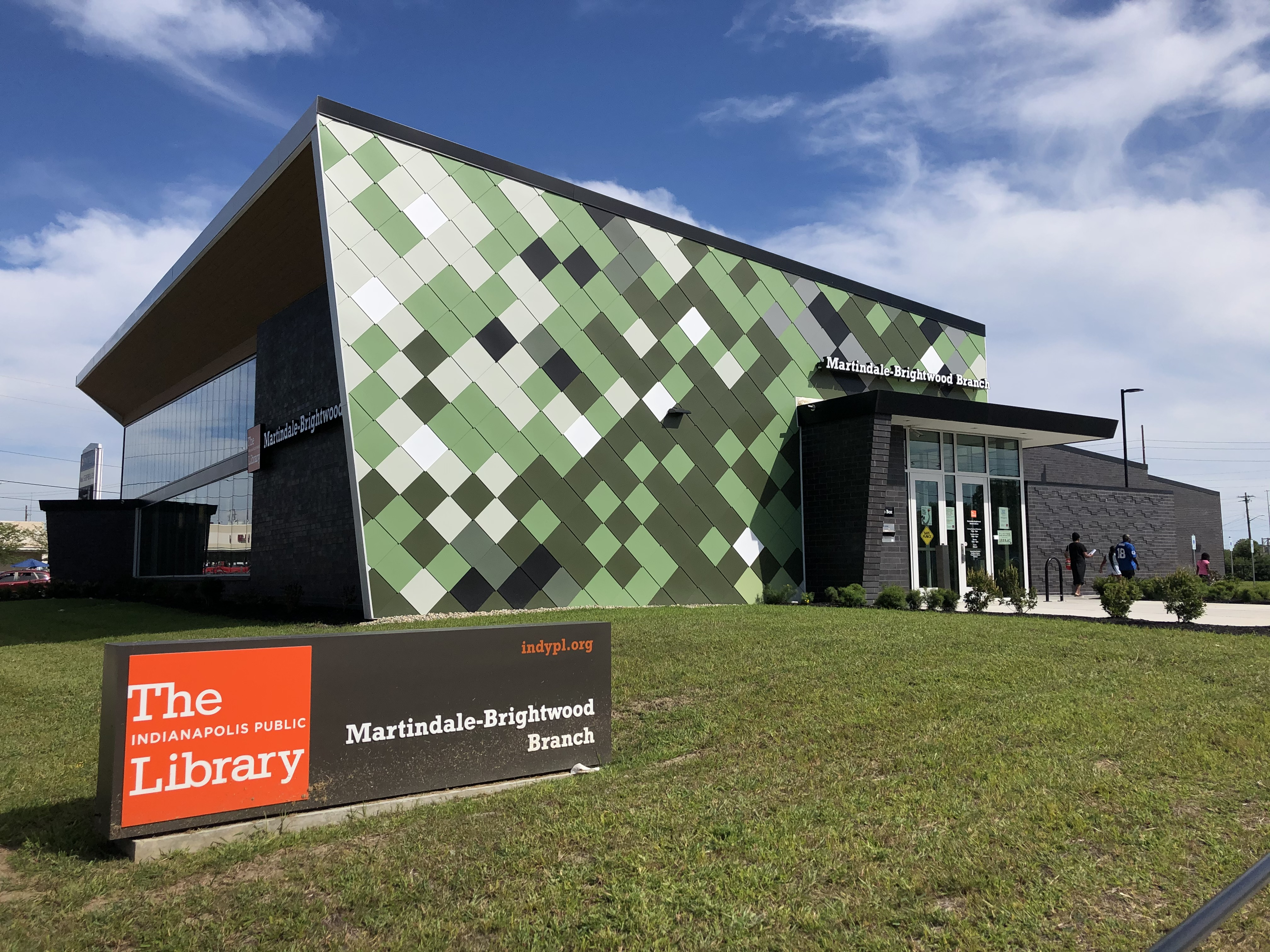
Martindale-Brightwood Branch of the Indianapolis Public Library

Martindale–Brightwood is a historic neighborhood located on the near northeast side of Indianapolis, Indiana. It is bounded by 30th Street, Massachusetts Avenue, 21st Street, Sherman Drive, the Norfolk Southern Railroad tracks, and the Monon Trail.

== History ==
=== Before merger (1872–1992) ===
Martindale-Brightwood is a combination of two originally distinct neighborhoods, Martindale and Brightwood, both dating back to the 1870s and both being defined early-on by their proximity to railroads. It is one of Indianapolis' oldest neighborhoods.

The Sherman Drive-In Theater, which was located in the Martindale-Brightwood area at 2505 North Sherman Drive, opened in 1965 and closed about eighteen years later in June 1983. The abandoned lot spanned about thirteen acres.

==== Brightwood ====
Brightwood was platted in 1872 and incorporated as an independent municipality in 1876. Founding members of the municipality included Clements A. Greenleaf (manufacturer), John L. Mothershead (manufacturer), William D. Wiles (merchant), and Daniel H. Wiles (merchant). Before its annexation by Indianapolis in 1897, Brightwood developed into a small town. In 1889 it housed nearly 4,900 Hoosiers. Brightwood was initially a thriving railroad center populated by mostly white immigrants, many of which were first-generation Americans born in Germany and Ireland.

==== Martindale ====
Martindale was established in 1873 by Frederick Ruschaupt and Gustave Zschech. It was originally a blue collar community populated by a significant portion of the city's African American population, who inhabited the area as a result of forced segregation in the 1800s. The area was neither an independent municipality like Brightwood, nor did it house as many commercial properties. Many of the neighborhood's initial residents worked at companies along the Monon Railroad, including: Atlas Engine Works, Eaglesfield Lumber, Indianapolis Gas Works, Indianapolis Veneer Company, the National Motor Vehicle Company, and Thomas & Skinner Steel Projects.

=== After merger (1992–present) ===
Martindale and Brightwood were linked to one another in 1992 with the formation of the Martindale-Brightwood Community Development Corporation.

In September 2025, Metrobloks, a Los Angeles-based developer, proposed building a data center in on the site of the former Sherman Drive-In Theater. A community meeting was held on February 2, 2026, though some residents opposed the proposal. Still more residents opposed the idea at a subsequent February 10 community meeting, with one resident calling for "honest conversations about contamination and infrastructure impacts and risks". However, on April 1, 2026, the Metropolitan Development Commission of the Indianapolis City-County Council approved the project. The developer also pledged to invest $2.5 million into neighborhood infrastructure.

== Layout ==
Several public and private facilities can be found within Martindale-Brightwood. These include: the Brightwood Community Center, Martin University, the Juvenile Detention Center, the Edna Martin Christian Center, three public elementary schools, one fire station, five public parks, Genesis Plaza, and close to 100 churches.

== Popular culture ==
In 2006, journalist Kim Hood Jacobs wrote and produced Reviving the Spirit: the story of Martindale Brightwood for WFYI. The story focused on the determination of residents to combat lingering issues in the Martindale-Brightwood community (increased crime, environmental contamination, poverty).

In June 2016, Martindale-Brightwood was recognized by Mayor Joe Hogsett for the neighborhood's commitment to redevelopment.

The Martindale-Brightwood neighborhood is a prominent feature in the Harrison Center's 2021 film Rasheeda's Freedom Day, which recreates the harrowing story of long-time resident JoAnna LeNoir.

== Demographics ==
Martindale-Brightwood has a population of 12,578 residents. The residents are predominantly African American and the median age is 37 years old.

== See also ==
- List of African-American neighborhoods
- List of neighborhoods in Indianapolis
