= History of Indianapolis =

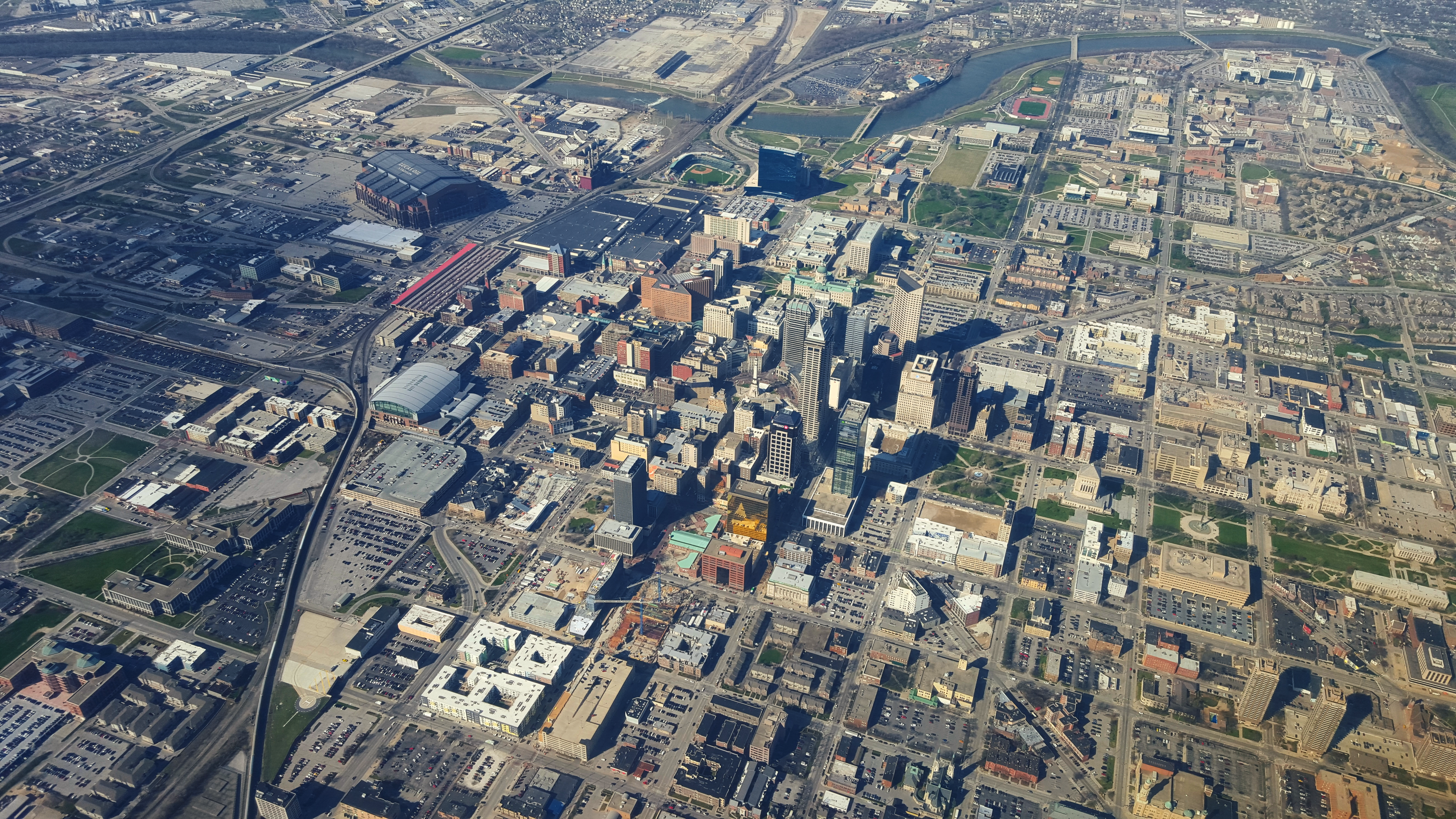
Downtown Indianapolis from the air in 2016.

The history of Indianapolis spans three centuries. Founded in 1820, the area where the city now stands was originally home to the Lenape (Delaware Nation). In 1821, a small settlement on the west fork of the White River at the mouth of Fall Creek became the county seat of Marion County, and the state capital of Indiana, effective January 1, 1825. Initially the availability of federal lands for purchase in central Indiana made it attractive to the new settlement; the first European Americans to permanently settle in the area arrived around 1819 or early 1820. In its early years, most of the new arrivals to Indianapolis were Europeans and Americans with European ancestry, but later the city attracted other ethnic groups. The city's growth was encouraged by its geographic location, 2 miles (3.2 km) northwest of the state's geographic center. In addition to its designation as a seat of government, Indianapolis's flat, fertile soil, and central location within Indiana and the Midwest, helped it become an early agricultural center. Its proximity to the White River, which provided power for the town's early mills in the 1820s and 1830s, and the arrival of the railroads, beginning in 1847, established Indianapolis as a manufacturing hub and a transportation center for freight and passenger service. An expanding network of roads, beginning with the early National Road and the Michigan Road, among other routes, connected Indianapolis to other major cities.

Alexander Ralston and Elias Pym Fordham surveyed and designed the original grid pattern for the new town of Indianapolis, which was platted in 1821. Ralston's plan extended outward from Governor's Circle, now called Monument Circle, a large circular commons at the center of town. The early grid is still evident at the center of downtown Indianapolis, although the city has expanded well beyond its original boundaries. When White River proved too shallow for steamboats and the Indiana Central Canal was never fully completed, railroads helped transform the city into a business, industrial, and manufacturing center. The city remains the seat of state government and a regional center for banking and insurance, which were established early in the town's history. As early as the 1820s and 1830s, the city's residents established numerous religious, cultural, and charitable organizations to address social concerns and to preserve the state's history and culture.

== Early settlement (prior to 1820) ==
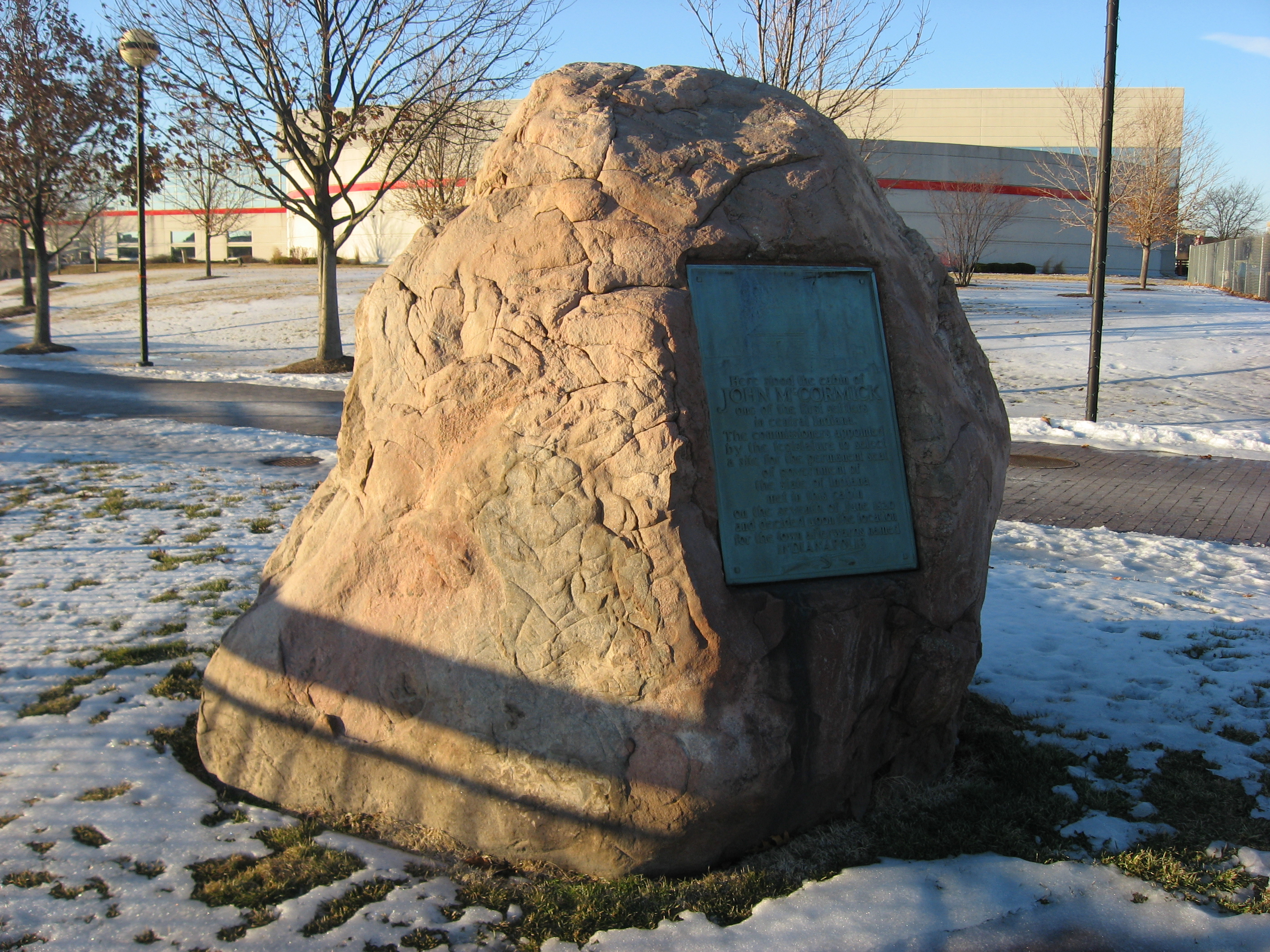
Marker at the site of John McCormick's cabin

Indianapolis was founded as the site for the new state capital in 1820 by an act of the Indiana General Assembly; however, the area where the city of Indianapolis now stands was once home to the Lenape (Delaware Nation), a native tribe who lived along the White River. The flat, heavily wooded area supplied them with ample food and wild game, although part of the area was swampy and poorly drained. The White River and Fall Creek also offered water access and good fishing, but the Natives established no permanent settlement in the immediate area; however, they did set up temporary camps, especially along the waterways.

Under the Northwest Ordinance (1787), the Northwest Territory was created from land within the boundaries of the United States lying west of the Appalachian Mountains and northwest of the Ohio River. This area included present-day Indiana. In 1800 a large portion of land extending west from the Ohio border to the Mississippi River and north to the United States border with Canada was established as the Indiana Territory. As Indiana slowly progressed toward statehood, its territorial boundaries were reduced to establish the Michigan Territory (1805) and the Illinois Territory (1809). In 1816, the year Indiana became a state, the U.S. Congress donated four sections of federal land to establish a permanent seat of state government. Two years later, under the Treaty of St. Mary's (1818), the Delaware relinquished title to their tribal lands in central Indiana and agreed to leave the area by 1821. This tract of land, which was called the New Purchase, included the site selected for the new state capital in 1820.

The availability of new federal lands for purchase in central Indiana attracted settlers, many of them descendants of families from northwestern Europe. Although many of these first European and American settlers were Protestants, a large proportion of the early Irish and German immigrants were Catholics. Few African Americans lived in central Indiana before 1840. The first European Americans to permanently settle in the area that became Indianapolis were either the McCormick or Pogue families. The McCormicks are generally considered to be the town's first permanent settlers; however, some historians believe George Pogue, his wife, and their five children may have arrived first, on March 2, 1819, and settled in a log cabin along the creek that was later called Pogue's Run. Other historians have argued as early as 1822 that John Wesley McCormick and his family, along with his brothers, James and Samuel, and their employees became the first European American settlers when he built a cabin along the White River in February 1820.

== Site selection and town plan ==
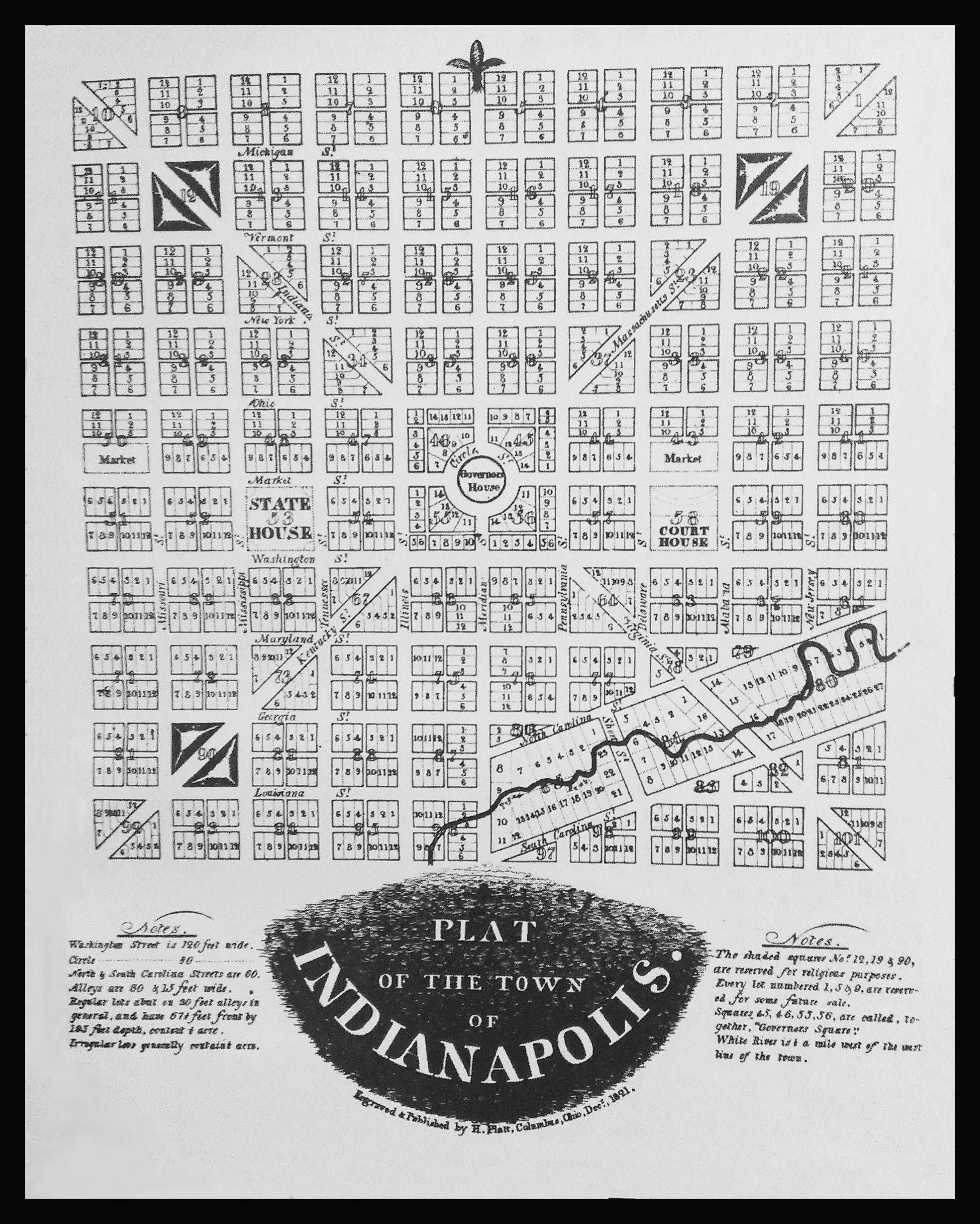
Plat of the Town of Indianapolis from December 1821

On January 11, 1820, the Indiana General Assembly authorized a committee of ten commissioners to select a site in central Indiana for the new state capital. The state legislature appointed Alexander Ralston and Elias Pym Fordham to survey and design a town plan for Indianapolis, which was platted in 1821. Ralston had been a surveyor for the French architect Pierre L'Enfant, and assisted him in laying out the plan for Washington, D.C. Ralston's original plan for Indianapolis called for a town of 1-square-mile (2.6 km^{2}). Nicknamed the Mile Square, the town was bounded by North, East, South, and West Streets, although they were not named at that time, with Governor's Circle, a large circular commons, at the center of town. Governor's Circle later became known as Monument Circle, after the impressive 284-foot-tall (86.5-meter-tall) neoclassical limestone and bronze Soldiers' and Sailors' Monument, designed by German architect Bruno Schmitz, was completed on the site in 1901.

Under Ralston's plan, Governor's Circle was reserved as the future site of the governor's residence. Although a brick governor's mansion was erected in the site in 1827, its prominent and conspicuous location lacked privacy and no governor ever lived there. In 1839, the state legislature appropriated funds to purchase another home in Indianapolis to serve as the official governor's residence. The mansion on Governor's Circle was used as office space for the Indiana Supreme Court and a state bank, temporary housing for the Indiana State Library, lodging for state government officials, and a site for community gatherings before it was sold and finally demolished in 1857.

Ralston's grid pattern with wide roads and public squares extended outward from the four blocks adjacent to the Circle, and also included four diagonal streets, later renamed as avenues. Public squares were reserved for government and community use, but not all of these squares were used for this intended purpose. Ralston altered the grid pattern in the southeast quadrant to accommodate the flow of Pogue's Run, but a plat created in 1831 changed his original design and established a standard grid there as well.

Ralston's basic street plan is still evident at the center of Indianapolis, although the city has expanded well beyond its original boundaries. Streets in the original plat were named after states that were part of the United States when Indianapolis was initially planned, in addition to Michigan, which was a U.S. territory at that time. (Tennessee and Mississippi Streets were renamed Capitol and Senate Avenues in 1895, after several state government buildings, including the Indiana Statehouse, were built west of the Circle.) There are a few other exceptions to the early street names. The National Road, which eventually crossed Indiana into Illinois, passes through Indianapolis along Washington Street, a 120-foot-wide, east–west street one block south of the Circle. Meridian and Market Streets intersect the Circle. Few street improvements were made in the 1820s and 1830s; sidewalks did not appear until 1839 or 1840.

Once the initial town plat was finalized, the land was divided into lots, with the first ones offered for sale on October 8, 1821. A portion of the funds from the lot sales was set aside to create a public building fund that was used to construct a statehouse, a courthouse, the state clerk's office, and residences and offices for the governor and the state treasurer. Initially, there were no plans to plat the area outside the Mile Square, but later, additional tracts of land were divided into irregular-sized blocks and lots.

== Early development (1820–1860) ==
Indianapolis has been closely linked to politics since its selection as Indiana's seat of government in the 1820s, but early in its history the city became a railroad transportation hub for the region and a center for civic and cultural affairs.

=== Early government ===
Indianapolis became a seat of county government on December 31, 1821, when Marion County, Indiana, was established. A combined county and town government continued until 1832, when Indianapolis was incorporated as a town and the local government was placed under the direction of five elected trustees. Indianapolis became an incorporated city effective March 30, 1847. Samuel Henderson, the city's first mayor, led the new city government, which included a seven-member city council. In 1853, voters approved a new city charter that provided for an elected mayor and a fourteen-member city council. The city charter continued to be revised as Indianapolis expanded.

Effective January 1, 1825, the seat of state government relocated to Indianapolis from Corydon, Indiana, and the Indiana General Assembly's first session in the new state capital began on January 10, 1825. In addition to state government offices, a U.S. district court was established at Indianapolis in 1825; two years later, the state legislature appropriated $500 for construction of a new building in Indianapolis to house the Indiana Supreme Court.

In its early years Indianapolis hosted numerous political gatherings and visiting dignitaries. In 1828, Indiana supporters of John Quincy Adams's candidacy for president of the United States held their state convention in Indianapolis; in 1833, William Henry Harrison, former governor of the Indiana Territory, attended a reception held in his honor; in 1840, the country's first Whig convention met at Indianapolis; and, in 1842, former U.S. president Martin Van Buren and Kentucky politician Henry Clay visited the city. In 1851, the Indiana Constitutional Convention was held at the newly completed Indianapolis Masonic Temple, and, in 1856, the Indiana Republican Party held its first state convention in Indianapolis. Abraham Lincoln made his first visit to the city in 1859.

=== Public health and safety ===
Military protection, law enforcement, fire safety, and public health were addressed early in the city's history. Some of these efforts were undertaken with federal assistance, while others were established locally, in some cases on a volunteer basis.

In 1822, a federal militia was organized for central Indiana, and, in 1826, Indianapolis's first rifle and artillery companies were formed. Its first cavalry company was organized two years later. Several more militia companies were established in the 1850s. Enforcement of town ordinances and fire protection were also early concerns for residents. Indianapolis's first two justices of the peace were appointed in 1821, and its first jail was built in 1822. The city council established Indianapolis's first police department in 1854. The Indianapolis Fire Company, organized in 1826, was the town's first volunteer fire department. Indianapolis's first firehouse was built in 1836. The volunteer fire companies disbanded in 1859, when Indianapolis's first regular, paid fire department was established.

Because of Indianapolis's location near the White River and Fall Creek, its low-lying areas were subject to flooding. Twenty-five fatalities were reported after heavy rains fell during the summer months in 1821, a series of severe spring storms flooded the town's waterways in 1824, and record flooding occurred again in 1828. Heavy rains caused record flooding in 1847. Spring rains once again flooded Pogue's Run and the White River in 1857, although high-water marks did not reach the 1847 level. In 1860, a tornado passed through Indianapolis, but the most significant destruction occurred east and west of the city.

Poor drainage and sanitation in Indianapolis's early days contributed to the spread of illness and disease. Mosquitoes infected settlers with malaria and the town's first cases of influenza, cholera, and smallpox arrived in the 1820s and early 1830s. To combat these illnesses the Indiana Central Medical Society formed in 1823 to license physicians, town officials appointed its first board of health in 1831, and, in 1848, the Indiana Central Medical College organized. Indianapolis became home to the Indiana Hospital for the Insane in 1847, when its main building was completed. City Hospital's first building was completed in 1859, but it did not have sufficient funds to purchase equipment and remained vacant until 1861, when it served as a military hospital during the American Civil War. Indianapolis's first cemetery was established near the White River in 1821, the adjacent Union Cemetery in 1834, and Greenlawn Cemetery was added west of Union Cemetery in 1860. A Hebrew cemetery was established 3 miles (4.8 km) south of the city's center in 1856, and land for a Catholic cemetery was acquired south of the city in 1860.

=== Early transportation ===
Indianapolis was founded on the White River under an incorrect assumption that it would serve as a major transportation artery, but the river was difficult to navigate and too shallow during much of the year, especially for steamboats. After the steamboat Robert Hanna ran aground along the White River in 1831, no steamboat successfully returned to the capital city. Flatboats continued to transport goods along a portion of the river until new dams impeded their ability to navigate its waters. A horse-drawn barge canal was used to bypass the river to bring goods into the city through the mid-19th century.

The state's Mammoth Improvement Act (1836) brought the promise of canal transportation to Indianapolis, but it was never fully completed. The Indiana General Assembly began with the goal of connecting the Wabash and Erie Canal to the Ohio River. For the central Indiana segment of the canal system, the state legislature appropriated $3.5 million to construct the Indiana Central Canal, one of eight major infrastructure projects authorized under the Internal Improvement Act. The Central Canal was intended to run 296 miles (476 km), connecting the Wabash River from near Logansport, Indiana, to the White River, and pass through Indianapolis, before continuing south to Evansville, Indiana. Gangs of construction workers, mostly Irish, began digging the canal in 1836, but work halted after the state government went bankrupt in 1839. Central Canal was partially completed in Marion County, but it never connected to other canals. Only 7 miles (11 km) to 9 miles (14 km) of the canal that connected Indianapolis to the village of Broad Ripple to the north was opened for traffic. Later, a portion of Central Canal adjoining the White River was converted into White River State Park.

Road construction proved to be more successful than the state's canal system. While the city lies on the National Road, old east–west road from Cumberland, Maryland, that crossed Indiana and extended west to Illinois, reached Indianapolis in 1837. Beginning in 1838, stagecoach service connected Indianapolis to Cincinnati, Dayton, and Columbus, Ohio. The first major roads connected Indianapolis to Fort Wayne, Indiana, in 1825; to Crawfordsville, Indiana, in 1828; and to Lafayette, Indiana, in 1829. In 1828 the state legislature authorized construction of the Michigan Road, which passed through Indianapolis.

Although the state legislature appropriated $1.3 million to build rail lines from Madison, Indiana, to Lafayette, Indiana, as part of the Mammoth Internal Improvement Act in 1836, the Madison and Indianapolis, the first steam railroad in Indiana, did not arrive in Indianapolis until October 1, 1847. By 1850 eight rail lines reached the city, ending its isolation from the rest of the country and ushering in a new era of growth. In the 1850s Indianapolis became a transportation hub for the region, which helped improve the city's commercial trade, increase property values, and encourage further development. Indianapolis's first Union railroad depot, the first of its kind in the United States to serve competing railroads, opened in 1853. Rail transportation spurred further improvements to city streets. In 1853 several blocks of Washington Street were the first in the city to be illuminated with gaslight street lamps; in 1859 a section between Illinois and Meridian Streets became the city's first roadways to be paved with cobblestones.

=== Early commerce and industry ===
In the town's early years manufactured goods were brought overland by wagons or along the White River by keelboats and flatboats, but much of the local produce was not exported to markets outside Indianapolis until railroads began passing through in the city in the 1850s. Most of Indianapolis's early merchants set up businesses along Washington Street, the town's main street, but its first market house was built north of the courthouse in 1833. Subsequent structures on the site became known as the Indianapolis City Market. Agricultural production remained an important part of Indianapolis's early history. The Marion County Agricultural Society was organized in 1825, and the Marion County Board of Agriculture and the Indiana State Board of Agriculture were established in 1835. The first Marion County fair was held on October 30–31, 1835, and the first Indiana State Fair was held on the grounds of what became known as Military Park, west of downtown, in October 1852.

Until the arrival of the first railroads in 1847, few mills and manufacturing facilities were established in Indianapolis. One of the town's earliest gristmills, built in 1821, was a predecessor to the Acme-Evans Company. The Indianapolis Steam Mill Company, the town's first incorporated business, completed a new mill along the White River in 1831, but it closed in 1835. Other early industrial enterprises included a sawmill, flourmill, and a wool-carding factory. The Indianapolis Foundry, the town's first, began operations in 1833; the Indianapolis Brewery, another first for the town, was established the following year. With improved rail transportation in the 1850s, factory-made goods became more readily available in Indianapolis, and new factories were built in addition to several beef- and pork-packing plants. Iron manufacturing also expanded in the city, and a new brass foundry and a coppersmith arrived in the mid-1850s. Indianapolis's first gasworks was completed in 1851, and the Indianapolis Gas Light and Coke Company began supplying city residents with natural gas for lighting in early 1852, but natural gas usage was slow to expand in the city.

Banking and insurance institutions formed early in the town's history, but the first ones did not last long. The State Bank of Indiana, chartered in 1834, established its main office and one of its first 16 branch locations in Indianapolis, but its charter lapsed in 1858. The Bank of the State of Indiana, chartered in 1855, began operations in 1857. Several building and loan companies also organized in Indianapolis in the 1850s, but they were unsuccessful and closed. Indianapolis Insurance Company, the town's first insurance company, was chartered in 1836, but it suspended operations by 1860, and reorganized into a new company in 1865.

=== Religious groups ===
Baptists, Presbyterians, and Methodists established Indianapolis's first religious congregations in the 1820s, but other groups including the Episcopalians, Disciples of Christ, Lutherans, Catholics, Congregationalists, Society of Friends (Quakers), Universalists, Unitarians, and Jewish congregations were established in Indianapolis before the Civil War. Many of Indianapolis's early religious buildings have been demolished, but several of the congregations continue to exist, although some have been renamed or relocated to newer facilities.

Indianapolis's first Baptist congregation, organized in 1822, built the First Baptist Church. Presbyterians formed four of its early congregations in the city prior to the Civil War: First Presbyterian Church (1823), Second Presbyterian Church (1838), Third Presbyterian Church (1851), and Fourth Presbyterian Church (1851). Methodists organized three early Indianapolis congregations: Wesley Chapel (1822), Roberts Chapel (1842), and Strange Chapel (1845). The city's other early congregations included the first Disciples of Christ congregation, organized in 1833; Holy Cross Parish (1837), Indianapolis's oldest Catholic parish; Christ Church (1937); the First English Lutheran Church (1837); the United Brethren Church (1844); the first United Brethren in Christ congregation (1850); First Friends Church of Indianapolis (1854); the Indianapolis Hebrew Congregation (1856); and Plymouth Congregational Church (1857), among others. An early Universalist Church Society was established in 1844, but soon disbanded, and a subsequent congregation erected the city's First Universalist Church (1860). Indianapolis's liberal-minded Unitarians organized in 1860.

Indianapolis's early African American and German communities established their own congregations. The town's oldest African Methodist Episcopal Church congregation organized in 1836. Second Baptist Church (1846) became Indianapolis's first Baptist congregation for African Americans. Indianapolis's Germans established several German-speaking congregations: Zion Church (1841), the city's first German Evangelical congregation; Saint Paul's Evangelical Lutheran Church (1844); First German Methodist Episcopal Church (1849); First German Reformed Church of Indianapolis (1852); and Saint Marienkirche (1856), the city's first German-language Catholic parish.

=== Early schools and civic organizations ===
Beginning in the 1820s local residents and religious groups established Indianapolis's first private schools, but free public schools did not arrive until the 1840s. Indianapolis voters approved taxes to support free public schools in 1847, but operations were suspended after the Indiana Supreme Court declared the local taxes were unconstitutional in 1857; the city's public schools did not reopen until 1861.

Although local funding limited the expansion of free public schools prior to the Civil War, private and state-funded institutions continued to support educational opportunities in Indianapolis. In 1844 the state government took over responsibility for William Willard's private school for the deaf, established in 1843, and renamed it the Indiana State Asylum for the Deaf and Dumb. The Indiana Institute for the Education of the Blind opened in Indianapolis in 1847. North Western Christian University, chartered in 1850 and renamed Butler University in 1877, opened for its first classes in 1855. Indianapolis's German-English School was founded in 1859, the same year the Sisters of Providence of Saint Mary-of-the-Woods established Saint John's Academy for Girls, the city's first Catholic school.

Indianapolis residents also established several new philanthropic and cultural institutions. While the Marion County Temperance Society (1828), the Indianapolis Benevolent Society (1835), and the Indianapolis Widows and Orphans Friends' Society (1851), addressed the town's early social concerns, the Indiana State Library (1825) and the Indiana Historical Society (1830) were formed to preserve state and local history. Early residents also had access to public lecture halls and the city's first libraries. By the early 1850s Indianapolis also had several new gathering places, including the Grand Lodge of the Free Masons, the city's first public hall; a new Odd Fellows Hall; the first Bates House hotel; and a Young Men's Christian Association. Local entertainment included musical concerts, theatrical performances, and art exhibitions. During the 1850s the city's German community established the first of several German clubs and cultural societies. The Indianapolis Turngemeinde (1851) or Turners, merged with other German clubs and became known as the Indianapolis Social Turnverein. The Indianapolis Maennerchor (1854) is the city's oldest German-language musical club. The Western Association of Writers was founded in Indianapolis in 1886.

=== Early news reports ===
Beginning in the 1820s numerous newspapers were established in Indianapolis to report local, state, and national events. The town's earliest newspapers included the Indianapolis Gazette (1822); the Western Censor and Emigrant's Guide (1823), which became the Indianapolis Journal (1825); the Indiana Democrat (1830); the Daily Sentinel (1841), Indianapolis's first daily newspaper; the Indiana Freeman (1844), an antislavery newspaper; and The Locomotive (1845). Over the next few decades some of these publications merged, others discontinued operations, and new ones arrived on the scene. A few local newspapers served the city's German-speaking population, including Das Indiana Volksblatt (Indiana Volksblatt), which began publication in 1848, and the Freie Presse von Indiana, a weekly German-language newspaper that began publication in 1853.

In addition to newspaper reports, details of Indianapolis's early history are documented in the diary of Calvin Fletcher, a prominent early resident who was active in the town's civic and business affairs. Fletcher's diary remains a key resource for the study of early Indiana and Indianapolis history. His diary entries, which date from 1817 to 1835, recorded daily events; Fletcher's perspectives on law, business, and agriculture; and details of early Indianapolis railroads, banks, schools, and the charitable institutions in which he was involved. Fletcher's original diaries are housed the Indiana Historical Society's William Henry Smith Memorial Library Collection. The Diary of Calvin Fletcher, published by the Indiana Historical Society in nine volumes, provides a detailed, first-hand account of life in Indianapolis during its first forty-five years.

== Civil War era (1861–1865) ==
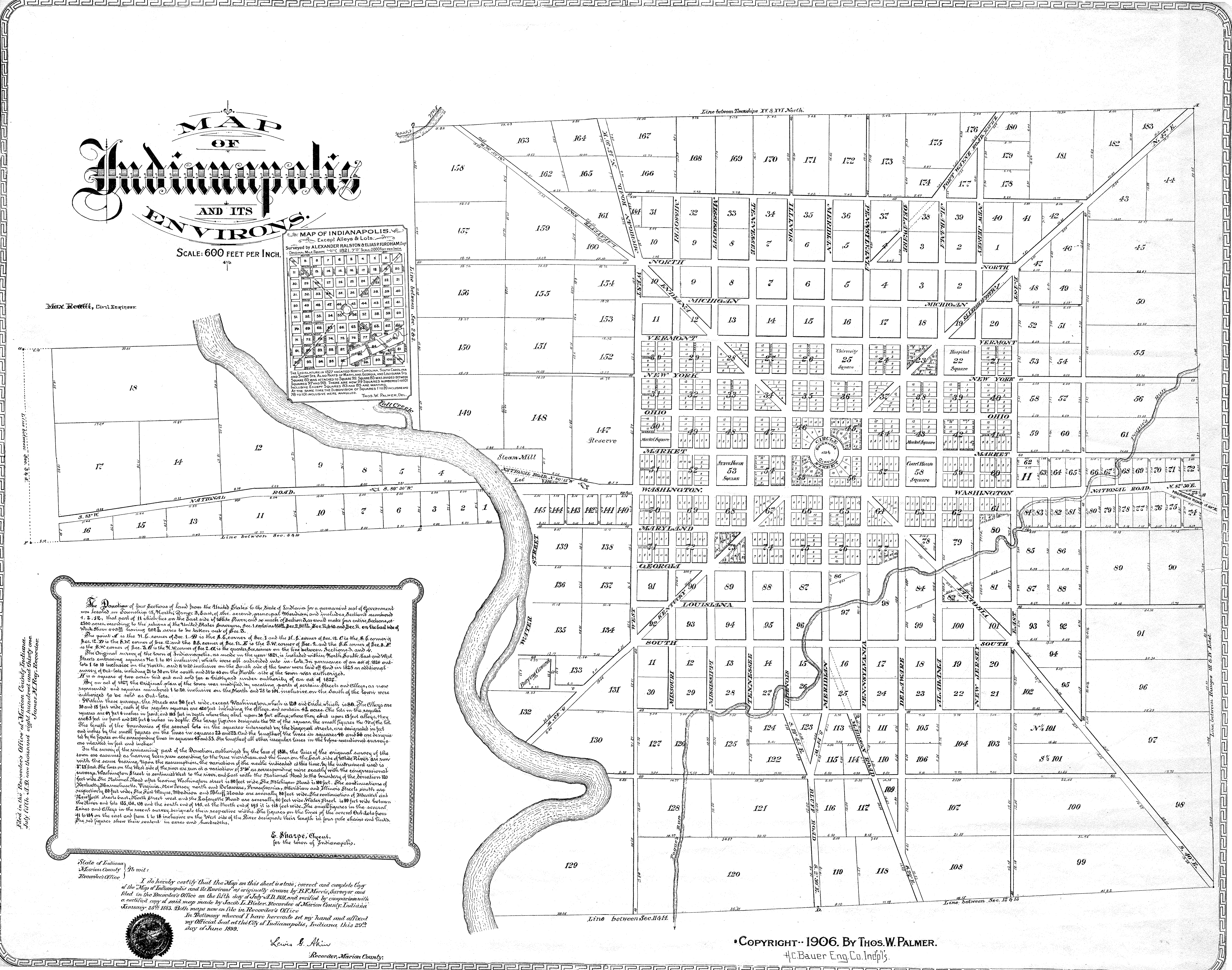
1831 map of Indianapolis in Marion County, originally drawn by surveyor B. F. Morris

During the American Civil War, Indianapolis was loyal to the Union cause. After the Battle of Fort Sumter in South Carolina, Indianapolis citizens proclaimed, "We unite as one man to repel all treasonable assaults upon the Government, its people, and citizens in every department of the Union––peaceably, if we can, forcibly if we must." Governor Oliver P. Morton, a major supporter of President Abraham Lincoln, quickly made Indianapolis a rallying place for Union army troops as they prepared to enter Confederate lands. On April 16, 1861, the first orders were issued to form Indiana's first regiments and establish Indianapolis as a gathering point for the state's volunteer soldiers. Within a week, more than 12,000 recruits from Indiana had signed up to fight for the Union, nearly three times as many needed to meet the state's initial quota.

Indianapolis became a major railroad hub and transportation center during the war, and therefore had military importance. Twenty-four military camps were established in the vicinity of Indianapolis, including Camp Sullivan, Camp Morton, Camp Burnside, Camp Fremont, and Camp Carrington, which was the state's largest. Camp Morton, which served as the initial mustering ground to organize and train the state's Union volunteers in 1861, was designated as a major prisoner-of-war camp for captured Confederate soldiers in 1862. In addition to military camps, a state-owned arsenal was established in Indianapolis in 1861, a permanent federal arsenal was established in 1862, and a Soldiers' Home and a Ladies' Home were established to house and feed Union soldiers and their families as they passed through the city. Several local facilities cared for wounded soldiers, including Indianapolis City Hospital. Crown Hill National Cemetery, one of Indiana's two national military cemeteries, was established in Indianapolis in 1866.

Slightly more than 60 percent (104) of Indiana's total regiments mustered into service and trained at Indianapolis. An estimated 4,000 men from Indianapolis and surrounding Marion County, Indiana, served in thirty-nine regiments, and an estimated 700 died during the war. The 11th Regiment Indiana Infantry, the first regiment organized in Indiana during the war, included all four of Indianapolis's militia units (the National Guards, the City Greys, the Indianapolis Independent Zouaves, and the Zouave Guards) and an additional company of men from Indianapolis. Most of Indiana's regimental units were organized within towns or counties, but ethnic units also formed. The 32nd Indiana Infantry Regiment, the state's first German-American infantry regiment, and the 35th Indiana Infantry Regiment, the state's first Irish-American regiment, organized at Indianapolis in 1861. The 28th Regiment United States Colored Troops, the only black regiment formed in Indiana during the war, trained in Indianapolis at Camp Fremont. Indianapolis's "City Regiment", which was composed mostly of young boys and older men, was a favorite among the locals. It mustered into service in May 1864 as the 132nd Indiana Infantry Regiment, one of several regiments of Hundred Days Men. The last military troops organized in Indianapolis was the 156th Indiana Infantry Regiment, which mustered into service on April 12, 1865. Most of the city's military camps were closed by the autumn of 1865.

City residents continued to support the Union soldiers throughout the war by providing food, clothing, equipment, and supplies, despite rising prices and wartime hardships, such as food and clothing shortages. Local soldiers' aid societies and the Indiana Sanitary Commission, whose headquarters were at Indianapolis, raised funds and gathered additional supplies for troops in the field. Indianapolis citizens also provided humanitarian aid for the prisoners at Camp Morton, local doctors aided the sick, and area women provided nursing care.

During the war years, Indianapolis's population increased from 18,611 in 1860 to 45,000 at the end of 1864, as the arrival of new businesses and industries offered additional employment opportunities. In 1861 Gilbert Van Camp founded Van Camp Packing Company, a canning business, in Indianapolis, and Kingan Brothers, a local meatpacking company, opened its first packing facility in the city in 1863. Indianapolis's first mule-drawn streetcar line began operating from the Union railway depot in 1864. Although the city experienced a real-estate boom and urban development, street crime was prevalent, causing the city government to increase its police force and local merchants to hire private security. In 1865 the Indiana General Assembly established the Criminal Circuit Court of Marion County in Indianapolis.

The Civil War-era was also a time of bitter political disputes between Indiana's Democrats and Republicans. Major political differences and wartime propaganda caused many Hoosiers to become suspicious of Union dissenters and fearful of potential insurrections. On May 20, 1863, Union soldiers attempted to disrupt a statewide Democratic convention at Indianapolis, forcing the proceedings to be adjourned, and caused an sarcastically referred to as the Battle of Pogue's Run. Union soldiers stopped and searched two departing trainloads of convention delegates, many of whom tossed their personal weapons into Pogue's Run, a nearby creek. Fear turned to panic in July 1863, during Morgan's Raid into southern Indiana, but the Confederates forces under the command of Confederate General John Hunt Morgan turned east toward Ohio and never reached Indianapolis.

Several other events took place in Indianapolis during the war years. On February 11, 1861, President-elect Abraham Lincoln arrived in Indianapolis, en route to Washington, D.C. for his presidential inauguration, marking the first-ever visit from a president-elect to the capital city. During the war, Richard Jordan Gatling invented and tested his Gatling gun at Indianapolis. Patented in November 1862, the U.S. Navy adopted the Gatling gun during the war, but the U.S. Army did not formally adopt it for use until 1866. Indianapolis was also the site of the first military execution in the war's western theater. On March 27, 1863, Robert Gay, a Union soldier convicted of treason, was executed by a firing squad. Beginning in Indianapolis in 1864, the trials by a military commission of several men accused and convicted of treason lead to a landmark civil liberty case in 1866. Known as Ex parte Milligan, the Supreme Court of the United States overturned the convictions, ruling that the trials by military commission in Indianapolis were illegal because the civilian courts were open and functioning during the war. On April 30, 1865, Lincoln's funeral train made a stop at Indianapolis, where an estimated crowd of more than 100,000 people passed the assassinated president's bier at the Indiana Statehouse.

== Growth and transition (1866–1900) ==
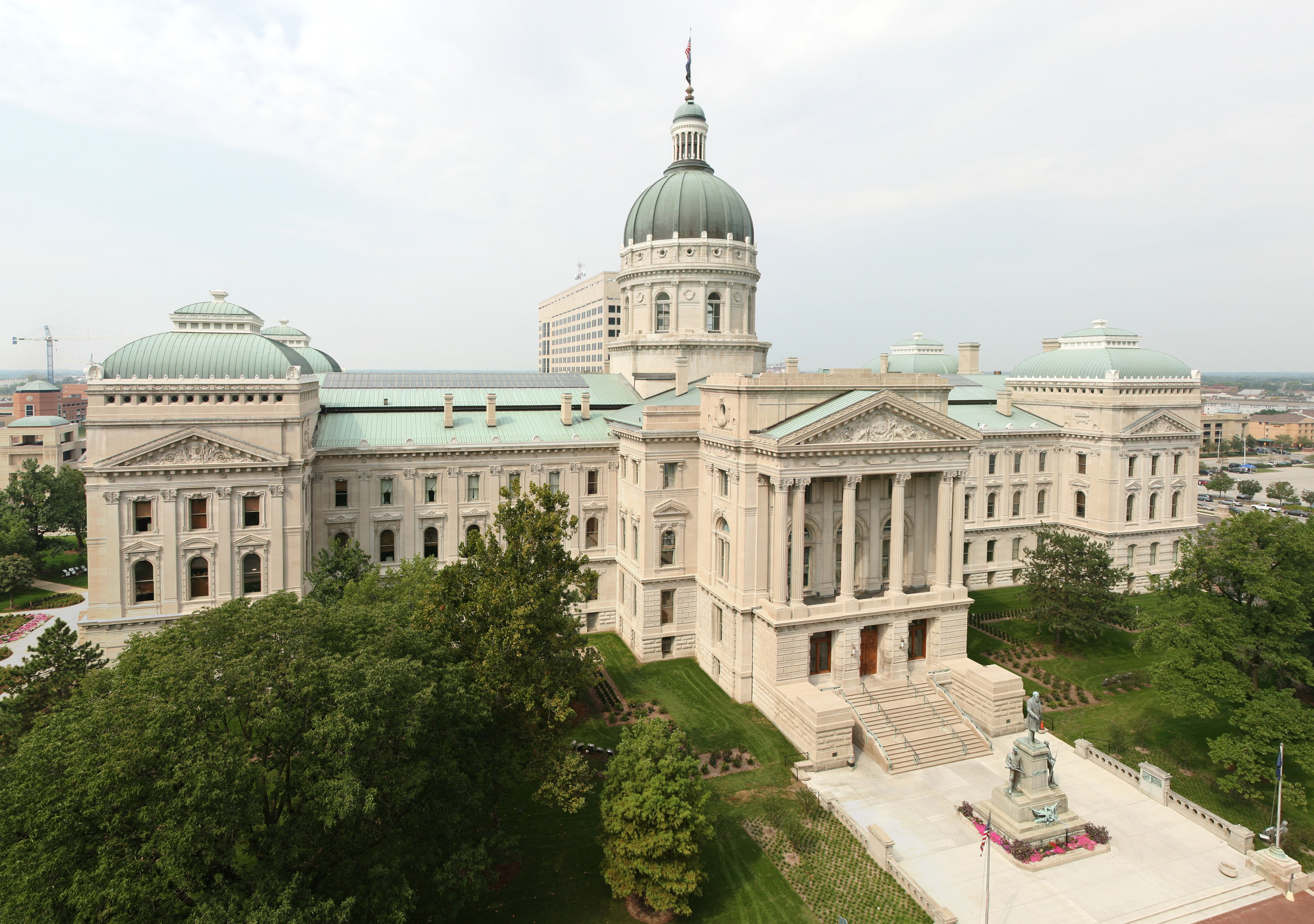
Indiana Statehouse, Indianapolis.

In the last half of the nineteenth century, when the city's population soared from 8,091 in 1850 to 169,164 in 1900, urban development expanded in all directions as Indianapolis experienced a building boom and transitioned from an agricultural community to an industrial center. Some of the city's most iconic structures were built during this period, including several that have survived to the present day: the Soldiers' and Sailors' Monument (1888, dedicated 1902), the Indiana Statehouse (1888), Union Station (1888), and the Das Deutsche Haus (1898), among others.

The Black population originally thrived in the vibrant Indiana Avenue neighborhood, which served as a hub of black culture for the entire Midwest. Though officially founded as a specific community in 1869, Indiana Avenue was home to a black Christian church by 1836 and had a majority of black-owned businesses by 1865. A strong black middle class called this neighborhood home, as did jazz greats such as Freddie Hubbard, Jimmy Coe, Noble Sissle, and Wes Montgomery.

Construction of Indianapolis's belt railroad and stockyards in the late 1870s, the Indiana gas boom in the late 1880s, and increasing railroad traffic during the late nineteenth century helped transform Indianapolis into a Midwestern industrial center. Several major railroads such as the Pennsylvania, Monon, "Big Four," and the Lake Erie and Western lines passed through Indianapolis. The late nineteenth century was also a time of significant industrial growth. Between 1880 and 1900 the number of industrial manufacturers in the city increased from 688 to 1,190 and the value of manufactured goods grew from $28 million to $69 million. Major industries, such as food processing, began to emerge. Kingan and Company, among the largest packing plants in the country, established operations in Indianapolis in 1864 and rebuilt in 1866 following a spectacular fire. Gilbert Van Camp's canning company had already begun to can vegetables, but expanded its Indianapolis operations to include pork and beans (Boston baked beans). National Starch Manufacturing Company (1890) was also a major employer in the city. In addition, Indianapolis became a banking and insurance center. Despite the industrial development and economic growth, many of the city's laborers experienced poor working conditions, low wages, and long working hours, which contributed to the rise of organized labor unions in Indianapolis. The city experienced the threat of labor strikes, with a major railroad strike in 1877 among the most significant.

Increased demand for industrial labor encouraged new migration to the city, including African Americans after the American Civil War, but most of the new arrivals came from Indiana's rural areas. Immigrants from outside the United States included English, Irish, and Germans, as well as Eastern and Southern Europeans, especially Hungarians, Italians, Greeks, and Slavs of various origins.

The late nineteenth century was also a time of growth and change in the Indianapolis educational community, when several improvements were made to the city's schools and public library. In response to the need for a skilled labor force, the Indianapolis Public Schools established its first manual training programs, which expanded to include the Industrial Training School. In 1875 North Western Christian University relocated from its campus at present-day Thirteenth Street and College Avenue to a new site in the suburban community of Irvington, east of downtown Indianapolis. In 1877 the college changed its name to Butler University. In addition, several notable private schools, such as the Classical School for Boys (1879) and the Girls' Classical School (1881), were established. In 1873 the Indianapolis Public Library opened in a room at the city's public high school, but moved to larger quarters after outgrowing its space. In 1893 the public library relocated to a new building erected at Pennsylvania and Ohio Streets, where it remained until 1917. The city's first library branch opened in 1896.

In addition to the construction of new schools and libraries, many new places of worship were built in the downtown area. Although many of them have been demolished or converted to other purposes, several continue to offer religious services, such as Bethel African Methodist Episcopal Church (1869) on West Vermont Street, Saint John the Evangelist Catholic Church (1867–71) on South Capitol Avenue, Roberts Park United Methodist Church (1870–76) at Delaware and Vermont Streets, Lockerbie Square United Methodist Church (1883) on North East Street, and Central Christian Church (1892) at the corner of Fort Wayne Avenue and Walnut Street, among others. In addition, the seat of the Roman Catholic Diocese of Vincennes, Indiana, moved to Indianapolis in 1878, and its name was changed to the Diocese of Indianapolis in 1898.

An increasing population, along with the rise of urbanization and industrialization, caused Indianapolis leaders to make improvements to the city's social services. City Hospital, which was used as a military hospital during the American Civil War, was returned to the city and began accepting patents in 1866. Methodist Hospital of Indianapolis was established as the result of fundraising efforts that began in 1889. The Indianapolis Benevolent Society, reorganized in 1878 and renamed Indianapolis's Charity Organization Society, coordinated poor relief for various agencies. Other civic improvements included formation of the Home for Aged and Friendless Women (1866), the Indianapolis Flower Mission (1876), and the Free Kindergarten and Children's Aid Society (1881), among others.

New suburban neighborhoods, such as Woodruff Place and Irvington, were established as the city expanded outward, with streetcars connecting downtown Indianapolis to outlying neighborhoods. Despite the new development, Indianapolis still had slum areas, including some with such descriptive names as Brickville and Irish Hill, and places such as the Levee, an entertainment area around Union Station. To help maintain order, the city council granted police powers to private security forces for local merchants and at the Union railroad depot.

Indianapolis citizens also enjoyed a greater variety of entertainments. Theaters and performances of all types were popular among city residents, including minstrel shows, burlesque, variety shows, circuses, operettas, concerts, drama, opera, and other forms of entertainment. Venues varied from amusement parks, concert halls and sporting events to beer gardens and saloons. Top theaters included the Metropolitan (1858, renamed the Park in 1879) and the English Opera House. As in other areas of the United States, the bicycle craze arrived in Indianapolis in the mid-1890s. During a League of American Wheelmen meet in Indianapolis in 1898, African American cyclist Major Taylor competed and won at the city's Newby Oval cycling track.

The era also saw the beginning of the Indianapolis Park and Boulevard System, a network of wide, tree-lined streets linked to city parks, and improvements to outdoor gathering spots. Several of the city's early parks originated in the late nineteenth century. Military Park, used as a military training ground during the American Civil War, was transformed into a city park. In addition, Fairview Park, Garfield Park, and Riverside Park were established, although they were not completed developed until the next century. In addition to new parks, the site of Camp Morton, a prison camp for Confederate soldiers during the American Civil War, was returned to its original purpose as a fairgrounds. The city government also took responsibility for the Governor's Circle, which was later renamed Monument Circle, and added landscaping to the vacant University Square and its military grounds to establish University Park (1876).

Numerous social clubs such as the Indianapolis Woman's Club (1875) and notable men's clubs that included the Indianapolis Literary Club (1877) and the Century Club (1890) encouraged civic engagement and personal development. The city's ethnic groups also built new clubs and gathering places of their own. For example, Das Deuche Haus (1898), the present-day Athenæum, became the city's center for German culture.

The late nineteenth century was also an important time for the city's numerous newspapers, when several of them changed ownership, merged with other publications, and were renamed. Although the Indiana Journal became the city's first daily newspaper in 1842, the Indianapolis News began publishing the city's first evening newspaper in 1869. The Indianapolis Leader, believed to be the city's first African American newspaper, was founded in 1879. Indianapolis printed the nation's first illustrated black newspaper in 1888. This newspaper, the Indianapolis Freeman, was circulated nationally and considered by many the leading black journal in America - dubbed the Harper's Weekly of the United States' black community.

The 1880s and 1890s are considered to be the city's golden years, when Indianapolis resident Benjamin Harrison was elected to the U.S. Senate in 1881 and won as the Republican Party candidate for president of the United States in 1888. The era also coincided with the beginning of Indiana's golden age of literature. Several of the state's popular authors and poets had ties to Indianapolis, including Lew Wallace, Maurice Thompson, Charles Major, and James Whitcomb Riley.

Indianapolis survived financial challenges during the last half of nineteenth century to become a prominent railroad hub, food processor, and a Midwestern manufacturing and industrial center. By 1900 Indianapolis was at a crossroads. It had grown from a small, agricultural town into a prominent industrial city in the Midwest, but Indianapolis continued to face several challenges such as low wages for many of its workers, industrial pollution, gender and minority discrimination, and limited local capital for further development.

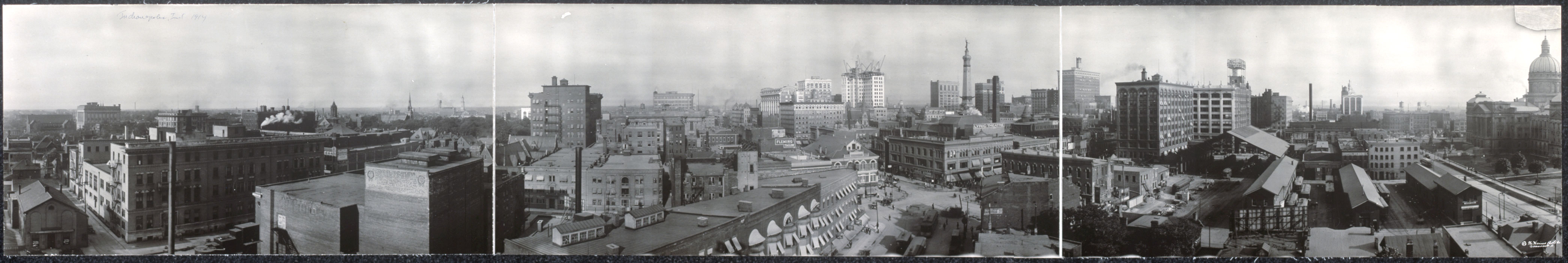
Indianapolis in the early 20th century, likely c. 1914

== Modern era (1900-) ==
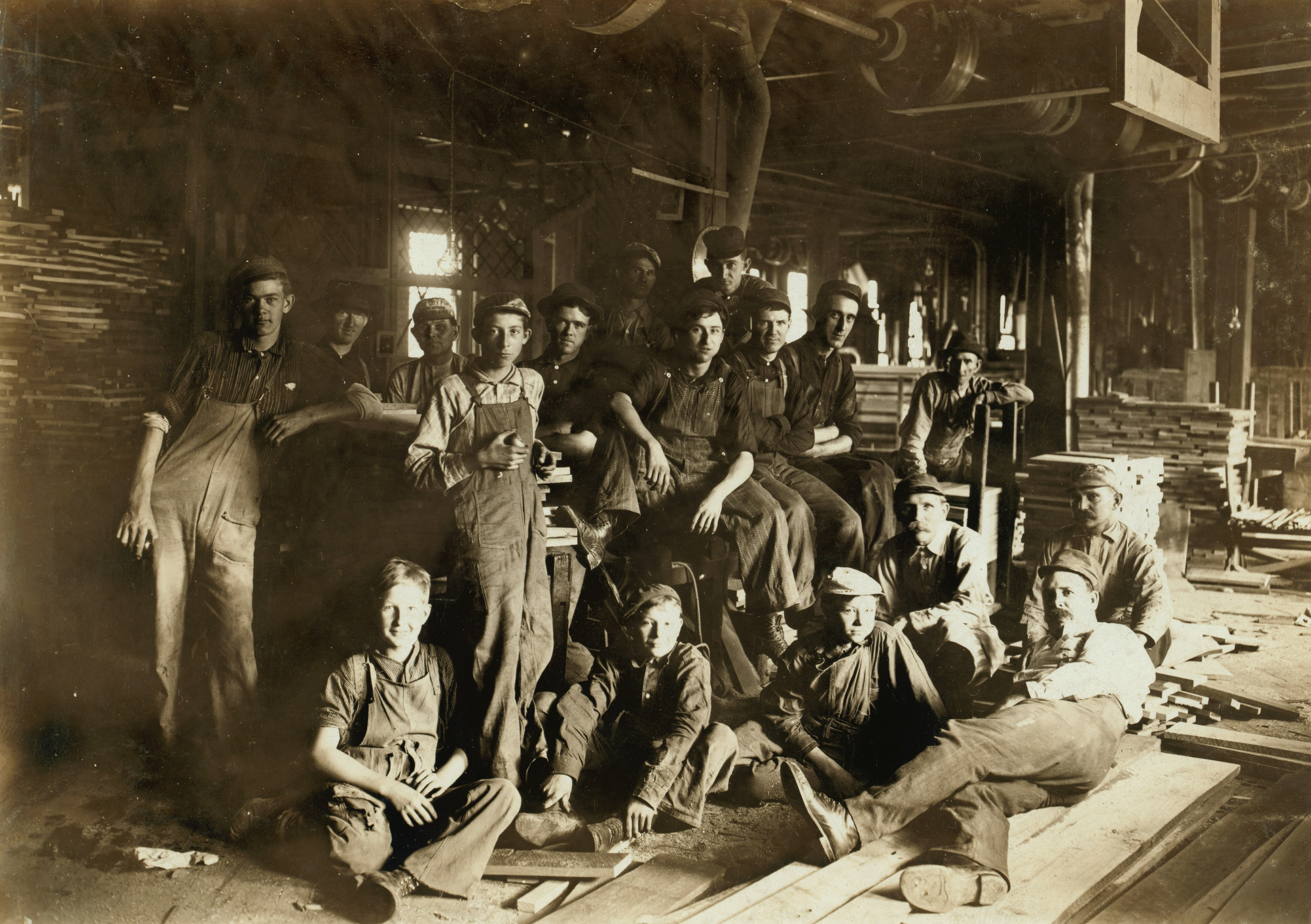
Child workers. Noon hour in a furniture factory. Indianapolis, Indiana, August 1908. Photographed by Lewis Hine.

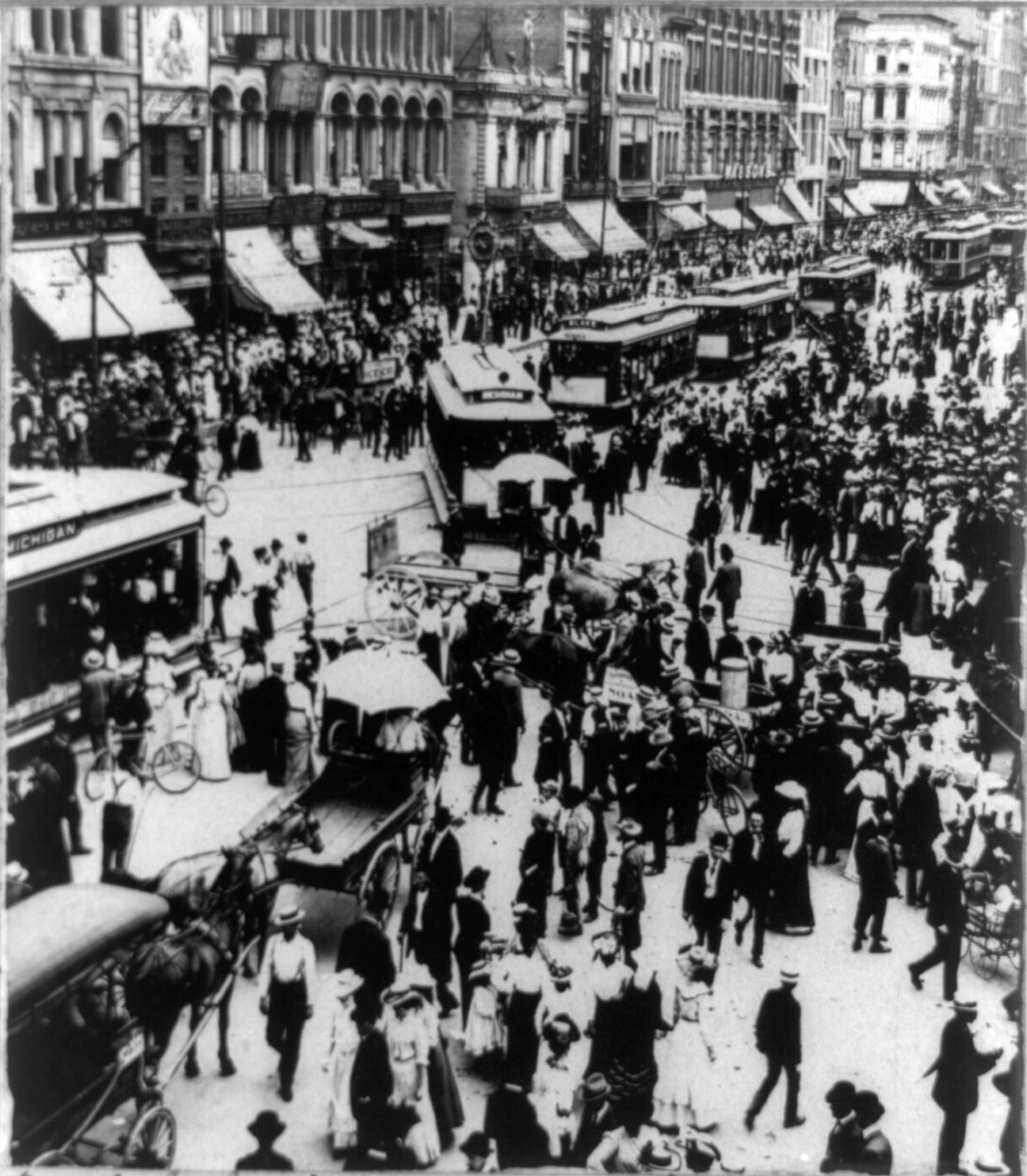
"One of the busiest corners in the world", Illinois and Washington Sts., 1904

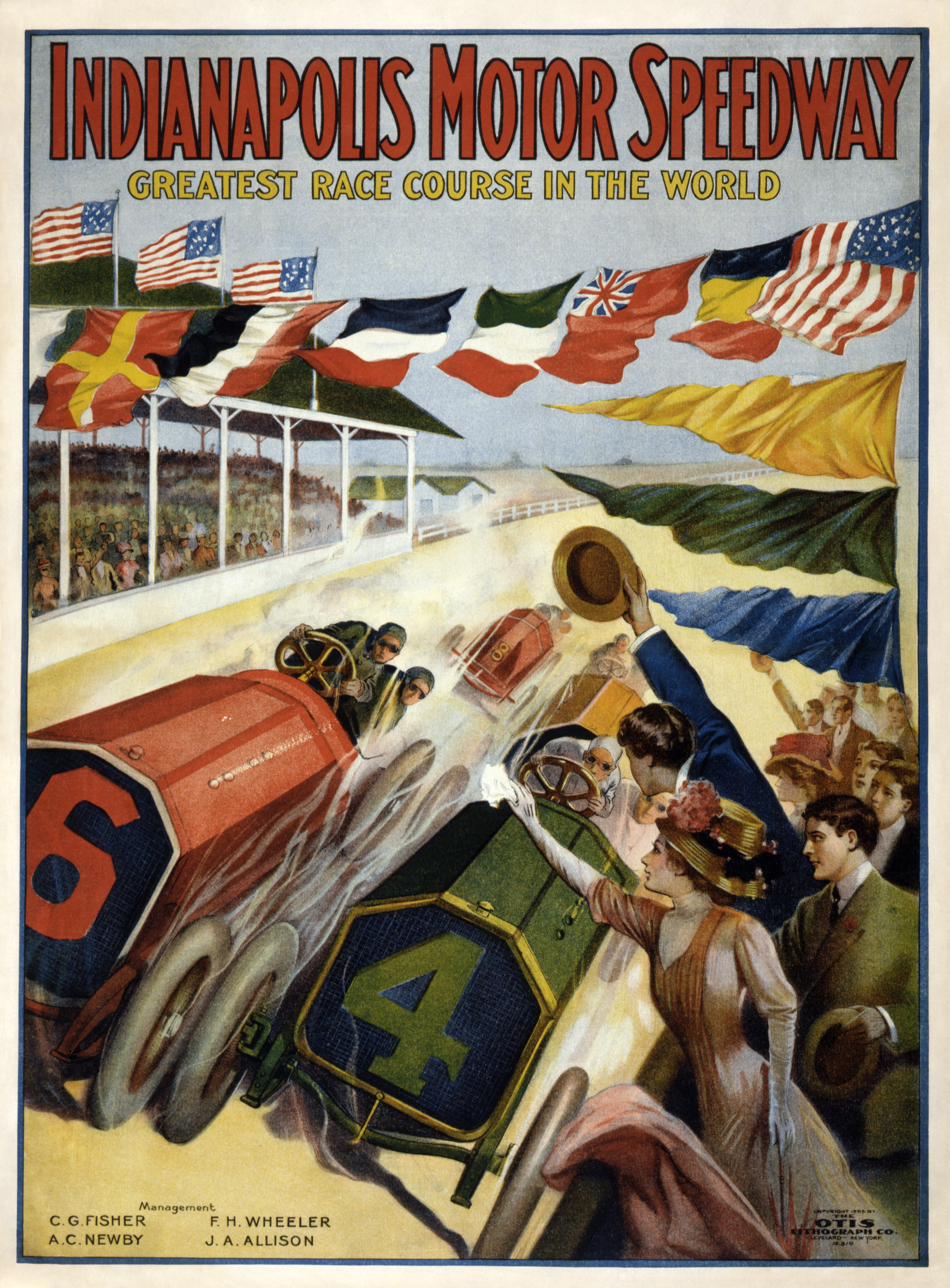
1909 poster advertising the Indianapolis Motor Speedway.

=== Industrialization ===
The automobile, as in most American cities, caused a suburban explosion. With automobile companies as Duesenberg, Marmon, National, and Stutz, Indianapolis was a center of production rivaling Detroit, at least for a few years. The internationally renowned automobile races that take place at the Indianapolis Motor Speedway every year are a notable residual from that booming industry at the beginning of the 20th century. With roads as the spokes of a wheel, Indianapolis was on its way to becoming a major hub of regional transport connecting to Chicago, Louisville, Cincinnati, Columbus and St. Louis, as is befitting the capital of a state whose motto is "The Crossroads of America." Today, four interstate roads intersect in Indianapolis: routes 65, 69, 70, and 74. The city is a major trucking center, and the extensive network of highways has allowed Indianapolis to enjoy a relatively low amount of traffic congestion for a city its size.

A strike by the street car workers in Indianapolis began in October 1913. The strike was called on the eve of the city elections and hindered many people from being able to vote, causing considerable public outrage. The union demanded the passage of a law to better protect what they believe to be their rights and wanted Governor Samuel Ralston to call a special session of the Indiana General Assembly to pass such a bill. The strike quickly began to grow and other unions and labor organizations joined. Business leaders demanded the governor call out the army and end the strike, but the unions threatened violence if that happened. On November 5, Ralston finally called out the entire Indiana National Guard and put the city under martial law. At noon on the 6th, the strikers and their sympathizers gathered around the Indiana Statehouse and began chanting a demand that the troops leave the city. Ralston exited the building and spoke to the crowd offering to withdraw the troops if the strikers would go back to work and negotiate peacefully. He offered concessions and promises that convinced the strikers of his good intentions, effectively ending the strike that day. The strike led to the creation of the states earliest labor protection laws including a minimum wage, regular work weeks, and improved working conditions.

=== Political development ===
Indianapolis entered a period of great prosperity at the beginning of the 20th century, and during this time the city witnessed great economic, social, and cultural progress. Much of this was due to the discovery in 1886 of a huge natural gas deposit in east-central Indiana, the celebrated Trenton Gas Field. A few years later, the discovery of oil in the area would follow and cause an increase in the population. The Trenton Field formed the western portion of what was at the time the world's largest oil field and natural gas deposit, the Lima-Indiana Field (stretching from northwestern Ohio to east-central Indiana). The state government offered a free supply of natural gas to factories that were built there. This led to a sharp increase in industries such as glass and automobile manufacturing. However, the natural gas deposits were largely depleted by 1912 and completely gone by 1920, and the end of the Indiana Gas Boom along with the coinciding rapid decline of oil production (which continued on a greatly diminished scale until 1930) contributed to an abrupt end of the golden era. The 1920 census was the first to show that Indiana had more urban than rural inhabitants.

In 1910, Madam C. J. Walker moved herself and her cosmetics manufacturing company to Indianapolis. Walker would become America's first self-made woman millionaire and the richest Black American of her day. Her career as both a businesswoman and a philanthropist is memorialized by the Madam Walker Legacy Center which continues to provide entertainment on Indiana Avenue to this day.

==== Ku Klux Klan ====
The Indiana chapter of the Klan was founded in 1920 and quickly became the most powerful Klan organization in the United States. In 1922, D. C. Stephenson was appointed the Klan Grand Dragon of Indiana and 22 other states; he promptly moved the Indiana Klan's headquarters to Indianapolis, which was already coming under the Klan's influence. The Klan became the most powerful political and social organization in the city during the period from 1921 through 1928.

The Klan continued to solidify its strong hold on the state, taking over the Indiana Republican Party and using its new political might to establish a Klan-backed slate of candidates which swept state elections in 1924. The elections allowed the Klan to seize control of the Indiana General Assembly and place the corrupt Governor Edward L. Jackson in office. By then, more than 40% of the native-born white males in Indianapolis claimed membership in the Klan. Klan-backed candidates took over the City Council, the Board of School Commissioners, and the Board of County Commissioners. Through the Klan, Stephenson ruled over the State of Indiana, leading a powerful national movement set on gaining control of the United States Congress and the White House. However, the power of the Klan would quickly begin to crumble after Stephenson was convicted at the end of 1925 for the rape and murder of a young Indianapolis woman, Madge Oberholtzer.

With Stephenson's conviction, the Klan suffered a tremendous blow and quickly lost influence. When Governor Jackson refused to pardon him, Stephenson retaliated by going public with information of corruption which brought down several politicians throughout Indiana. The Mayor of Indianapolis and several local officials were convicted of bribery and jailed. Governor Jackson was indicted on charges of bribery, but he was acquitted in 1928 because the statute of limitations had run out; he completed his term in disgrace. The Klan continued to dwindle in popularity in Indiana and nationwide, and the national organization officially disbanded in 1944.

==== Unigov ====
As the result of a 1970 consolidation of city and county governments (known as "Unigov"), the city of Indianapolis merged most government services with those of the county. For the most part, this resulted in a unification of Indianapolis with its immediate suburbs. Four communities within Marion County (Beech Grove, Lawrence, Southport and Speedway) are partially outside of the Unigov arrangement. Also, 11 other communities (called "included towns") are legally included in the Consolidated City of Indianapolis under Unigov, per Indiana Code 36-3-1-4 sec. 4(a)(2), which states that the Consolidated City of Indianapolis includes the entire area of Marion County, except the four previously mentioned "excluded" communities. The 11 "included towns" (there were originally 14, but 3 later dissolved) elected to retain their "town status" under Unigov as defined according to the Indiana Constitution, but the Indiana Constitution does not define "town status". Additionally, Cumberland straddles Hancock and Marion Counties.

These "included towns" are fully subject to the laws and control of the Consolidated City of Indianapolis, but some still impose a separate property tax and provide police and other services under contract with township or county government or the City of Indianapolis. Additionally, throughout Marion County certain local services such as schools, fire and police remained unconsolidated under the Unigov legislation. However, the mayor of Indianapolis is also the mayor of all of Marion County, and the City-County Council sits as the legislative body for all of Marion County. Further consolidation of city and county services and functions would require passage of new legislation by the Indiana General Assembly.

A bill, dubbed Indianapolis Works, was proposed by then Mayor Bart Peterson, and introduced in the 2005 legislative session of the state General Assembly, which would have further consolidated local government in the City of Indianapolis and Marion County. The Assembly passed a less-comprehensive version of the original bill that consolidated budgetary functions of the City and County, permitted the City-County Council to vote to consolidate the Indianapolis Police Department and the Marion County Sheriff's Department, and also permitted consolidation of the Indianapolis Fire Department with individual township fire departments based upon approval of the affected parties. The Washington Township Fire Department was the first township to merge with the Indianapolis Fire Department, effective January 1, 2007.

Police consolidation was defeated by the City-County Council in November 2005, but the bill was revived and passed on December 19, 2005, after slight revision. As of January 1, 2007, Indianapolis has a combined metropolitan police force. However, the Indianapolis Metropolitan Police Department is not the sole police agency within Marion county or even pre-Unigov Indianapolis. The four "excluded cities" of Beech Grove, Lawrence, Southport, and Speedway still maintain separate police forces, as do many of the school districts and "included towns" within Marion County.

=== Education and civil rights ===
While Indianapolis had some segregated elementary schools in the early 1900s, high schools were not segregated until 1927, when, with the rise of the Ku Klux Klan in Indiana, Crispus Attucks High School was established despite the opposition of the African-American community. However, even after 1948, when school segregation was outlawed in Indiana, many African-Americans took pride in Attucks, in part because all its teachers had at least master's degrees and many had PhD's. In 1955 Crispus Attucks, led by the legendary Oscar Robertson, became the first all-black high school in America to win an integrated state basketball championship. The team repeated its championship in 1956, becoming the first team in Indiana to have an undefeated season.

Years later, Indianapolis witnessed a historic moment in the Civil Rights Movement. On April 4, 1968, the day of the assassination of Martin Luther King Jr., Robert F. Kennedy delivered an impromptu speech on race reconciliation to a mostly African-American crowd in a poor inner-city Indianapolis neighborhood. Indianapolis was the only major American city spared the rioting that broke out across the country after the assassination.

Currently, Indianapolis is home to the Indiana Black Expo. The Indiana Black Expo Summer Celebration is the largest ethnic/cultural event in the United States. This ten-day event, held in the Indiana Convention Center as well as various places around Indianapolis, draws African-Americans to Indianapolis from both around the state and around the country. Organized in 1970, the Black Expo has provided networking, educational, career, and cultural opportunities for its guests. Participation at the 2006 Summer Celebration reached record highs, with over 350,000 in attendance.

== See also ==
- Indianapolis
- Timeline of Indianapolis
- Indianapolis City-County Council
