= Ethan Evans (politician) =

American Politician

Member of the Indianapolis City-County Council from the 4th District
- Preceded by: Michael J. McQuillen
- Succeeded by: Nick Roberts (politician)

Personal details
- Party: Democratic

Ethan Evans is a former Indianapolis City-County Council member. Evans represented District 4 on the Northeast side of Indianapolis, which includes Geist Reservoir and Castleton Square.

== Early life and education ==
Evans grew up in Lawrence Township and completed K–12 in that school district. He attended San Francisco State University, where he received a Bachelor of Arts in Cinematography. He earned a Master of Arts in Secondary Education from Indiana University Bloomington.

== Career ==
Evans was elected as an Indianapolis city-county council member after the 2019 elections. His election added to the increase of LGBTQ-identifying members of the council, which was a historic moment in Indianapolis politics.

In 2022, Evans pulled away from Democratic affiliation, and began to operate as an independent. He opted not to seek reelection for 2023 after serving one term as a city-county council member. Evans expressed in a statement that he felt shut out from the inside the party and this exclusion was the reason for his departure.

== Electoral history ==
=== Democratic primary election ===
Indianapolis City-County Council District 4 Democratic primary election
Party	Candidate	Votes	%
Democratic	Ethan P. Evans	785	63.2%
Democratic	Timothy Alan Knight	458	36.8%
Total votes		1,243	100.0%

=== General election ===
Indianapolis City-County Council District 4
Party	Candidate	Votes	%
Democratic	Ethan P. Evans	4,114	52.2%
Republican	Mike Mcquillen	3,763	47.8%
Total votes		7,877	100.00%
Democratic hold			
