= Nick Roberts (politician) =

American politician (born 2000)

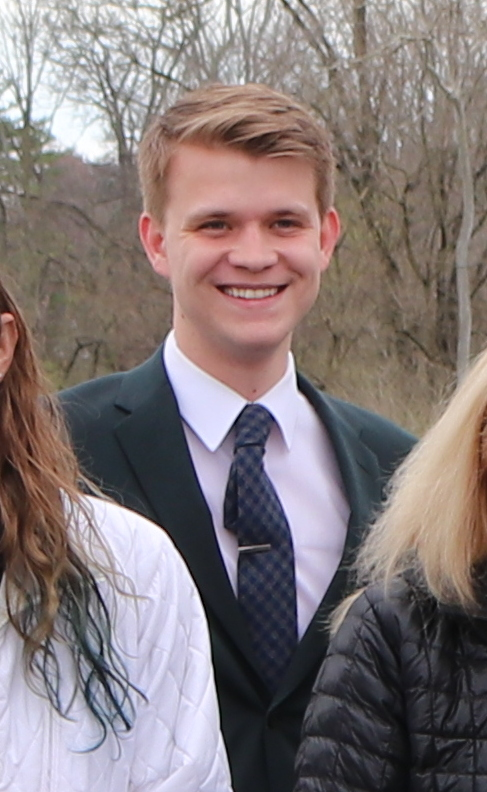
- Roberts at the Indy North Floodworks Accreditation Announcement in March 2024

Member of the Indianapolis City-County Council from the 4th District
- Incumbent
- Assumed office January 1, 2024
- Preceded by: Ethan Evans

Personal details
- Born: August 14, 2000 (age 25)
- Party: Democratic
- Education: Indiana University, Indianapolis

Nicholas Anthony Roberts (born August 14, 2000) is an American politician who has served as the councilor for the 4th District on the Indianapolis City-County Council, representing the northeast corner of the city, covering Geist Reservoir and Castleton Square, since 2024.

== Career ==
At the time of his election, he was slated to be the second-youngest person and the first member of Generation Z to serve on the council at 23, and the youngest elected official for any of the 50 largest American cities.

Roberts was assigned in 2024 to the committees on Administration and Finance, Community Affairs, Environmental Sustainability and Public Works.

== Electoral history ==
=== Democratic primary election ===
Indianapolis City-County Council District 4 Democratic primary election
Party	Candidate	Votes	%
Democratic	Nick Roberts	1,727	100.00%
Total votes		1,727	100.00%

=== General election ===
Indianapolis City-County Council District 4
Party	Candidate	Votes	%
Democratic	Nick Roberts	5,936	53.6%
Republican	Natalie Goodwin	5,131	46.4%
Total votes		11,067	100.00%
Democratic hold			

== Personal life ==
Nick has an identical twin brother, Nathan. Unlike Nick, Nathan is a Republican.
