= Vop Osili =

American politician

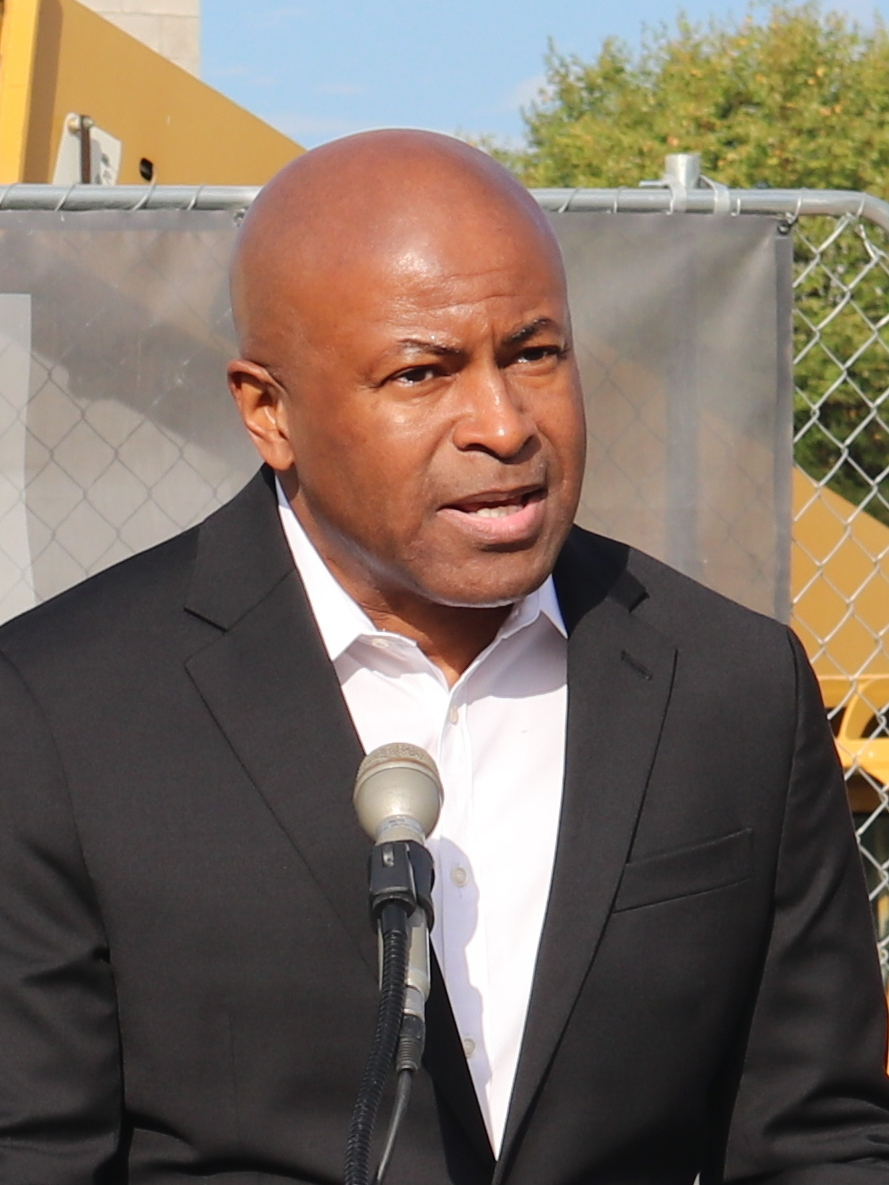

President of the Indianapolis City-County Council
- In office February 19, 2018 – January 5, 2026
- Preceded by: Stephen Clay
- Succeeded by: Maggie Lewis

Member of the Indianapolis City-County Council from the 12th district
- Incumbent
- Assumed office January 1, 2012
- Preceded by: Doris Minton-McNeill

Personal details
- Born: Samuel Ifeanyi Osili Jr. 1963 (age 62–63) Lagos, Nigeria
- Party: Democratic
- Spouse: Una Okonkwo
- Children: 2
- Education: Carnegie Mellon University (BArch); Columbia University (MArch)

Samuel Ifeanyi "Vop" Osili Jr. (born 1963) is a Democratic politician from Indianapolis, Indiana. He is a member of the Indianapolis City-County Council from the 11th district, in the northwestern portion of Center Township. He served as the council's president from 2018 to 2026.

On December 22, 2011, an Indiana judge declared him the secretary of state-elect of Indiana due to first-place finisher Charlie White's ineligibility, though this was later reversed on appeal.

== Early life ==
Osili was born in Lagos, Nigeria, to a Nigerian father (Ifeanyi Osili) and an American mother (A'Lelia Josephine Kirk Osili). In the midst of the Nigerian Civil War, he and his mother fled to the United States; his father did not follow them for another five years. They settled in his maternal grandparents' home in Haughville.

He grew up as a Republican but became a Democrat in the 1990s.

== Education and early career ==
Osili graduated from Carnegie-Mellon University with a bachelor's degree in architecture, and earned a master's degree in architecture and urban design from Columbia University. He later served as a missionary to Haiti and other developing countries. He is a founding partner of A2SO4, an Indianapolis-based architectural design company that was one of the first Leadership in Energy and Environmental Design-certified firms in the nation. He was a member of the Indiana Fire and Building Services Commission from 2001 to 2005, and chairman of the Indianapolis Board of Zoning Appeals from 2005 to 2008. At various times, he served as a member of the boards of the YMCA of Greater Indianapolis, the United Way of Central Indiana and the Children's Museum of Indianapolis.

== Secretary of State of Indiana election ==
In 2010, Osili was the Democratic candidate for Secretary of State of Indiana, pledging to reinvigorate the business services section of the office. He was initially a heavy underdog against Republican candidate Charlie White. However, White came under fire for claiming his former home in Fishers as his official residence and continuing to serve on the Fishers town council even after moving out of town, and for voting in his old precinct in the Republican primary. Polls initially showed Osili gaining ground on White in the Indianapolis area as a result of the controversy. However, on election day, Osili took only 37 percent of the vote amid the massive Republican wave that swept through Indiana.

The Democrats subsequently filed suit to overturn White's victory, claiming that since Secretary of State candidates must be registered voters, they must be registered legally and therefore White was ineligible to run. However, the state Recount Commission dismissed the Democrats' claim. The Democrats appealed, and on April 7 Marion County judge Louis Rosenberg ordered the Recount Commission to make a ruling on the legality of White's registration. The commission voted unanimously to clear White, accepting his claim that he intended to use his old home as his permanent address. The Democrats asked Rosenburg to review the decision, which he did (in White's absence) on November 23. He was expected to make a ruling in 30 days.

=== 2011 election certification ===
On December 22, 2011, Rosenberg ruled that White had in fact violated election law, and that he had been ineligible to run. Rosenberg ordered the Recount Commission to remove White from office and declare Osili as the winner by default. White immediately announced he would appeal, and asked Rosenberg to stay his ruling until a higher court could hear the case. The next day, Rosenburg issued a temporary stay on his own ruling until January 3, 2012. On January 4, Rosenburg ruled that White could stay in office while his appeal worked its way through the courts. If Osili ultimately became Secretary of State, he would have been the first Democrat to hold that post since 1994.

According to Jim Shella, political reporter at WISH-TV in Indianapolis, if Osili ultimately became Secretary of State, the Republicans would have legally received no votes in the Secretary of State's race. This would drop them below the 10 percent threshold required to retain major-party status in the state (major party status is determined by Secretary of State results).

On February 4, 2012, White was convicted of six felonies related to his actions in the 2010 election, thus automatically removing him from office; Indiana, like most states, does not allow convicted felons to hold office. White tried to get the charges reduced to misdemeanors at sentencing, but Hamilton County Superior Court Judge Steven Nation refused to do so, thus ending any chance of White regaining office even if Rosenberg's ruling giving the office to Osilli had been reversed on appeal. Governor Mitch Daniels appointed White's deputy, Jerry Bonnet, as interim Secretary of State. However, the Indiana Supreme Court threw out Rosenburg's ruling, holding that the Democrats had filed their challenge too late. The court's decision allowed Daniels to appoint a permanent successor.

== Indianapolis City-County Council ==
In 2011, Osili won the race in City-County Council District 15 against Republican A. J. Feeney-Ruiz and Libertarian Zachary Capehart.. He received 80% of the vote.

In 2015, the council districts were redrawn, eliminating four at-large seats, and shifting Osili to District 11. Osili won the 2015 election for District 11 against Republican Remington O'Guin with 86% of the vote.

In February 2018, City-County Council President Stephen Clay stepped down and endorsed Osili to succeed him. Osili was elected president unanimously.

Osili currently serves as the chair of the Committee on Committees, and Rules and Public Policy. Osili serves on the standing committee for Community Affairs.

Party political offices
| Preceded by Joe Pearson | Democratic nominee for Secretary of State of Indiana; 2010 | Succeeded by Beth White |
