= Government of Indianapolis =

American city government

Consolidated City of Indianapolis and Marion County
- Flag of Indianapolis
- Formation: 1832; 194 years ago
- Indianapolis City Charter: 1832, 1838, 1847, 1853, 1891, 1970
- Website: www.indy.gov

Legislative branch
- Legislature: Indianapolis City-County Council
- Meeting place: City-County Building

Executive branch
- Mayor: Mayor of Indianapolis
- Appointed by: Election
- Headquarters: City-County Building

The Government of Indianapolis—officially the Consolidated City of Indianapolis and Marion County—is a strong-mayor form of mayor-council government system in the American city of Indianapolis. Local government is headquartered downtown at the City-County Building.

Since 1970, Indianapolis and Marion County have operated as a consolidated city-county government called Unigov. The executive branch is headed by the mayor who serves as the chief executive and administrative officer for both the city and county. The Indianapolis City-County Council is a unicameral legislative body consisting of 25 members, each elected from a geographic district. The mayor and council members are elected to unlimited four-year terms. The judicial branch consists of the Marion Circuit and Superior Courts. The municipal budget for 2024 is nearly $1.6 billion. The city-county government employs about 8,000 full-time employees.

Marion County contains nine civil townships that function independently from the city-county government under Indiana Code. Each township consists of an elected township trustee, a three-member board, an assessor, and a constable and small claims court judge, all of whom serve four-year terms.

== History ==
Citizens Energy Group is responsible for city water, wastewater, and stormwater systems. These were previously operated by the City's Department of Waterworks through a contract with Veolia. However, the transfer of the water and wastewater systems to Citizens Energy Group was approved by the Indiana Utility Regulatory Commission on July 13, 2011. The transfer of the systems to Citizens Energy Group was completed on August 26, 2011. Citizens is a public charitable trust that is operated for the benefit of its customers; it was acquired by the city of Indianapolis in 1933.

== Executive branch ==
=== City administration ===
Despite the nature of a unified city-county government, several bureaucratic functions remain separate. For example, Marion County's nine civil townships retained autonomy under Unigov. This resulted in maintaining separate public services, such as independent school districts or fire departments, that would have otherwise been consolidated into single entities.

==== Office of the Mayor ====
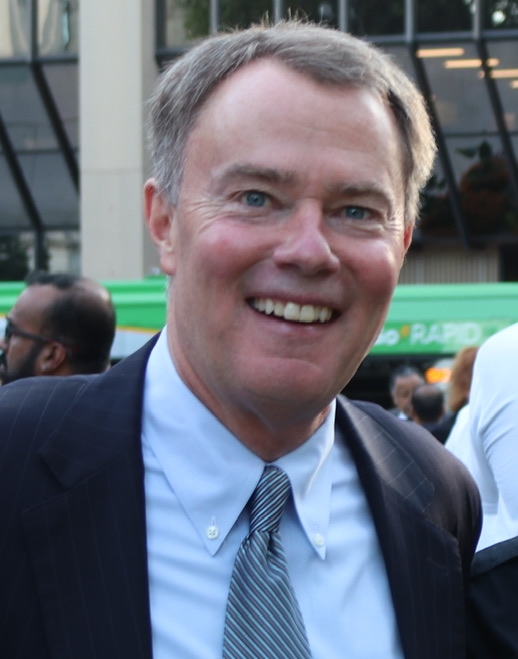
Joe Hogsett, 49th mayor of Indianapolis

The Mayor of Indianapolis is the chief executive and administrative officer of both the city and county. The mayor's chief duties include ensuring city-county ordinances are executed and enforced in accordance with applicable state and local law; appointing department heads and one or more deputy mayors, subject to City-County Council approval; and supervising the work of the city-county's departments, special taxing districts, and special service districts. The mayor is directly elected by popular vote for four-year, unlimited terms.

==== Departments ====
- Indianapolis Department of Business and Neighborhood Services (BNS)
- Indianapolis Department of Metropolitan Development (DMD)
- Indianapolis Department of Parks and Recreation (Indy Parks)
- Indianapolis Department of Public Works (DPW)
- Indianapolis Fire Department (IFD)
- Indianapolis Metropolitan Police Department (IMPD)

==== Offices ====
- Office of Audit and Performance
- Office of Corporation Counsel
- Office of Education Innovation
- Office of Finance and Management (City Controller)
- Office of Minority and Women Business Development
- Office of Public Health and Safety

=== County administration ===
Heads of county offices are elected by the citizens of both Indianapolis and Marion County.

==== Offices ====
- Marion County Assessor's Office
- Marion County Auditor's Office
- Marion County Clerk's Office
- Marion County Coroner's Office
- Marion County Prosecutor's Office
- Marion County Recorder's Office
- Marion County Sheriff's Office
- Marion County Surveyor's Office
- Marion County Treasurer's Office

==== Boards and agencies ====
- Marion County Board of Commissioners
- Marion County Board of Voters Registration
- Marion County Election Board
- Marion County Public Defender Agency
- State of Indiana Division of Family Resources
- Indianapolis–Marion County Forensic Services Agency
- Information Services Agency

==== Municipal corporations ====
The city-county contains seven independent municipal corporations established by Indiana Code.

- Capital Improvement Board of Marion County (CIB)
- Health and Hospital Corporation of Marion County (HHC)
- Indianapolis Airport Authority
- Indianapolis–Marion County Building Authority
- Indianapolis–Marion County Public Library
- Indianapolis Public Improvement Bond Bank
- Indianapolis Public Transportation Corporation (IndyGo)

== Legislative branch ==
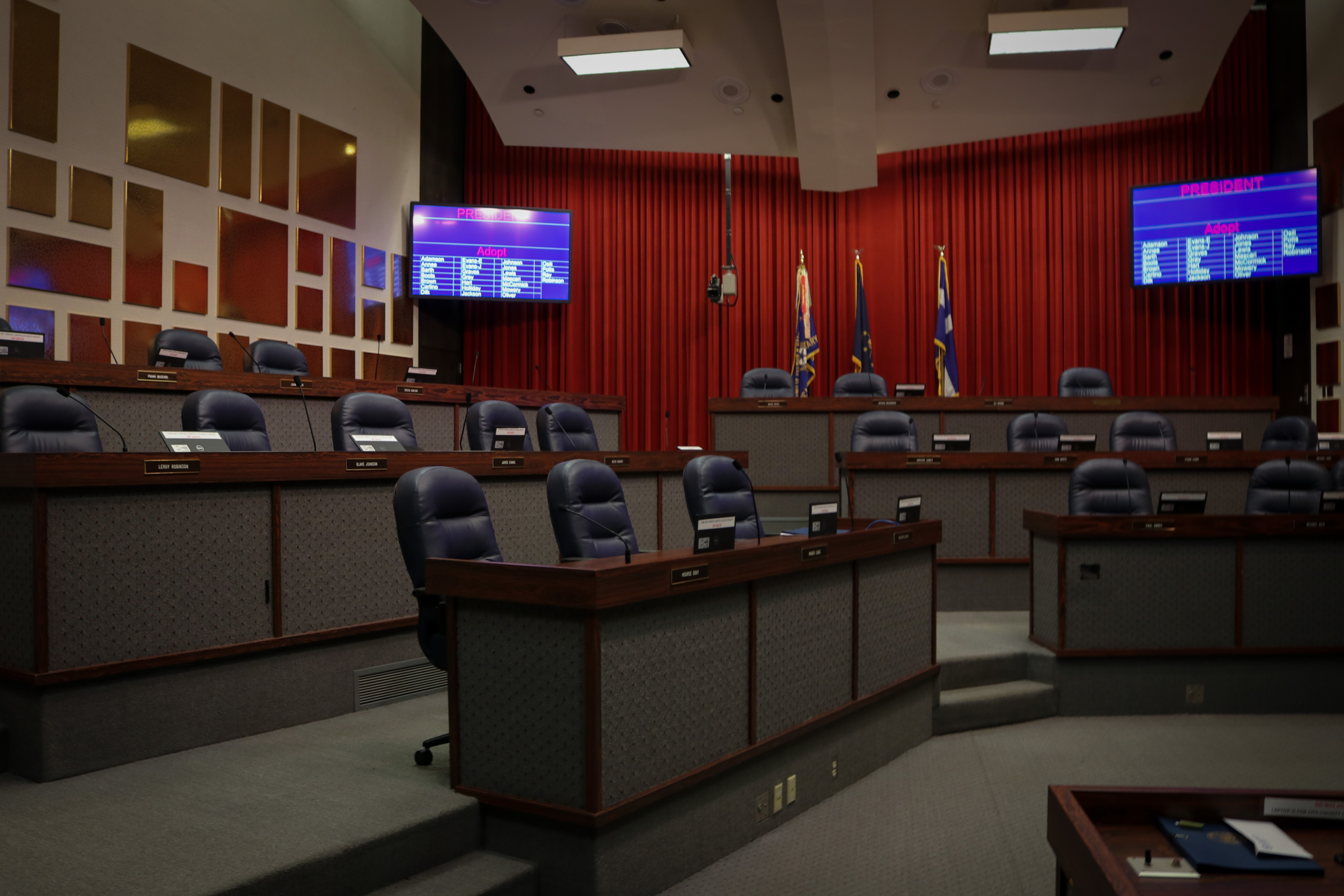
Beurt R. SerVaas Public Assembly Room in the City-County Building

Indianapolis City-County Council serves as the legislative body for both Indianapolis and Marion County. The council is composed of 25 members elected to four-year renewable terms, each representing an electoral district. The council is responsible for reviewing and adopting budgets and appropriations. It can also enact, repeal, or amend ordinances, and make appointments to certain boards and commissions, among other duties.

Prior to the 2015 Indianapolis City-County Council election, the council included four at-large seats, for a total of 29 seats. In 2013, the Indiana General Assembly passed Senate Enrolled Act 621 which, among other changes to city-county government, eliminated the council's four at-large seats. The controversial bill was signed into law by Governor Mike Pence.

== Judicial branch ==
- Marion Circuit Court
- Marion Superior Court

== Township government ==
Marion County includes nine units of township government: Center, Decatur, Franklin, Lawrence, Perry, Pike, Warren, Washington, and Wayne. Each township elects its own trustee, board, assessor, and a constable and small claims court judge. Officers serve four-year terms, not to exceed eight consecutive years. Township governments oversee a range of public services, including the disbursement of direct welfare relief, fire protection, and cemetery maintenance. Marion County's townships are unique in Indiana for operating small claims courts.

== State government ==
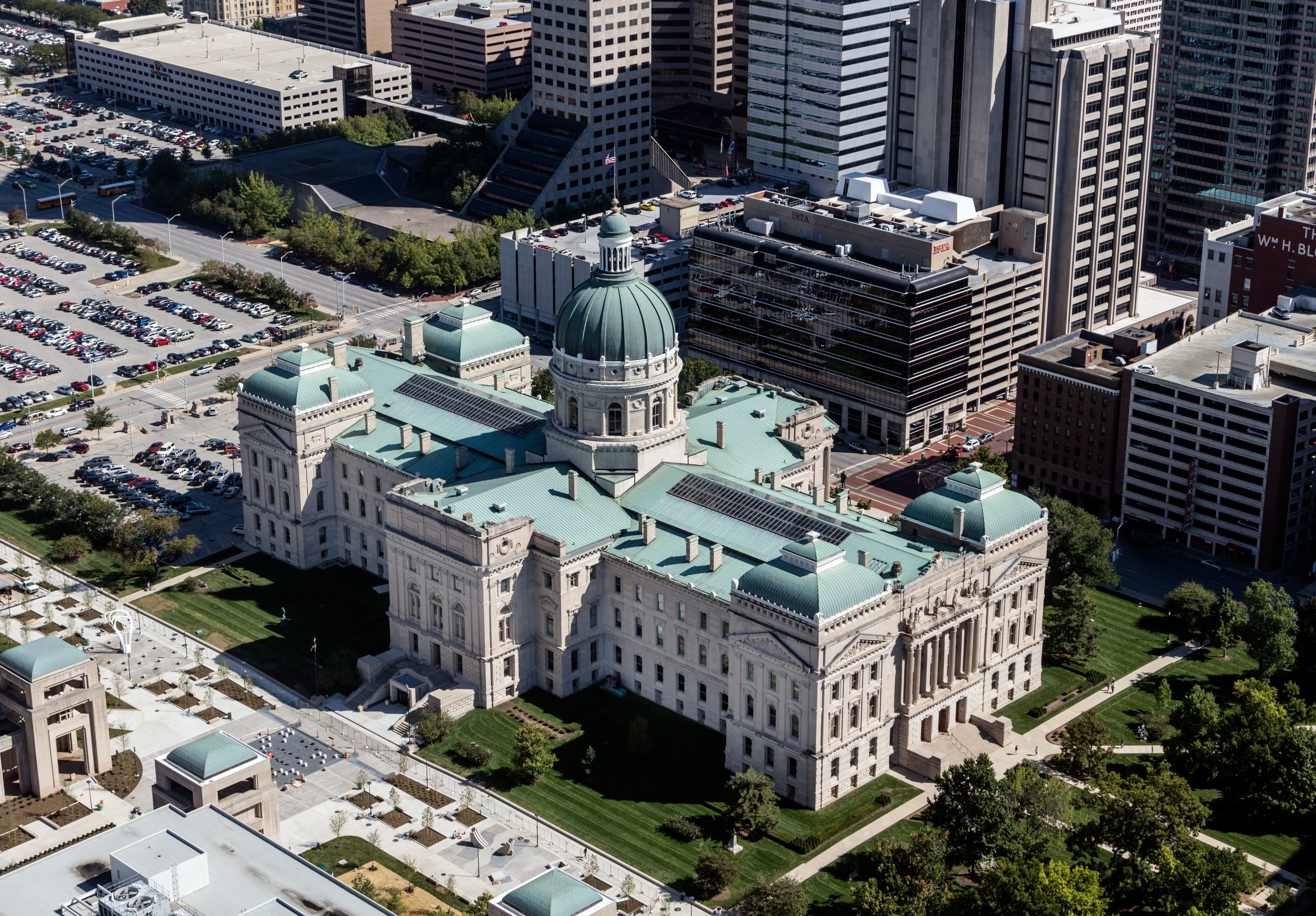
Indiana Statehouse in downtown Indianapolis
