= Ryan Mears =

American attorney and prosecutor in Indiana

Prosecuting Attorney of Marion County, Indiana
- Incumbent
- Assumed office October 5, 2019
- Preceded by: Terry Curry

Personal details
- Party: Democratic
- Education: Saint Joseph's College; Indiana University Robert H. McKinney School of Law (JD)

Ryan Mears is an American attorney and Democrat currently serving as the prosecuting attorney for Marion County, Indiana, which includes Indianapolis, since October 2019. He previously spent much of his legal career as a Marion County deputy prosecutor and became chief trial deputy before succeeding prosecutor Terry Curry.

Mears became acting prosecutor after Curry resigned for health reasons in September 2019 and was chosen the following month by a caucus of Democratic precinct committee members to complete Curry's term. He was elected to a full four-year term in 2022.

During his tenure, Mears has adopted policies declining prosecution of low-level marijuana possession and abortion-related offenses, established a conviction integrity unit, and expanded programs assisting residents with expungements and driver's-license reinstatement. His use of prosecutorial discretion has resulted in disagreements with state legislators and the police, particularly the Indianapolis Fraternal Order of Police.

== Early life ==
Mears grew up in Indianapolis and graduated from Cardinal Ritter High School. He attended Saint Joseph's College in Rensselaer, Indiana, where he played college basketball, and later earned his Juris Doctor from the Indiana University Robert H. McKinney School of Law.

Mears graduated from the IU Robert H. McKinney School of Law in 2006. After law school, he joined the Marion County Prosecutor's Office. Mears served as a deputy prosecutor from 2006 to 2014, spent approximately a year in private practice, and returned to the prosecutor's office in 2015.

== Legal career ==
As a deputy prosecutor, Mears handled a range of criminal prosecutions. The Indiana Prosecuting Attorneys Council has stated he tried more than 100 jury and bench trials before becoming prosecutor. He eventually became chief trial deputy, supervising criminal prosecutions while continuing to carry cases.

Before becoming the elected prosecutor, Mears was involved with initiatives addressing consequences of criminal convictions. He helped coordinate a 2019 Second Chance Workshop offering assistance with expungements and suspended driver's licenses.

== Tenure as Marion County prosecutor ==
=== Selection in 2019 ===
Mears became acting Marion County prosecutor on September 23, 2019, when Terry Curry resigned while undergoing treatment for prostate cancer. Because the vacancy occurred during Curry's elected term, Democratic precinct committee members were responsible for choosing a replacement.

Mears faced Tim Moriarty, then special counsel to Indianapolis mayor Joe Hogsett. Moriarty received support from Hogsett and U.S. Representative André Carson, while Curry supported Mears. On October 5, 2019, the caucus selected Mears, who was sworn in the same day.

=== Marijuana-possession policy ===
On September 30, 2019, while serving as acting prosecutor, Mears announced that his office would generally no longer file criminal charges against adults for possession of less than one ounce of marijuana. Mears stated that the policy was intended to redirect prosecutors and police resources toward violent crime and address racial disparities in marijuana enforcement. WRTV reported shortly after the announcement that 148 pending possession cases had been dismissed under the new policy.

The decision did not change Indiana state law. Then-IMPD chief Bryan Roach said officers would continue making marijuana arrests at their discretion, arguing that marijuana investigations could lead police to evidence of other offenses. The Indianapolis Fraternal Order of Police similarly said officers should continue enforcing state marijuana law.

Mears later defended the policy in interviews, saying that the high rate at which such cases had already been dismissed suggested prosecution was an inefficient use of resources.

=== Second Chance programs ===
Mears expanded programs to assist people with expungements. In 2020, WFYI reported that the office was expanding its Second Chance Workshops, which connected residents with attorneys who could assist with expungement and license-restoration matters. These programs included assistance with expungement, suspended driver's licenses and child-support issues.

=== Conviction Integrity Unit ===
In December 2020, Mears announced creation of a Conviction Integrity Unit to review credible claims of wrongful conviction, with the program beginning reviews in 2021. WFYI described it at its launch as the first initiative of its kind in Indiana. By 2024, the unit had received more than 500 applications and had taken approximately ten cases to a more extensive reinvestigation stage. One of the unit's most prominent cases was that of Leon Benson, who had been imprisoned for more than two decades for a 1998 murder. Benson's conviction was vacated and the case dismissed in March 2023 following a reinvestigation by the Unit.

=== Hate crime reporting ===
In 2021, Mears' office established a hotline for reports of possible hate-motivated crimes. The office said the hotline was intended to reduce barriers to reporting and connect complainants with a victim advocate.

=== Abortion prosecution policy ===
After the U.S. Supreme Court's June 2022 decision in Dobbs v. Jackson Women's Health Organization, Mears said that his office did not intend to prosecute abortion providers or women seeking abortion. He joined a national statement signed by prosecutors opposing criminal prosecution of abortion patients and providers. Critics argued a locally elected prosecutor should evaluate violations individually rather than announce a policy not to prosecute a state law.

== Disputes over prosecutorial discretion ==
Mears's office policies have made him a recurring subject of debate in the Indiana General Assembly over the power of locally elected prosecutors.

In January 2020, an Indiana Senate committee advanced legislation that would have allowed the state attorney general to appoint a special prosecutor when a local prosecutor announced a policy against prosecuting a particular offense. The proposal was widely understood as a response to Mears's marijuana policy. The proposal did not advance through the full Senate that session.

Lawmakers continued considering mechanisms for overriding categorical non-prosecution policies. During a 2022 legislative study, lawmakers cited Mears' office policies when considering whether another prosecutor should receive authority to pursue cases declined by an elected county prosecutor. The Indiana Prosecuting Attorneys Council opposed proposals intruding on prosecutorial discretion.

In 2025, the General Assembly considered legislation creating a formal process for reviewing prosecutors accused of categorically declining to enforce criminal statutes. The Indiana Capital Chronicle reported earlier efforts had specifically cited Mears's policies. During Senate consideration, the Prosecuting Attorneys Council supported other portions of the legislation but opposed creation of the review board. The resulting law established a Prosecutor Review Board and defined circumstances in which a prosecutor may be deemed a noncompliant prosecuting attorney. Mears argued the legislation was targeted at his office.

== Relationship with police ==
Mears's relationship with Indianapolis law enforcement has included both routine cooperation with the Indianapolis Metropolitan Police Department (IMPD) and repeated public disputes with union leadership.

=== Marijuana enforcement disagreement ===
After Mears' 2019 marijuana policy announcement, IMPD chief Bryan Roach said the department would continue to enforce Indiana marijuana law despite the prosecutor's decision not to charge many possession cases. Roach said marijuana possession remained illegal and argued marijuana enforcement sometimes provided police with a means of uncovering other crimes.

The Indianapolis FOP also backed continued enforcement. WRTV reported that Snyder said the union understood Roach to have instructed officers to keep enforcing state possession laws while officials examined the consequences of Mears's policy. Mears, by contrast, argued police resources devoted to low-level possession were better directed toward violent offenses.

=== FedEx shooting controversy ===
The relationship between Mears and IMPD leadership became particularly contentious after the Indianapolis FedEx shooting in April 2021. Gunman Brandon Scott Hole had come to police attention in March 2020 when his mother warned authorities that he might attempt "suicide by cop". IMPD detained Hole and seized a shotgun, but Mears's office did not pursue a judicial determination under Indiana's firearm-seizure law which would have prohibited him from acquiring additional firearms.

Hole later legally purchased the rifles used in the FedEx attack. Mears said his office had not believed it had sufficient evidence and time to prevail in a red-flag proceeding and argued that a failed proceeding could have required authorities to return Hole's seized shotgun. Chief Snyder disputed the prosecutor's explanation and argued that Mears's office should have taken the case to a judge rather than declining to file the red-flag petition.

=== 2022 FOP vote of no confidence ===
In August 2022, the Indianapolis FOP conducted a vote of confidence concerning Mears and the Marion County court system. The union said the vote reflected frustration among officers with what it described as a "revolving door" criminal-justice system, citing cases in which defendants or previously convicted people were accused of subsequent violent crimes.

The FOP reported that approximately 99 percent of participating officers voted they had no confidence in Mears and approximately 97 percent voted no confidence in the court system. The vote occurred during Mears's 2022 reelection campaign and was cited by Republican challenger Cyndi Carrasco as evidence of problems in the prosecutor's relationship with law enforcement. Mears responded during the campaign that his prosecutors and IMPD detectives continued working together on homicide and other criminal cases despite his disagreements with FOP leadership.

=== Prosecutions of IMPD officers ===
Mears's office has extensively prosecuted and investigated IMPD officers.

In August 2020, a Marion County grand jury indicted IMPD officers Jonathan Horlock and Nathanial Schauwecker over their conduct during arrests at racial-justice protests in downtown Indianapolis in May 2020. Horlock faced charges including battery, perjury, obstruction of justice and official misconduct, while Schauwecker faced battery and official-misconduct charges.

Mears said the question was whether the officers' force had been reasonable, while attorneys for the officers maintained their conduct was consistent with police training. At trial in December 2023, a jury acquitted both officers on several charges and was unable to reach verdicts on remaining counts.

Mears's office also prosecuted IMPD officer Robert Lawson following a 2019 confrontation with a student outside Shortridge High School. A jury convicted Lawson in 2021 of perjury, false informing and official misconduct while acquitting him of battery. A judge later vacated the convictions and sentenced Lawson to probation.

In April 2023, a Marion County grand jury indicted IMPD officers Adam Ahmad and Steven Sanchez in connection with the 2022 death of Herman Whitfield III, who died after police responded to his parents' home during a mental-health crisis. Charges included involuntary manslaughter, reckless homicide and battery offenses. After a five-day trial in December 2024, a jury acquitted both officers on all charges.

A separate Marion County grand jury indicted IMPD officers Carl Chandler and Alexander Gregory over the December 2022 shooting of Anthony Maclin, who had been sleeping in a vehicle. The officers were charged with felony battery and criminal recklessness offenses. The officers pleaded not guilty; their attorneys maintained they perceived Maclin as reaching for a firearm, while Maclin's attorneys disputed that account.

Mears did not retain each police shooting investigation handled during his tenure. Following the May 2020 fatal police shooting of Dreasjon Reed, Mears asked a court to appoint a special prosecutor because then-IMPD chief Randal Taylor was considered a material witness, which Mears said created a conflict for his office. A grand jury declined to indict the officer.

=== 2026 statewide FOP vote ===
The dispute with organized police resurfaced in June 2026, when delegates of the statewide Indiana Fraternal Order of Police approved a vote of no confidence in Mears. The union accused Mears of contributing to a "revolving door" justice system through plea agreements and policies that it considered insufficiently punitive toward repeat offenders. Mears's office described the vote as a political stunt.

== Elections ==
=== 2022 ===
Republican attorney Cyndi Carrasco announced a challenge to Mears in January 2022. The campaign focused heavily on violent crime, prosecutorial discretion, marijuana enforcement, abortion, plea agreements, the prosecutor's relationship with law enforcement and the FedEx red-flag controversy. Mears won the November 8, 2022, election with approximately 59 percent of the vote, defeating Carrasco, who received approximately 41 percent.

=== 2026 ===
Mears announced in January 2026 he would seek another term as Marion County prosecutor. Republican Philip Foust, a former Marion County deputy prosecutor and Speedway clerk-treasurer, was unopposed for the Republican nomination. During the campaign, Foust criticized Mears's approach to juvenile crime. Mears has opposed a 2026 Indiana law restricting long-term camping on public property, describing it as difficult to implement.

== Personal life ==
Mears is married to Shannon White Mears and has two sons.

== See also ==
- Marion County, Indiana
- Indianapolis Metropolitan Police Department
- Prosecutorial discretion
- Indianapolis FedEx shooting
