= Flag of Indianapolis =

Indianapolis
- Proportion: 2:3 or 3:5
- Adopted: May 20, 1963; 63 years ago
- Design: A white star within a red circle within a white circle, with four white stripes moving outward perpendicularly, on a field of dark blue.
- Designed by: Roger E. Gohl

The flag of Indianapolis has a dark blue field with a white five-pointed star pointing upwards in the center. Around the star is a circular field in red. Surrounding the red field is a white ring, from which extend four white stripes from top to bottom and from hoist to fly, thus creating four equal quadrants in the field. The stripes are about one-seventh the width of the flag, with the white ring the same width as the stripes. The diameter of the red circle is about two-ninths the width of the flag.

The flag design was adopted by the city of Indianapolis on May 20, 1963. The flag was first raised from the City-County Building on November 7, 1963. It was designed by John Herron Art Institute student Roger E. Gohl.

== History ==
=== First and second flag ===
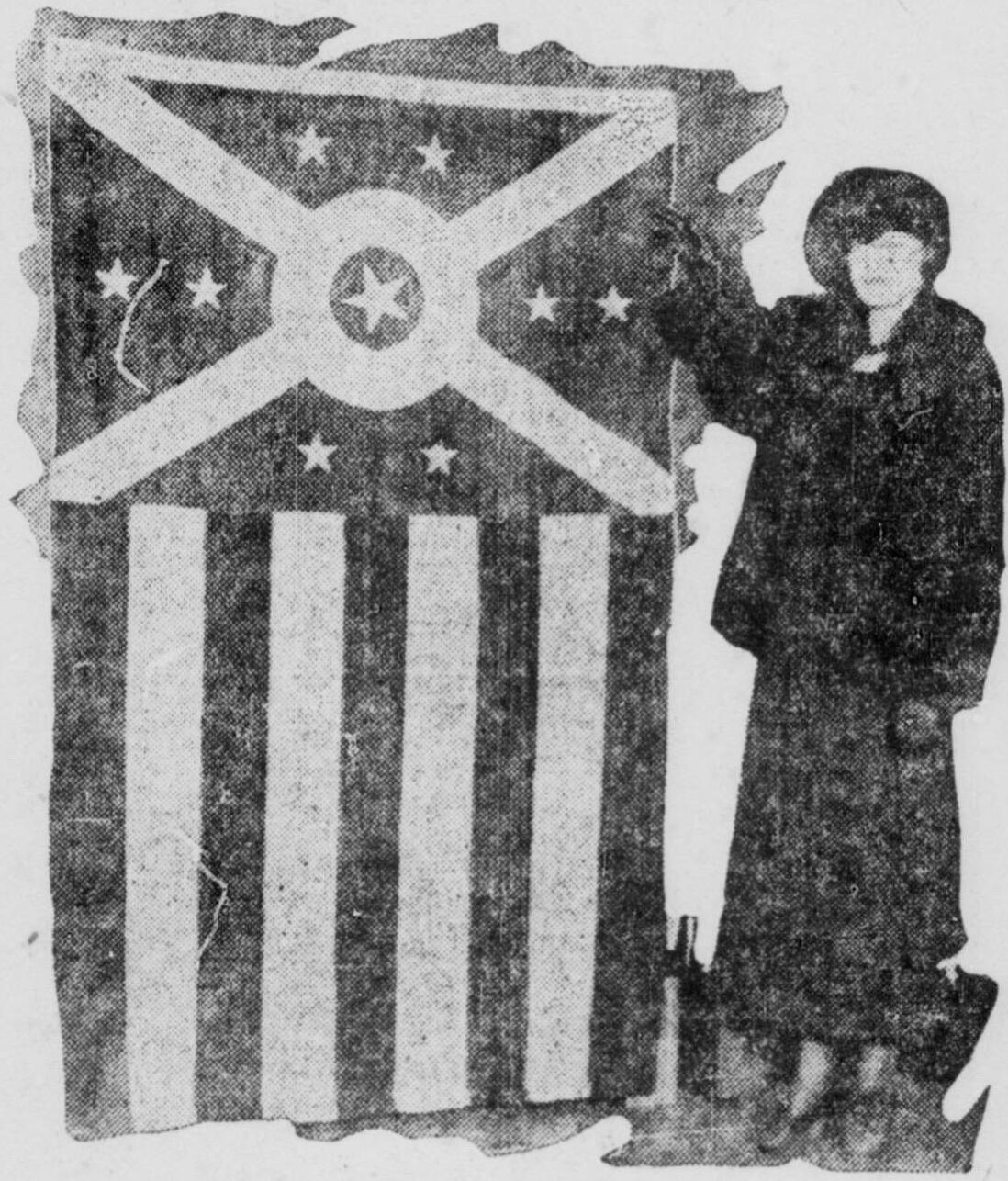
The initial design of the flag of Indianapolis from a 1925 photo

First flag of Indianapolis (1911–1915)

The city's first municipal flag was designed by city council member William Johnson in 1911 and approved by a commission appointed by Mayor Samuel "Lew" Shank. The flag's unveiling was scheduled for July 4, 1911; however, it was reported that no one attended the ceremony as most residents were elsewhere greeting President William Howard Taft who was visiting Indianapolis for the Independence Day holiday.

Second flag of Indianapolis (1915–1963)

A revised version of the first flag was designed by Harry B. Dynes and adopted by Common Council on June 21, 1915. The flag's design appears to draw inspiration from the American flag. The design divided the flag vertically into two sections. The first section (two-fifths of the flag's length) displays a dark blue field overlaid by a white ring with four white diagonal spokes radiating toward each of the section's four corners, representing the city's four diagonal avenues from Alexander Ralston's 1821 Plat of the Town of Indianapolis (Indiana, Kentucky, Massachusetts, and Virginia) meeting at Monument Circle. Eight white stars set in this section represent the city's four appointed boards (public works, public safety, health, and parks) and four elected officers (city clerk, controller, judge, and board of school commissioners). A large white star centered on the circle is overlaid by the city's corporate seal in gold, representing the mayor. Nine horizontal stripes occupy the remaining three-fifths of the flag, alternating red and white, representing each common council seat.

The flag proved unpopular, having never been fabricated until 1960. The design's shortcomings included a tiny city seal that was difficult to decipher, eight seemingly arbitrary stars, and a visual resemblance to variants of the Confederate battle flag.

=== Third flag ===
In 1962, city leaders recognized the need for a modern flag. The Greater Indianapolis Information Committee sponsored a contest to create a new one, with a prize of $50 and lunch with Mayor Albert H. Losche for the winning entrant. A three-person selection committee was composed of Richard Beck, art director for Eli Lilly and Company; Pierre & Wright architect, Edward D. Pierre; and Wilbur D. Peat, painter, writer, and director of the Indianapolis Museum of Art. Designs were judged on criteria of "simplicity, good visibility, and appropriateness".

Roger E. Gohl, an 18-year-old student at the John Herron Art Institute, submitted a design after one of his instructors, Loren Dunlap, encouraged his students to enter. Gohl's winning design was selected from a pool of 75 submissions. Unlike the flag's current symmetric cross design, Gohl's original design had the circle and vertical stripe offset to the left rather than being centered; he was unaware of the change until he returned to visit the city in 1969.

Gohl gave the original school flag project to Michael Green, the Founder of Flags For Good, before he died in 2024. The flag is now displayed inside Flags For Good's Flagship Store & Headquarters as part of a mini museum to the history of the Indianapolis flag.

A 2004 survey of flag design quality by the North American Vexillological Association ranked Indianapolis's flag 8th best of 150 American city flags. It earned a score 8.35 out of 10.

== Design and symbolism ==
Section 105-2. of the Revised Code of the Consolidated City and County ("City flag adopted and described.") establishes the design as follows:

First: A large white star in the center of the red circle area, representing the Soldiers and Sailors Monument, and that Indianapolis is the capital of the State of Indiana;
Second: A large white circle around the red area, representing the Monument Circle area of the city;
Third: Four (4) white stripes outward from the large white circle, representing North Meridian Street to the north, East Market Street to the east, South Meridian Street to the south; and West Market Street to the west;
Fourth: Deep blue color areas to the northeast, southeast, northwest and southwest, representing the residential areas of the city;
Fifth: Red, white and blue represents the colors in the American flag and the patriotism of the inhabitants of the city;
Sixth: Red in the circle, particularly, represents the driving energy and urge for progress that has made the city race ahead.

=== Inconsistency ===
According to municipal code, the four white stripes radiating from the center white circle represent the streets of Market and Meridian, which intersect with Monument Circle. However, in media accounts, the stripes are said to represent the intersection of Meridian and Washington streets (half a block south of Monument Circle), allegedly a nod to the city's official slogan of the Crossroads of America.

== Use ==
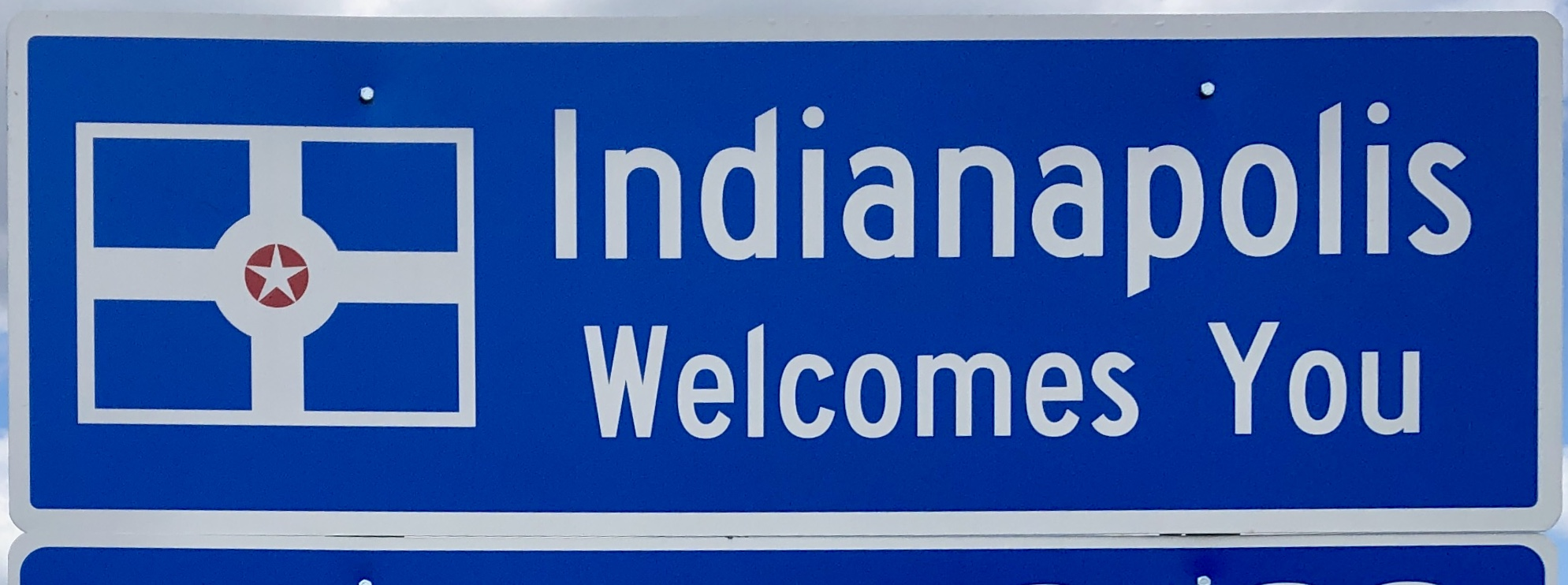
A city welcome sign prominently features the flag

The flag is flown on the Washington Street (south) side of the City-County Building, at some local government properties, stadiums, and office buildings. It is also depicted on the city's welcome signs.

According to local media accounts in 2011 and 2012, the flag was "scarcely used aside from adorning certain city vehicles, like salt trucks" and "unfamiliar to most city residents." Further, one interviewee said that "there's some confusion as to what the city seal or symbol or logo actually is. The mayor's letterhead has one thing on it, the police cars have another, and the city website has still another."

In the ensuing decade, the flag became more prominent in both civic and private spaces. An Indianapolis Star article in 2017 remarked "you see it [the flag] everywhere — on poles, on city trucks, on millenials' [sic] T-shirts." Adopted in 2013, the team colors and insignia for the Indy Eleven of the United Soccer League directly reference the flag's red, white, and blue color scheme—specifically, the white star emblem centered on the red circle. In 2018, the city's relaunched website incorporated the flag's color scheme and elements. Inspired by the 1962 flag design competition, the city held a contest to select a design for the city's 2020–2021 bicentennial logo. The selected design was influenced by the flag's features.

== See also ==
- Flag of Indiana
