= Nicknames of Indianapolis =

Bynames of the city in Indiana, US

There are many nicknames for the city of Indianapolis, the largest city in Indiana and 16th-largest city in the United States. The city's nicknames reflect its geography, economy, transportation, demographics, and popular culture, including sports and music. They are often used by the media and in popular culture to reference the city.

The city does not have an official nickname. However, it has adopted an official slogan, the "Crossroads of America", which is also the official state motto of Indiana. The city's most popular unofficial nickname is "Indy", an abbreviation capturing the first two syllables of Indianapolis.

== Popular nicknames ==
=== 317 ===
Established in 1947, 317 is the area code for the Indianapolis area.

=== Circle City ===
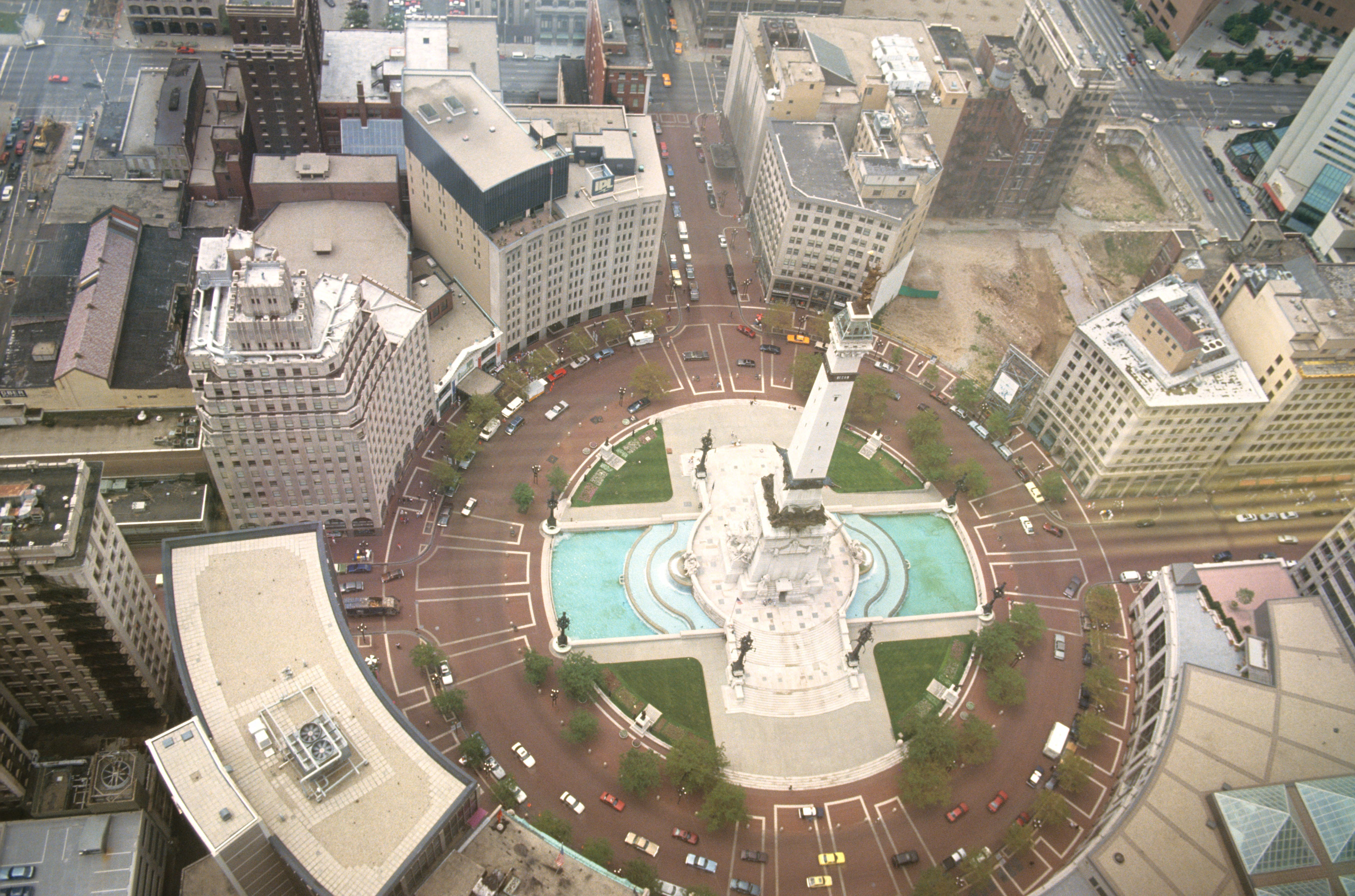
Aerial perspective of Monument Circle, circa 1990

The "Circle City" nickname originates from the distinctive 1821 plan of Indianapolis by Alexander Ralston and Elias Pym Fordham. Monument Circle (originally, Governor's Circle) is the traffic circle and focal point of the Mile Square plan of Indianapolis. Since 1902, Monument Circle has been home to the Soldiers’ and Sailors’ Monument.

=== Crossroads of America ===
"Crossroads of America" was first used in reference to the numerous railroads that intersected Indianapolis in the late 19th century. In the 20th century, the moniker evolved to reference the city's proximity to important highways. First adopted in 1937 as the state of Indiana's official state motto, it was later adopted as the city's official slogan in 1988.

=== IND ===
"IND" is the IATA airport code for Indianapolis International Airport and the Amtrak station code for Indianapolis Union Station. It is also used by scoreboard and/or statistics line abbreviations for sports franchises based in Indianapolis.

=== Indy ===
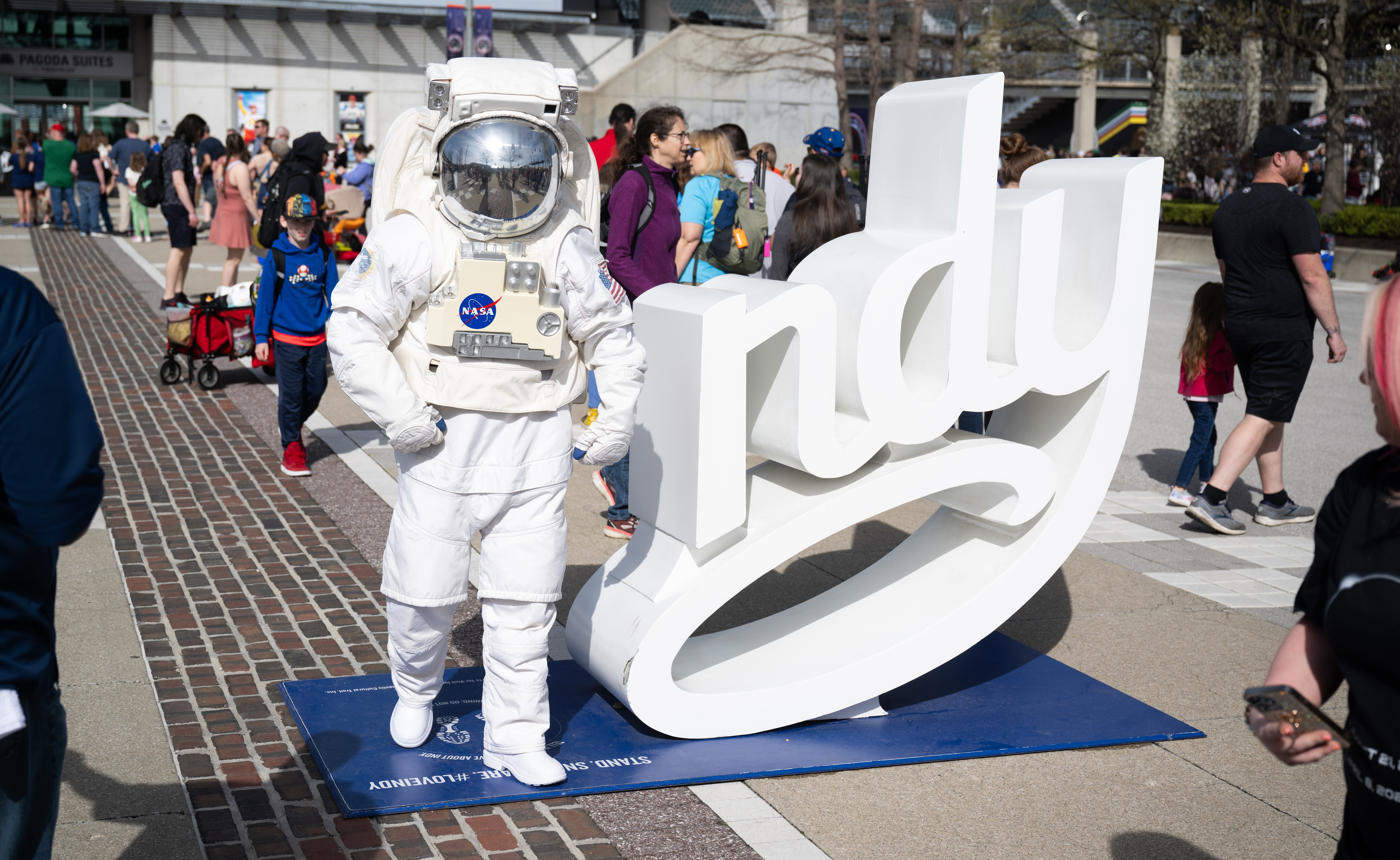
"I Am Indy" sculpture photo op at Indianapolis Motor Speedway during festivities for the solar eclipse of April 8, 2024

An abbreviation capturing the first two syllables of IN-dee-ə-NAP-ə-lis, "Indy" is the city's most widely used nickname, commonly reflected in the names of public agencies (e.g., Indy Parks and IndyGo), events (e.g., Indy Film Fest and Indy Pride Festival), media (e.g., IndyStar), sports franchises (e.g., Indy Eleven and Indy Fuel), and the city's destination marketing organization, Visit Indy. The city's official website is indy.gov.

=== Naptown ===
The term's original meaning is disputed. According to reporting from Indianapolis Monthly, the earliest reference to "Naptown" is from a 1927 Indianapolis Recorder article about jazz musicians. The term was coined as early as the 1920s by African American Jazz performers, stressing the fourth syllable in IN-dee-ə-NAP-ə-lis.

The term later evolved as a pejorative term for the city's perceived dullness or sleepiness. Humorist Will Rogers described the city as "the only farm I've ever seen with a monument in the center".

== Historic nicknames ==
=== Indianoplace or India-no-place ===
These variations originated in the 1960s as pejorative terms referring to the city's perceived dullness or provincial attitudes.

=== Railroad City ===
The nickname "Railroad City", or "City of Railroads", was first used in the Indianapolis Locomotive of September 1849, two years after the arrival of the Indianapolis and Madison Railroad and four years before the opening of the world's first union station in the city. It was frequently used through the 1870s.

== Subculture and groups ==
=== Chindianapolis ===
"Chindianapolis," a blending of Chin and Indianapolis, refers to the city's growing population of Chin people.

=== No Mean City ===
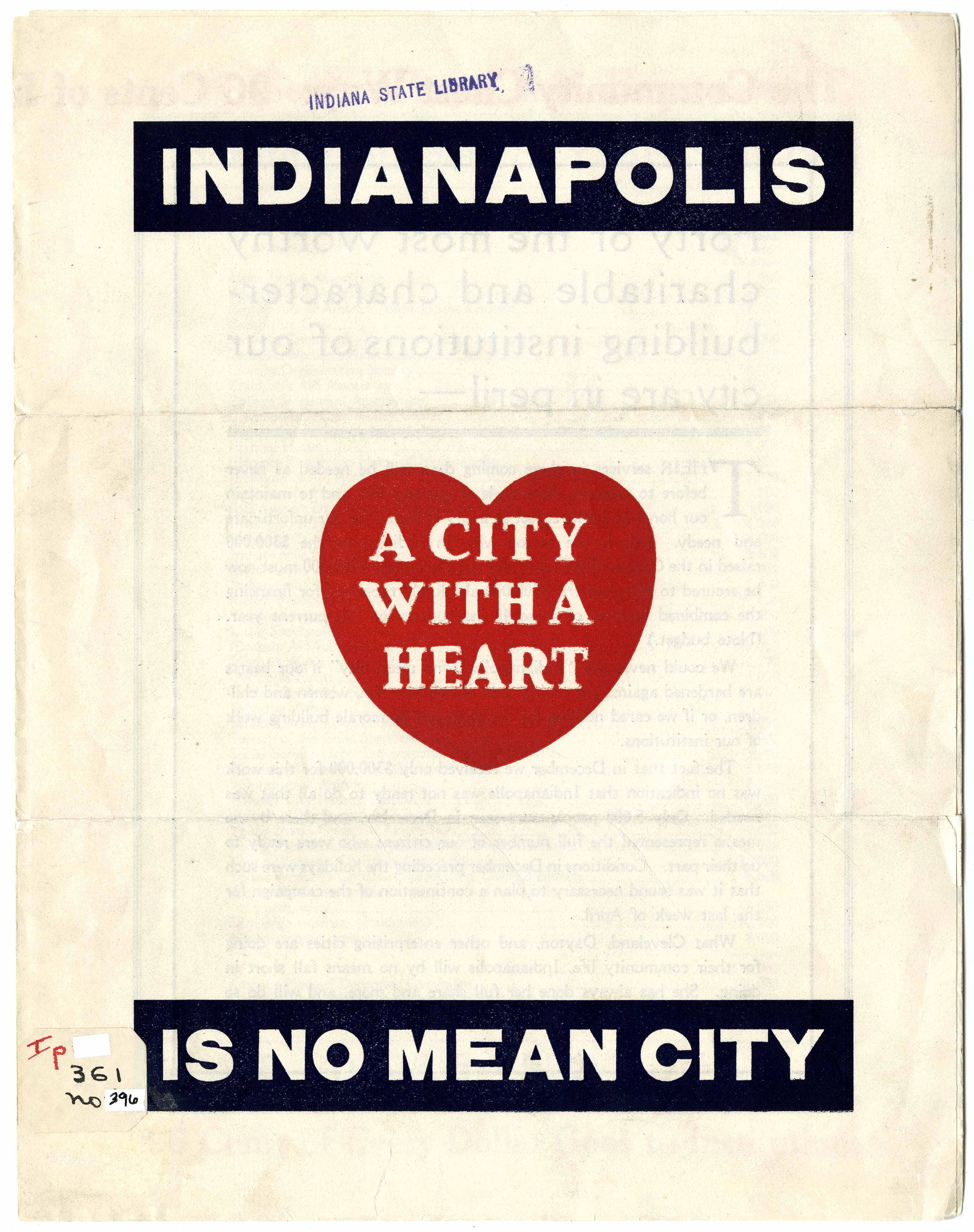
A pamphlet about the Indianapolis Community Chest prominently features the “No Mean City" moniker in 1921.

"No Mean City" originates from the Christian Bible (KJV), Acts 21:39: "But Paul said, 'I am a man which am a Jew of Tarsus, a city in Cilicia, a citizen of no mean city: and, I beseech thee, suffer me to speak unto the people.'" In this context, "no mean city" refers to a city that is not insignificant.

Indianapolis resident and former U.S. president Benjamin Harrison borrowed the verse in a 1897 speech: "I am, myself, a citizen of no mean city." This was later echoed by local politicians, including Mayor Charles A. Bookwalter (1901–1903; 1906–1910). On July 27, 1909, Bookwalter presided over ceremonies for the cornerstone laying of the new City Hall, inscribed with Harrison's quote.

The slogan resurfaced in 2015 by opponents of Indiana's Religious Freedom Restoration Act, invoking "No Mean City" to represent a welcoming and inclusive city.

== Marketing slogans ==
=== Amateur Sports Capital of the World ===
The "Amateur Sports Capital of the World" moniker came to prominence in the 1980s as the city promoted itself as a sports tourism destination amidst capital investments in sports facilities and bids to host major events. Several amateur sports associations have been or are currently based in the city, including the Amateur Athletic Union (1970–1996), the National Collegiate Athletic Association, and the National Federation of State High School Associations (1999–present).

=== Cinderella of the Rust Belt ===
"Cinderella of the Rust Belt" was coined by Newsweek in its September 9, 1985, issue. The brief article, "A Rust-Belt Relic's New Shine," featured local leaders and touted revitalization efforts underway in Indianapolis at the time.

=== Racing Capital of the World ===
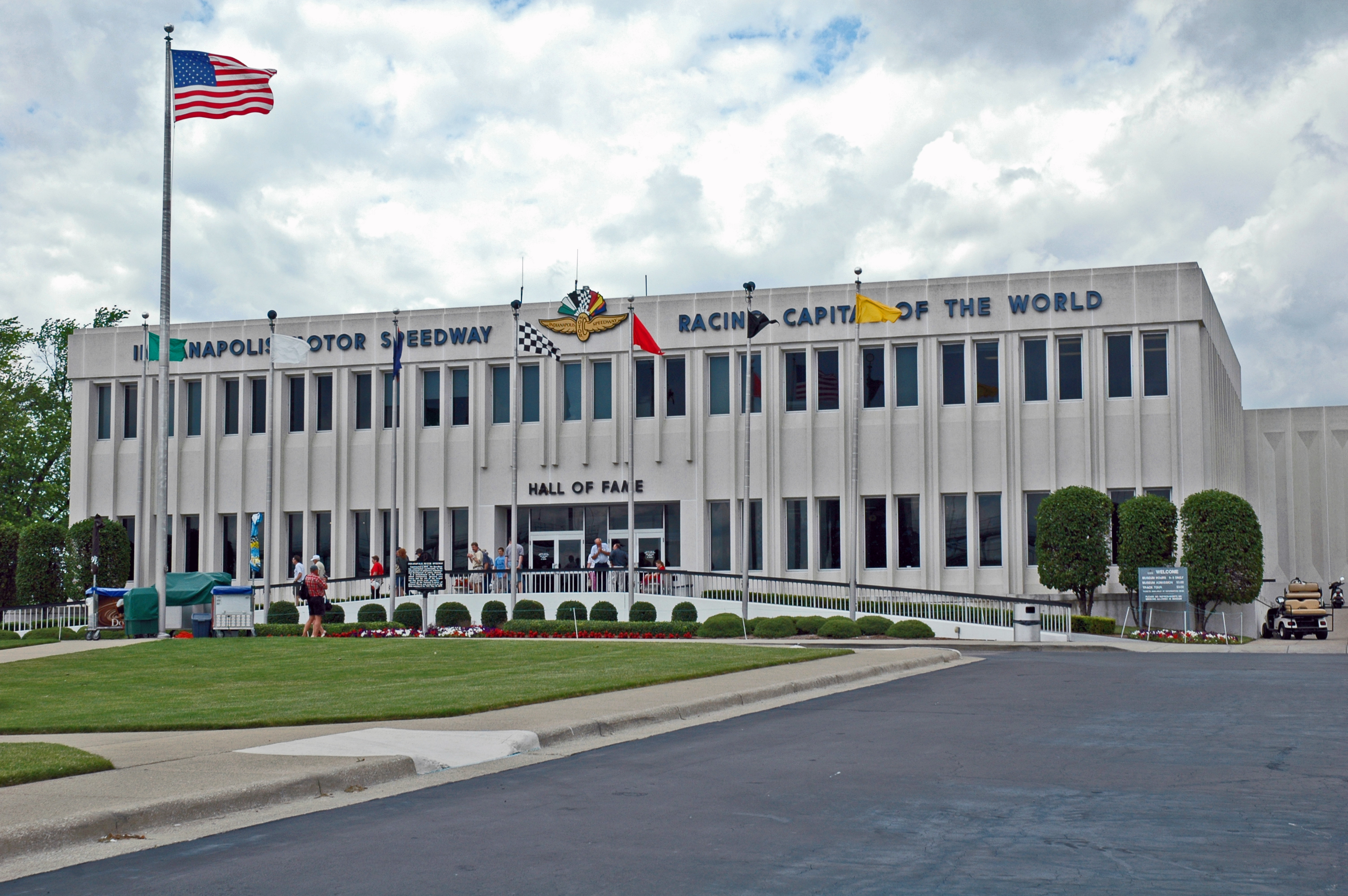
Indianapolis Motor Speedway Museum in Speedway. The "Racing Capital of the World" moniker is visible on the museum's front facade.

An official trademark of the Indianapolis Motor Speedway, the "Racing Capital of the World" is sometimes extended to the city of Indianapolis or the state of Indiana. The Indianapolis metropolitan area is a global center for auto racing, home to numerous motorsports facilities and events, two sanctioning bodies (INDYCAR and United States Auto Club), and more than 500 motorsports-related companies.

== See also ==
- List of city nicknames in Indiana
