= Marion County Prosecutor's Office =

Prosecuting authority in Indiana, US

- Formation: April 1822
- Headquarters: 251 E. Ohio St., Suite 160; Indianapolis, Indiana
- Marion County Prosecuting Attorney: Ryan Mears
- Website: https://www.indy.gov/agency/marion-county-prosecutors-office

The Office of the Marion County Prosecuting Attorney, commonly known as the Marion County Prosecutor's Office (MCPO), is the prosecuting authority for Marion County, Indiana, and Indiana's 19th Judicial Circuit. The office represents the State of Indiana in criminal proceedings in Marion County and also administers juvenile, traffic, victim-services, post-conviction, and child-support functions. The current Marion County Prosecuting Attorney is Ryan Mears, a member of the Democratic Party. MCPO draws its authority from Article 7, Section 16 of the Indiana Constitution.

Although Indianapolis and Marion County consolidated many governmental functions through Unigov in 1970, the prosecutor remained a separately elected county officer. Other constitutional and county offices, including the sheriff, clerk, auditor, and treasurer, likewise remained outside the consolidated city's ordinary executive structure.

The office has drawn attention over the scope of prosecutorial discretion, relationships with police and the courts, implementation of Indiana's firearms laws, and the conduct of individual prosecutors, particularly Ryan Mears, the current officeholder. Since 2019, disputes over the office's policies on marijuana and abortion have also contributed to efforts in the Indiana General Assembly to create state-level review mechanisms for prosecutors who categorically decline to enforce particular criminal statutes.

== Organization ==
The office's structure has changed over time. Its budget describes trial teams handling major felonies, Level 6 felonies, and misdemeanor cases, along with prosecutors specializing in domestic violence, sex offenses, child abuse, narcotics, juvenile cases, traffic matters, grand-jury investigations, post-conviction litigation, and community outreach.

MCPO also operates a Child Support Division. Its responsibilities include establishing paternity and child-support orders, enforcing and modifying orders, and handling interstate child-support matters.

== Controversies ==
=== Racial disparities and charging practices ===
Questions about racial disparities in Marion County's criminal-justice system predate the current administration. In 2001, the Indiana Advisory Committee to the United States Commission on Civil Rights published a study examining prosecutorial decisions involving drug offenses and homicides under prosecutors Jeffrey Modisett and Scott Newman. The committee found Black Americans were disproportionately represented among Marion County prosecutions. The Commission stated it could not draw a statistically significant conclusion race itself affected prosecutorial charging decisions during the period studied. The committee instead identified concerns involving policing strategy, data collection, and public confidence, and recommended greater public access to criminal-justice data and additional study of charging and plea-bargaining decisions.

=== Marijuana non-prosecution policy ===
On September 30, 2019, Ryan Mears announced that MCPO would stop filing criminal charges for possession of less than one ounce of marijuana. Mears staed the change would conserve resources for violent-crime prosecutions and distinguish personal possession from drug dealing. At the time, Mears said the office had already dismissed approximately 80 percent of marijuana-possession charges presented that year. Indianapolis police said they would continue enforcing the state's marijuana statute. In 2020, Indiana legislators considered legislation that would have allowed the attorney general to seek appointment of a special prosecutor when a local prosecutor maintained a policy against prosecuting a category of offenses. The proposal was discussed in connection with the Marion County marijuana policy but did not become law that year.

=== FedEx shooting and Indiana's red-flag law ===
The office faced scrutiny following the April 2021 mass shooting at an Indianapolis FedEx facility, in which former employee Brandon Scott Hole killed eight people before killing himself.

In March 2020, more than a year before the shooting, Hole's mother contacted police because she feared that he might attempt "suicide by cop". Indianapolis police seized a shotgun from him under Indiana's firearm-seizure, or "red flag", law. The weapon was not returned, but no court hearing was sought to have Hole formally adjudicated as dangerous. Hole later legally purchased the rifles used in the FedEx shooting.

Mears said his office had not pursued a red-flag proceeding because prosecutors believed the available evidence and the statute's timetable made success uncertain. He also said that losing the case could have required authorities to return Hole's shotgun. Critics, including state legislators and the Indianapolis police union, argued that prosecutors should have allowed a judge to make the determination rather than declining to bring the case.

Subsequent investigative reporting by The Indianapolis Star raised broader questions about Marion County's handling of the law. The newspaper reported that the prosecutor's office substantially increased its red-flag filings in the weeks following the FedEx shooting and identified delays in some earlier cases. Marion Superior Court also changed its procedures so that police would submit an initial probable-cause affidavit directly to a judge rather than routing it first through the prosecutor's office.

The Star investigation of Indiana's red-flag system, which examined failures by both police and prosecutors, was named a finalist for the 2022 Pulitzer Prize for Local Reporting.

=== Abortion enforcement policy ===
Following the U.S. Supreme Court's 2022 decision in Dobbs v. Jackson Women's Health Organization, Mears announced that his office did not plan to prosecute women or physicians for abortion-related conduct. He said the office would continue directing its resources toward violent crime. Mears was among prosecutors nationally who signed a public statement opposing criminal prosecution of abortion patients and providers. This policy received criticism, since Mears later stated "I will not prosecute women."

A separate dispute arose when Mears sought to retain outside attorneys in litigation challenging Indiana's abortion law. A Monroe Circuit Court judge ruled in September 2022 that the Marion County prosecutor was a state officer for purposes of the litigation and that the Indiana Attorney General therefore had statutory authority to represent the office.

=== Disputes with the Indianapolis police union ===
Relations between the prosecutor's office, the Fraternal Order of Police Lodge 86, and the Indianapolis Metropolitan Police Department, have become contentious. In August 2022, the FOP announced that its members had voted "no confidence" in the Marion County prosecutor and the local court system, citing cases in which defendants accused or convicted of serious offenses later became suspects in attacks on police officers. Mears has further stated his office is independent of IMPD, and believes prosecutors and police should remain independent of one another.

== Community Justice Campus ==
Marion County's courts and jail operations moved from downtown Indianapolis to the Community Justice Campus in the Twin Aire area beginning in 2022. The campus includes Marion County courts, the jail, the Public Defender Agency, probation offices, and other justice services. The prosecutor's principal administrative offices did not relocate with the courts. Reporting in 2024 said a possible move remained under consideration, in part because of cost concerns.

== List of Marion County Prosecutors ==
Years in office	Prosecutor
1822–1823; 1825–1826	Calvin Fletcher
c. 1820s–1830s	Harvey Gregg
19th century	Hiram Brown
19th century	William Quarles
19th century	Philip Sweetser
19th century	James Morrison
19th century	Hugh O'Neal
19th century	David Wallace
19th century	Abram A. Hammond
1857	Jonathan W. Gordon
1858	Peter S. Kennedy
1858–1861	William P. Fishback
1862	John C. Bufkins
c. 1860s–1870s	John S. Duncan
1875	J. M. Cropsey
1876–c. 1878	James Epley Heller
c. 1878–1880	John B. Elam
c. 1882–1884	W. T. Brown
1884–1886	William Newton Harding
1886–1890	James L. Mitchell
c. 1890–1894	John W. Holtzman
c. 1894–1898	Charles S. Wiltsie
1898–1899	Orlando B. Iles
1899–1900	Edwin B. Pugh
c. 1901–1904	John C. Ruckelshaus
c. 1905–1906	Charles P. Benedict
c. 1907–1910	Elliott R. Hooten
c. 1911–1914	Frank P. Baker
c. 1915–1918	Alvah J. Rucker
c. 1919–1920	Claris Adams
1921–1924	William P. Evans
1925–1930	William H. Remy
1931–1934	Herbert E. Wilson
c. 1935–1938	Herbert M. Spencer
1939–1940	David M. Lewis
1941–1947	F. Sherwood Blue
c. 1948–1949	George S. Darley
1949–c. 1950	Judson L. Stark
c. 1951–1954	Frank H. Fairchild
1955–1958	John G. Tinder
1959–1962	Phillip L. Bayt
1963–1974	Noble R. Pearcy
1975–1978	James F. Kelley
1979–1990	Stephen Goldsmith
1991–1994	Jeffrey A. Modisett
1995–2002	Scott C. Newman
2003–2010	Carl Brizzi
2011–2019	Terry R. Curry
2019–present	Ryan Mears
