= List of law enforcement agencies in Indiana =

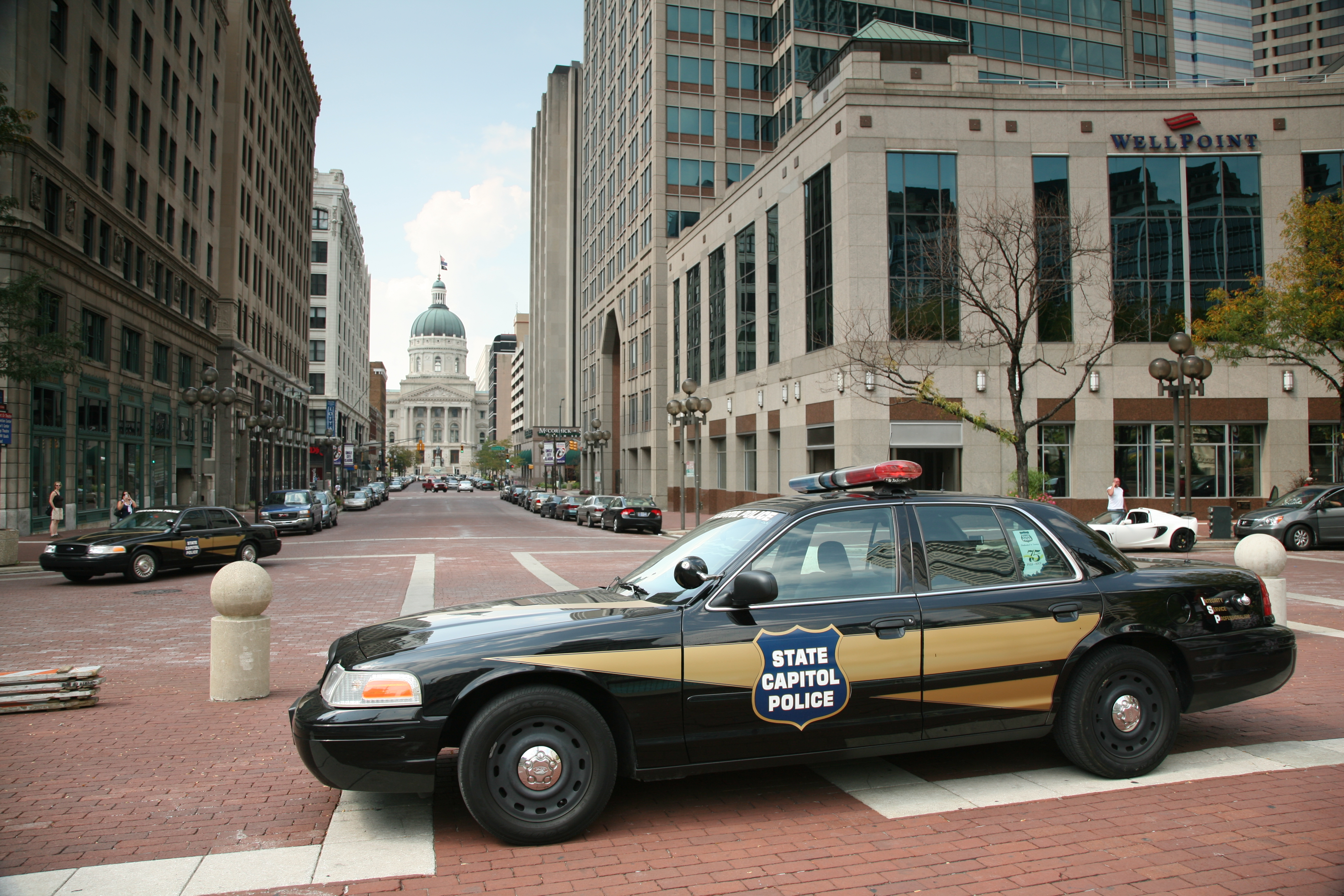
An Indiana State Capitol Police cruiser in Indianapolis.

This is a list of law enforcement agencies in the state of Indiana.

According to the US Bureau of Justice Statistics' 2008 Census of State and Local Law Enforcement Agencies, the state had 482 law enforcement agencies employing 13,171 sworn police officers, about 206 for each 100,000 residents.

Since 2012, the Indiana Law Enforcement Training Board (ILETB) has instituted a three-tier system of training for the state's various law enforcement agencies.

- Tier I: Full Basic Recruit Academy at one of the state's ILETB certified academies
- Tier II: Ten-week program held at the Indiana Law Enforcement Academy (ILEA) in Plainfield
- Tier III: Four-week program held at the ILEA in Plainfield

== State Agencies ==
=== Tier I State Agencies ===
- Indiana Department of Natural Resources
  - Indiana Department of Natural Resources Law Enforcement Division
- Indiana Law Enforcement Academy
- Indiana Office of Inspector General
- Indiana State Excise Police
- Indiana Department of Homeland Security
  - Indiana State Fire Marshal Division
- Indiana State Police

=== Tier II State Agencies ===
- Indiana Department of Correction
- Indiana Gaming Commission Office of Enforcement, Investigation, and Control
- Indiana State Police Capitol Police Section

=== Tier III State Agencies ===
- Indiana Attorney General's Office, Medicaid Fraud Control Unit
- Indiana Secretary of State, Securities Enforcement Division

== Tier I County Sheriff Agencies ==
- Adams County Sheriff's Office
- Allen County Sheriff's Office
- Bartholomew County Sheriff's Office
- Benton County Sheriff's Office
- Blackford County Sheriff's Office
- Boone County Sheriff's Office
- Brown County Sheriff's Office
- Carroll County Sheriff's Office
- Cass County Sheriff's Office
- Clark County Sheriff's Office
- Clay County Sheriff's Office
- Clinton County Sheriff's Office
- Crawford County Sheriff's Office
- Daviess County Sheriff's Office
- Dearborn County Sheriff's Office
- Decatur County Sheriff's Office
- DeKalb County Sheriff's Office
- Delaware County Sheriff's Office
- Dubois County Sheriff's Office
- Elkhart County Sheriff's Office
- Fayette County Sheriff's Office
- Floyd County Sheriff's Office
- Fountain County Sheriff's Office
- Franklin County Sheriff's Office
- Fulton County Sheriff's Office
- Gibson County Sheriff's Office
- Grant County Sheriff's Office
- Greene County Sheriff's Office
- Hamilton County Sheriff's Office
- Hancock County Sheriff's Office
- Harrison County Sheriff's Office
- Hendricks County Sheriff's Office
- Henry County Sheriff's Office
- Howard County Sheriff's Office
- Huntington County Sheriff's Office
- Jackson County Sheriff's Office
- Jasper County Sheriff's Office
- Jay County Sheriff's Office
- Jefferson County Sheriff's Office
- Jennings County Sheriff's Office
- Johnson County Sheriff's Office
- Knox County Sheriff's Office
- Kosciusko County Sheriff's Office
- LaGrange County Sheriff's Office
- Lake County Sheriff's Department
- La Porte County Sheriff's Office
- Lawrence County Sheriff's Office
- Madison County Sheriff's Office
- Marion County Sheriff's Office
- Marshall County Sheriff's Office
- Martin County Sheriff's Office
- Miami County Sheriff's Office
- Monroe County Sheriff's Office
- Montgomery County Sheriff's Office
- Morgan County Sheriff's Office
- Newton County Sheriff's Office
- Noble County Sheriff's Office
- Ohio County Sheriff's Office
- Orange County Sheriff's Office
- Owen County Sheriff's Office
- Parke County Sheriff's Office
- Perry County Sheriff's Office
- Pike County Sheriff's Office
- Porter County Sheriff's Office
- Posey County Sheriff's Office
- Pulaski County Sheriff's Office
- Putnam County Sheriff's Office
- Randolph County Sheriff's Office
- Ripley County Sheriff's Office
- Rush County Sheriff's Office
- Saint Joseph County Police Department
- Scott County Sheriff's Office
- Shelby County Sheriff's Office
- Spencer County Sheriff's Office
- Starke County Sheriff's Office
- Steuben County Sheriff's Office
- Sullivan County Sheriff's Office
- Switzerland County Sheriff's Office
- Tippecanoe County Sheriff's Office
- Tipton County Sheriff's Office
- Union County Sheriff's Office
- Vanderburgh County Sheriff's Office
- Vermillion County Sheriff's Office
- Vigo County Sheriff's Office
- Wabash County Sheriff's Office
- Warren County Sheriff's Office
- Warrick County Sheriff's Office
- Washington County Sheriff's Office
- Wayne County Sheriff's Office
- Wells County Sheriff's Office
- White County Sheriff's Office
- Whitley County Sheriff's Office

== Tier I Municipal Police and Tier II Town Marshal Agencies ==
- Advance Police Department
- Akron Police Department
- Albany Police Department
- Albion Police Department
- Alexandria Police Department
- Amo Police Department
- Anderson Police Department
- Andrews Police Department
- Angola Police Department
- Arcadia Police Department
- Argos Police Department
- Ashley Police Department
- Attica Police Department
- Auburn Police Department
- Aurora Police Department
- Austin Police Department
- Avilla Police Department
- Avon Police Department
- Bainbridge Police Department
- Bargersville Police Department
- Batesville Police Department
- Battle Ground Police Department
- Bedford Police Department
- Beech Grove Police Department
- Berne Police Department
- Beverly Shores Police Department
- Bicknell Police Department
- Birdseye Police Department
- Bloomfield Police Department
- Bloomington Police Department
- Bluffton Police Department
- Boonville Police Department
- Borden Police Department
- Boswell Police Department
- Bourbon Police Department
- Brazil Police Department
- Bremen Police Department
- Bristol Police Department
- Brook Police Department
- Brooklyn Police Department
- Brookston Police Department
- Brookville Police Department
- Brownsburg Police Department
- Brownstown Police Department
- Bunker Hill Police Department
- Burlington Police Department
- Burnettsville Police Department
- Burns Harbor Police Department
- Butler Police Department
- Cadiz Police Department
- Cambridge City Police Department
- Camden Police Department
- Campbellsburg Police Department
- Cannelton Police Department
- Carbon Police Department
- Carlisle Police Department
- Carmel Police Department
- Carthage Police Department
- Cayuga Police Department
- Cedar Lake Police Department
- Centerville Police Department
- Chalmers Police Department
- Chandler Police Department
- Charlestown Police Department
- Chesterfield Police Department
- Chesterton Police Department
- Chrisney Police Department
- Churubusco Police Department
- Cicero Police Department
- Clarks Hill Police Department
- Clarksville Police Department
- Clay City Police Department
- Claypool Police Department
- Clayton Police Department
- Clear Lake Police Department
- Clermont Police Department
- Clifford Police Department
- Clinton Police Department
- Cloverdale Police Department
- Coatesville Police Department
- Colfax Police Department
- Columbia City Police Department
- Columbus Police Department
- Connersville Police Department
- Converse Police Department
- Corydon Police Department
- Covington Police Department
- Crawfordsville Police Department
- Cromwell Police Department
- Crothersville Police Department
- Crown Point Police Department
- Culver Police Department
- Cumberland Police Department
- Cynthiana Police Department
- Dale Police Department
- Daleville Police Department
- Dana Police Department
- Danville Police Department
- Darlington Police Department
- Dayton Police Department
- Decatur Police Department
- Delphi Police Department
- DeMotte Police Department
- Dillsboro Police Department
- Dugger Police Department
- Dunkirk Police Department
- Dyer Police Department
- East Chicago Police Department
- Eaton Police Department
- Edgewood Police Department
- Edinburgh Police Department
- Elberfeld Police Department
- Elizabethtown Police Department
- Elkhart Police Department
- Ellettsville Police Department
- Elwood Police Department
- English Police Department
- Evansville Police Department
- Fairmount Police Department
- Fairview Park Police Department
- Farmersburg Police Department
- Farmland Police Department
- Ferdinand Police Department
- Fillmore Police Department
- Fishers Police Department
- Flora Police Department
- Fort Branch Police Department
- Fort Wayne Police Department
- Fortville Police Department
- Fountain City Police Department
- Fowler Police Department
- Fowlerton Police Department
- Francesville Police Department
- Francisco Police Department
- Frankfort Police Department
- Franklin Police Department
- Frankton Police Department
- Fremont Police Department
- French Lick Police Department
- Fulton Police Department
- Galveston Police Department
- Garrett Police Department
- Gary Police Department
- Gas City Police Department
- Gaston Police Department
- Geneva Police Department
- Gentryville Police Department
- Georgetown Police Department
- Glenwood Police Department
- Goodland Police Department
- Goshen Police Department
- Gosport Police Department
- Greencastle Police Department
- Greendale Police Department
- Greenfield Police Department
- Greens Fork Police Department
- Greensboro Police Department
- Greensburg Police Department
- Greentown Police Department
- Greenville Police Department
- Greenwood Police Department
- Griffith Police Department
- Hagerstown Police Department
- Hamlet Police Department
- Hammond Police Department
- Hanover Police Department
- Hartford City Police Department
- Hartsville Police Department
- Haubstadt Police Department
- Hebron Police Department
- Highland Police Department
- Hillsboro Police Department
- Hobart Police Department
- Holland Police Department
- Holton Police Department
- Homecroft Police Department
- Hope Police Department
- Hudson Police Department
- Huntingburg Police Department
- Huntington Police Department
- Hymera Police Department
- Indianapolis Metropolitan Police Department
- Ingalls Police Department
- Jamestown Police Department
- Jasonville Police Department
- Jasper Police Department
- Jeffersonville Police Department
- Jonesboro Police Department
- Kempton Police Department
- Kendallville Police Department
- Kennard Police Department
- Kentland Police Department
- Kewanna Police Department
- Kingman Police Department
- Kingsbury Police Department
- Kingsford Heights Police Department
- Kirklin Police Department
- Knightstown Police Department
- Knightsville Police Department
- Knox Police Department
- Kokomo Police Department
- Kouts Police Department
- La Fontaine Police Department
- La Porte Police Department
- Ladoga Police Department
- Lafayette Police Department
- LaGrange Police Department
- Lake Station Police Department
- Lakeville Police Department
- Lanesville Police Department
- Lapel Police Department
- Laurel Police Department
- Lawrence Police Department
- Lawrenceburg Police Department
- Leavenworth Police Department
- Lebanon Police Department
- Liberty Police Department
- Ligonier Police Department
- Linden Police Department
- Linton Police Department
- Lizton Police Department
- Logansport Police Department
- Long Beach Police Department
- Loogootee Police Department
- Losantville Police Department
- Lowell Police Department
- Lynn Police Department
- Lynnville Police Department
- Lyons Police Department
- Madison Police Department
- Marengo Police Department
- Marion Police Department
- Markle Police Department
- Markelville Police Department
- Marshall Police Department
- Martinsville Police Department
- Matthews Police Department
- McCordsville Police Department
- Medaryville Police Department
- Medora Police Department
- Meridian Hills Police Department
- Merrillville Police Department
- Michigan City Police Department
- Michigantown Police Department
- Middlebury Police Department
- Middletown Police Department
- Milan Police Department
- Milford Police Department
- Millersburg Police Department
- Milltown Police Department
- Milton Police Department
- Mishawaka Police Department
- Mitchell Police Department
- Monon Police Department
- Monroe Police Department
- Monroeville Police Department
- Monrovia Police Department
- Montezuma Police Department
- Monticello Police Department
- Montpelier Police Department
- Mooreland Police Department
- Moores Hill Police Department
- Mooresville Police Department
- Morgantown Police Department
- Morocco Police Department
- Morristown Police Department
- Mount Carmel Police Department
- Mount Summit Police Department
- Mount Vernon Police Department
- Mulberry Police Department
- Muncie Police Department
- Munster Police Department
- Nappanee Police Department
- Nashville Police Department
- New Albany Police Department
- New Carlisle Police Department
- New Castle Police Department
- New Chicago Police Department
- New Harmony Police Department
- New Haven Police Department
- New Market Police Department
- New Palestine Police Department
- New Pekin Police Department
- New Point Police Department
- New Ross Police Department
- New Whiteland Police Department
- Newburgh Police Department
- Noblesville Police Department
- North Judson Police Department
- North Liberty Police Department
- North Manchester Police Department
- North Salem Police Department
- North Vernon Police Department
- North Webster Police Department
- Oakland City Police Department
- Oaktown Police Department
- Odon Police Department
- Ogden Dunes Police Department
- Oldenburg Police Department
- Oolitic Police Department
- Orestes Police Department
- Orland Police Department
- Orleans Police Department
- Osceola Police Department
- Osgood Police Department
- Ossian Police Department
- Otterbein Police Department
- Oxford Police Department
- Owensville Police Department
- Palmyra Police Department
- Paoli Police Department
- Paragon Police Department
- Parker City Police Department
- Patoka Police Department
- Pendleton Police Department
- Pennville Police Department
- Perrysville Police Department
- Peru Police Department
- Petersburg Police Department
- Pierceton Police Department
- Pittsboro Police Department
- Plainfield Police Department
- Plymouth Police Department
- Portage Police Department
- Porter Police Department
- Portland Police Department
- Poseyville Police Department
- Princeton Police Department
- Prince's Lakes Police Department
- Redkey Police Department
- Remington Police Department
- Rensselaer Police Department
- Reynolds Police Department
- Richmond Police Department
- Ridgeville Police Department
- Rising Sun Police Department
- Roachdale Police Department
- Roann Police Department
- Roanoke Police Department
- Rochester Police Department
- Rockport Police Department
- Rockville Police Department
- Rocky Ripple Police Department
- Rome City Police Department
- Rosedale Police Department
- Roseland Police Department
- Rossville Police Department
- Royal Center Police Department
- Rushville Police Department
- Russellville Police Department
- Russiaville Police Department
- Salem Police Department
- Santa Claus Police Department
- Saratoga Police Department
- Schererville Police Department
- Schneider Police Department
- Scottsburg Police Department
- Seelyville Police Department
- Sellersburg Police Department
- Selma Police Department
- Seymour Police Department
- Sharpsville Police Department
- Shelburn Police Department
- Shelbyville Police Department
- Sheridan Police Department
- Shipshewana Police Department
- Shirley Police Department
- Shoals Police Department
- Silver Lake Police Department
- South Bend Police Department
- South Whitley Police Department
- Southport Police Department
- Speedway Police Department
- Spencer Police Department
- Spurgeon Police Department
- Staunton Police Department
- St John Police Department
- St Leon Police Department
- St Paul Police Department
- Stilesville Police Department
- Stinesville Police Department
- Sullivan Police Department
- Sulphur Springs Police Department
- Summitville Police Department
- Sunman Police Department
- Swayzee Police Department
- Sweetser Police Department
- Syracuse Police Department
- Tell City Police Department
- Tennyson Police Department
- Terre Haute Police Department
- Thorntown Police Department
- Tipton Police Department
- Topeka Police Department
- Trafalgar Police Department
- Trail Creek Police Department
- Troy Police Department
- Union City Police Department
- Upland Police Department
- Utica Police Department
- Valparaiso Police Department
- Van Buren Police Department
- Veedersburg Police Department
- Vernon Police Department
- Versailles Police Department
- Vevay Police Department
- Vincennes Police Department
- Wabash Police Department
- Wakarusa Police Department
- Walkerton Police Department
- Walton Police Department
- Warren Park Police Department
- Warren Police Department
- Warsaw Police Department
- Washington Police Department
- Waterloo Police Department
- Waveland Police Department
- Waynetown Police Department
- West Baden Springs Police Department
- West Harrison Police Department
- West Lafayette Police Department
- West Lebanon Police Department
- West Terre Haute Police Department
- Westfield Police Department
- Westport Police Department
- Westville Police Department
- Wheatfield Police Department
- Whiteland Police Department
- Whitestown Police Department
- Whiting Police Department
- Wilkinson Police Department
- Williams Creek Police Department
- Williamsport Police Department
- Winamac Police Department
- Winchester Police Department
- Windfall Police Department
- Winfield Police Department
- Winona Lake Police Department
- Winslow Police Department
- Wolcott Police Department
- Wolcottville Police Department
- Woodburn Police Department
- Worthington Police Department
- Yorktown Police Department
- Zanesville Police Department
- Zionsville Police Department

== Tier I College and University Police Agencies ==
- Anderson University Police Department
- Ball State University Police Department
- Butler University Police Department
- DePauw University Department of Public Safety
- Huntington University Police Department
- Indiana Purdue Fort Wayne (IPFW) Police Department
- Indiana State University Police Department
- Indiana University Public Safety

- Indiana University Police Department (Bloomington)
- Indiana University East Police Department (Richmond)
- Indiana University Kokomo Police Department
- Indiana University Northwest Police Department (Gary)
- Indiana University South Bend Police Department
- Indiana University Southeast Police Department (New Albany)
- Indiana University–Purdue University Indianapolis Police Department

- Indiana Wesleyan University Police Department
- Marian University Police Department
- Notre Dame University Police Department
- Oakland City University Police Department
- Purdue University Police Department

- Purdue University Northwest Police Department

- Taylor University Police Department
- University of Indianapolis Police Department
- Valparaiso University Police Department
- Vincennes University Police Department

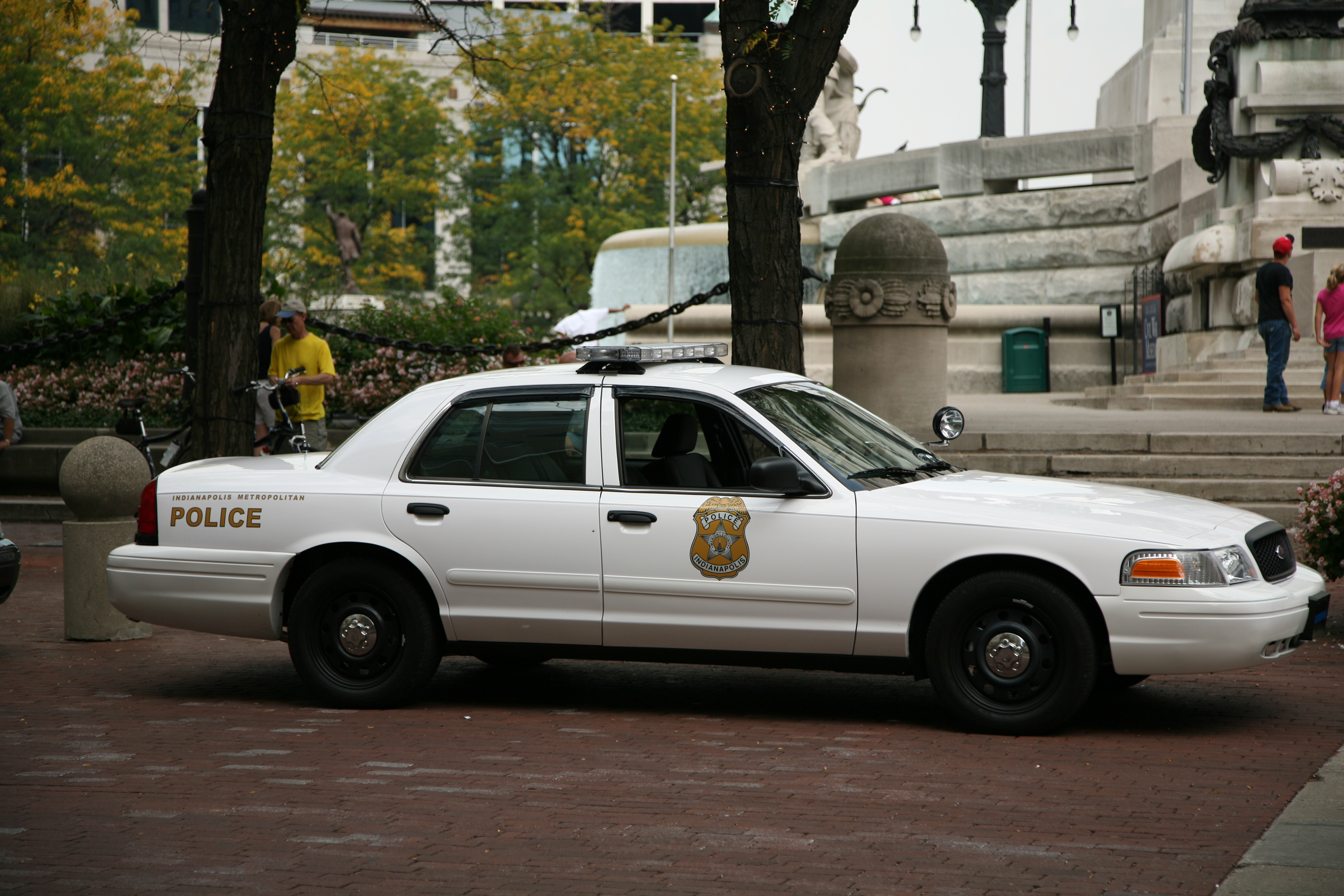
An Indianapolis Metropolitan police cruiser.

== Tier I School Corporation Police Agencies Set Forth Under I.C. 20-26-16 ==
- Brownsburg Community School Corporation Police Department
- Center Grove Community School Corporation Police Department
- Concord Community Schools Police Department
- Evansville Vanderburgh School Corporation Police Department
- Franklin Township Community School Corporation Police Department
- Indiana School for the Deaf Police Department
- Lebanon Schools Police Department
- Metropolitan School District of Pike Township Police Department
- Metropolitan School District of Warren Township Police Department
- Metropolitan School District of Wayne Township Police Department
- Monroe County Community School Corporation Police Department
- Prairie Heights School Corporation Police Department

== Tier I Airport, Transit, & Railroad Police Agencies ==
- Amtrak Police Department
- Canadian National Railroad Police Department
- CSX Police Department
- Fort Wayne International Airport Authority Public Safety Department
- Indiana Harbor Belt Railroad Police Department
- Indianapolis International Airport Police Department
- Louisville and Indiana Railroad Security Department
- Norfolk Southern Railroad Police Department
- Northern Indiana Commuter Transportation District (NICTD) Police Department
- St Joseph County Airport Authority Department of Public Safety
- Terre Haute International Airport - Hulman Field Police Department

== Tier II Hospital Police Agencies ==
- Deaconess Hospital Police Department
- Ascension St. Vincent Hospital Police Department
- Columbus Regional Health Police Department
- Community Hospital Anderson Police Department
- Indiana University Health Department of Public Safety - Police
- Marion General Hospital Police Department
- Memorial Hospital of South Bend Police Department
- Parkview Health Hospital Police Department
- Reid Health Hospital Police Department

== Fire Departments Employing Tier I or Tier III Arson Investigators ==
- Evansville Fire Department
- Fort Wayne Fire Department
- Indianapolis Fire Department
- Plainfield Fire Territory

== Agencies Employing Special Police or Special Deputies Set Forth Under I.C. 36-8-3-7 & 36-8-10-10.6 ==
- Marion County
  - Community Health Network Hospital Security
  - Eagle/Trident Patrol
  - Eskenazi Hospital Security
  - Indianapolis-Marion County Forensic Services
- Indianapolis Public Schools Police Department
  - Metropolitan School District of Perry Township Police Department
  - Metropolitan School District of Washington Township Police Department
  - Metropolitan School District of Wayne Township Police Department
  - Pike Township Fire Department
  - Protection Plus Inc
  - St Francis Hospital Security
  - St Vincent Hospital Security
  - Wayne Township Fire Department

== ILETB Certified Training Academies ==
- Fort Wayne Police Academy in Fort Wayne
- Indiana Law Enforcement Academy (ILEA) in Plainfield
- Indiana State Police Academy at ILEA in Plainfield
- Indiana University Police Academy in Bloomington
- Indianapolis Metropolitan Police Academy in Indianapolis
- Northern Indiana Law Enforcement Academy (NILEA) in Valparaiso
- Southwest Indiana Law Enforcement Academy (SWILEA) in Evansville

== Agencies Set Forth as "Law Enforcement" Under Definition I.C. 35-31.5-2-185 but Minimum Training Standards Not Governed by the ILETB ==
- Center Township Constable's Office - Marion County, Indiana
- Decatur Township Constable's Office - Marion County, Indiana
- Franklin Township Constable's Office - Marion County, Indiana
- Lawrence Township Constable's Office - Marion County, Indiana
- Perry Township Constable's Office - Marion County, Indiana
- Pike Township Constable's Office - Marion County, Indiana
- Warren Township Constable's Office - Marion County, Indiana
- Washington Township Constable's Office - Marion County, Indiana
- Wayne Township Constable's Office - Marion County, Indiana

== County Prosecutor Agencies ==
- Adams County Prosecutor's Office
- Allen County Prosecutor's Office
- Bartholomew County Prosecutor's Office
- Benton County Prosecutor's Office
- Blackford County Prosecutor's Office
- Boone County Prosecutor's Office
- Brown County Prosecutor's Office
- Carroll County Prosecutor's Office
- Cass County Prosecutor's Office
- Clark County Prosecutor's Office
- Clay County Prosecutor's Office
- Clinton County Prosecutor's Office
- Crawford County Prosecutor's Office
- Daviess County Prosecutor's Office
- Dearborn-Ohio County Prosecutor's Office
- Decatur County Prosecutor's Office
- DeKalb County Prosecutor's Office
- Delaware County Prosecutor's Office
- Dubois County Prosecutor's Office
- Elkhart County Prosecutor's Office
- Fayette County Prosecutor's Office
- Floyd County Prosecutor's Office
- Fountain County Prosecutor's Office
- Franklin County Prosecutor's Office
- Fulton County Prosecutor's Office
- Gibson County Prosecutor's Office
- Grant County Prosecutor's Office
- Greene County Prosecutor's Office
- Hamilton County Prosecutor's Office
- Hancock County Prosecutor's Office
- Harrison County Prosecutor's Office
- Hendricks County Prosecutor's Office
- Henry County Prosecutor's Office
- Howard County Prosecutor's Office
- Huntington County Prosecutor's Office
- Jackson County Prosecutor's Office
- Jasper County Prosecutor's Office
- Jay County Prosecutor's Office
- Jefferson County Prosecutor's Office
- Jennings County Prosecutor's Office
- Johnson County Prosecutor's Office
- Knox County Prosecutor's Office
- Kosciusko County Prosecutor's Office
- LaGrange County Prosecutor's Office
- Lake County Prosecutor's Office
- La Porte County Prosecutor's Office
- Lawrence County Prosecutor's Office
- Madison County Prosecutor's Office
- Marion County Prosecutor's Office
- Marshall County Prosecutor's Office
- Martin County Prosecutor's Office
- Miami County Prosecutor's Office
- Monroe County Prosecutor's Office
- Montgomery County Prosecutor's Office
- Morgan County Prosecutor's Office
- Newton County Prosecutor's Office
- Noble County Prosecutor's Office
- Orange County Prosecutor's Office
- Owen County Prosecutor's Office
- Parke County Prosecutor's Office
- Perry County Prosecutor's Office
- Pike County Prosecutor's Office
- Porter County Prosecutor's Office
- Posey County Prosecutor's Office
- Pulaski County Prosecutor's Office
- Putnam County Prosecutor's Office
- Randolph County Prosecutor's Office
- Ripley County Prosecutor's Office
- Rush County Prosecutor's Office
- St Joseph County Prosecutor's Office
- Scott County Prosecutor's Office
- Shelby County Prosecutor's Office
- Spencer County Prosecutor's Office
- Starke County Prosecutor's Office
- Steuben County Prosecutor's Office
- Sullivan County Prosecutor's Office
- Switzerland County Prosecutor's Office
- Tippecanoe County Prosecutor's Office
- Tipton County Prosecutor's Office
- Union County Prosecutor's Office
- Vanderburgh County Prosecutor's Office
- Vermillion County Prosecutor's Office
- Vigo County Prosecutor's Office
- Wabash County Prosecutor's Office
- Warren County Prosecutor's Office
- Warrick County Prosecutor's Office
- Washington County Prosecutor's Office
- Wayne County Prosecutor's Office
- Wells County Prosecutor's Office
- White County Prosecutor's Office
- Whitley County Prosecutor's Office

== Disbanded/Defunct Agencies ==
- Ainsworth Town Marshal's Office
- Alamo Police Department
- Amboy Police Department
- Ambia Police Department
- Atlanta Police Department
- Blountsville Police Department
- Castleton Police Department
- Center Point Police Department
- Columbus Park Police Department
- Crane Police Department
- Crows Nest Police Department
- Denve Police Department
- Diamond Town Marshal's Office
- Dublin Police Department
- Dune Acres Police Department
- Edwardsport Police Department
- Elnora Police Department
- Etna Green Police Department
- Eugene Town Marshal's Office
- Evansville Park Police Department
- Evansville Regional Airport Police Department
- Gary Park Police Department
- Grandview Police Department
- Hanover University Police Department
- Hunertown Police Department
- Indiana Department of Conservation
- Indiana War Memorial Police Department
- Indianapolis Department of Public Safety
- Indianapolis Housing Authority Department of Public Safety
- Indianapolis Police Department
- Iona Police Department
- Jefferson Township Constable's Office
- Jonesville Police Department
- LaPaz Police Department
- Lagro Police Department
- Laurel Police Department
- Leo Police Department
- Lewisville Police Department
- Mecca Police Department
- Mellott Police Department
- Miller Town Marshal's Office
- Modoc Police Department
- Montgomery Police Department
- New Richmond Police Department
- New Ross Police Department
- Pekin Police Department
- Plainville Police Department
- Pottawattamie Park Police Department
- Ravenswood Police Department
- Sandborn Police Department
- South Bend Park Police Department
- Spiceland Police Department
- Spring Lake Police Department
- Town of Pines Police Department
- Union Police Department
- Union Station Police Department
- Wanatah Police Department
- Warrenton Police Department
- Wingate Police Department

== See also ==
- Crime in Indiana
- Law enforcement in the United States
- Contracted law enforcement municipalities in Indiana
