= Indiana State Excise Police =

- Abbreviation: ISEP

Agency overview
- Formed: 1933

Jurisdictional structure
- Operations jurisdiction: Indiana, USA
- General nature: Local civilian police

Operational structure
- Headquarters: Indianapolis, Indiana
- Elected officer responsible: Mike Braun, Governor
- Agency executive: David Miller, Superintendent

Website
- http://www.in.gov/atc/isep/index.htm

The Indiana State Excise Police is an Indiana law enforcement agency, functioning as the law enforcement arm of the Indiana Alcohol and Tobacco Commission. ISEP's primary mission is to enforce the rules and regulations of ATC, as well as other state law. ISEP performs this mission through enforcement, education, and partnerships with the alcohol and tobacco industry and retailers across the state. This includes laws related to marijuana, cocaine, and alcohol serving and licensing.

== About ISEP ==
ISEP was founded in 1937, when Governor Paul V. McNutt signed a bill creating the Alcoholic Beverage Commission; the bill also created the Excise Police. In 1985, Governor Robert D. Orr signed a bill granting Excise Police officers full law enforcement powers. In 1998, former Indianapolis Police Department Captain Penny Davis was named ISEP's first female superintendent; she had previously been IPD's first female detective. In 2001, the ABC was renamed the Indiana Alcohol and Tobacco Commission.

ISEP largely follows the same rank structure as the Indiana State Police. ISEP officers attend a nine-week recruit school located on the grounds of the Indiana Law Enforcement Academy.

Currently the 9mm Glock 17 is the standard issue sidearm.

== See also ==
- List of law enforcement agencies in Indiana
