= 2021 Indianapolis FedEx shooting =

Mass shooting in Indianapolis, Indiana

Indianapolis FedEx shooting
- Location of Indianapolis and Indiana
- Location: 39°40′57″N 86°19′21″W; Indianapolis, Indiana, U.S.
- Date: April 15, 2021; 5 years ago c. 11:00 – c. 11:04 p.m. (EDT; UTC−04:00)
- Target: People at a FedEx facility
- Attack type: Mass shooting; murder–suicide; mass murder
- Weapons: Ruger AR-556 semi-automatic rifle; HM Defense HM15F semi-automatic rifle
- Deaths: 9 (including the perpetrator)
- Injuries: 7 (4 by gunfire)
- Perpetrator: Brandon Scott Hole
- Motive: Perceived demonstration of masculinity; Homicidal ideation; Suicidal ideation; Thrill

On April 15, 2021, a mass shooting occurred at a FedEx Ground facility in Indianapolis, Indiana, United States. Nineteen-year-old Brandon Scott Hole killed eight people and wounded four before committing suicide. Three others were injured by other causes. The Federal Bureau of Investigation (FBI) concluded that the shooting was "an act of suicidal murder" driven by Hole's desire to prove his masculinity and experience killing. It remains the deadliest mass shooting in the history of Indiana.

== Shooting ==
The FedEx facility where the shooting occurred is located in southwestern Indianapolis, near Indianapolis International Airport. Its entrance is equipped with metal detectors and turnstiles, requiring employees to scan their FedEx badges for entry. At the time of the shooting, around 100 people were present within the building, many of whom were either changing shifts or on lunch breaks.

Upon arriving at the facility, Hole first entered the building to speak with security before returning to his vehicle. Moments later, he exited his vehicle with a rifle and opened fire on employees in the parking lot. Hole then proceeded to the facility's entrance and fired at employees through a full-height turnstile before returning to the parking lot. One employee attempted to return fire with a handgun, but missed. Jeremiah Levi Miller, a witness, heard Hole shouting indistinctly. Other witnesses stated that the company's ban on personal cell phones hindered those inside from calling for help. The shooting ended when Hole re-entered the building and committed suicide.

Indianapolis Metropolitan Police Department officers responded to the scene late at night. Hole was already dead upon their arrival. Police dispatch audio indicated that he was found with two rifles.

== Victims ==
There were nine fatalities in the shooting, including the perpetrator. The eight victims, whose ages ranged from 19 to 74, included four individuals found dead outside the facility and four more found inside. Four of the victims were members of the local Sikh community, which, according to the local police chief, comprised approximately 90% of the facility's workforce. Four other individuals sustained gunshot wounds and were hospitalized, one in critical condition. A fifth person sought treatment in another county, and two others were treated at the scene before being released.

The following were killed in the shooting: Matthew Alexander, 32; Samaria Blackwell, 19; Amarjeet Johal, 66; Jasvinder Kaur, 50; Amarjit Sekhon, 48; Jaswinder Singh, 68; Karli Smith, 19; and John Weisert, 74.

== Perpetrator ==
Police identified the gunman as Brandon Scott Hole (August 20, 2001 – April 15, 2021), a former FedEx employee who was fired in October 2020 for absenteeism. Following the shooting, authorities conducted a search of his home and seized evidence, including electronics. An investigation of archived content from Hole's deleted Facebook accounts revealed that he was a "brony", a male fan of the children's television series My Little Pony: Friendship Is Magic. Less than an hour before the shooting, Hole posted to Facebook: "I hope that I can be with Applejack in the afterlife, my life has no meaning without her. If there's no afterlife and she isn't real then my life never mattered anyway."

From the age of three, Hole struggled with mental health issues, including obsessive–compulsive disorder, anxiety, and major depressive disorder. In 2013, Hole was arrested for attacking his mother with knives; he was released on probation after a brief stay in juvenile detention. In March 2020, Hole's mother told police officers that Hole had purchased a shotgun and intended to use it to commit suicide by cop, after which Hole was detained and the shotgun was seized. When Hole asked the police not to turn off the power strip on his computer, an officer entered his bedroom and found what appeared to be white supremacist websites on his computer. Hole was placed on a temporary mental health hold, but was released in less than two hours. The FBI questioned him the following month about the websites, but the investigation was closed due to insufficient evidence of any criminal violation or a racially motivated extremist ideology.

Hole used two AR-15 style rifles in the shooting, both legally purchased from a licensed gun store in July and September 2020. Despite the March 2020 incident, Indiana's red flag law, which could have prevented Hole from making firearm purchases for at least six months after his detainment, was not fully invoked. Marion County prosecutors did not schedule a hearing within the required fourteen days after the shotgun seizure, believing the law's objective was met since Hole's family did not want the shotgun back. Prosecutor Ryan Mears noted that if his office had proceeded with the hearing and lost, they would have been forced to return the shotgun, given Hole had been treated but not prescribed medication.

== Aftermath and reactions ==
On April 16, President Joe Biden ordered all flags to be flown at half-mast. He and Vice President Kamala Harris released statements expressing condolences for the victims' families. Later, during a press conference with Japanese Prime Minister Yoshihide Suga, Biden decried the recent string of mass shootings in the United States as a "national embarrassment" and called on Congress to ban military-style assault weapons and large-capacity ammunition magazines. On April 18, Hole's family apologized to the victims' families for his actions. On April 20, Indiana governor Eric Holcomb announced his intention to restore full funding for mental health services and bolster it over the next two years. Democratic state politicians made calls to review and strengthen the red flag law, but this was put on hold after the 2021 legislative session ended on April 22.

Indian Foreign Minister S. Jaishankar said the incident was deeply shocking and offered all possible assistance, as some of the victims were of Indian origin. Since four of the victims were members of the Sikh community and Hole had browsed white supremacist websites in the past, the Sikh Coalition, a Sikh-American advocacy group, called on authorities to investigate whether bias played a role in the shooting.

On April 17, more than 200 people gathered for a candlelight vigil at Indianapolis's Krannert Park. The event included remarks from Joe Hogsett, mayor of Indianapolis; Vop Osili, president of the Indianapolis City-County Council; Randal Taylor, chief of the Indianapolis Metropolitan Police Department; and André Carson, U.S. representative for Indiana's 7th congressional district. Numerous vigils and memorial services were held in the days and weeks following the shooting. On April 19, FedEx established a GoFundMe campaign through the National Compassion Fund to collect donations supporting survivors and the families of victims. FedEx contributed $1 million to the fund.

Following the shooting, attention was directed at Indiana's red flag law for its requirements to prohibit someone from owning a firearm, which was not carried out when authorities seized a shotgun from Hole; this allowed him to purchase the guns he used in the shooting. The Indiana Fraternal Order of Police criticized Marion County Prosecutor Ryan Mears for sidestepping the process and "[failing] to do his part", while Mears criticized the red flag law for having too many "loopholes". FedEx's no-phone policy, which seemed to prevent people from contacting employees at the facility during the shooting, was also scrutinized.

On April 11, 2022, families of the victims filed a lawsuit alleging inadequate security and negligence prior to and during the shooting against Securitas Security Services, USA, FedEx Corporation, Federal Express Corporation, FedEx Corporate Services, Inc., and FedEx Ground Package System, Inc. The case was dismissed on April 5, 2024.

On April 23, 2022, eight trees memorializing the victims were planted at Arsenal Park in Indianapolis. The planting was sponsored by the Sikh Coalition and hosted by Keep Indianapolis Beautiful and the Eway Foundation.

On April 13, 2023, victims and families of the shooting filed a lawsuit against the U.S. distributor of the high-capacity magazine (60 rounds) used in the assault, American Tactical Inc., two company executives, and the German manufacturer, Schmeisser GmbH.

== See also ==
- List of mass shootings in the United States in 2021
- Eaton Township Weis Markets shooting
- Wisconsin Sikh temple shooting
