= Indianapolis Police Department =

Law enforcement agency (1854–2006)

- Abbreviation: IPD
- Motto: Integrity Pride Dedication

Agency overview
- Formed: September 1, 1854; 172 years ago
- Dissolved: December 31, 2006; 19 years ago
- Superseding agency: Indianapolis Metropolitan Police Department
- Employees: 1,650 (2006)
- Volunteers: 100 (2006)

Jurisdictional structure
- Operations jurisdiction: Indianapolis, Indiana, United States
- Legal jurisdiction: City of Indianapolis, Indiana
- Governing body: Indianapolis City-County Council
- General nature: Local civilian police

Operational structure
- Headquarters: 50 North Alabama Street
- Sworn Officers/Reserve officers: 1,250/60 (2006)
- Non-Sworn Employees: 250 (2006)
- Elected officer responsible: Bart Peterson, Mayor of Indianapolis
- Agency executive: Michael T. Spears, Chief of Police

Facilities
- Districts: 5: 1 - North District; 2 - East District; 3 - South District; 4 - West District; 5 - Downtown District
- Lockups: Marion County Arrestee Processing Center
- Patrol cars: 1,600

Website
- www.indygov.org/ipd
- Information is at the time the agency was dissolved.

The Indianapolis Police Department (IPD) (September 1, 1854 – December 31, 2006) was the principal law enforcement agency of City of Indianapolis, Indiana, under the jurisdiction of the Mayor of Indianapolis and Director of Public Safety. Prior to the consolidation with the Law Enforcement Division of the Marion County Sheriff's Office to form the Indianapolis Metropolitan Police Department, 1,230 sworn police officers and 250 non-sworn personnel were employed by the department.

== Organization ==
At the time the agency was dissolved, the Indianapolis Police Department had 1,196 sworn police officers and 30 reserve police officers. At that time the agency was headed by Michael T. Spears, chief of police; Robert Turner, director of public safety; and Bart Peterson, mayor of Indianapolis.

=== Patrol districts ===
- North District - Adam Sector - 4209 N College Ave.
- East District - Baker Sector - 3120 E 30th St.
- South District - Charles Sector - 1150 Shelby St.
- West District - David Sector - 551 N. King Ave.
- Downtown District - Edward Sector - 25 W 9th St.

== Rank structure ==
There were five police districts, each led by a deputy chief. Deputy chiefs reported to assistant chiefs, assistant chiefs reported to the chief of police, and the chief of police was subject to the authority of the mayor.

=== Police ranks ===
Title	Insignia
Chief of Police	
Assistant Chief	
Deputy Chief	
Major	
Captain	
Lieutenant	
Sergeant	
Patrolman	
Probationary Officer	
Recruit Officer	

== Uniform ==
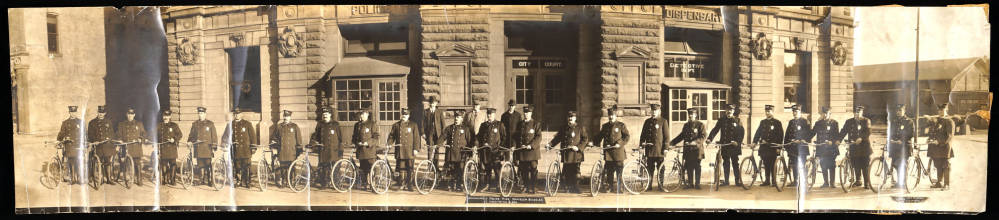
A panoramic photograph of the Indianapolis Police mounted on bicycles, outside the building housing the police headquarters, city court, and city dispensary at 35 South Alabama Street. circa 1897-1910

The first officers for the department were identified only by a silver star. The police were put into uniforms in July 1862, consisting of a dark blue coat, light blue trousers with a cord along the seam, and a blue cap.

Over the years the department's uniform underwent several changes. Prior to the merger in 2007, officers were required to maintain both summer and winter uniforms as well as authorized leather goods. Patrol officer badges were silver, while those for sergeants and above were gold. The uniform for all ranks was navy blue. When in dress uniform officers wore a peaked cap adorned with a cap badge.

== Fallen officers ==
Throughout the history of the Indianapolis Police Department, 60 officers have died in the line of duty.

== See also ==
- List of law enforcement agencies in Indiana
