= Indiana Alcohol and Tobacco Commission =

State agency in Indiana, United States

The Indiana Alcohol and Tobacco Commission is an Indiana state government agency.

== History ==
The Indiana Alcoholic Beverage Commission was created by an Act of the Indiana General Assembly in 1933, following the repeal of Prohibition. On July 1, 2001, the name was changed to the Alcohol and Tobacco Commission.

The Commission aims to protect the economic welfare, health, peace and morals of Indiana citizens, to regulate and limit the manufacture, sale, possession, and use of alcohol and alcoholic beverages, and to provide for the raising of revenue.

== Operations ==
The Commission is composed of four members appointed by the Governor of Indiana. There are also local alcoholic beverages boards in each of the state's 92 counties that consider and review all applications for alcoholic beverage permits in their particular area. The State Excise Police enforcement of the laws of the state of Indiana related to alcoholic beverages and rules of the Commission are enforced by the Indiana State Excise Police.

The Commission licenses and regulates permits for the manufacture, operation or sale of alcoholic beverages at all restaurants, breweries, wineries, grocery stores, hotels, drug stores, package stores, stadiums, civic centers, social and fraternal clubs, horse tracks, and river boats throughout the state. In addition, the Commission also licenses and regulates the permits of every bartender, waiter, waitress, salesperson, and clerk associated with the sale or service of alcoholic beverages.
