= Crossroads of America =

Nickname of Indiana, United States

Crossroads of America is the official motto of the U.S. state of Indiana. Various cities in the Midwestern United States also use the phrase or a variant thereof to describe their location.

== Adoption ==
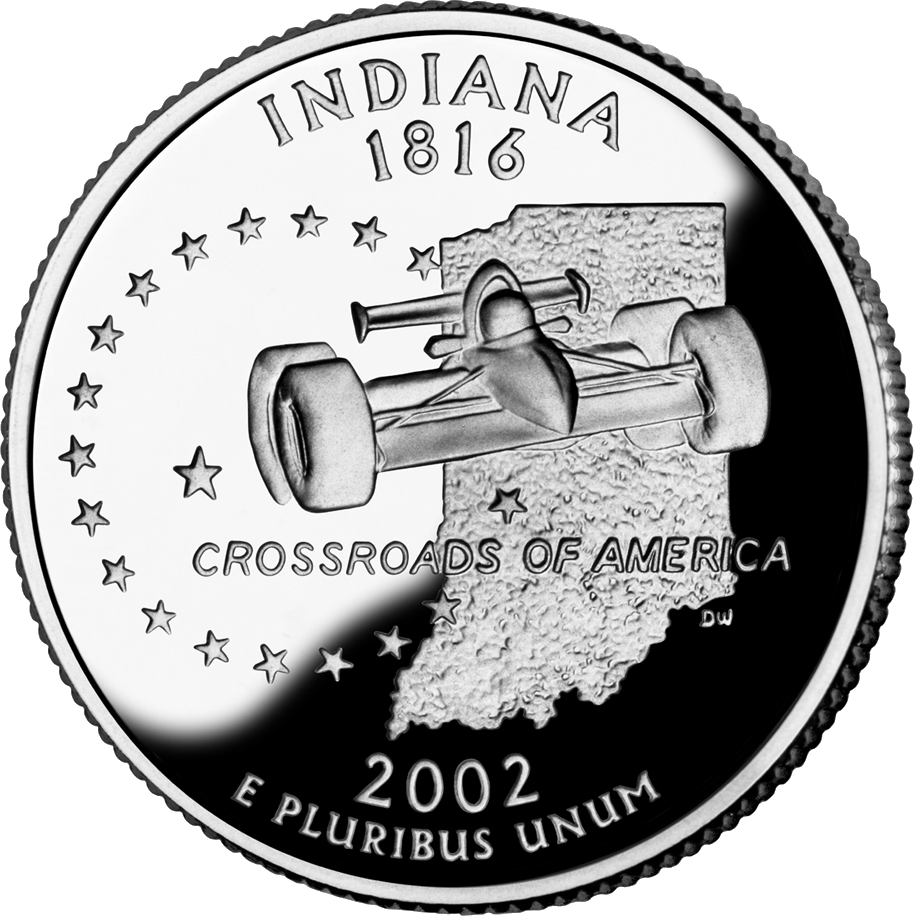
The motto was included on the state quarter of Indiana

The Indiana General Assembly passed a resolution in 1937 establishing the phrase as the state's official motto.

== Use ==
In the early days of cross-country travel by horse and wagon, Terre Haute, Indiana benefited from its location on the old National Road between Indianapolis and Vandalia, Illinois. The National Road was later named U.S. Highway 40 when it became a U.S. Highway in 1926.

At the same time, US 41 was commissioned between Chicago, and Miami. This north–south highway through downtown Terre Haute followed Seventh Street at the time, and met US 40, which followed Wabash Avenue, the main east–west street in town. The Seventh and Wabash intersection thus became known as the "Crossroads of America", an appellation now memorialized with a historical marker at that corner.

Indianapolis, the state capital of Indiana, adopted "Crossroads of America" as its official slogan in 1988. The moniker refers to the city's central location at the junction of four major Interstate Highways: 65, 69, 70, and 74.

Vandalia, Ohio, has also been called the Crossroads of America because US 40 and the eastern division of the Dixie Highway crossed in the middle of the town.

Schererville, Indiana, uses the motto "Crossroads of the Nation" to describe the intersection of U.S. Route 30 and U.S. Route 41 in the center of town. Much of US 30 was originally the Lincoln Highway, one of the first cross country highways in America. US 41 was once one of the most traveled roads from the Midwestern United States to the Southern United States.

Wentzville, Missouri, uses the motto "Crossroads of the Nation" as well to describe the intersection of I-70 and U.S. 40.

Swainsboro, Georgia uses the motto "Crossroads of the Great South."

== See also ==
- List of Indiana state symbols
- List of U.S. state and territory mottos
- Nicknames of Indianapolis
