= Old Indianapolis City Hall =

Historic building in Indianapolis, Indiana, US

- U.S. National Register of Historic Places
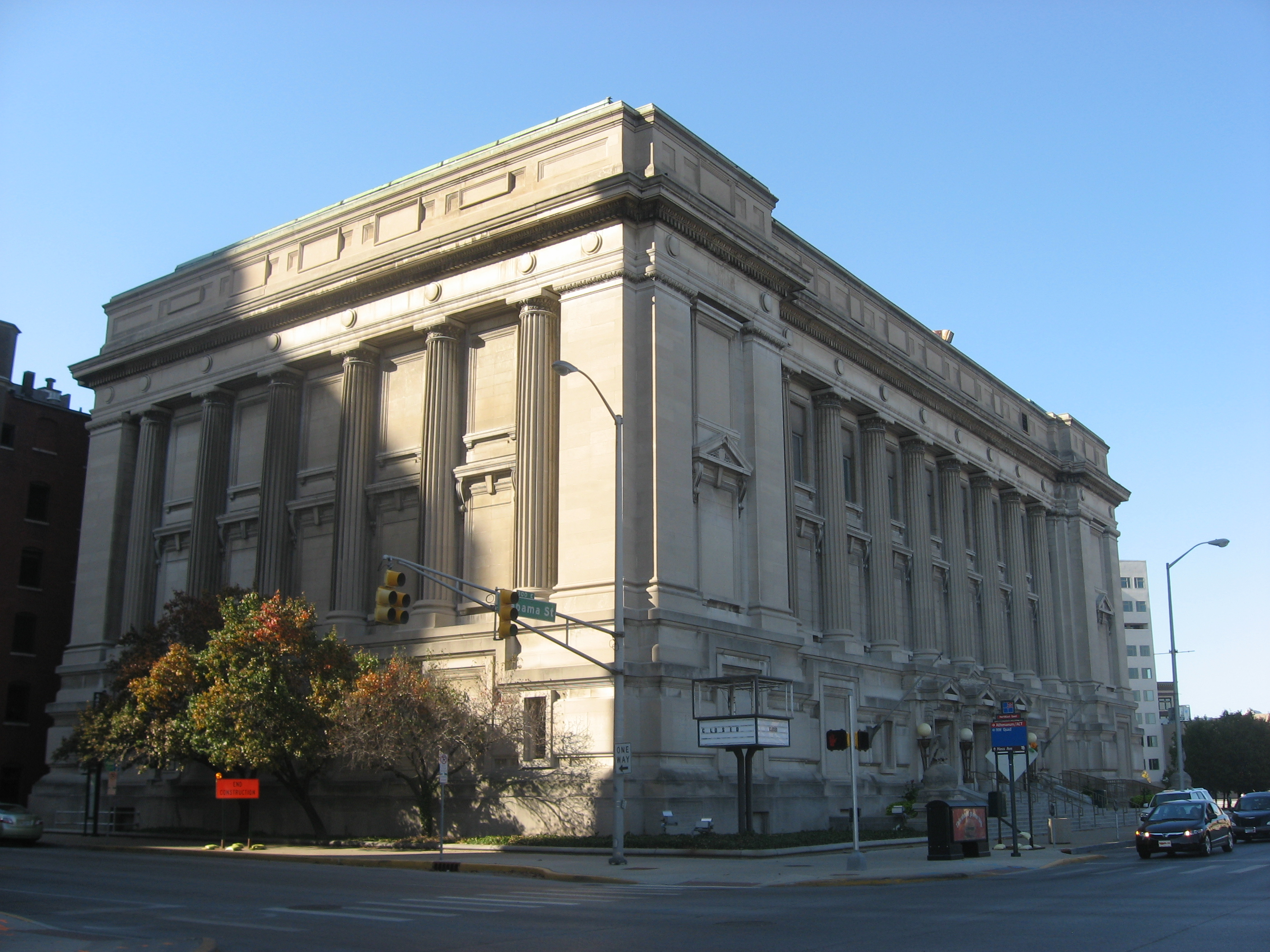
- Old Indianapolis City Hall, 2010

- Location within Indiana Location within the United States
- Location: 202 N. Alabama St., Indianapolis, Indiana
- Coordinates: 39°46′12″N 86°9′9″W
- Area: less than one acre
- Built: 1909-1910
- Architects: Rubush & Hunter; Behrens, William F.
- Architectural style: Classical Revival, Renaissance
- NRHP reference No.: 74000029
- Added to NRHP: October 29, 1974

Old Indianapolis City Hall, formerly known as the Indiana State Museum, is a historic city hall located at Indianapolis, Indiana, United States. It was built in 1909–1910, and is a four-story, Classical Revival style brick building sheathed in Indiana limestone. It measures 188 by 133 feet (57 by 41 m).

It was listed on the National Register of Historic Places in 1974.

== History ==
City Hall was opened in 1910 and was used for that purpose until 1962, when city offices moved to the City-County Building (CCB).

The building housed the Indiana State Museum from 1966 to 2001. Later, when the Indianapolis Public Library Central Library was being rebuilt, the building was used as the temporary Central Library.

== Proposed reuse ==
In anticipation of the criminal and civil courts moving out of the CCB by 2022 into a new Jail/Courts complex, Mayor Joe Hogsett proposed in 2018 that the CCB be sold to private developers and the city and county government offices be moved back into an updated city hall. This proposal was not implemented.

On August 29, 2023, Hogsett announced that the old City Hall and the adjoining parking lot to its north would be sold to the development firm TWG. However, this plan fell through when TWG failed to sign an agreement on April 2, 2026. A 32-story tower with 190 residential units, 150 hotel rooms, 8,000 square feet (740 m^{2}) of retail and hospitality space, and about 300 parking spaces would have been built on the parking lot. A 21c Museum Hotel, the ninth in North America, would have occupied floors 6 through 13 of the tower and would use parts of the city hall for its public art gallery. The total cost of the project was estimated to be $140 million.

== See also ==
- Indianapolis Historic Preservation Commission
- National Register of Historic Places listings in Center Township, Marion County, Indiana
