= City-County Building (Indianapolis) =

High-rise government building in Indianapolis, Indiana, US

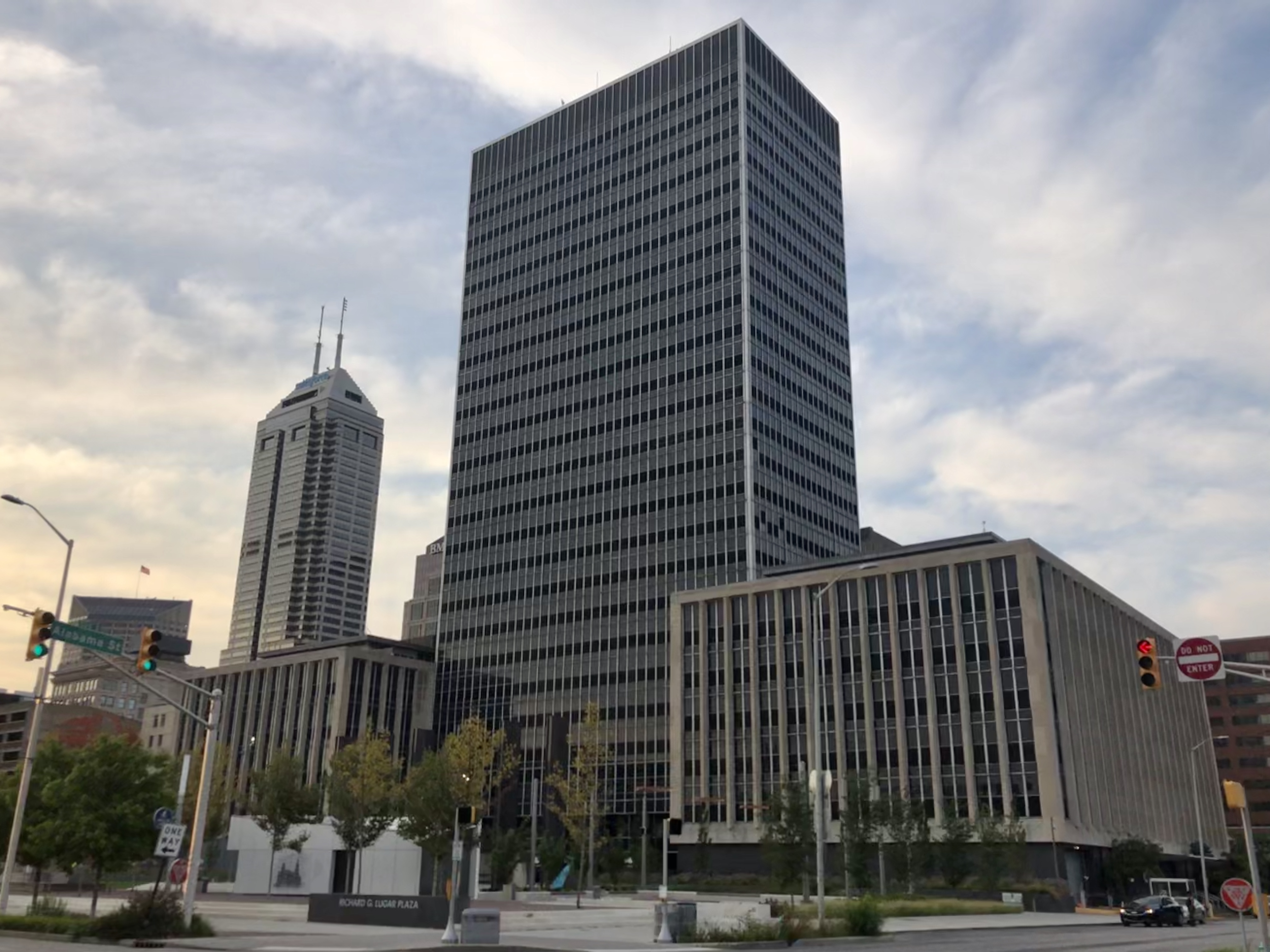
- City-County Building looking northwest from Washington and Alabama streets

General information
- Status: Completed
- Type: Government offices
- Location: 200 E. Washington St. Indianapolis, Indiana, U.S. 46204
- Coordinates: 39°46′04.5″N 86°09′12.75″W
- Construction started: 1959; 67 years ago
- Completed: 1962; 64 years ago
- Cost: $22 million
- Owner: Indianapolis–Marion County Building Authority

Height
- Roof: 372 ft (113 m)

Technical details
- Floor count: 28
- Floor area: 734,447 sq ft (68,232.4 m^{2})

Design and construction
- Architects: Wright, Porteous & Lowe/Bonar; Lennox, Matthews, Simmons & Ford, Inc.
- Structural engineer: J. M. Rotz Engineering Co.

The City-County Building is a 28-story municipal office building in downtown Indianapolis, Indiana, United States. Completed in 1962, the high-rise houses several public agencies of the consolidated city-county government of Indianapolis and Marion County. Executive and legislative functions are carried out from the building; the county courts exited for a new courthouse in 2022.

== History ==
The building opened in 1962 after two years of construction, at a cost of $22 million. The City-County Building is notable as the first building to surpass the height of the Soldiers' and Sailors' Monument. It remained the tallest building in the city until 1970. The building's total floor area covers 734,447 sq ft (68,232.4 m^{2}).

Prior to its construction, Marion County offices were located in the Marion County Courthouse, which stood on what is now Richard G. Lugar Plaza on the south side of the City-County Building; the courthouse was demolished upon completion of the latter. Indianapolis city offices were located in the Indianapolis City Hall.

== Usage ==
Several public agencies maintain administrative offices in the City-County Building, including the city's departments of business and neighborhood services, metropolitan development, parks, public works, and the Indianapolis Metropolitan Police Department. Until 2022, the building's east and west wings housed the Marion County Courts.

The building's second-floor contains the Beurt R. SerVaas Public Assembly Room, which serves as the Indianapolis City-County Council chambers and a venue for public meetings of various boards and commissions. The office of the mayor of Indianapolis is on the twenty-fifth floor of the building. A service elevator leads to a public observation deck on the twenty-eighth floor of the building.

== Proposal to sell to private sector ==
In 2017, the city began the process to build a new criminal justice complex in the Twin Aire neighborhood that opened in 2022. As a result, there will be a large amount of empty space in the City-County Building. In 2018, the administration of Mayor Joe Hogsett began a process to determine how much office space the city-county government will require in the future, and where it should be located. One possibility is to sell the CCB to private developers and move some of the government offices to the Old Indianapolis City Hall. "Our offices struggle to reorganize around modern technology," Hogsett said. "Many of our offices are sized with the assumption records will be kept in rows and rows of filing cabinets. Why not? That's how they kept the records in 1960. That's how the (City-County Building) was built."

== See also ==
- Government of Indianapolis
- List of tallest buildings in Indianapolis
- List of tallest buildings in Indiana
- Deep energy retrofit

Preceded by Marion County Courthouse	Tallest Building in Indianapolis; 1962–1970; 113 m	Succeeded by One Indiana Square
