= Indianapolis Metropolitan Police Department =

Principal law enforcement agency of Indianapolis, Indiana, US

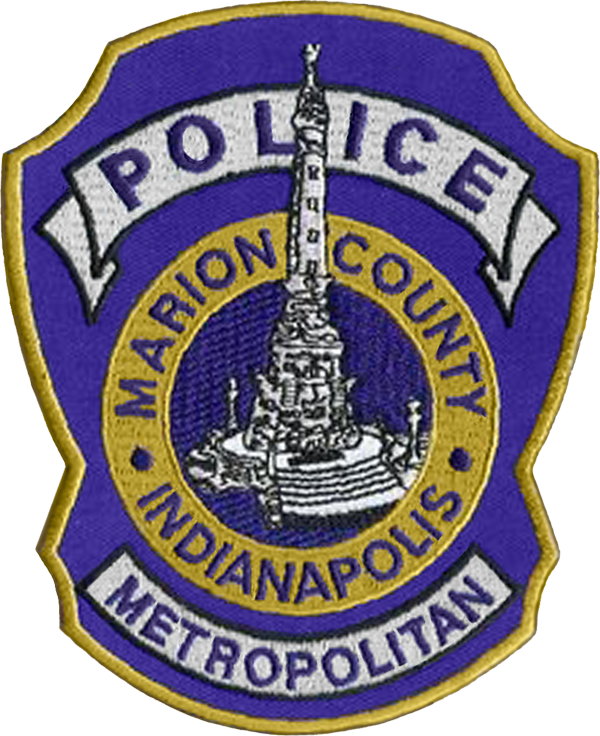
- Patch of Indianapolis Metropolitan Police Department

- Seal of Indianapolis Metropolitan Police Department

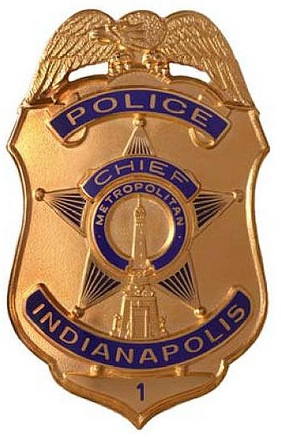
- Badge of Indianapolis Metropolitan Police Department
- Abbreviation: IMPD

Agency overview
- Formed: January 1, 2007; 19 years ago
- Preceding agencies: Indianapolis Police Department; Marion County Sheriff’s Office
- Annual budget: $222 million

Jurisdictional structure
- Operations jurisdiction: Indianapolis, Indiana, U.S.
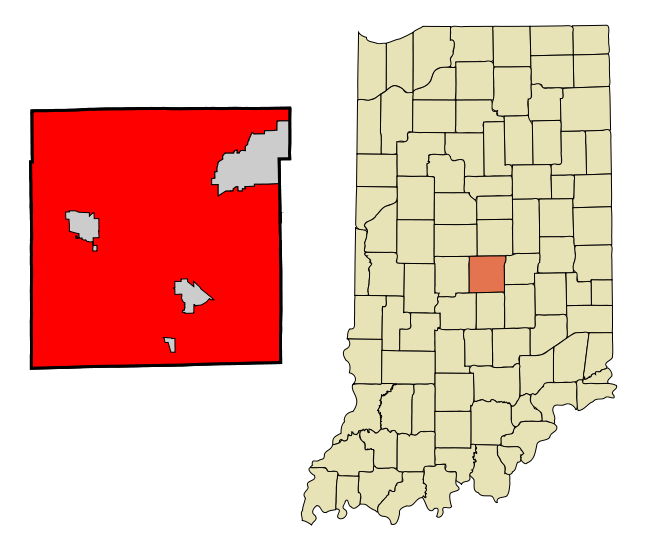
- Map of Indianapolis Metropolitan Police Department's jurisdiction.
- Area: 368.1 sq mi (953.5 km^{2})
- Population: 852,866 (2013)
- Legal jurisdiction: State of Indiana
- Governing body: Indianapolis City-County Council
- Constituting instrument: General Ordinance 110
- General nature: Local civilian police

Operational structure
- Headquarters: City-County Building; 200 E. Washington St., Indianapolis, Indiana, U.S.
- Sworn Officers: ▼1,460 of 1,700 (2024)
- Civilian Employees: 250
- Elected officer responsible: Joe Hogsett, Mayor of Indianapolis
- Agency executive: Tanya Terry, Chief of Police
- Divisions: 3: Operations Division; Investigations Division; Administration/Professional Standards Division

Facilities
- Districts: 6: Downtown District; Northwest District; North District; East District; Southwest District; Southeast District
- Cars: 1,550
- Motorcycles: 70

Website
- www.indy.gov/agency/indianapolis-metropolitan-police-department

The Indianapolis Metropolitan Police Department (IMPD) is the law enforcement agency for the city of Indianapolis, Indiana, United States. Its operational jurisdiction covers all of the consolidated city of Indianapolis and Marion County except for the four excluded cities of Beech Grove, Lawrence, Southport, and Speedway (see Unigov). It was created on January 1, 2007, by consolidating the Indianapolis Police Department and the road division of the Marion County Sheriff's Office. Indianapolis Park Rangers were merged into IMPD in 2009.

== Organization ==
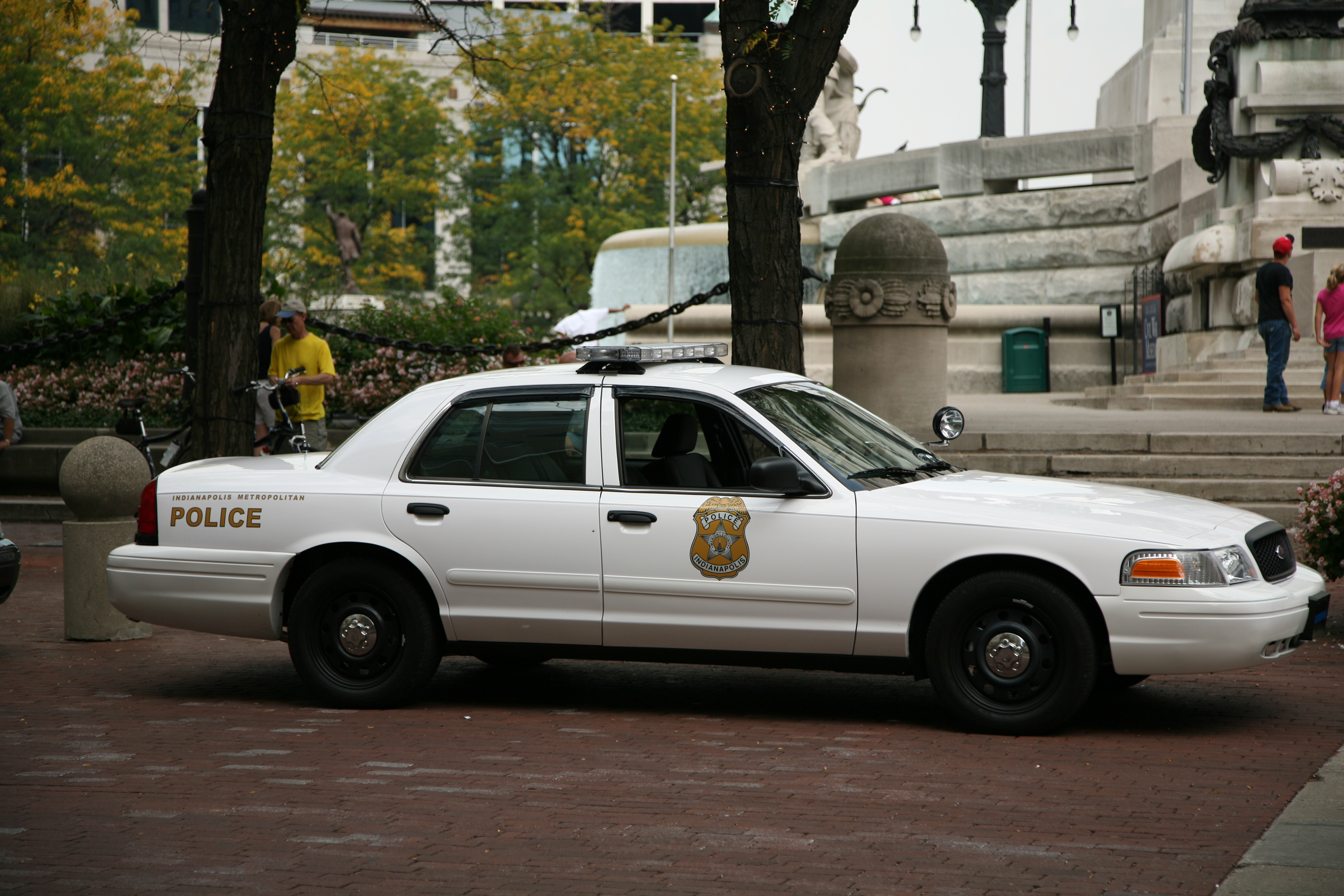
IMPD Crown Victoria Police Interceptor

At the time of its formation, the IMPD was headed by the elected sheriff of Marion County, Frank J. Anderson. However, on February 29, 2008, the department came under the control of the mayor of Indianapolis, Greg Ballard, after Ballard and Anderson reached a resolution for the transfer of power and the City-County Council passed Proposal 6 effecting the change. The mayor appoints the Chief of Police to administer the daily operations of the department. IMPD has six service districts, which are Downtown District, East District, North District, Northwest District, Southeast District and Southwest District.

=== Rank structure ===
The rank structure of the department is as follows:

| Title | Insignia | Badge color | Uniform |
|---|---|---|---|
| Chief of Police | | Gold | Navy blue shirt |
| Assistant Chief | | Gold | Navy blue shirt |
| Deputy Chief | | Gold | Navy blue shirt |
| Commander | | Gold | Navy blue shirt |
| Major | | Gold | Navy blue shirt |
| Captain | | Gold | Navy blue shirt |
| Lieutenant | | Gold | Navy blue shirt |
| Sergeant | | Gold | Navy blue shirt |
| Detective | | Silver | Navy blue shirt |
| Patrolman | | Silver | Navy blue shirt |

=== Weapons ===
- Glock 22 .40 S&W was standard issue and was to be phased out in 2016, but following issues with the Glock 17M, the Glock 22 was put back into service until the issue could be addressed with Glock and the department.
- Glock 17M 9mm is the new issue weapon for 2016 and 2017. Currently all sworn officers have been issued the 17M and the Glock 22 has been completely phased out.
- Remington 870 Pump Action is the standard issue shotgun for the department. The department also uses a less lethal shotgun for certain situations where deadly force isn't needed but a Taser or pepper spray is ineffective.
- AR-15 is the patrol rifle utilized by the officers of the department during intense situations and other situations where a pistol or a shotgun is to little effect. The IMPD uses the Colt CAR-15A3 RO997 (M4A1) as does the agency's SWAT unit.

== Fallen officers ==
Since its creation, four Indianapolis Metropolitan police officers have been killed in the line of duty. For list of officers fallen under the Indianapolis Police Department, see Indianapolis Police Department.

| Name | Date of incident | End of watch | Circumstances |
|---|---|---|---|
| David Spencer Moore | January 23, 2011 | January 26, 2011 | Shot during a traffic stop involving a stolen vehicle on North Temple Avenue. |
| Rod Lee Bradway | September 20, 2013 | September 20, 2013 | Fatally shot while forcing entry to an apartment to rescue a woman and child during a domestic disturbance. |
| Perry Wayne Renn | July 5, 2014 | July 5, 2014 | Killed in an exchange of gunfire with a suspect armed with a rifle near East 34th Street. |
| Breann Rochelle Leath | April 9, 2020 | April 9, 2020 | Shot through a closed door while responding to a domestic violence call at an apartment complex. |

== See also ==
- List of law enforcement agencies in Indiana
