= 2015 Indianapolis mayoral election =

- November 3, 2015
- Turnout: 22.68% ▼7.3pp
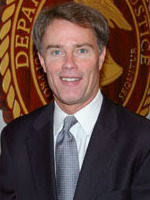

Nominee	Joe Hogsett	Chuck Brewer
Party	Democratic	Republican
Popular vote	92,521	56,320
Percentage	62.2%	37.4%
- Precinct results Hogsett: 50–60% 60–70% 70–80% 80–90% >90% Brewer: 50–60% 60–70% 70–80% Tie: 50% No votes
Mayor before election
Greg Ballard
Republican
Elected mayor
Joe Hogsett
Democratic

The Indianapolis mayoral election of 2015 took place on November 3, 2015. Voters elected the Mayor of Indianapolis, members of the Indianapolis City-County Council, as well as several other local officials. Incumbent Republican Greg Ballard did not run for re-election to a third term in office. Primary elections were held on May 5, 2015, with the Democrats nominating former secretary of state of Indiana and United States Attorney Joe Hogsett. Republicans nominated former Marine Chuck Brewer to face Hogsett.

The 2015 Indianapolis City-County elections took place alongside the mayoral election. This was the first election for the council without the four at-large seats, which were eliminated by the Indiana General Assembly. Democrats also won control of the council, with a 13–12 majority – only the second time since the formation of Unigov in 1970 that the Democrats had complete control of city government. They also swept all elected city and county offices for the first time since the formation of Unigov. This meant that, for the first time since the creation of the Unigov, the Democratic Party controlled both the Indianapolis mayoralty and City Council.

== Republican primary ==
Ahead of the primary, Brewer was seen as having strong odds of winning the Republican nomination.

=== Candidates ===
==== Declared ====
- Jocelyn-Tandy Adande, perennial candidate
- Chuck Brewer, businessman
- Terry Michael, real estate broker, former trustee of Fall Creek Township and candidate for the state senate in 2008
- Darrell Morris, firefighter and candidate in 2007
- Larry Shouse, janitor and candidate in 2007

==== Withdrew ====
- Olgen Williams, deputy mayor of Indianapolis

==== Declined ====
- Greg Ballard, incumbent mayor
- J. Murray Clark, former state senator, former chairman of the Indiana Republican Party and nominee for lieutenant governor of Indiana in 2000
- Charles Harrison, pastor and president of the Indianapolis Ten Point Coalition
- Richard Hite, Chief of the Indianapolis Metropolitan Police Department
- Ben Hunter, Indianapolis City-County Councilman
- Scott Keller, former Indianapolis City-County Councilman and nominee for the state house in 2012
- James W. Merritt, state senator
- Troy Riggs, Indianapolis Director of Public Safety
- Ryan Vaughn, president of Indiana Sports Corp. and former chief of staff to Mayor Ballard

=== Results ===
2015 Republican mayoral primary
Party	Candidate	Votes	%
Republican	Chuck Brewer	14,160	76.3
Republican	Jocelyn-Tandy Adande	1,783	9.6
Republican	Terry Michael	1,371	7.4
Republican	Larry Shouse	638	3.4
Republican	Darrell Morris	615	3.3
Total votes		18,567	100.0

== Democratic primary ==
Ahead of the primary, Hogsett was seen as having strong odds of capturing the Democratic nomination.

=== Candidates ===
==== Declared ====
- Joe Hogsett, former United States Attorney for the Southern District of Indiana and former secretary of state of Indiana
- Larry Vaughn, community activist

==== Withdrew ====
- Ed DeLaney, state representative
- Frank Short, Washington Township Trustee and former Indianapolis City-County Councilman (endorsed Hogsett)

==== Declined ====
- John Barth, Indianapolis City-County Councilman
- Charles Harrison, pastor and president of the Indianapolis Ten Point Coalition
- Maggie Lewis, president of the Indianapolis City-County Council (endorsed Hogsett)
- Brian Mahern, former Indianapolis City-County Councilman
- Vop Osili, Indianapolis City-County Councilman and nominee for Secretary of State of Indiana in 2010

=== Results ===
2015 Democratic mayoral primary
Party	Candidate	Votes	%
Democratic	Joe Hogsett	25,137	88.7
Democratic	Larry Vaughn	3,210	11.3
Total votes		28,347	100.0

== Libertarian nomination ==
=== Candidates ===
==== Declined ====
- Charles Harrison, pastor and president of the Indianapolis Ten Point Coalition

== Independents ==
=== Candidates ===
==== Dropped out ====
- Sam Carson, businessman, Democratic candidate for mayor in 2011, son of former U.S. Representative Julia Carson and uncle of U.S. Representative André Carson

==== Declined ====
- Charles Harrison, pastor and president of the Indianapolis Ten Point Coalition

== General election ==
Hogsett was seen as having strong odds of winning the election.

=== Results ===
Indianapolis mayoral election, 2015
Party	Candidate	Votes	%	±%
Democratic	Joe Hogsett	92,834	62.0	+14.9
Republican	Chuck Brewer	56,662	37.9	−13.4
No party	Write-Ins	221	0.1	—
Turnout		149,717	22.6	−7.3
Majority		36,172	24.2	
Democratic gain from Republican		Swing		
