= Indianapolis-Marion County City-County Council Proposal 156 =

Gun control ordinance passed in 2023

General Ordinance 34 (2023)
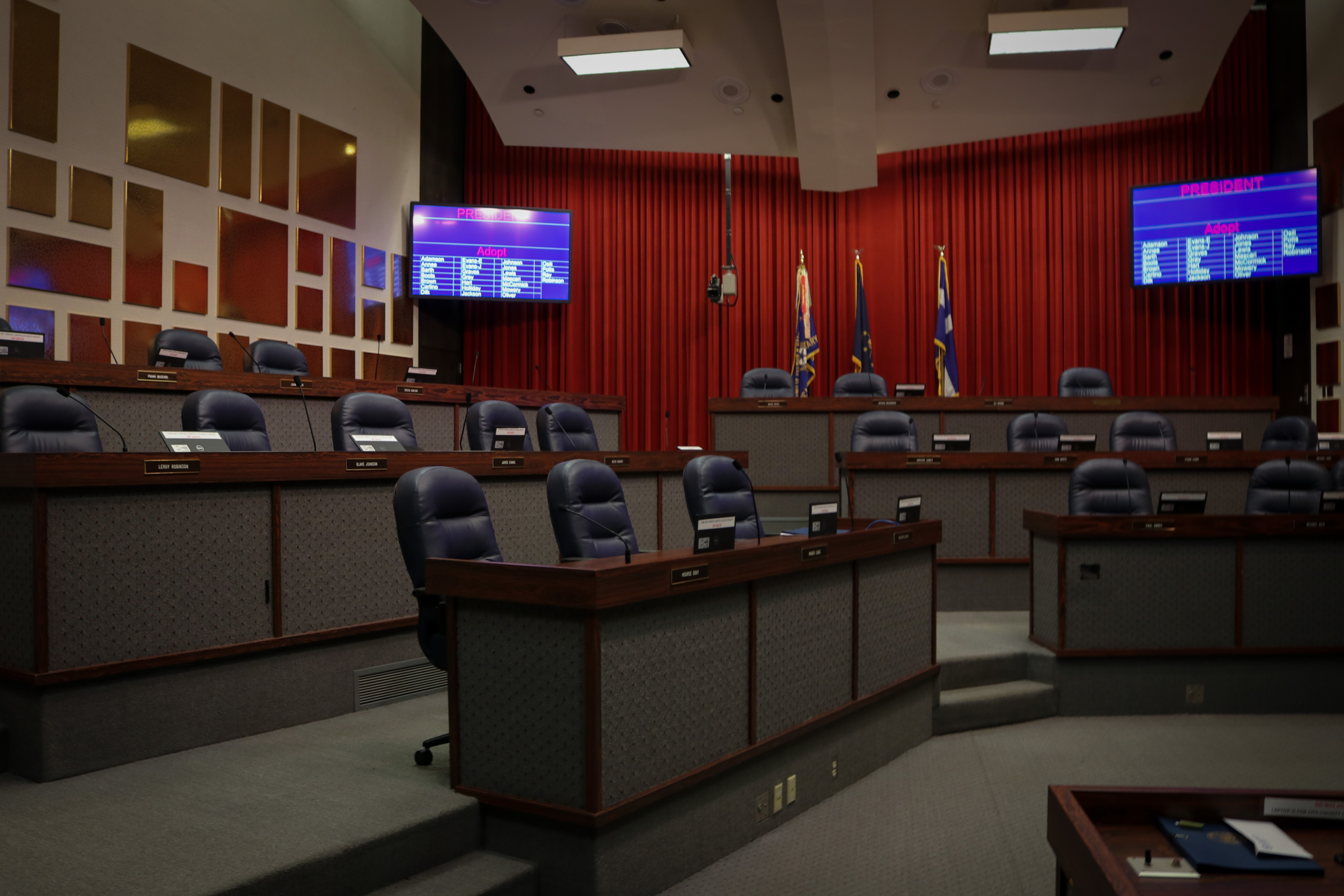

Indianapolis City-County Council
- Territorial extent: Indianapolis and Marion County, Indiana
- Passed: July 10, 2023
- Signed by: Mayor Joe Hogsett
- Signed: July 14, 2023
- Effective: July 14, 2023

Codification
- Revised Code of Indianapolis titles amended: Chapter 451

Legislative history
- Bill title: Proposal 156
- Voting summary: 18 voted for; 5 voted against; 1 absent; 1 present not voting

Related legislation
- Indiana Firearms Preemption Statute (Indiana Senate Bill 292 of 2011); Assault Weapons Ban of 2023 (U.S. Senate Bill 25)

Summary
- various gun control measures, including assault weapons ban

Keywords
- gun control, assault weapons ban, concealed carry, state preemption
- Status: In force

General Ordinance 34 (introduced as Proposal 156) of the Indianapolis-Marion County City-County Council is a local ordinance, passed in July 2023, that would enact various gun control measures within Indianapolis and Marion County if permitted by the Indiana state legislature. The ordinance's measures were proposed by Mayor Joe Hogsett's administration, and it was passed by the Democratic-controlled council. The passage took place during a mayoral election season, in which rising violent crime rates were a key election issue, and crime and gun control were a source of considerable debate locally and beyond.

== Background ==
=== State gun laws and preemption ===
Indiana has one of the least restrictive set of gun laws in the United States. In 2022, Indiana's permitless open carry law went into effect. The state government still issues licenses upon application, such as if an Indiana resident wants to be licensed while traveling out-of-state to states which recognize Indiana licenses. The legal age to purchase firearms is generally 18 years of age (with exceptions for family). There are no state restrictions on assault weapons.

Indiana state law also largely prevents local governments from enacting firearms regulations, so that no city or county may enforce stricter regulations than what the Indiana General Assembly has authorized. When the law came into effect in 2011, it invalidated existing local ordinances, such as one in Gary, Indiana. Similar preemption laws became common among Republican-controlled states seeking to rein in more liberal cities, and this measure is part of a larger trend of the Indiana state government passing preemption laws against cities that might seek to pass more liberal local regulations on issues such as minimum wage, sick leave, banking, and single-use plastics.

=== Indianapolis gun crimes ===
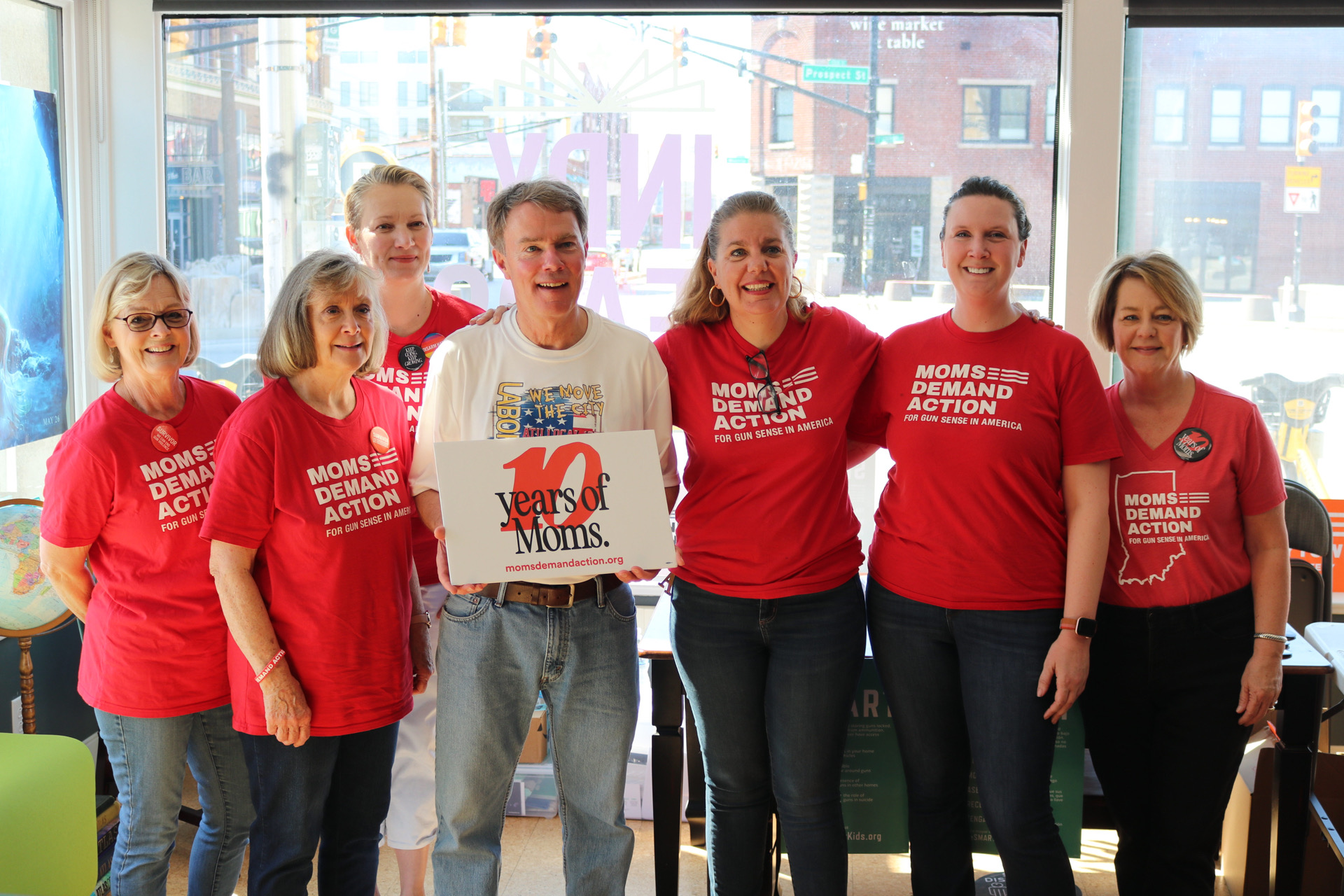
Indianapolis mayor Joe Hogsett meets with local Moms Demand Action activists on April 15, 2023.

In recent years, Indianapolis has contended with a rise in homicides, and also experienced several high-profile mass shootings, with the violent crime rate becoming one of the top political issues. Beginning in 2020, Indianapolis surpassed 200 murders in one year for the first time, and then repeated that tally again each year since. By June 10, 2023, over 100 homicides had been reported in 2023; over 65% of 2022 murders were unsolved.

In March 2021, 4 people, including a 7-year-old child, were shot to death execution-style in a domestic incident at a home on Randolph Street. In April 2021, the deadliest mass shooting in Indiana history occurred, when a shooter killed 8 workers, and himself, and injured 7, with an assault weapon at an Indianapolis FedEx facility. In May 2022, 5 people, including teenagers, were injured (one self-inflicted) in a shootout at the Indianapolis Canal Walk, one of downtown's most-frequented tourist areas. In 2022, just days after the constitutional carry state law went into effect, a mass shooting at Greenwood Park Mall just outside of Indianapolis left 3 dead and 2 injured before the shooter was killed by an armed bystander. In April 2023, a high school student at Arsenal Technical High School was murdered, and had been discovered by a school bus full of children shortly before dying.

On April 21, 2023, the incident that was most cited as instigating the proposal occurred, when a suspect being pursued by Indianapolis police opened fire with an AR-15 style assault weapon—injuring two officers. After the event, dramatic photos showed a police vehicle riddled in bullet holes through the hood, and driver-side windshield and door. In June, 2023, 3 people were killed and one injured in a shooting on a busy corner in the Broad Ripple neighborhood, an entertainment district with 400–500 people in the area at the time. On July 3, a 16-year-old girl was killed in a quadruple shooting at a neighborhood block party in Forest Manor.

== Measures ==
The ordinance revises Chapter 451 of the Revised Code of Indianapolis, relating to public health and welfare. It includes four gun control-related measures:

- Raising the minimum age to purchase firearms from 18 to 21
- Banning purchase, sale, possession, or firing of a semiautomatic assault weapon
- Requiring a valid license to possess a handgun
- Banning concealed carry of a firearm

The ordinance adopts the definition of firearms found in the Indiana Code as pertains to the concealed carry measure, and for the assault weapon ban adopts the definition of "semiautomatic assault weapon" found in the federal Assault Weapons Ban of 2023 bill.

In addition to the measures directly related to gun control, there is also language which attempts to prevent any conflict with the state's preemption law for local gun regulation. The ordinance acknowledges its unenforceability and states any part of its gun control measures will only take effect at such time as it becomes enforceable under relevant governing laws as determined by the county counsel.

== Legislative history ==
=== Proposal ===
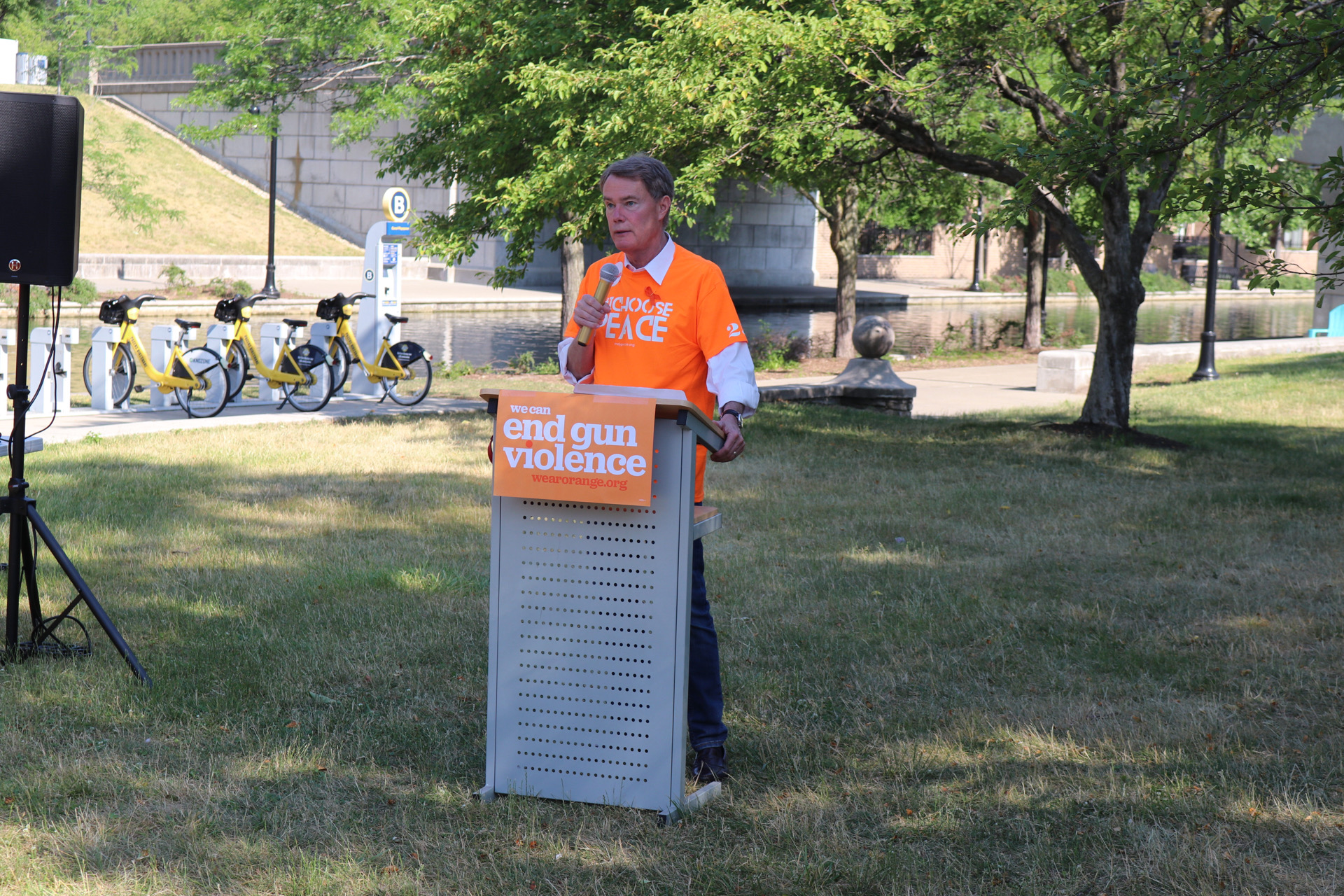
On June 2, 2023, Hogsett speaks at a gun violence prevention event at White River State Park.

The measures in the proposal were originally proposed by Indianapolis mayor, Joe Hogsett, who, at the time, had been mayor since 2015 and was running for re-election to his third term in office. Hogsett was running against a better-funded opponent in what was seen as likely to be a more competitive election than his first re-election bid. His Republican opponent, Jefferson Shreve—a self-funding wealthy businessperson and former city councilor—made public safety the cornerstone of his successful primary campaign. In 2022, as a result of the rising gun crimes in the city, Hogsett had rolled out a three-year crime reduction plan, which included increases to the policing budget for hiring and technology, as well as grants for grassroots violence interrupters.

At a May 25, 2023 media event, Hogsett announced the proposed gun control measures along with a slew of other policy proposals aimed at curbing violent crime. The other plans included raising police pay and retention incentives; hiring three prosecutors to serve on detail for the US Attorney's office; boosting summer youth programs; cracking down on bars and other businesses with high rates of crime, under the state nuisance law; and giving the city the power to declare and enforce gun-free zones, when applied for during the permitting process for special events. Hogsett referred to the weapons being banned by the proposal as "military-style". The proposal was seen as a key part of Hogsett's election-year public safety platform, with crime being one of the most important issues to voters, and one on which his Republican opponent Jefferson Shreve was most sharply critical of Hogsett.

=== Legislative action ===
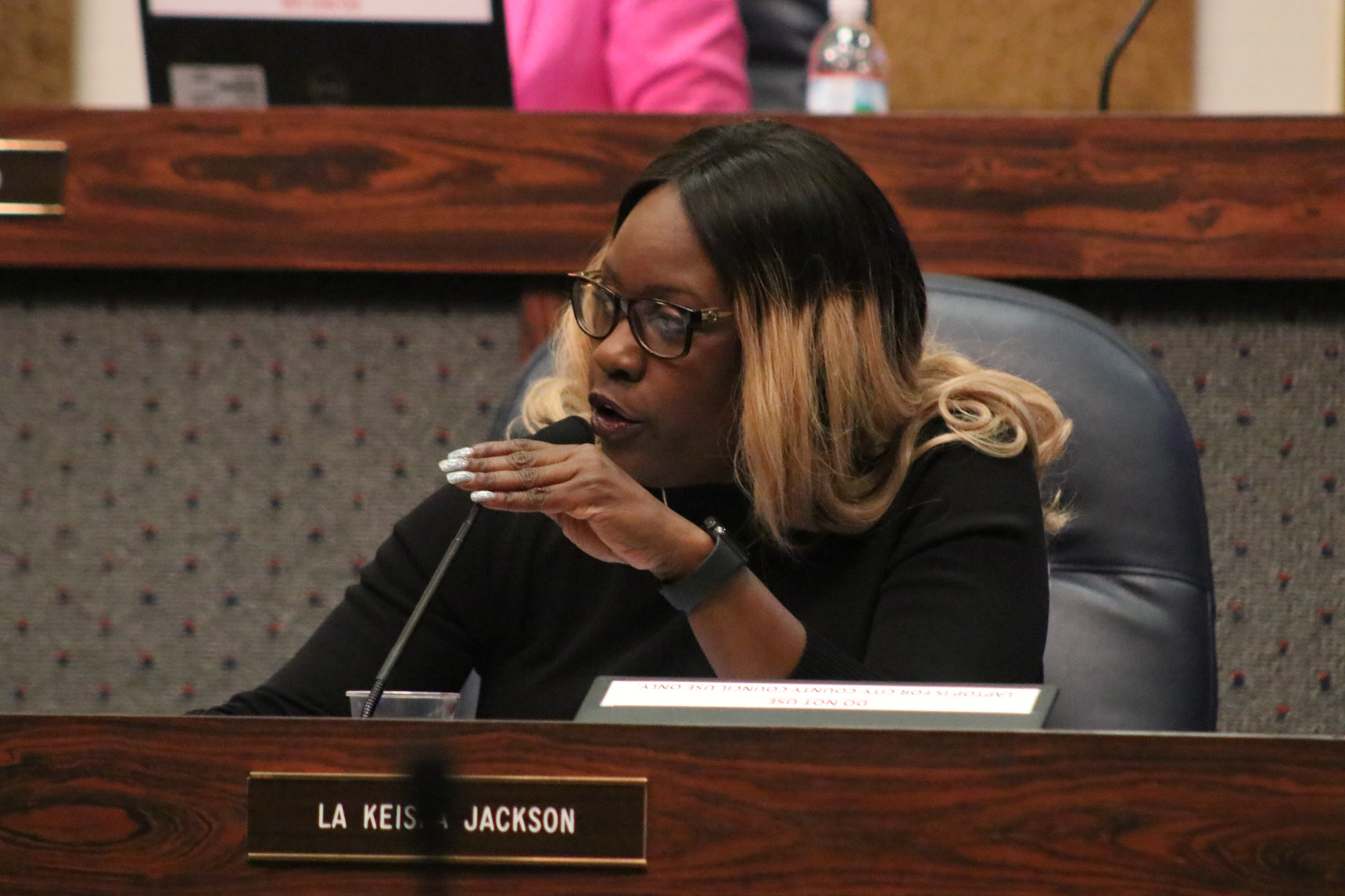
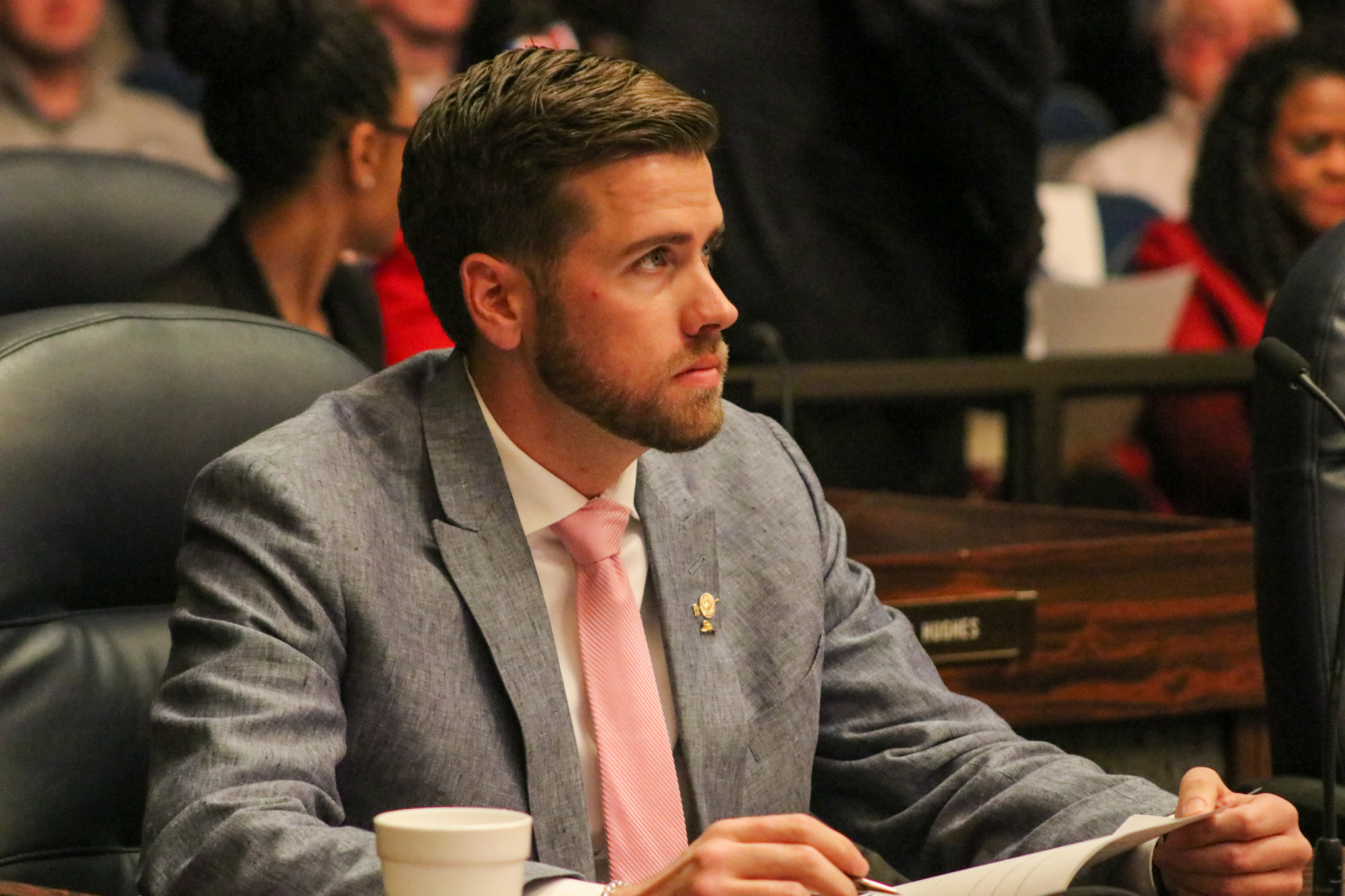
Councilors Jackson (top) and Mowery (bottom) each gave impassioned speeches on competing sides of the proposal at the July 10, 2023 council meeting.

The legislation was introduced as Proposal 156 on June 5, 2023, by councilors LeRoy Robinson (chair of the Public Safety and Criminal Justice Committee), Vop Osili (council president), Zach Adamson, Maggie Lewis, Dan Boots and John Barth. At a June 14, 2023 meeting of the Public Safety and Criminal Justice Committee, the proposal was passed out of committee with a do-pass recommendation. At the hearing, Hogsett gave a speech in favor of the proposal, and described a campaign to pressure him to withdraw the proposal—including at least one threat that was being investigated by the Indianapolis police. Also at the committee hearings, Hogsett spoke out against the state preemption law on gun control, arguing for "the people of Indianapolis to have the right to craft their own laws on this critical issue".

On July 10, 2023, the full City-County Council overwhelmingly approved Proposal 156, along with other measures as part of the mayor's public safety package, on a party-line vote with all five Republicans opposed and 18 Democrats in favor (one Democrat not present, and abstaining). At the hearing, several councilors gave heated statements before casting their votes. Councilor La Keisha Jackson recounted her own experience being injured during a 2015 mass shooting at the Washington Square Mall. Democratic councilor Keith Potts, who is also running in the Democratic primary for 2024 US Senate election, strongly supported the proposal. Republicans on the council fiercely opposed the proposal, calling it unenforceable and symbolic. In their statements, Republican Minority Leader Brian Mowery argued the proposal was unconstitutional and called it "toothless", while fellow Republican councilor Joshua Bain referred to it as "propaganda" and framing the approach as a "woke agenda that's being pushed by a woke prosecutor with a false narrative of systemic injustices." Mowery also stated that he had consulted with Attorney General Todd Rokita's office and been advised the proposal violated state law. Upon adoption, the proposal was assigned General Ordinance 34, and signed into law by Hogsett on July 14, 2023.

== Reactions ==
=== City officials ===
The proposal was supported by all major Democrats at the city and state level. Aside from the mayor and Democratic city councilors, the proposal was supported by Marion County Prosecutor Ryan Mears, Indianapolis Metropolitan Police Department Chief Randall Taylor, Marion County Sheriff Kerry Forrestal, and Corporation Counsel Matt Giffin. Giffin, the city/county lawyer who would be responsible for invoking the law if it becomes enforceable, defended its constitutionality by describing it as a trigger law to go into effect if the state legislature or the courts allowed it. At each hearing, a large contingent of Moms Demand Action Indianapolis activists in red shirts sat in the gallery and spoke in support of the proposal.

=== State-level ===
Because of the issues around the state preemption law and the proposal's constitutionality, many state-level figures weighed in on the debate. Democratic State Senate Minority Leader Greg Taylor—who represents part of Indianapolis—strongly supported the measures, and also argued in favor of changing the state preemption law and other state gun control measures, like stronger background checks. However, with Republicans holding a large majority in the Indiana General Assembly, there was no expectation that the state government would change the preemption law, or even take up the issue at all. Republican state senator Jack Sandlin, who also represents an Indianapolis district, stated "I don't see that this is something that we’re gonna change." State Republicans expressed that the ordinance was a meaningless political move in an election season.

After the passage of the proposal, Republican state senator Aaron Freeman, who represents a part of Indianapolis, requested a legal opinion from Republican state Attorney General Todd Rokita. Rokita's office issued a Memorandum of Legal Guidance on July 13 that asserted the ordinance was unconstitutional and declared it an "effort to distract the public." Republican state senator Jim Tomes, representing Wadesville, who authored the 2011 state gun control preemption law, called the ordinance "a direct violation of State law" and referred to its passage as "unethical and hypocritical". The National Association for Gun Rights issued a statement calling the ordinance a violation of state law, and the state and federal constitutions, and calling on Attorney General Rokita to "nullify" the ordinance.

=== Effect on mayoral election ===
Not all local Republicans were strongly against the ordinance, with one notable exception being Republican mayoral candidate Jefferson Shreve. Prior to the passage of the bill, Shreve had not taken a clear stance on the specific measures in the proposal. During the primary, he stated he was open to gun reforms if advocated by the city's police. With the ordinance being debated and voted on during the mayoral campaign, Hogsett's campaign attempted to use paint Shreve as too pro-gun, pointing to his past votes on the city-county council and his "A" rating from the National Rifle Association of America during his State Senate campaign in 2016. Shreve, meanwhile, downplayed his past positions on guns, while dismissing the mayor's actions as political, and not serious solutions.

Facing pressure to release a competing proposal on fighting gun crime, Shreve released his public safety plan on July 14, after the passage of the ordinance at a media event held near the site of the Broad Ripple mass shooting in June. In addition to other proposals, Shreve's plan notably included all of the major gun control measures in the already-passed ordinance, including the assault weapon ban, with the exception of the ban on concealed carry of a handgun. His campaign released an ad stating "Here's the truth; Jefferson Shreve supports the ban on assault weapons and the repeal of permitless carry." Shreve criticized Hogsett's administration for focusing on an unenforceable ordinance during an election season after 8 years in office, after the state legislative session was already over. He argued he would have better success actually getting the proposals through the state legislature, and had already started conversations with lawmakers.

Shreve's plan was seen as a break from his past gun rights advocacy, and an attempt to appeal to the majority-Democratic Indianapolis electorate, with political reporter James Briggs called Shreve's embrace of gun control "remarkable for a Republican". Hogsett's campaign called the announcement a "flip-flop". Shreve's proposals were met with some backlash from conservatives, with Freeman calling his position a "mistake" while still endorsing him, and local rightwing talk radio station WIBC's hosts predicting it could cost him the election. The NRA released a statement harshly criticizing the ordinance and Shreve's plan, advocating for more prosecution of the violent crimes themselves without placing additional restrictions on gun ownership. In response to the backlash, Greg Ballard—Indianapolis's last Republican mayor—and Paul Helmke—a former Republican mayor of Fort Wayne, Indiana and 1998 US Senate nominee—both came out in support of Shreve.
