= 2023 Indianapolis mayoral election =

- November 7, 2023
- Turnout: 26.51% ▲2.27 pp
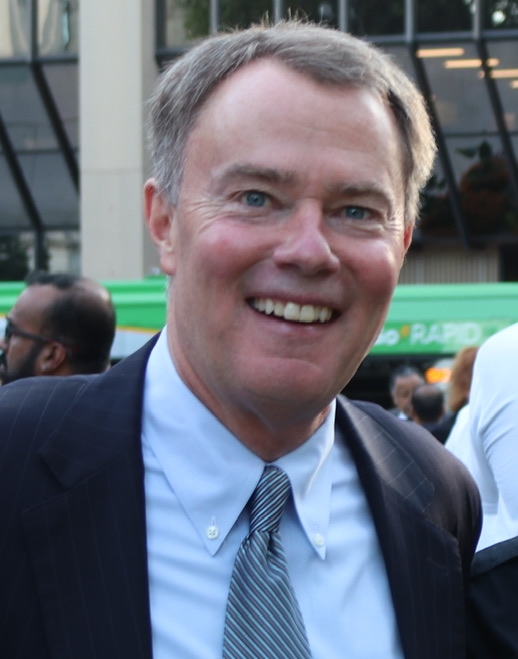

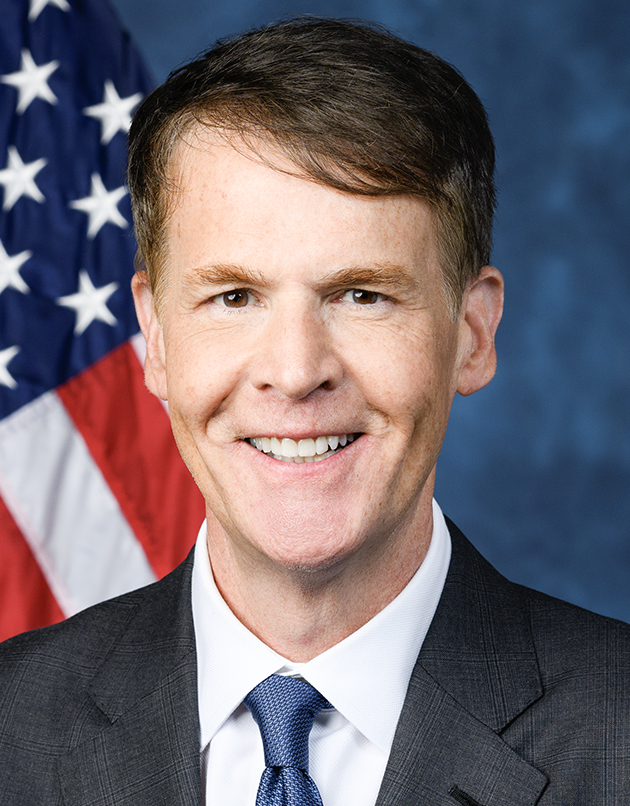
Candidate	Joe Hogsett	Jefferson Shreve
Party	Democratic	Republican
Popular vote	97,311	66,214
Percentage	59.5%	40.5%
- Precinct results Hogsett: 50–60% 60–70% 70–80% 80–90% >90% Shreve: 50–60% 60–70% 70–80% Tie: 50% No votes
Mayor before election
Joe Hogsett
Democratic
Elected mayor
Joe Hogsett
Democratic

An election for Mayor of Indianapolis was held on November 7, 2023. Primary elections were held on May 2. Incumbent Democratic mayor Joe Hogsett sought and won re-election to a third term in office. Hogsett and Republican Jefferson Shreve advanced to the general election. Shreve was later elected to the U.S. House of Representatives in the 2024 elections, representing Indiana's 6th congressional district. Shreve had the best performance of a Republican since Greg Ballard in 2011. Hogsett performed 12 points worse than he did in 2019.

== Democratic primary ==
=== Candidates ===
==== Nominee ====
- Joe Hogsett, incumbent mayor

==== Eliminated in primary ====
- Bob Kern, retired paralegal and perennial candidate
- Robin Shackleford, Indiana state representative
- Larry Vaughn, community activist

==== Withdrawn ====
- Clif Marsiglio, educator (remained on ballot, endorsed Shackleford)
- Gregory Meriweather, community engagement consultant (remained on ballot, endorsed Shackleford)

=== Endorsements ===
Robin Shackleford

Individuals

- Jeffrey Johnson Sr., senior pastor of Eastern Star Church

Organizations

- Indiana Black Legislative Caucus PAC

=== Results ===
Democratic primary
Party	Candidate	Votes	%
Democratic	Joe Hogsett (incumbent)	28,273	58.4
Democratic	Robin Shackleford	18,340	37.9
Democratic	Bob Kern	693	1.4
Democratic	Gregory Meriweather (withdrawn)	471	1.0
Democratic	Clif Marsiglio (withdrawn)	365	0.8
Democratic	Larry Vaughn	293	0.6
Total votes		48,435	100.0

== Republican primary ==
=== Candidates ===
==== Nominee ====
- Jefferson Shreve, former city councilor

==== Eliminated in primary ====
- John Couch, business owner
- James Jackson, pastor
- Abdul-Hakim Shabazz, political reporter

==== Declined ====
- Joe Elsener, chair of the Marion County Republican Party
- Steve Sorrel, businessman

=== Results ===
Republican primary
Party	Candidate	Votes	%
Republican	Jefferson Shreve	19,152	65.9
Republican	Abdul-Hakim Shabazz	7,629	26.3
Republican	James Jackson	1,250	4.3
Republican	John Couch	1,036	3.6
Total votes		29,067	100.0

== General election ==
=== Polling ===
Poll source	Date(s) administered	Sample size (Note: Key: A – all adults RV – registered voters LV – likely voters V – unclear)	Margin of error	Joe Hogsett (D)	Jefferson Shreve (R)	Undecided
Indy Politics/Crossroads Public Affairs	September 24–25, 2023	400 (LV)	± 4.9%	47%	37%	16%

=== Debates ===
Date	Time (ET)	Host	Moderator(s)	Ref
October 8, 2023	5:00 pm	African American Coalition of Indianapolis; Indianapolis Recorder; Radio One	Cameron Ridle; Oseye Boyd	
October 23, 2023	7:00 pm	WISH-TV	Phil Sanchez; Katiera Winfrey	
October 26, 2023	7:00 pm	CBS 4 FOX 59	Dan Spehler	

=== Endorsements ===
Jefferson Shreve

Statewide officials

- Mitch Daniels, former Governor of Indiana (2005–2013)

=== Results ===
2023 Indianapolis mayoral election
Party	Candidate	Votes	%	±%
Democratic	Joe Hogsett (Incumbent)	97,311	59.5	
Republican	Jefferson Shreve	66,214	40.5	
Total votes		163,525	100.0	
