= Robin Shackleford =

American politician from Indiana

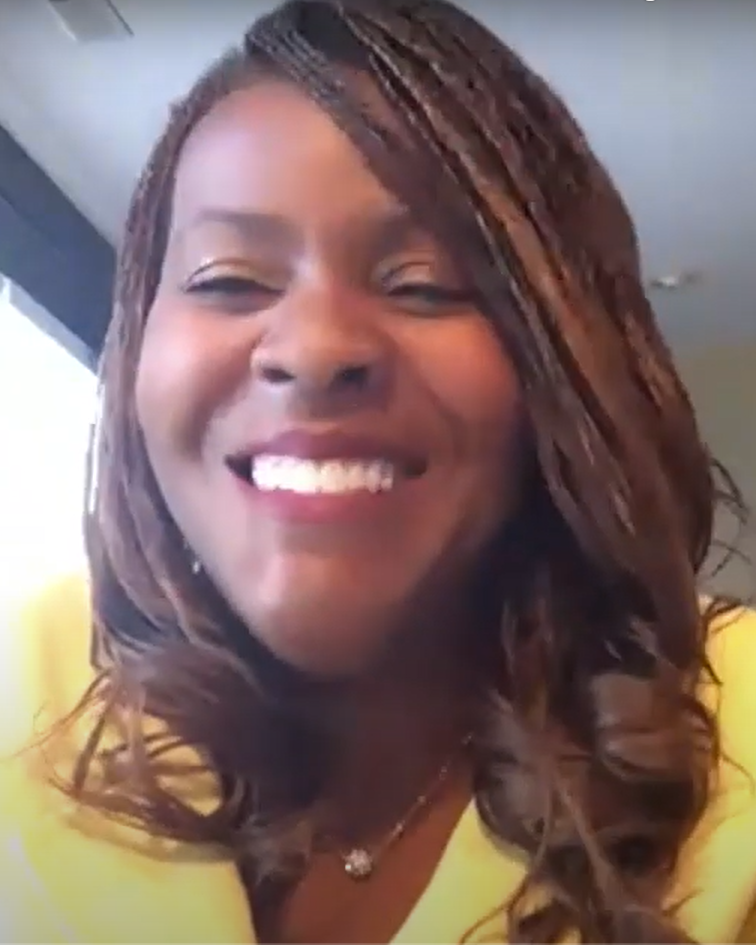
- Shackleford in 2022

Member of the Indiana House of Representatives from the 98th district
- Incumbent
- Assumed office November 20, 2012
- Preceded by: Bill Crawford

Personal details
- Born: October 30, 1970 (age 55) Indianapolis, Indiana, U.S.
- Party: Democratic

Robin C. Shackleford (born October 30, 1970) is an American politician who has served in the Indiana House of Representatives from the 98th district since 2012.

On November 10, 2022, Shackleford announced her intention to run for mayor of Indianapolis in 2023. Shackleford lost to incumbent Mayor Joe Hogsett by 20.5 percent in the 2023 Democratic primary.
