= 2015 Indianapolis City-County Council election =

- November 3, 2015

All 25 seats on the Indianapolis City-County Council 13 seats needed for a majority
	Majority party	Minority party
Leader	Monroe Gray	Mike McQuillen
Party	Democratic	Republican
Leader's seat	District 8	District 4
Last election	15 seats	14 seats
Seats won	13 seats	12 seats
- Popular vote district

The 2015 Indianapolis City–County Council elections took place on November 3, 2015. With all 25 seats up for election, this was the first for the council with newly redrawn districts and without the four at-large seats, which were eliminated by the Republican-controlled Indiana General Assembly in 2013. Before the elections Democrats held a 15–14-seat majority. Primaries for the council were held on May 5, 2015, with a handful of races being very close. The closest finish came in district one, with two Democratic incumbents forced into a run-off election because of the redistricting. Leroy Robinson defeated Angela Mansfield by only 26 votes. Following the elections Democrats maintained control of the council with a 13–12 majority. In the Indianapolis mayoral election held at the same time, Democrat Joe Hogsett beat Republican Chuck Brewer. This was only the second time in the history of Indianapolis that Democrats controlled both the mayor's office and the council.

== Results summary ==
Parties	Seats			Popular vote		
Parties	2011	2015	Strength	Vote	Percent	Change
Democratic Party	15	13	52%	79,122	54.247%	---
Republican Party	14	12	48%	64,215	44.026%	---
Libertarian Party	0	0	0%	2,519	1.727%	---
Totals	29	25	100%	145,856	100%	-

=== Close races ===
Seats where the margin of victory was under 10%:

1. Council District 2, 1.8% gain
2. Council District 19, 4.2%
3. Council District 22, 8.2% gain

=== Results by district ===
City-County Council District 1
Party	Candidate	Votes	%	±%
Democratic	Leroy Robinson (incumbent) (Note: Former councilor-at-large.)	4,217	61.4%	
Republican	Brian Jones	2,656	38.6%	
Turnout		6,873		

City-County Council District 2
Party	Candidate	Votes	%	±%
Republican	Colleen Fanning	4,959	49.1%	
Democratic	Kip Tew (incumbent)	4,783	47.3%	
Libertarian	Sam Goldstein	360	3.6%	
Turnout		10,102		

City-County Council District 3
Party	Candidate	Votes	%	±%
Republican	Christine Scales (incumbent) (Note: Scales had been councilor of the old district 4.)	4,489	54.6%	
Democratic	Pamela Hickman (incumbent)	3,511	42.7%	
Libertarian	Christopher Bowen	226	2.7%	
Turnout		8,226		

City-County Council District 4
Party	Candidate	Votes	%	±%
Republican	Mike McQuillen (incumbent) (Note: McQuillen had been councilor of the old district 12.)	4,156	58.9%	
Democratic	Ray Biederman	2,901	41.1%	
Turnout		7,057		

City-County Council District 5
Party	Candidate	Votes	%	±%
Republican	Jeff Coats	4,451	55.2%	
Democratic	Curtis Bigsbee	3,610	44.8%	
Turnout		8,061		

City-County Council District 6
Party	Candidate	Votes	%	±%
Republican	Janice Shattuck McHenry (incumbent)	3,798	60.8%	
Democratic	Frank Islas	2,446	39.2%	
Turnout		6,244		

City-County Council District 7
Party	Candidate	Votes	%	±%
Democratic	Joseph Simpson (incumbent) (Note: Simpson had been councilor of the old district 9.)	5,808	71.7%	
Republican	Adrienne Slash	2,291	28.3%	
Turnout		8,099		

City-County Council District 8
Party	Candidate	Votes	%	±%
Democratic	Monroe Gray, Jr (incumbent)	5,433	78.3%	
Republican	Patrick Milda	1,506	21.7%	
Turnout		6,939		

City-County Council District 9
Party	Candidate	Votes	%	±%
Democratic	William Oliver (incumbent) (Note: Oliver had been councilor of the old district 10.)	6,358	82.6%	
Republican	Chuck Madden	1,342	17.4%	
Turnout		7,700		

City-County Council District 10
Party	Candidate	Votes	%	±%
Democratic	Maggie Lewis (incumbent) (Note: Lewis had been councilor of the old district 7.)	2,950	80.1%	
Republican	Terry Bible	732	19.9%	
Turnout		3,682		

City-County Council District 11
Party	Candidate	Votes	%	±%
Democratic	Vop Osili (incumbent) (Note: Osili had been councilor of the old district 15.)	4,677	86.6%	
Republican	Remington O'Guin	724	13.4%	
Turnout		5,401		

City-County Council District 12
Party	Candidate	Votes	%	±%
Democratic	Blake Johnson	3,307	59.6%	
Republican	Susan Marie Smith	1,913	34.5%	
Libertarian	Michael Gunyon	325	5.9%	
Turnout		5,545		

City-County Council District 13
Party	Candidate	Votes	%	±%
Democratic	Stephen Clay (incumbent) (Note: Clay had been councilor of the old district 11.)	4,737	84.2%	
Republican	Terri Miller-Penquite	888	15.8%	
Turnout		5,625		

City-County Council District 14
Party	Candidate	Votes	%	±%
Democratic	La Keisha Jackson (incumbent) (Note: Jackson had been councilor of the old district 18.)	2,984	80.7%	
Republican	Terry Dove	714	19.3%	
Turnout		3,698		

City-County Council District 15
Party	Candidate	Votes	%	±%
Republican	Marilyn Pfisterer (incumbent) (Note: Pfisterer had been councilor of the old district 14.)	2,659	57.4%	
Democratic	Christopher Wall	1,753	37.8%	
Libertarian	Laurie Works	224	4.8%	
Turnout		4,636		

City-County Council District 16
Party	Candidate	Votes	%	±%
Republican	Jeff Miller (incumbent) (Note: Miller had been councilor of the old district 19.)	1,751	56.6%	
Democratic	Emily Shrock	1,345	43.4%	
Turnout		3,096		

City-County Council District 17
Party	Candidate	Votes	%	±%
Democratic	Zach Adamson (incumbent) (Note: Adamson had been councilor of the old district 16.)	4,582	84.6%	
Republican	Sally Spiers	833	15.4%	
Turnout		5,415		

City-County Council District 18
Party	Candidate	Votes	%	±%
Republican	Susie Cordi	2,990	57.9%	
Democratic	Eddie Barnes	2,171	42.1%	
Turnout		5,161		

City-County Council District 19
Party	Candidate	Votes	%	±%
Democratic	David Ray	3,167	52.1%	
Republican	Benjamin Hunter (incumbent) (Note: Hunter had been councilor of the old district 21.)	2,907	47.9%	
Turnout		6,074		

City-County Council District 20
Party	Candidate	Votes	%	±%
Republican	Jason Holliday (incumbent) (Note: Holliday had been councilor of the old district 22.)	2,842	61.8%	
Democratic	Jon Easter	1,760	38.2%	
Turnout		4,602		

City-County Council District 21
Party	Candidate	Votes	%	±%
Democratic	Frank Mascari (incumbent) (Note: Mascari had been councilor of the old district 20.)	3,037	60.1%	
Republican	Anthony Davidson	2,013	39.9%	
Turnout		5,050		

City-County Council District 22
Party	Candidate	Votes	%	±%
Democratic	Jared Evans	1,872	54.1%	
Republican	Robert Lutz (incumbent) (Note: Lutz had been councilor of the old district 13.)	1,586	45.9%	
Turnout		3,458		

City-County Council District 23
Party	Candidate	Votes	%	±%
Republican	Scott Kreider	3,878	80.2%	
Libertarian	Douglas McNaughton	957	19.8%	
Turnout		4,835		

City-County Council District 24
Party	Candidate	Votes	%	±%
Republican	Jack Sandlin (incumbent)	3,950	100%	
Turnout		3,950		

City-County Council District 25
Party	Candidate	Votes	%	±%
Republican	Aaron Freeman (incumbent)	4,187	66.2%	
Democratic	Jeff Wheeler	1,713	27.1%	
Libertarian	Mike Jasper	427	6.7%	
Turnout		6,327		
