= Senator Head =

Senator Head may refer to:

- Chris Head (politician) (born 1963), Virginia State Senate
- John W. Head (1822–1874), Tennessee State Senate
- Nathaniel Head (1828–1883), New Hampshire State Senate
- Orson S. Head (1817–1875), Wisconsin State Senate
- Randy Head (born 1968), Indiana State Senate
