= 2019 Indianapolis mayoral election =

- November 5, 2019
- Turnout: 24.24% ▲1.56pp
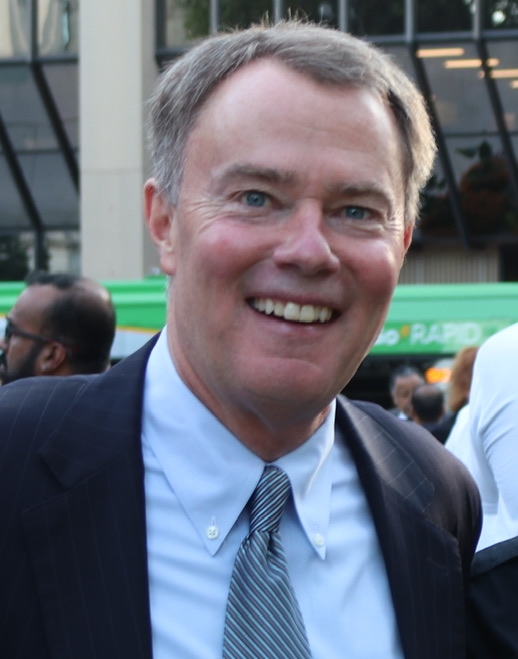

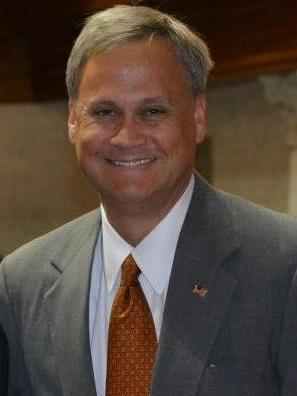
Nominee	Joe Hogsett	Jim Merritt
Party	Democratic	Republican
Popular vote	109,084	40,903
Percentage	71.60%	26.85%
- Precinct results Hogsett: 40–50% 50–60% 60–70% 70–80% 80–90% >90% Merritt: 40–50% 50–60% 60–70% Tie: 40–50% No votes
Mayor before election
Joe Hogsett
Democratic
Elected mayor
Joe Hogsett
Democratic

An election for Mayor of Indianapolis was held on November 5, 2019. Joe Hogsett, the incumbent mayor, sought and won reelection for a second term in office.

== Nominations ==
=== Democratic primary ===
==== Candidates ====
===== Declared =====
- Denise Paul Hatch
- Joe Hogsett, incumbent Mayor of Indianapolis

==== Results ====
Democratic primary results
Party	Candidate	Votes	%
Democratic	Joe Hogsett (incumbent)	29,111	83.83%
Democratic	Denise Paul Hatch	5,615	16.17%
Total votes		34,726	

=== Republican primary ===
==== Candidates ====
===== Declared =====
- Jim Merritt, chair of the Marion County Republican Party and State Senator
- Christopher James Moore, dump truck driver
- Felipe Rios

===== Withdrawn candidates =====
- Jose Evans, former member of Indianapolis City-County Council and former Democrat
- John Schmitz, real estate developer

===== Potential candidates that did not run =====
- Greg Ballard, former mayor of Indianapolis
- Jeff Cardwell, former chair of the Indiana Republican Party and former member of Indianapolis City-County Council
- Ted Feeney, former president of Butler-Tarkington Neighborhood Association
- Cindy Kirchhofer, state representative
- Jamal Smith, executive director of the Indiana Civil Rights Commission

==== Results ====
Republican primary results
Party	Candidate	Votes	%
Republican	James W. Merritt Jr.	14,910	82.75%
Republican	Christopher James Moore	2,622	14.55%
Republican	Felipe Rios	486	2.70%
Total votes		18,018	

=== Libertarian candidates ===
- Douglas McNaughton

=== Independent candidates ===
- John Schmitz, masonry contractor (failed to make ballot)

== General election ==
Indianapolis mayoral election, 2019
Party	Candidate	Votes	%	±%
Democratic	Joseph H. Hogsett (Incumbent)	109,084	71.60	+9.59%
Republican	James W. Merritt Jr.	40,903	26.85	−11.00%
Libertarian	Douglas John "Mac" McNaughton	2,353	1.54	
No party	Write-Ins	10	0.01	—
Turnout		152,350	23.98	
Majority		68,181	44.75%	
Democratic hold		Swing		
