= Kerry Forestal =

American politician

Member of the Indiana Senate from the 31st district
- Incumbent
- Assumed office November 4, 2026
- Preceded by: Kyle Walker

Personal details
- Party: Democratic

Kerry Forestal is an American politician. A member of the Democratic Party, he had served in the Indiana Senate since 2026, representing the 31st district.
