= Zachary A. Myers =

American lawyer (born 1981)

Zachary Myers
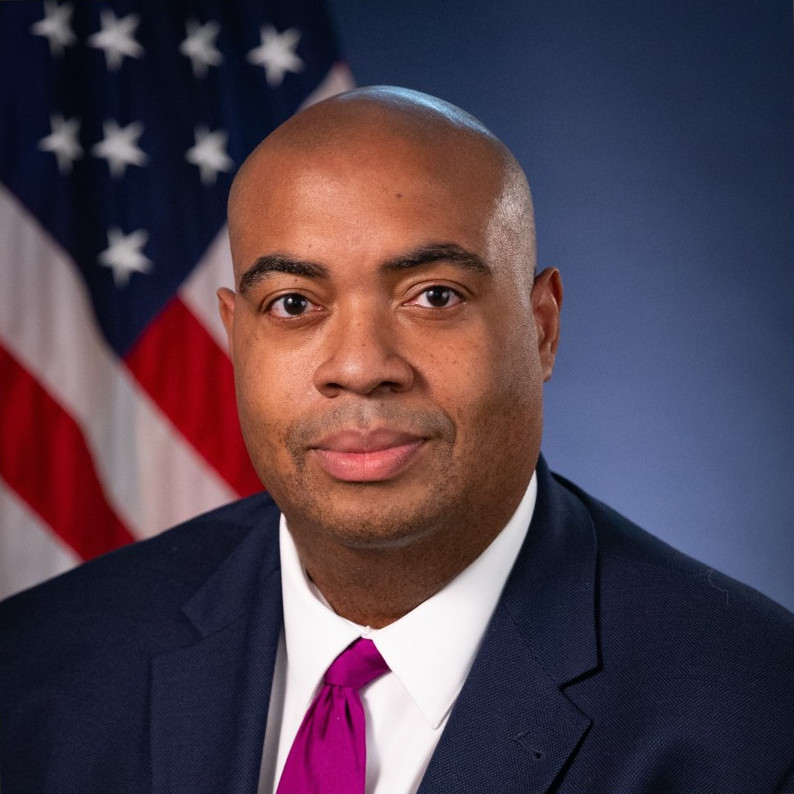

United States Attorney for the Southern District of Indiana
- In office November 15, 2021 – January 18, 2025
- Appointed by: Joe Biden
- Preceded by: Joshua Minkler
- Succeeded by: John E. Childress (acting)

Personal details
- Born: 1981 (age 44–45) Stanford, California, U.S.
- Relations: Woody Myers (father)
- Education: Stanford University (BA); George Washington University (MA); Georgetown University (JD)

Zachary Augustus Myers (born 1981) is an American lawyer who was the United States attorney for the Southern District of Indiana.

== Early life and education ==
Myers was born in Stanford, California, and raised in Indiana, the son of Woody Myers, a physician and political candidate. He earned a Bachelor of Arts degree in political science from Stanford University, a Master of Arts in political management from The Graduate School of Political Management in 2003, and a Juris Doctor from the Georgetown University Law Center in 2008.

== Career ==
From 2003 to 2005, Myers served as a legislative correspondent for Congresswoman Julia Carson. From 2008 to 2011, Myers was an attorney at Baker & Daniels in Indianapolis. He then served as assistant United States attorney for the Southern District of Indiana from 2011 to 2014. He joined the United States District Court for the District of Maryland as assistant U.S. attorney in 2014 and became the district's cybersecurity counsel.

=== United States attorney ===
On July 26, 2021, President Joe Biden nominated Myers to be the United States attorney for the Southern District of Indiana. On September 23, 2021, his nomination was reported out of committee. On September 30, 2021, his nomination was confirmed in the United States Senate by voice vote. On November 15, 2021, he was sworn in by Chief Judge Tanya Walton Pratt. He resigned as United States Attorney on January 18, 2025.
