= William Vobach =

American politician (1929–2020)

Member of the Indiana Senate from the 31st district
- In office November 3, 1982 – November 7, 1990
- Preceded by: Dan Burton
- Succeeded by: James W. Merritt

Personal details
- Born: December 25, 1929 Chicago, Illinois, U.S.
- Died: June 16, 2020 (aged 90) Centennial, Colorado, U.S.
- Party: Republican
- Spouse: Isabella
- Children: 3
- Education: Oberlin College (BA); University of Michigan (JD)
- Occupation: lawyer

William Herman Vobach (December 25, 1929 – May 31, 2020) was an American politician from the state of Indiana. A Republican, he served in the Indiana State Senate from 1983 to 1990. He was a lawyer.
