= Joshua Minkler =

American attorney

Joshua J. Minkler
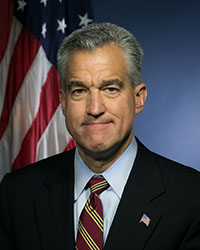

United States Attorney for the Southern District of Indiana
- In office August 1, 2014 – November 21, 2020; Acting: August 1, 2014 – October 10, 2017
- President: Barack Obama; Donald Trump
- Preceded by: Joe Hogsett
- Succeeded by: Zachary A. Myers

Personal details
- Education: Wabash College (BA); Indiana University, Bloomington (JD)

Joshua Minkler is an American attorney who is a partner at Barnes & Thornburg. He served as the United States Attorney for the United States District Court for the Southern District of Indiana from October 2017 through November 2020. He served as interim U.S. Attorney for the same district from August 2014 until September 2017. He was first became interim U.S. Attorney when Joe Hogsett stepped down from the position. He was appointed to the position by Attorney General Eric Holder in February 2015 and was unanimously appointed by the United States District Court for the Southern District of Indiana in June 2015. He was confirmed for the position by the United States Senate in 2017. Minkler graduated from Wabash College in 1985 and Indiana University Maurer School of Law in 1988. Prior to assuming his role as a U.S. Attorney, Minkler served for 21 years as an Assistant United States Attorney in the Southern District of Indiana, where he held the positions of First Assistant United States Attorney and Chief of the Drug and Violent Crime Unit. Before he joined the U.S. Attorney's office, Minkler served for five years as an assistant prosecuting attorney in the office of the Kent County, Michigan, prosecuting attorney, where he prosecuted violent crimes.

In 2017, after the U.S. Attorney in Kentucky recused himself, Minkler took over the prosecution of Renee Boucher in the assault case where Boucher was alleged to have attacked Kentucky Senator Rand Paul.

In November 2020, Minkler announced his resignation as United States Attorney effective November 21, 2020. He subsequently joined a private law firm, becoming a partner at Barnes & Thornburg.

Legal offices
Preceded by Joe Hogsett	United States Attorney for the Southern District of Indiana; 2014–2020	Succeeded by Josh Childress (acting)
