= Kyle Walker (politician) =

American politician

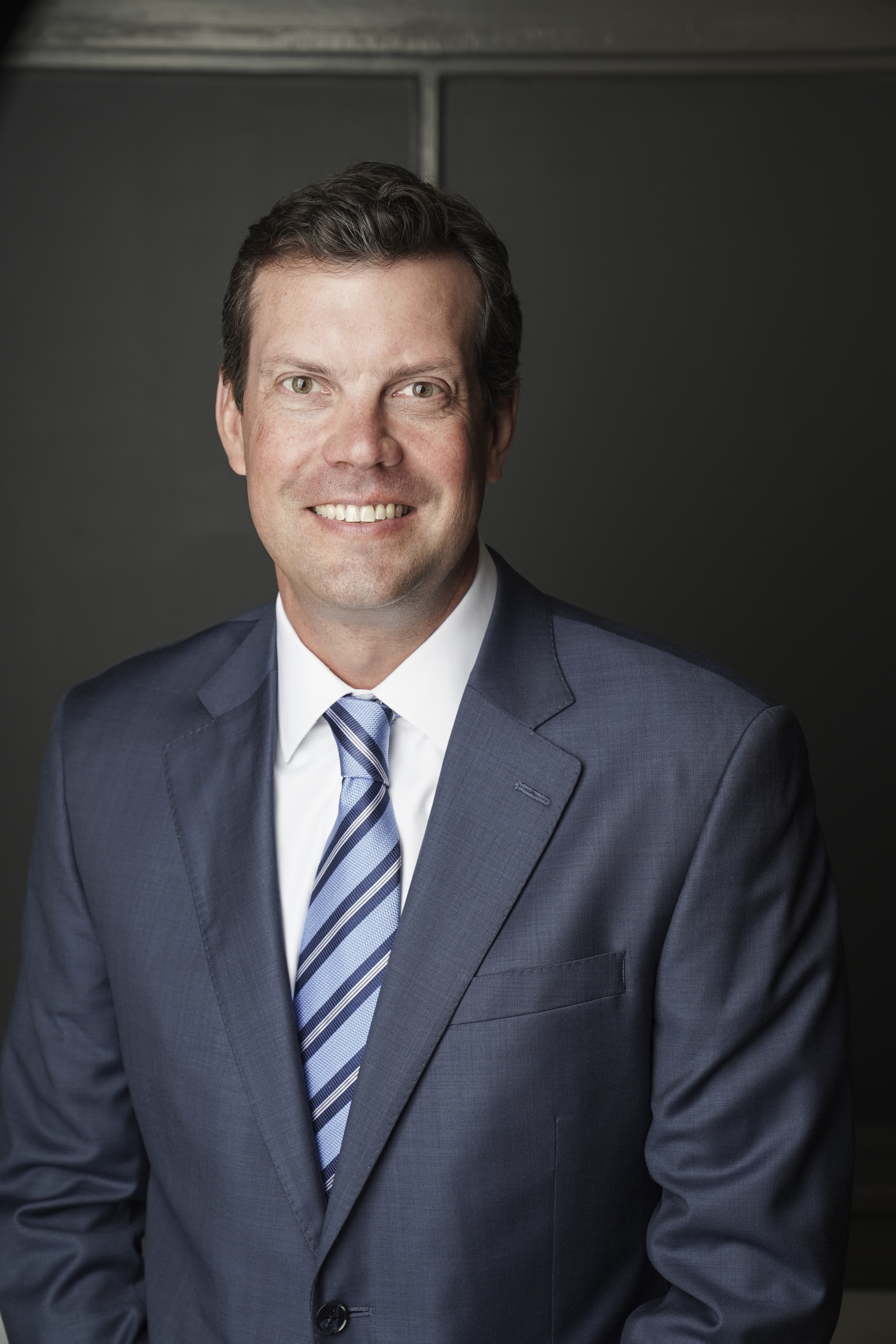

Member of the Indiana Senate from the 31st district
- In office November 17, 2020 – November 4, 2026
- Preceded by: Jim Merritt
- Succeeded by: Kerry Forestal

Personal details
- Party: Republican
- Spouse: Jennifer Hallowell
- Children: 2
- Education: Indiana Wesleyan University (BS)

Kyle Walker is an American politician serving as a member of the Indiana Senate for the 31st district. He assumed office on November 17, 2020.

== Early life and education ==
A native of Indianapolis, Walker graduated from Lawrence North High School and earned a Bachelor of Science degree in business management from Indiana Wesleyan University in 2005.

== Career ==
In 2007 and 2008, Walker worked as executive director of the Marion County Republican Central Committee. In 2008 and 2009, he served as deputy director of the Indianapolis Department of Public Works for policy and planning. He also worked as the business development manager of Commonwealth Engineers, an engineering consulting firm. He worked as chair of the Marion County Republican Central Committee from 2010 to 2015 and founded his own consulting company in 2010.

Walker was elected to the Indiana Senate by a caucus of Precinct Committee representatives to fill a vacancy in November 2020.

=== State Senate ===
During the 2021 legislative session, Walker sponsored legislation creating the Indiana Crime Guns Task Force to allow regional law enforcement agencies to work together to track guns used to commit crimes across Central Indiana. Since its creation, the Task Force has seized 369 illegal firearms leading to the arrests of 397 violent criminals.

During the 2022 legislative session, Walker supported a $1.1 billion income tax cut for Hoosiers. He authored several bills to improve public safety, including legislation to strengthen electronic monitoring of offenders so they can't go on to commit additional crimes. He also authored economic development legislation to help Indiana communities attract sports, tourism and convention events. Walker also led a bipartisan effort to help Indiana foster youth access and afford a driver's license and car insurance.

In his campaign for re-election, Walker has been endorsed by the Indiana Chamber of Commerce and the Indy Chamber BAC for his support of pro-business policies. Walker has also been endorsed by several state and local law enforcement and first responder organizations, including the Indiana State Fraternal Order of Police, the Indiana Fire Chiefs Association and the Indiana Professional Firefighters PAC as well as the Fishers Fraternal Order of Police Lodge 199 and the Lawrence Fraternal Order of Police Lodge 159. Walker has also received endorsements from labor unions including the Indiana AFL-CIO and the Indiana State Pipe Trades Association.

In March 2022, he voted against a bill that would repeal Indiana's requirement for a permit to carry a handgun in public places. In August 2022, Walker voted against a near total abortion ban in Indiana, after he expressed his opposition in July to a first trimester ban without reasonable exceptions for rape, incest, health of the mother and cases of fatal fetal anomaly.

During the 2023 legislative session, Walker authored a bill that extended the Foster Care Support Tax Credit to those who made donations to the Foster Youth Trust Fund. The bill also allows foster families to visit state parks at no cost, an idea proposed by a Girl Scout troop in Senate District 31. That same year, Walker authored a bill that directed the Statewide 911 Board to conduct a feasibility study on ways to improve Indiana's computer aided dispatch (CAD) systems and ensure that the closest first responders are reached during an emergency regardless of county lines.

Walker also led the effort to secure funding for the Sports and Tourism Bid Fund included in the biennial budget. The fund aids Indiana communities by providing additional resources to apply for and host major sports, tourism and convention events.

During the 2024 legislative session, Walker authored a bill that extended eligibility for Medicare supplement insurance for Indiana residents suffering from ALS or end stage renal disease and offers additional cost savings for these individuals, many of whom are in or are nearing end-of-life care.

Walker also sponsored a bill that brought back happy hours after a nearly 40-year ban. He claimed that the legislation would help restaurants attract more patrons and assist an industry that is still struggling with the losses of the global pandemic.
