= Jefferson Shreve =

American politician (born 1965)

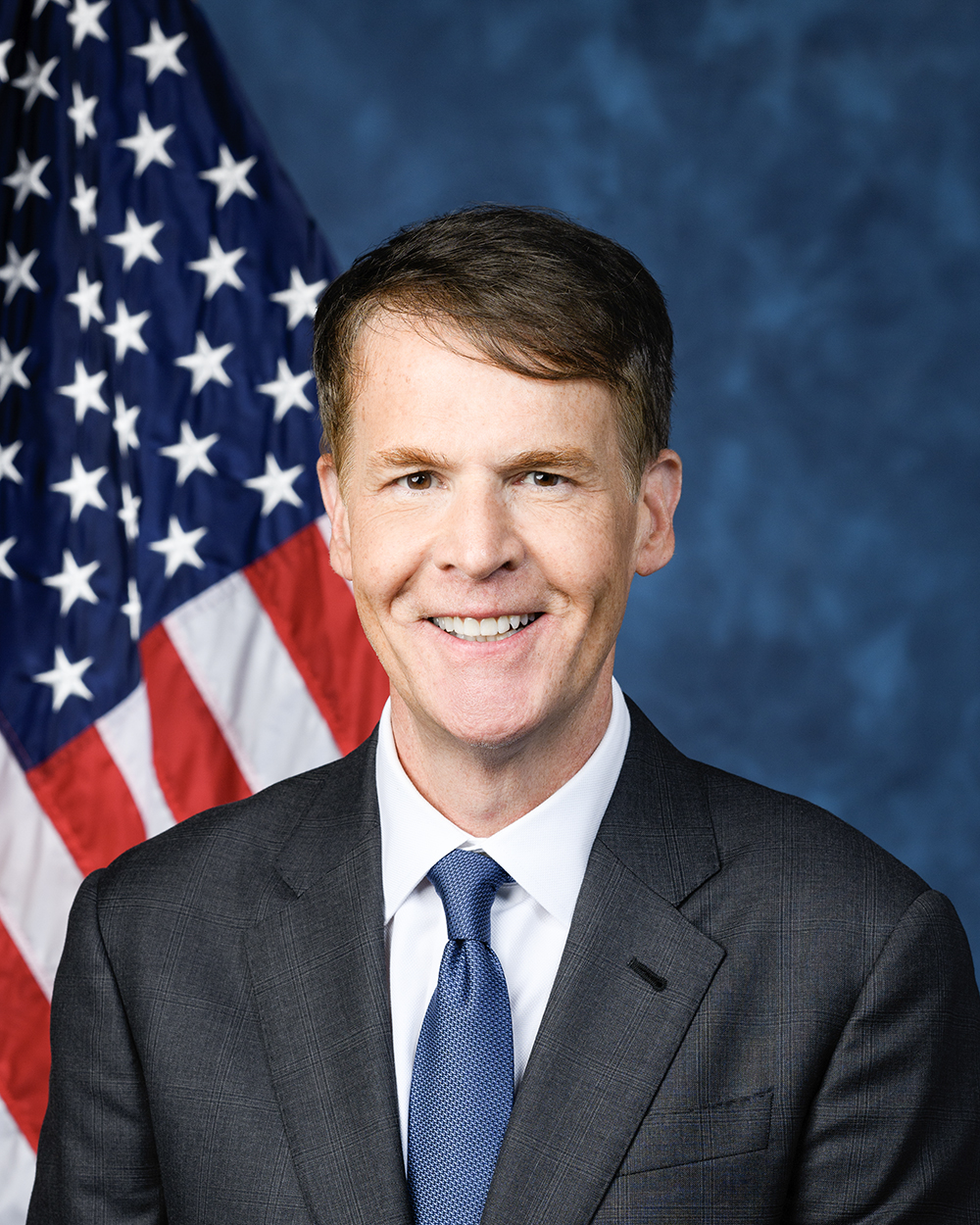
- Official portrait, 2025

Member of the U.S. House of Representatives from Indiana's 6th district
- Incumbent
- Assumed office January 3, 2025
- Preceded by: Greg Pence

Member of the Indianapolis City-County Council
- In office September 11, 2018 – January 1, 2020
- Preceded by: Jeff Miller
- Succeeded by: Kristin Jones
- Constituency: 16th district
- In office January 27, 2013 – January 1, 2016
- Preceded by: Jeff Cardwell
- Succeeded by: Scott Kreider
- Constituency: 23rd district

Personal details
- Born: Jefferson Scott Shreve; September 24, 1965 (age 61) Indianapolis, Indiana, U.S.
- Party: Republican
- Education: Indiana University, Bloomington (BA); University of London (MA); Purdue University, West Lafayette (MBA)
- Website: House website Campaign website

Jefferson Scott Shreve (born September 24, 1965) is an American politician and businessman who has served as the U.S. representative from Indiana's 6th congressional district since 2025. The district, which was once represented by former Vice President Mike Pence, covers a large swath of eastern and central Indiana, including much of the Indiana side of the Cincinnati area, as well as most of Indianapolis' southern suburbs and the southern fourth of Indianapolis itself.

A member of the Republican Party, he previously served on the Indianapolis City-County Council from 2018 to 2020 and from 2013 to 2016.

== Early life and business career ==
Shreve was born in Indianapolis on September 24, 1965, and raised in the University Heights neighborhood. He earned his Bachelor of Arts from Indiana University, Bloomington, a Master of Arts in international studies from the University of London, and his Master of Business Administration in agribusiness from the Krannert School of Management at Purdue University.

Shreve founded Storage Express, which he sold in 2022 to Extra Space Storage for $590 million. He also received a seat on the company's board of directors. His estimated net worth is $599.35 million.

== Early political career ==
Shreve was appointed to the Indianapolis City-County Council in 2013 after incumbent Jeff Cardwell resigned to serve in Governor Mike Pence's administration. He did not run for re-election in 2015 and left office in January 2016. He was appointed to the city council again in 2018 when incumbent Jeff Miller resigned after pleading guilty to four felonies. Like his first term, he did not run for re-election in 2019 and left office in January 2020.

Shreve ran for the Indiana Senate in the 36th district but lost the Republican primary to Jack Sandlin by 2.6%. He unsuccessfully ran for Indiana University trustee in 2018.

Shreve considers himself a moderate Republican.

== Campaign for Mayor of Indianapolis ==
Shreve ran for mayor of Indianapolis in 2023 and lost to incumbent Joe Hogsett by 31,097 votes. During his mayoral campaign, Shreve called for banning assault weapon sales, repealing permitless carry in Indiana, and raising the legal age to purchase a gun from 18 to 21. His stance led him to get an F rating from the NRA Political Victory Fund.

== U.S. House of Representatives ==
=== Elections ===
==== 2024 ====
Shreve announced he would run for Congress in Indiana's 6th congressional district in 2024 after incumbent U.S. Representative Greg Pence announced his retirement. The district had been pushed to the north and absorbed much of southern Indianapolis, including Shreve's home.

He won the primary in May 2024, defeating a field of Republican candidates that included Mike Speedy, Jeff Raatz, Bill Frazier, and John Jacob. He won the general election with 63.9% of the vote.

==== 2026 ====
Shreve is running for reelection in 2026. He narrowly defeated challenger Sarah Janisse Brown in the Republican primary, winning renomination with 53% of the vote. He won the general election against Democratic nominee Cinde Wirth with 55.1% of the vote.

=== Tenure ===
Shreve was sworn in as a member of Congress on January 3, 2025. He voted for Mike Johnson in the 2025 United States Speaker of the House election on January 3, 2025.

In January 2026, he voted against extending the Affordable Care Act enhanced tax credits.

=== Committee assignments ===
- Committee on Foreign Affairs
  - Subcommittee on South and Central Asia
  - Subcommittee on Western Hemisphere
- Committee on Transportation and Infrastructure
  - Subcommittee on Aviation
  - Subcommittee on Highways and Transit
  - Subcommittee on Railroads, Pipelines, and Hazardous Materials

=== Caucus memberships ===
- Main Street Caucus

== Personal life ==
Shreve is a Catholic.

== Electoral history ==
=== 2016 ===
Republican primary for Indiana State Senate District 36
| Party | Candidate | Votes | % |
|---|---|---|---|
| Republican | Jack Sandlin | 8,123 | 51.3% |
| Republican | Jefferson Shreve | 7,709 | 48.7% |
| Total votes | | 15,832 | 100.0% |

=== 2023 ===
Republican primary, Indianapolis mayor
| Party | Candidate | Votes | % |
|---|---|---|---|
| Republican | Jefferson Shreve | 19,152 | 65.9 |
| Republican | Abdul-Hakim Shabazz | 7,629 | 26.3 |
| Republican | James Jackson | 1,250 | 4.3 |
| Republican | John Couch | 1,036 | 3.6 |
| Total votes | | 29,067 | 100.0 |

2023 Indianapolis mayoral election
| Party | Candidate | Votes | % |
|---|---|---|---|
| Democratic | Joe Hogsett (incumbent) | 97,311 | 59.5 |
| Republican | Jefferson Shreve | 66,214 | 40.5 |
| Total votes | | 163,525 | 100.0 |
| Democratic hold | | | |

=== 2024 ===
Republican primary, Indiana's 6th Congressional District
| Party | Candidate | Votes | % |
|---|---|---|---|
| Republican | Jefferson Shreve | 20,265 | 28.4 |
| Republican | Mike Speedy | 15,752 | 22.1 |
| Republican | Jamison Carrier | 14,386 | 20.1 |
| Republican | Bill Frazier | 7,110 | 10.0 |
| Republican | Jeff Raatz | 6,365 | 8.9 |
| Republican | John Jacob | 5,793 | 8.1 |
| Republican | Darin Childress | 1,737 | 2.4 |
| Total votes | | 71,408 | 100.0 |

2024 Indiana's 6th congressional district election
| Party | Candidate | Votes | % |
|---|---|---|---|
| Republican | Jefferson Shreve | 200,494 | 63.9% |
| Democratic | Cynthia Wirth | 99,361 | 31.7% |
| Libertarian | James Sceniak | 13,665 | 4.4% |
| Total votes | | 313,520 | 100% |
| Republican hold | | | |

U.S. House of Representatives
| Preceded by Greg Pence | Member of the U.S. House of Representatives from Indiana's 6th congressional district 2025–present | Incumbent |
U.S. order of precedence (ceremonial)
| Preceded by Derek Schmidt | United States Representatives by seniority 416th | Succeeded by Lateefah Simon |
