= 2004 Indiana Attorney General election =

- November 2, 2004

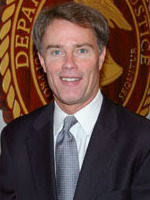
Candidate	Steve Carter	Joe Hogsett
Party	Republican	Democratic
Popular vote	1,389,640	953,500
Percentage	58.18%	39.92%
- Carter: 40–50% 50–60% 60–70% 70–80% Hogsett: 40–50% 50–60%
Attorney General before election
Steve Carter
Republican
Elected Attorney General
Steve Carter
Republican

The 2004 Indiana Attorney General election was held on November 2, 2004, to elect the Indiana Attorney General. Republican incumbent Steve Carter won election to a second term by a wide margin, defeating former Indiana Democratic Party Chair Joe Hogsett by eighteen percentage points.

== General election ==
=== Candidates ===
- Steve Carter, incumbent Indiana Attorney General (2001–2009) (Republican)
- Joe Hogsett, former Chair of the Indiana Democratic Party (2003–2004) and former Secretary of State of Indiana (1989–1994) (Democratic)
- Aaron T. Milewski (Libertarian)

=== Results ===
2004 Indiana Attorney General election results
Party	Candidate	Votes	%	±%
Republican	Steve Carter	1,389,640	58.18%	+6.90%
Democratic	Joe Hogsett	953,500	39.92%	−6.64%
Libertarian	Aaron T. Milewski	45,212	1.89%	−0.27%
Total votes		2,388,352	100.00%	
Republican hold				
