= Bill Crawford (Indiana politician) =

American politician

Member of the Indiana House of Representatives from the 98th district
- In office 1972–2012
- Succeeded by: Robin Shackleford

Personal details
- Born: January 28, 1936 Indianapolis, Indiana
- Died: September 25, 2015 (aged 79) Indianapolis, Indiana
- Party: Democratic
- Occupation: consultant

William A. Crawford (January 28, 1936 – September 25, 2015) was a Democratic member of the Indiana House of Representatives, representing the 98th District from 1972 to 2012. He was also the plaintiff in the 2008 Supreme Court case Crawford v. Marion County Election Board. He has an award named after him called the William “Bill” Crawford Legacy Award, dedicated to individuals who demonstrate excellence but have yet to be recognized for their achievements.
