= Richard Hite =

Richard A.J. Hite
- Born: Gary, Indiana
- Other name: Rick
- Police career
- Country: Baltimore Police Department; Indianapolis Metropolitan Police Department
- Service years: 31 (BPD); 2 (Indianapolis)
- Rank: Lieutenant Colonel (BPD); Chief of Police (IMPD)
- Website: Indiana Civil Rights Commission

Richard A.J. "Rick" Hite is executive director of the Indiana Civil Rights Commission. Previously he served as chief of the Indianapolis Metropolitan Police Department, and a retired Lieutenant Colonel of the Baltimore Police Department. An African American, Hite was president of the BPD's Vanguard Justice Society, an organization representing the department's African American officers and was the commander of the BPD's Youth Services Division, a division of the department with responsibilities concerning troubled inner city youths. Hite retired from the Baltimore force on June 30, 2009. He served as deputy public safety director in Indianapolis, Indiana from 2010 to 2012, when he was appointed interim police chief after former chief Paul Ciesielski stepped down. Hite was named chief on a permanent basis on December 6, 2012.

Hite was the person who notified then-Baltimore mayor William Donald Schaefer of the Baltimore Colts' move to Indianapolis during the early hours of March 29, 1984. At the time, Hite was a member of Schaefer's protective detail.
