= Randy Head =

American politician

Chair of the Indiana Republican Party
- In office June 24, 2024 – December 2, 2024
- Preceded by: Anne Hathaway
- Succeeded by: Erin Lucas (acting)

Member of the Indiana Senate from the 18th district
- In office November 5, 2008 – August 12, 2019
- Preceded by: Thomas Weatherwax
- Succeeded by: Stacey Donato

Personal details
- Born: Randall Head; November 18, 1968 (age 57) Indianapolis, Indiana, U.S.
- Party: Republican
- Spouse: Lisa
- Education: Wabash College (BA); Indiana University Bloomington (JD)

Randall "Randy" Head (born November 18, 1968) was a Republican member of the Indiana Senate, representing the 18th District since 2008. He used to be Deputy Prosecutor for Cass County. He resigned from the State Senate on August 12, 2019, to become Chief Deputy Prosecutor of Pulaski County. He was replaced by Stacey Donato. In 2024, Head was elected as the new chair of the Indiana Republican Party. However, five months later he resigned from the position.

Party political offices
Preceded by Anne Hathaway	Chair of the Indiana Republican Party; 2024	Succeeded by Erin Lucas; Acting
