= Jim Merritt (American politician) =

American politician

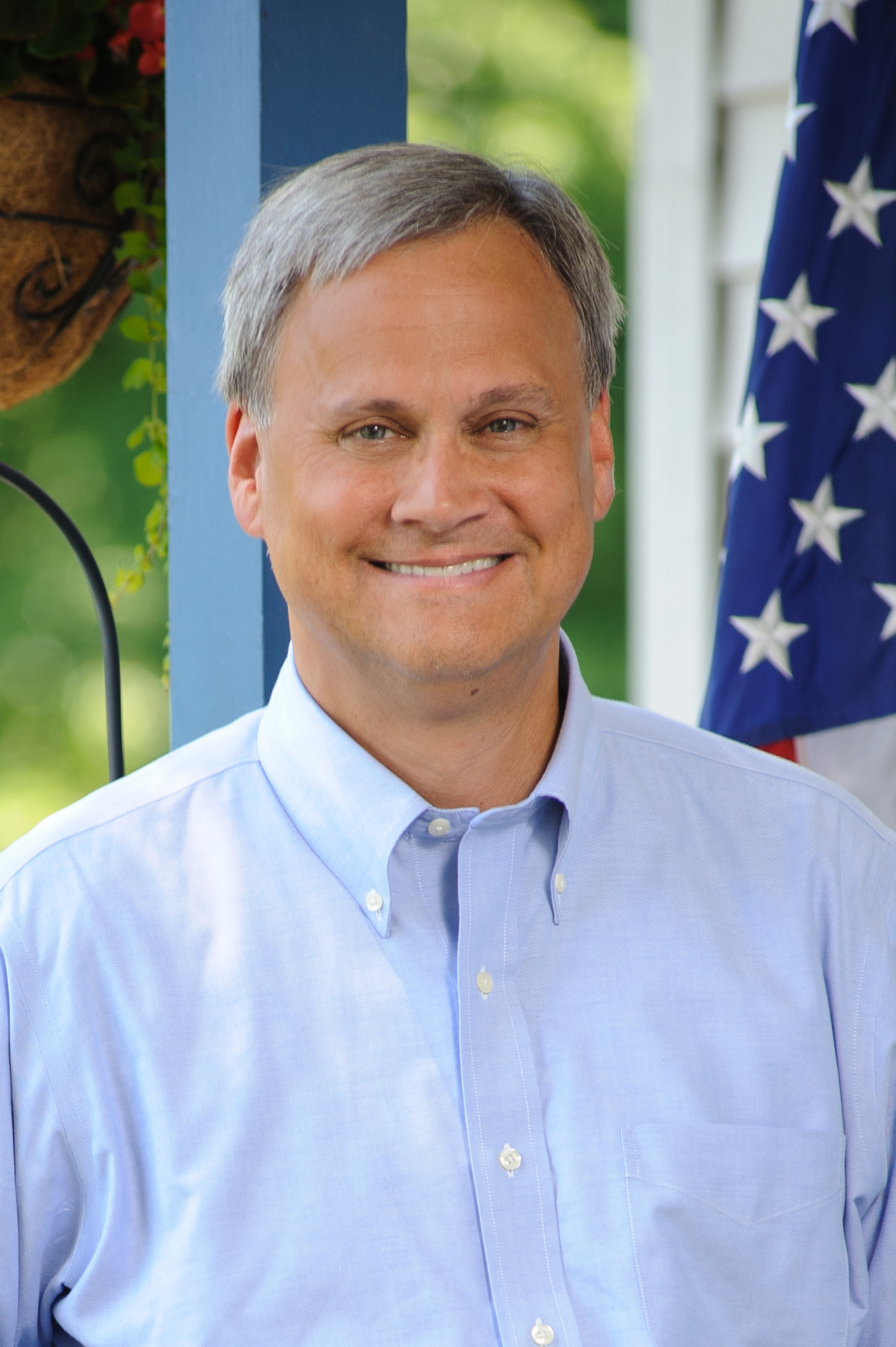

Member of the Indiana Senate from the 31st district
- In office November 7, 1990 – November 4, 2020
- Preceded by: William Vobach
- Succeeded by: Kyle Walker

Personal details
- Born: July 28, 1959 (age 66) Indianapolis, Indiana, U.S.
- Party: Republican
- Education: Indiana University Bloomington (BA)

James W. Merritt Jr. (born July 28, 1959) is an American politician and former Republican member of the Indiana Senate from 1991 to 2020, representing the 31st District. He was first elected to the Indiana Senate in 1990. He was reelected to the state Senate in the 2010 election, defeating then-Marion County Sheriff Frank J. Anderson by a margin of 52% to 44%.

== Biography ==
Merritt received his Bachelor of Arts in political science from Indiana University in 1981. Professionally, Merritt is vice president of corporate affairs for the Indiana Railroad Company. He previously served as district assistant to representative Elwood Hillis. He is divorced and has two daughters and one son.

Merritt was elected chair of the Marion County Republican Party in March 2017. He replaced Mike McQuillen. He resigned as County Party Chair in December 2018. Bryce Carpenter took over as interim county GOP chair.

On January 10, 2019, Merritt announced that he was running for Mayor of Indianapolis in 2019. He won the primary on May 7, 2019. Merritt was soundly defeated by the incumbent Joe Hogsett.

In September 2020, Merritt announced that he would be retiring from the State Senate on November 4.

== Committees ==
In the 2014 session, Merritt chaired the Utilities Committee. His was a majority member of these committees: Homeland Security, Transportation and Veterans Affairs; Joint Rules; Public Policy; Rules and Legislative Procedure; and also the Transportation sub-committee.
