= Joe Hogsett =

Mayor of Indianapolis since 2016

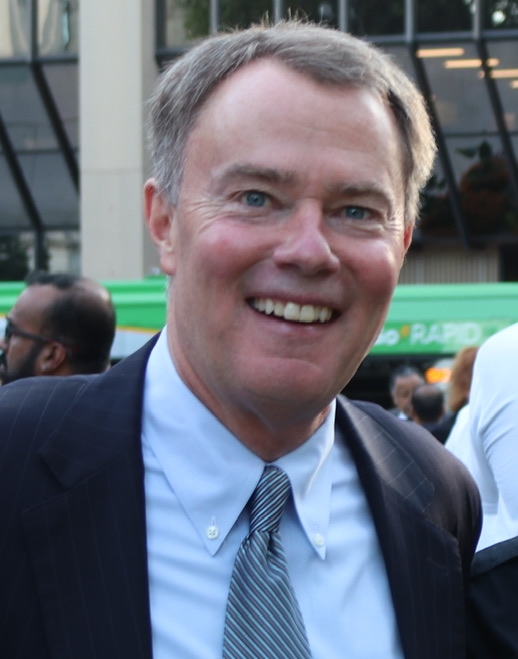
- Hogsett in 2019

49th Mayor of Indianapolis
- Incumbent
- Assumed office January 1, 2016
- Preceded by: Greg Ballard

United States Attorney for the Southern District of Indiana
- In office September 30, 2010 – July 31, 2014
- President: Barack Obama
- Preceded by: Timothy M. Morris
- Succeeded by: Joshua Minkler

Chair of the Indiana Democratic Party
- In office February 20, 2003 – June 21, 2004
- Preceded by: Peter Manous
- Succeeded by: Kipper Tew

57th Secretary of State of Indiana
- In office January 9, 1989 – December 1, 1994
- Governor: Evan Bayh
- Preceded by: Evan Bayh
- Succeeded by: Sue Anne Gilroy

Personal details
- Born: Joseph Hadden Hogsett; November 2, 1956 (age 70) Rushville, Indiana, U.S.
- Party: Democratic
- Spouse: Stephanie Hogsett (sep. 2023)
- Education: Indiana University Bloomington (BA, JD); Christian Theological Seminary (MTS)
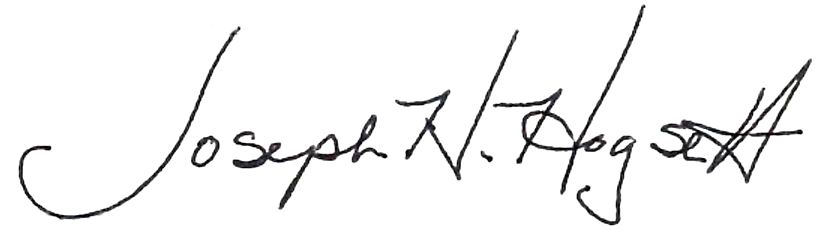
- Signature

Joseph Hadden Hogsett (born November 2, 1956) is an American attorney, prosecutor, and politician who is the 49th mayor of Indianapolis, Indiana. Prior to being elected mayor, Hogsett served as the secretary of state of Indiana from 1989 to 1994 and as the chairman of the Indiana Democratic Party from 2003 to 2004. He was the Democratic Party's nominee for the U.S. Senate in 1992, for Indiana's 2nd congressional district in 1994 and for attorney general of Indiana in 2004. He served as the United States attorney for the Southern District of Indiana from 2010 to 2014. He was elected mayor of Indianapolis in the 2015 election. He won reelection to a second term in 2019 and third term in 2023.

== Early life and education ==
Hogsett was born in Rushville, Indiana, in 1956. He graduated from Indiana University Bloomington with a Bachelor of Arts degree. He received a Master of Theological Studies degree from Christian Theological Seminary in Indianapolis and a Juris Doctor from Indiana University School of Law – Bloomington (now Indiana University Maurer School of Law). He went on to serve as a clerk for the Monroe County Superior Court and many civic and charitable positions.

== Indiana secretary of state ==
In 1986 Hogsett served as campaign manager for Evan Bayh's successful bid for secretary of state of Indiana. Bayh tapped Hogsett to serve in the position of deputy secretary of state. Hogsett then managed Bayh's successful campaign for Governor of Indiana two years later and was appointed by Bayh to the office of secretary of state that Bayh had vacated. Hogsett won election against Indianapolis mayor Bill Hudnut in 1990. Hogsett received 775,163 votes (51.83%) and Hudnut received 719,314 votes (48.10%). Hogsett served as Secretary of State until December 1, 1994, when he declined to run for re-election. As of 2025 he is the most recent Democrat to occupy the office of Indiana Secretary of State.

=== Congressional and Senate elections ===
In 1992, Hogsett ran for the U.S. Senate against Republican incumbent Dan Coats. Coats, who had been appointed to the seat by Governor Robert D. Orr in 1989 after Dan Quayle resigned to become Vice President of the United States, had won a special election in 1990 to serve out the remainder of Quayle's term and was seeking a full 6-year term in office. Hogsett lost to Coats by 900,148 votes (40.8%) to 1,267,972 (57.3%), carrying 13 of the state's 92 counties

In 1994, Hogsett ran to succeed retiring Democratic Congressman Philip Sharp of Indiana's 2nd congressional district. He faced Republican David M. McIntosh and lost by 78,241 votes (45.5%) to 93,592 (54.5%), in a year when the Republicans made sweeping gains.

Despite having been recruited by state Democratic Party leaders, Hogsett declined to run in the 2000 2nd congressional district election.

=== Democratic Party Chairman and Attorney General election ===
In February 2003, Hogsett became Chairman of the Indiana Democratic Party after incumbent Chairman, Peter Manous, resigned. Hogsett then resigned in June 2004 so that he could run for Attorney General of Indiana. He was replaced by Kip Tew to be party Chairman.

Hogsett lost to Republican incumbent Steve Carter. Carter received 1,389,640 votes (58.18%), Hogsett received 953,500 votes (39.92%) and Libertarian Aaron Milewski received 45,212 votes (1.89%).

== United States attorney ==
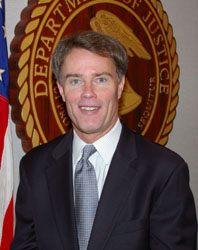
Hogsett's official portrait as U.S. Attorney, 2010

In July 2010, President Barack Obama nominated Hogsett to be United States attorney for the Southern District of Indiana, succeeding Timothy M. Morris. He went on to be unanimously confirmed by a full vote of the US Senate.

Hogsett's tenure was marked by an aggressive approach in combating violent crime, public corruption, child exploitation and civil rights violations. Local commentators have described Hogsett's efforts as bringing "more muscle to crimefighting," and he has launched a number of initiatives related to these priorities.

=== Violent Crime Initiative ===
In March 2011, Hogsett announced the creation of a Violent Crime Initiative, saying at the time that "for too many young people, it is easier to get a gun than an education. That is unacceptable."

Hogsett said that the "VCI," as it has come to be known, would have four priorities: (1) Prosecute more gun crimes than ever before and increase efforts to identify and vigorously prosecute in federal court violent repeat offenders and criminal gangs, especially those who use guns to further their illegal activities and criminal enterprises. (2) Increase the use of law enforcement and prosecution tools such as court-authorized wiretaps, undercover and covert operations, surveillance, search warrants and use of the grand jury to develop the best possible cases. (3) Actively utilize federal drug laws and federal gun laws for the "worst of the worst" to allow for pretrial detention and stiffer sentences. (4) Aggressively employ a multi-agency law enforcement approach to investigate, arrest and aid prosecution of violent repeat offenders and gangs.

According to published reports, Hogsett's Violent Crime Initiative has produced "dramatic" results, including a significant increase in the number of prosecutions filed by his office against individuals illegally possessing guns. In 2010—prior to Hogsett's tenure—there were just 14 illegally armed felons charged by the U.S. Attorney's Office. In 2011, that number jumped to more than 110 individuals, and in 2012, there were more than 160 firearms-related charges filed as part of the Violent Crime Initiative.

=== Public Integrity Working Group ===
In April 2012, Hogsett announced the creation of a first-of-its-kind Public Integrity Working Group targeting public corruption and white collar crime in Indiana. The announcement claimed the Working Group was "historic, in terms of both the number of law enforcement agencies involved and as to the singular focus on such an important issue – the integrity of our public offices and officeholders."

Hogsett's office set up a Public Corruption Hotline to assist the Working Group, which was reportedly modeled after efforts to combat corruption in northwestern Indiana. He has also responded to critics wary of partisan prosecutions by citing his recent prosecution of two Indianapolis city councilmen: one a Republican convicted of taking bribes to grease the wheels for a new strip club; the other a Democrat charged with swindling more than $1 million from an investor.

=== Indictment against Imperial Petroleum ===
On September 19, 2013, Jeffrey T. Wilson, Craig Ducey, Chad Ducey, Brian Carmichael, Joseph Furando, Evelyn Pattison, Caravan Trading LLC, Cima Green LLC, CIMA Energy Group and Imperial Petroleum were indicted in what Joe Hogsett referred to as "the largest instance of tax and securities fraud in state history" (in Indiana). Per the Energy Independence and Security Act of 2007, a tax subsidy was offered to the first person or organization to mix pure biodiesel (B100) with petroleum diesel. The individuals are accused of fraudulently selling over 130 Megaliters of RIN-stripped B99 to clients who paid an artificially augmented dollar amount while believing that they were acquiring B100 with RINs and a tax subsidy.

=== Resignation ===
On July 14, 2014, Hogsett announced that he was resigning his position as United States attorney, effective July 31, 2014.

== Mayoralty ==
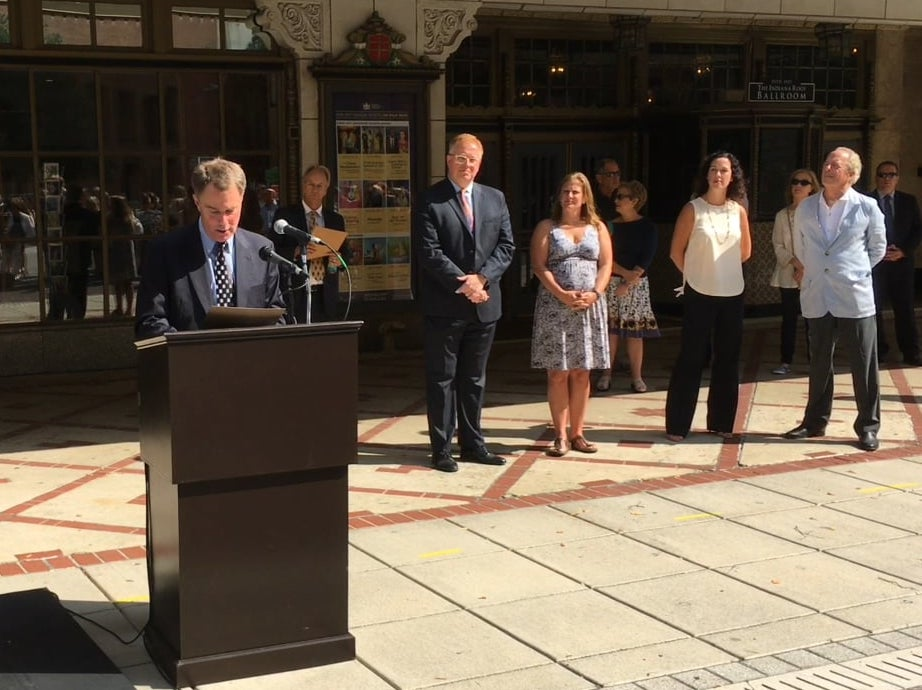
Mayor Joe Hogsett Introduces Don Gummer, an artist who created 8 sculptures

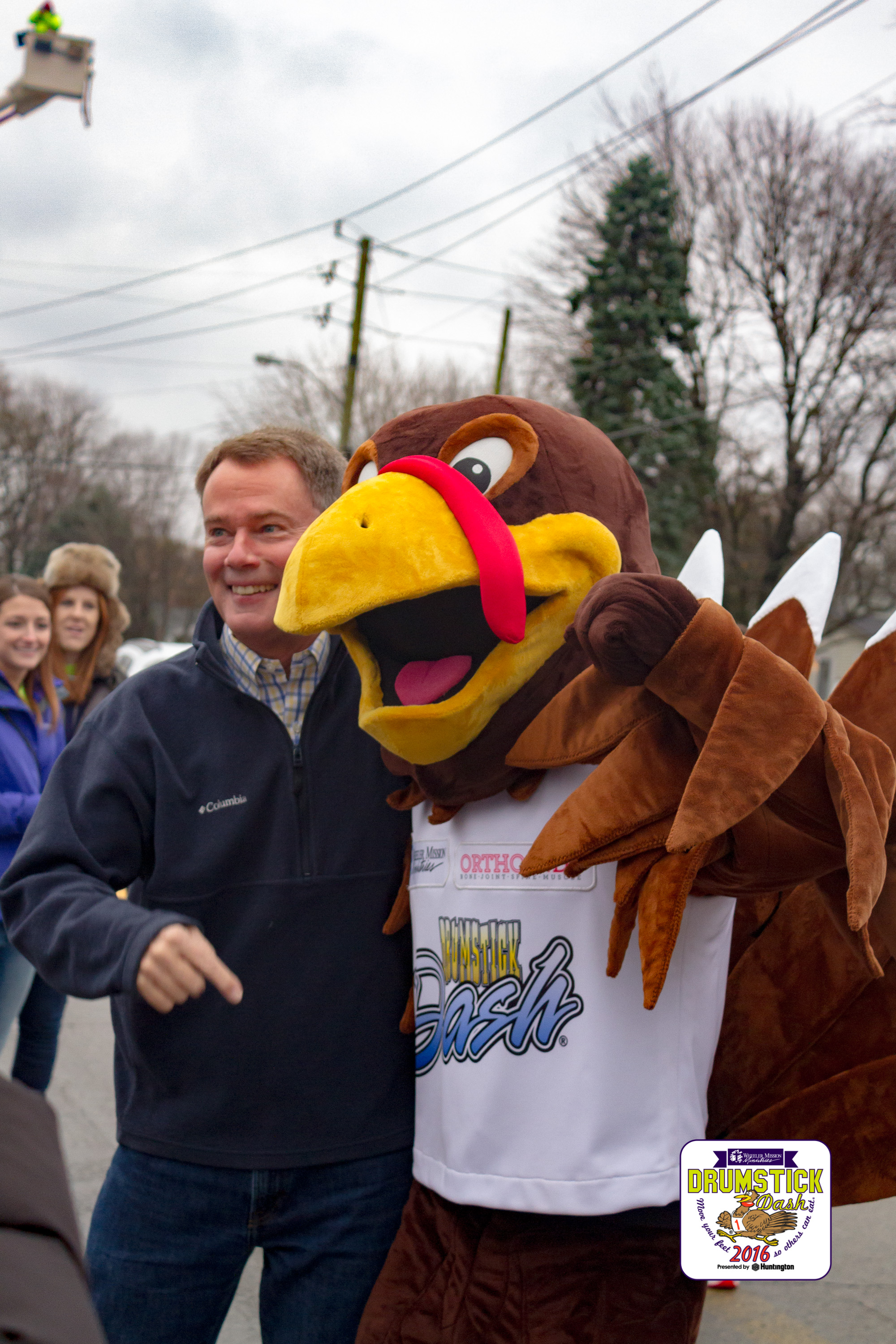
Hogsett with Gerry Gobbler at the 2016 Drumstick Dash

On August 15, 2012, the Indianapolis Star published a piece entitled, "Is U.S. Attorney Joe Hogsett eyeing a run at Indianapolis mayor?" The profile noted that Hogsett's visibility and successes as U.S. Attorney had fueled speculation of a return to politics in Indiana, citing both the 2015 mayoral election in Indianapolis and the 2016 U.S. Senate race as possibilities. Hogsett received especially strong praise from former U.S. Senator Evan Bayh, who described Hogsett as "a wonderful representative for the Democratic Party and the people of Indiana."

In December 2012, the Indianapolis Business Journal named Hogsett a 2012 Newsmaker in a piece entitled, "Crime stance returns Hogsett to political spotlight."

In July 2014, four years after his nomination as U.S. Attorney, Hogsett announced he would leave the office at the end of the month. The decision was widely interpreted to mean that Hogsett would consider a run against Republican Indianapolis Mayor Greg Ballard. Media reports indicated that Hogsett's decision may have been motivated by the record-breaking violent crime spree affecting the city.

In the days that followed his resignation announcement, a social media campaign was launched urging Hogsett to run for mayor in 2015. In August 2014, he formed an exploratory committee.

On November 5, Mayor Ballard announced that he would not run for re-election to a third term in office. Seven days later, Hogsett announced his candidacy. He handily defeated Republican nominee Chuck Brewer with 63 percent of the vote, giving the Democrats complete control of city government for only the second time since the formation of Unigov in 1970.

Hogsett would go on to win reelection in 2019 for a 2nd term against Republican challenger Jim Merritt.

In 2023, Hogsett's administration passed a set of largely unenforceable (under an existing state preemption law) gun control measures, known as Proposal 156, through the city-county council, which included an assault weapons ban. In November 2022, Hogsett announced he would seek a third and final term as mayor, later winning his party nomination for the office for the 2023 election. He defeated Jefferson Shreve.

=== Sexual harassment allegations within administration ===
In July 2024, the Indianapolis Star released an investigative report of Hogsett's administration, specifically on former chief deputy mayor, Thomas Cook. The report outlined three women that said Cook targeted younger women who worked under him, giving them praise, poetry and gifts and promised career growth as he pressured them toward intimacy and unwanted sexual encounters. According to the report, Hogsett heard complaints about Cook and his behavior in 2017. Hogsett's administration said it reprimanded and disciplined Cook three times, finally resulting in his resignation from city employment in 2020. However, he was hired for Hogsett's 2023 mayoral campaign and then later ultimately fired.

Subsequently, the Indianapolis City-County Council formed a special committee to investigate allegations of impropriety against the mayor's office concerning how it responded to Cook's actions. Following the conclusion of an investigation that found Hogsett and his administration did not break the law, an attorney representing several of the alleged victims revealed that the special committee investigation omitted information regarding Hogsett's personal behavior.

After resigning from politics publicly, Cook continued to leverage his political connections with Hogsett in order to secure $80 million dollars in public incentives to benefit his law firm's clients.

In September 2024, an administrator was fired for violating the city's workplace harassment policy.

Five City-County councilors: Josh Bain, Jesse Brown, Crista Carlino, Michael-Paul Hart and Andy Nielson, have called for Hogsett to resign in response to the initial report and resulting investigations. The scandal divided Indianapolis-era Democrats, with some calling for a change in leadership.

=== Staff turnover ===
Hogsett has faced significant senior staff turnover because of the controversies surrounding him. This turnover involved the departure of the Mayor's most senior advisors, including successive chiefs of staff and the city controller. This exodus extended into the agencies responsible for the city's physical and economic development, most notably the Department of Metropolitan Development (DMD) and the Department of Public Works (DPW). Furthermore, public testimony from former mid-level directors, including those in sustainability and human resources, characterized the internal environment as increasingly difficult, citing a lack of administrative support for professionalizing city operations.

== Personal life ==
Hogsett lives in Indianapolis since becoming mayor. Hogsett married Stephanie Connolly in 2010, his third wife. He has two children, named William and Eden, one each with former wives. In September 2023, Connolly filed for divorce.

== Electoral history ==
Indiana Secretary of State, 1990
Party	Candidate	Votes	%
Democratic	Joe Hogsett	775,163	51.83%
Republican	William H. Hudnut III	719,314	48.10%
No party	Write-Ins	971	0.06%

U.S. Senator from Indiana (Class 3), 1992
Party	Candidate	Votes	%
Republican	Dan Coats	1,267,972	57.3%
Democratic	Joe Hogsett	900,148	40.8%
Libertarian	Steve Dillon	35,733	1.6%
New Alliance	Raymond Tirado	7,474	0.3%
No party	Write-Ins	99	0.0%

U.S. Congress for Indiana's 2nd district, 1994
Party	Candidate	Votes	%
Republican	David M. McIntosh	93,592	54.5%
Democratic	Joe Hogsett	78,241	45.5%

Indiana Attorney General, 2004
Party	Candidate	Votes	%
Republican	Steve Carter	1,389,640	58.18%
Democratic	Joe Hogsett	953,500	39.92%
Libertarian	Aaron Milewski	45,212	1.89%

Indianapolis mayoral election, 2015
Party	Candidate	Votes	%
Democratic	Joe Hogsett	92,834	62.0%
Republican	Chuck Brewer	56,662	37.9%
No party	Write-Ins	221	0.1%

Indianapolis mayoral election, 2019
Party	Candidate	Votes	%
Democratic	Joe Hogsett	108,319	71.5%
Republican	Jim Merritt	40,637	26.8%
Libertarian	Douglas John "Mac" McNaughton	2,337	1.5%
No party	Write-Ins	197	0.1%

Indianapolis mayoral election, 2023
Party	Candidate	Votes	%
Democratic	Joe Hogsett	97,311	59.5%
Republican	Jefferson Shreve	66,214	40.5%

== See also ==
- United States vs. Imperial Petroleum
- List of mayors of the 50 largest cities in the United States

Political offices
Preceded by Evan Bayh	Secretary of State of Indiana; 1989–1994	Succeeded by Sue Anne Gilroy
Preceded by Greg Ballard	Mayor of Indianapolis; 2016–present	Incumbent
Party political offices
Preceded by Evan Bayh	Democratic nominee for Secretary of State of Indiana; 1990	Succeeded by Tim Jeffers
Preceded by Baron Hill	Democratic nominee for U.S. Senator from Indiana (Class 3); 1992	Succeeded by Evan Bayh
Preceded by Peter Manous	Chair of the Indiana Democratic Party; 2003–2004	Succeeded by Kipper Tew
Preceded by Karen Freeman-Wilson	Democratic nominee for Attorney General of Indiana; 2004	Succeeded by Lorenzo Arredondo
Legal offices
Preceded by Susan Brooks	United States Attorney for the Southern District of Indiana; 2010–2014	Succeeded by Joshua Minkler
