= Indiana Republican Party =

Indiana affiliate of the Republican Party

Republican Party of Indiana
- Chairperson: Jim Johnson (Interim)
- Governor of Indiana: Mike Braun
- Senate Leader: Lt. Gov. Micah Beckwith
- House Leader: Speaker Ben Smaltz
- Merger of: People's Party
- Headquarters: 101 W. Ohio Street; Indianapolis, Indiana 46204
- Student wing: Indiana Federation of College Republicans Indiana Federation of Young Republicans
- Ideology: Conservatism; Right-wing populism Right-libertarianism
- Colors: Gold, blue
- United States Senate delegation: 2 / 2
- United States House of Representatives delegation: 7 / 9
- Executive Offices: 7 / 7
- Indiana State Senate: 40 / 50
- Indiana House of Representatives: 69 / 100

Election symbol

Website
- www.indiana.gop

The Indiana Republican Party, currently chaired by interim chairman Jim Johnson, is the United States Republican Party's affiliate in Indiana and serves as the state affiliate of the national GOP. The party platform emphasizes limited government, fiscal conservatism, traditional family structures, and opposition to abortion.

The party has been the predominant political party in Indiana politics for most of the state's history. It controls all statewide executive offices, both U.S. Senate seats, and seven of Indiana's nine U.S. House seats. It held supermajorities in both chambers of the state legislature for 14 years until the 2026 election.

Historically, Indiana has also been a reliably Republican state in presidential elections, deviating only during major national Democratic landslides.

From the late 20th century onward, Indiana consistently supported Republican presidential candidates, except for Barack Obama's narrow 2008 win. Since 2005, the state has continuously elected Republican governors.

== History ==
Republicans have been the leading political party in Indiana for most of its history. However, Democrats occasionally performed well in state government elections from the 1960s to the early 2000s.

In presidential elections, the state is also reliably Republican; Indiana voters opted for the Democratic Party only five times since 1892, with all of those victories occurring amid national Democratic landslides. In fact, no Republican has won the presidency without carrying Indiana since 1876, when Democrat Samuel Tilden very narrowly carried the state amid an extremely close (and still disputed) national election.

In the election of 1860, Abraham Lincoln won all of Indiana's 13 electoral votes with 51.09% of the popular vote. When the American Civil War broke out, Indiana had a strong, pro-South Democratic Party in the Indiana General Assembly that, for the most part, claimed to be pro-Union but anti-abolition. Governor Oliver P. Morton (elected 1861) had a close relationship with Lincoln, who called him the "shrewdest person I know". At the 1862 Loyal War Governors Conference in Altoona, Pennsylvania, Morton put his full support behind Lincoln's Emancipation Proclamation.

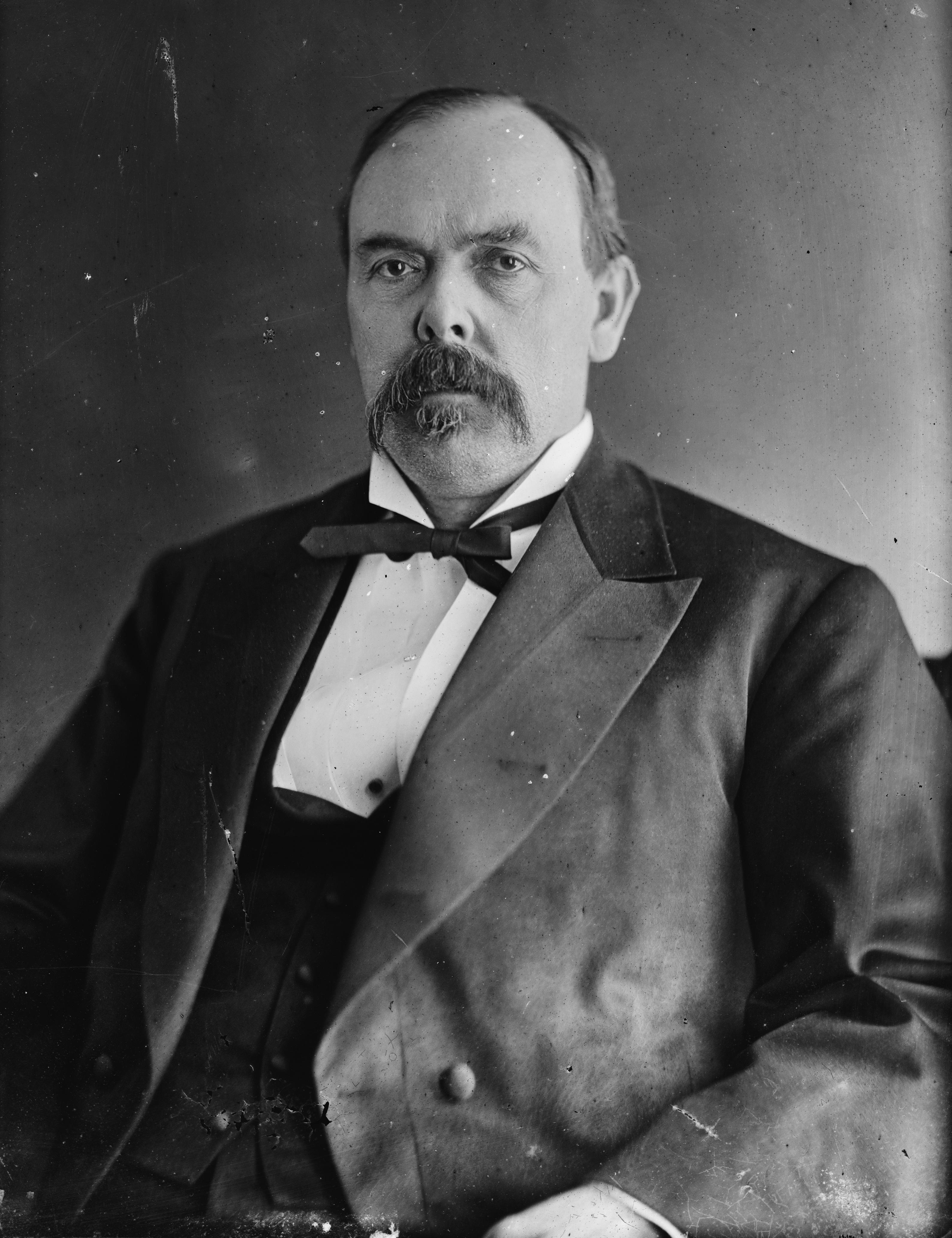
Governor Oliver P. Morton

A backlash followed the issuance of the Emancipation Proclamation, leading to a defeat of Republicans in the 1862 midterm elections. Morton feared that the Democratic majority in the General Assembly would be sympathetic to the Confederacy, so he began to take steps to circumvent the General Assembly and mobilize Indiana in the war effort. When Morton stepped beyond the scope of his constitutional powers by establishing a state arsenal, the Democratic legislature moved to switch command of the militia from the governor to the General Assembly. Fearing that, with control of the militia, the Democrats would attempt to secede from the Union, Morton helped Republican legislators flee to Kentucky to prevent a quorum. Unable to pass appropriations bills, the paralyzed government of Indiana teetered on the brink of bankruptcy until Morton once again stepped outside the scope of his powers and acquired millions of dollars in federal and private loans to keep the government running, support Indiana's role in the war effort, and circumvent the Democratic Assembly.

For the remainder of the Civil War, Morton worked to keep Indiana secure by suppressing elements he viewed as anti-Union or sympathetic to the South. The searches, arrests, and even disruption of the Democratic State Convention in what would later be called the Battle of Pogue's Run earned Morton much criticism, and he was called a "dictator" and an "underhanded mobster". As the war ended and the Republican Party received an overwhelming majority in the government, Morton's questionable conduct during the war became moot, and he continued to serve a second term in the U.S. Senate until 1877.

The party's darkest stain was after World War I, following a rush of immigrants from eastern and southern Europe into the United States. By this time, the Indiana Republican Party, like the Republican Party elsewhere, had given up its former goal of African-American rights. Unlike the first Ku Klux Klan that rose in the South during the Reconstruction era to terrorize both white and black Republicans, the new Klan that started in Georgia in 1915 was a highly nativist organization. Staunchly anti-immigrant, anti-Catholic, antisemitic, and prejudiced against African Americans, the new Klan spread into Indiana in the 1920s under Grand Dragon D.C. Stephenson. The second KKK was almost exclusively Republican in Midwestern states such as Indiana as well as in northern and western states such as Maine and Colorado. However, the KKK remained exclusively Democratic in the South. Under Stephenson's leadership, the Klan flourished in Indiana and took over both the governor's office and much of the Republican Party in the General Assembly. With over 250,000 white males (approximately forty percent of Indiana's population) paying Klan dues in Indiana, Stephenson amassed a fortune estimated at between two and five million dollars. In 1922, the Klan-dominated General Assembly passed a bill establishing a Klan Day at the Indiana State Fair. Still, Republican Governor Warren T. McCray vetoed the bill, earning the ire of Stephenson and the Klan.

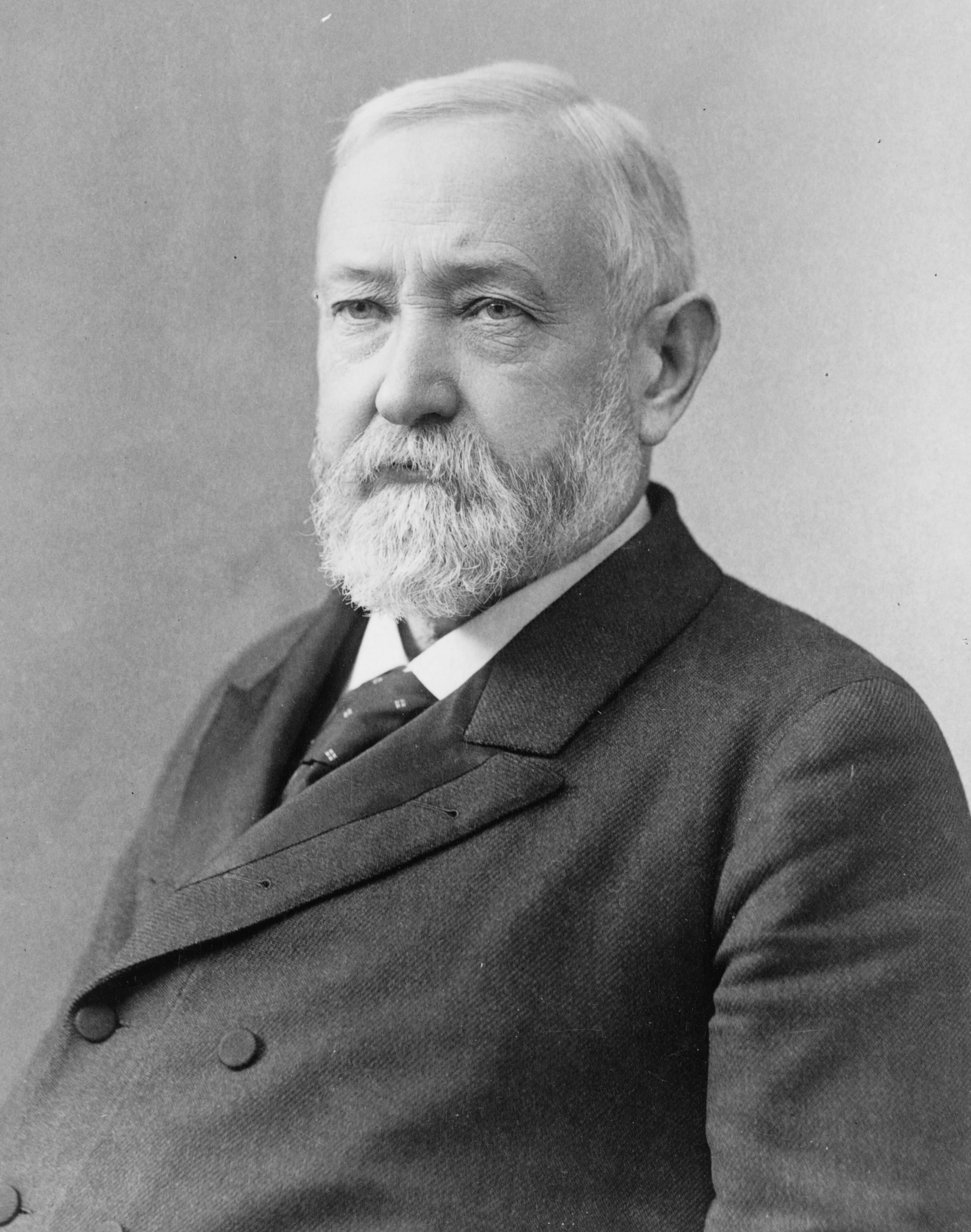
President Benjamin Harrison (1889–1893)

In the 1924 Republican primary elections in Indiana, almost all candidates nominated for statewide office were Klansmen. One African-American newspaper said, "The Ku Klux Klan has captured boot and breeches, the Republican party in Indiana and have [sic] turned what has been historically an organization of constitutional freedom into an agency for the promotion of religious and racial hate. Nobody now denies the Ku Klux Klan is the dominating power in Indiana Republican politics. In fact, the Republican party exists in Indiana today only in name. Its place has been usurped by the Klan purposes and leadership and issues." Most Indiana blacks in 1924 cast their first-ever ballot for the Democratic Party, which had passed a resolution denouncing the KKK in its platform, though without mentioning the Klan by name. Black voters in other areas of the United States, in contrast, generally remained Republican until the 1930s. Despite the influx of Black voters into the Democratic Party, Klansmen won most seats in the Indiana legislature and most statewide offices in the November 1924 general elections. However, once in office, the Klan-controlled legislature passed little to no anti-black, anti-Jewish, or anti-Catholic legislation.

The peak of the Klan's power and influence was in the early 1920s, when the Klan had Governor McCray arrested, imprisoned, and thrown out of office on a charge of mail fraud. Republican Edward Jackson, a KKK member, was elected in the 1924 election. Stephenson became infamous for his words, "I am the law in Indiana."

The Klan quickly fell apart under the revelation that Stephenson had abducted, raped, and murdered a young woman. Because the Klan was more of a populist organization that believed in its image of defending the race and "Protestant Womanhood," its power and influence in both Indiana and its politics dissolved quickly. Governor Jackson refused to pardon his old ally Stephenson, so Stephenson retaliated from prison by revealing evidence that Jackson had received bribes from the Klan. Despite calls for Jackson's resignation for being associated with the Klan, his trial resulted in a hung jury.

From 1972 to 1988, the Republican Party's candidate for president won over 50% of Indiana's popular vote, breaking only in 1992 when independent candidate Ross Perot siphoned votes away from both Democrat Bill Clinton and Republican George H. W. Bush, and again in 1996 against Clinton and Bob Dole. Perot won 19.77% of the vote in 1992 and 10.56% in 1996. Clinton lost Indiana in 1996 by only six percentage points. George W. Bush swung Indiana more firmly to the Republican side once again during his successful campaign in 2000, defeating Democrat Al Gore by over 15 points in the state. Bush increased his margin of victory even more in 2004, defeating Democrat John Kerry by 20 percentage points, 5 points better than in his first presidential run. Bush consolidated and accrued large margins in the state's abundant rural counties, sometimes winning 70–80% of the vote in those areas. Democrats were competitive only in Lake, Monroe, LaPorte, and Marion (home to Indianapolis) counties during the Bush years.

In 2008, Democratic nominee Barack Obama won the state by 0.09% over Republican John McCain, the first time a Democrat won the state since Lyndon Johnson in 1964. Obama made several large inroads in the state's rural counties. McCain still won most of these counties, but Obama's inroads contributed to his overall victory. Also, many counties in Indiana's blue-collar northwest swung away from McCain. This election was considered an upset due to the state's traditional Republican lean. The state was back to voting Republican in the 2012 presidential election, breaking for Mitt Romney by more than ten points.

Donald Trump and his running mate, Indiana native Mike Pence, won the state over Democrat Hillary Clinton by a 20-point margin, improving on Romney's margin mainly because of third-party candidates in the 2016 election and the fact that Pence was on the ticket. In his unsuccessful 2020 reelection campaign, Trump won the state over Democrat Joe Biden by three points fewer than in 2016.

In 2024, Trump won Indiana for a third time in a row over Democrat Kamala Harris, winning by a margin of 19 points, an increase over his 2020 margin but just under his 2016 margin.

Indiana has had a Republican governor since 2005.

During the 2025–2026 United States redistricting conflict, in which multiple Republican-led states were urged by President Donald Trump to redistrict their congressional districts to favor Republicans, a group of Republican Indiana state senators refused to participate in mid-decade redistricting. As a result, millions of dollars were spent by Trump-affiliated groups in the senators' primary elections in May 2026, resulting in many losing their primaries.

== Platform ==
The 2012 party platform contains the party's official stances on key economic, political, and social issues.

The first section of the platform states that the liberties guaranteed in the Constitution and the Bill of Rights must be protected from government erosion. The platform then states a commitment to "protecting and defending our U.S. and Indiana Constitutions," "fiscal responsibility," "federalism," "strong family structures," "individual responsibility," "personal liberty and freedom," "free and fair elections," and "volunteerism."

The Indiana GOP concurs with the current Indiana law that "childbirth is preferred, encouraged, and supported over abortion."

The party also believes that "strong families are the foundation of virtue and that such families bring forth citizens capable of self-government as well as properly motivated public servants so essential for a successful republic."

It stands with the national Republican Party in believing that "limited government truly is good government." It states that the proper role of government is to get out of the way of entrepreneurs and job creators.

The party also supports paying down debt, balancing budgets, and lowering taxes, coupled with a simplified tax code.

The Indiana Republican Party supports the use of Hoosier resources, including expanded clean-coal technology, to reduce dependence on foreign oil.

The platform states Indiana Republicans' belief that Obamacare should be repealed and replaced with free-market solutions.

One amendment was approved and added at the 2012 State Convention: "The Indiana Republican Party shall seek transparency, accountability, and fairness in all levels of government, including a comprehensive audit of the Federal Reserve."

Following the 2012 platform, the Indiana Republican Party progressively updated its core policy stances over subsequent convention cycles to align with shifting national and state priorities.

During the 2016 and 2020 cycles, the platform heavily emphasized national border security—including explicit support for a southern border wall—alongside localized initiatives for state economic growth, job creation, and enhanced election integrity measures such as expanded voter ID requirements.

By the 2022 convention, the platform formally incorporated strong language protecting the "sanctity of human life from conception to natural death," applauding the state legislature's anti-abortion measures, and explicitly endorsing "Constitutional carry" gun laws alongside a vocal defense of Second Amendment rights. The party also added platform language focusing on strict meritocracy in public policy.

Most recently, at the June 2026 State Convention, delegates further updated the policy platform to direct the General Assembly to pursue the complete elimination of property taxes and officially endorsed a transition to closed primary elections.

== Current Indiana Republican officeholders ==
The Indiana Republican Party controls both U.S. Senate seats and seven of the nine U.S. House seats. Republicans control all seven statewide constitutional offices. The party currently holds a majority in both the Indiana House of Representatives and the Indiana Senate.

=== Federal officials ===
==== U.S. Senate ====
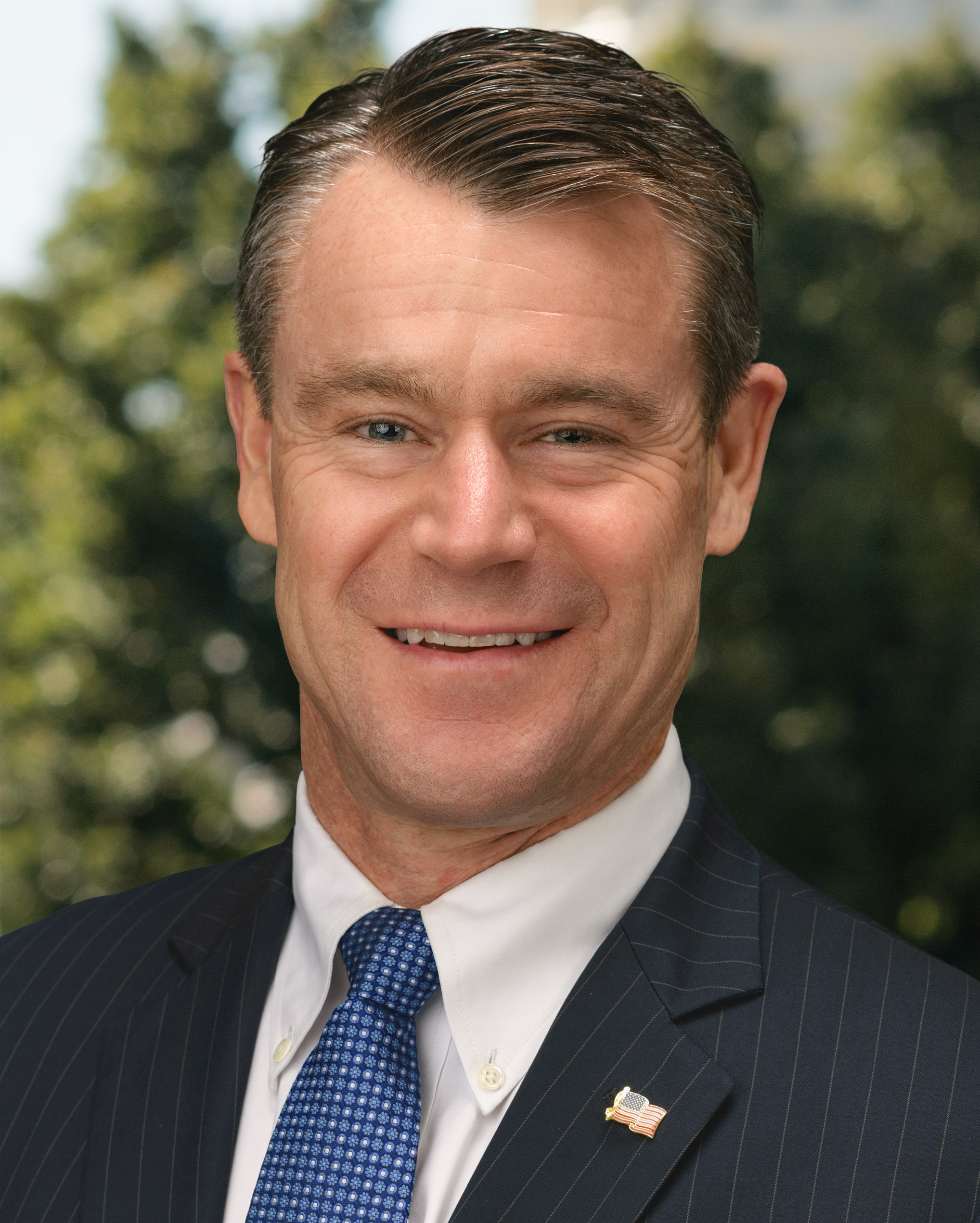
Senior U.S. Senator Todd Young

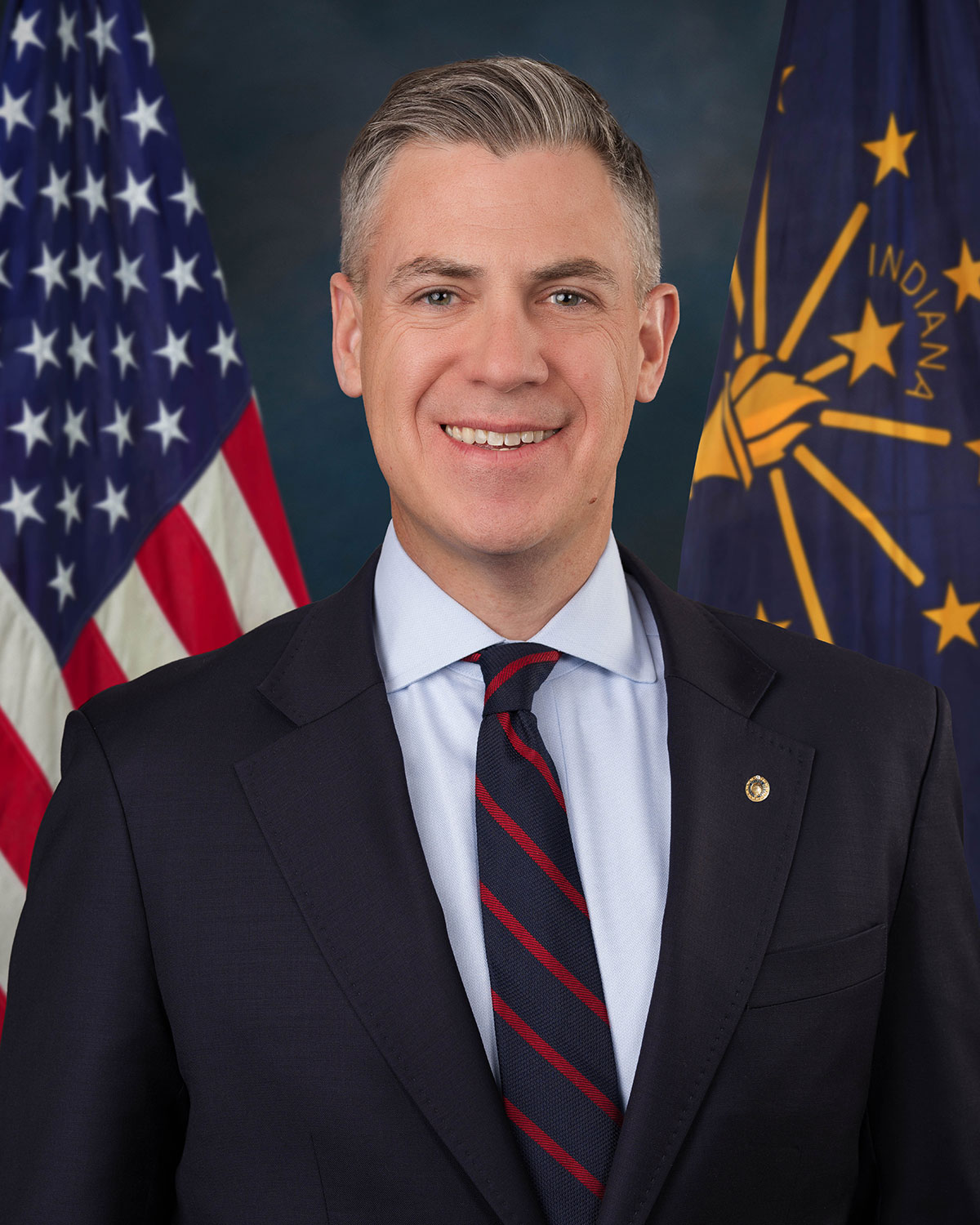
Junior U.S. Senator Jim Banks

==== U.S. House of Representatives ====
District	Member	Photo
2nd	Rudy Yakym	
3rd	Marlin Stutzman	
4th	James Baird	
5th	Victoria Spartz	
6th	Jefferson Shreve	
8th	Mark Messmer	
9th	Erin Houchin	

=== Statewide officials ===
- Governor: Mike Braun
- Lieutenant Governor: Micah Beckwith
- Attorney General: Todd Rokita
- Secretary of State: Diego Morales
- Treasurer: Daniel Elliott
- Auditor: Elise Nieshalla

== State party chairpersons since 1961 ==
- Thomas A. Gallmeyer (1961–1962)
- H. Dale Brown (1962–1963)
- Robert N. Stewart (1963–1965)
- Charles O. Hendricks (1965–1967)
- Buena Chaney (1967–1970)
- John K. Snyder (1970–1972)
- James T. Neal (1972–1973)
- Thomas S. Milligan (1973–1977)
- Bruce B. Melchert (1977–1981)
- Gordon K. Durnil (1981–1989)
- Virgil D. Scheidt (1989)
- Keith Luse (1989–1991)
- Rexford C. Early (1991–1993)
- Al Hubbard (1993–1994)
- Mike McDaniel (1995–2002)
- Jim Kittle (2002–2006)
- Murray Clark (2006–2010)
- Eric Holcomb (2010–2013)
- Tim Berry (2013–2015)
- Jeff Cardwell (2015–2017)
- Kyle Hupfer (2017–2023)
- Anne Hathaway (2023–2024)
- Randy Head (2024)
- Lana Keesling (2025–2026)

== Electoral history ==
=== Gubernatorial ===
Indiana Republican Party gubernatorial election results
Election	Gubernatorial candidate	Votes	Vote %	Result
1992	Linley E. Pearson	822,533	36.90%	Lost ✗
1996	Stephen Goldsmith	986,982	46.78%	Lost ✗
2000	David McIntosh	908,285	41.68%	Lost ✗
2004	Mitch Daniels	1,302,912	53.21%	Won ✓
2008	Mitch Daniels	1,563,885	57.84%	Won ✓
2012	Mike Pence	1,275,424	49.49%	Won ✓
2016	Eric Holcomb	1,397,396	51.38%	Won ✓
2020	Eric Holcomb	1,706,727	56.51%	Won ✓
2024	Mike Braun	1,566,081	54.38%	Won ✓
