= The Times (disambiguation) =

The Times is a British daily newspaper based in London, the original English-language newspaper titled Times.

The Times may also refer to:

== Newspapers ==
=== United States ===
- The Times (Chicago), Illinois, defunct in 2005
- The Times (Little Falls), in upstate New York
- The Times of Northwest Indiana, based in Munster, Indiana
- The Times (Pawtucket), Rhode Island
- The Times (Philadelphia), defunct (1875–1902)
- The Times (Shreveport), Louisiana
- The Times (Trenton), New Jersey
- The Times, one of the predecessors of The Cincinnati Times-Star, Ohio
- The Times (Brownsville), Oregon
- The Times, a newspaper in Tualatin and Tigard, Oregon, published by Pamplin Media Group

=== Elsewhere ===
- The Times (South Africa)
- The Times (Victor Harbor), a regional newspaper in South Australia
- The Times of Ceylon
- The Times of India
- The Times of Israel
- Times of Malta

=== Colloquially "The Times" ===
Note: Newspapers that have the word Times as suffix are often informally referred to as The Times contextually: either within the scope of the newspaper's own articles or by others within their environment.

- Air Force Times
- Altus Times
- Angling Times
- Antrim Times
- Arab Times
- Army Times
- The Aspen Times
- The Baltic Times
- The Bay City Times
- The Beaver County Times
- Beaverton Valley Times
- The Brampton Times
- The Bryan Times
- Brisbane Times
- The Brunei Times (2006–2016)
- The Budapest Times
- Burlington County Times
- The Canberra Times
- Cape Times
- Cape Cod Times
- The Capital Times
- Carroll County Times
- The Catholic Times (disambiguation), several publications
- Chicago Times
- China Times
- Church Times
- Coleraine Times
- Colonial Times
- The Cullman Times
- East Bay Times
- The El Dorado Times
- El Paso Times
- The Epoch Times
- Fiji Times
- The Floyd County Times
- Fort Morgan Times
- Gainesville Times (disambiguation), several publications
- The Gadsden Times
- The Gettysburg Times
- Gippsland Times
- Gloucester County Times
- Gulf Times
- The Gympie Times
- The Hartford Times
- Havana Times
- Hereford Times
- The Hill Times
- The Himalayan Times
- Hindustan Times
- The Huntsville Times
- Inish Times
- International Times (UK)
- The Irish Times
- The Jordan Times
- Kansas City Times
- The Kenton Times
- Kenya Times
- Khaleej Times
- Kuwait Times
- Larne Times
- Leavenworth Times
- Liberty Times
- Los Angeles Times
- The Louisville Times
- The Malibu Times
- Manchester Times
- The Manila Times
- Marine Corps Times
- The Martha's Vineyard Times
- The Montevideo Times
- Morocco Times
- The Moscow Times
- Mountain Times
- Navajo Times
- Navbharat Times
- The Navhind Times
- Navy Times
- Nepali Times
- New Sabah Times
- New Straits Times
- The New York Times
- North County Times
- Northeast Times
- The Northern Times
- Northern District Times
- The Northern Territory Times
- The Oban Times
- The Oxford Times
- Portadown Times
- Quad-City Times
- The Queensland Times
- Richmond and Twickenham Times
- The Roanoke Times
- Saigon Times
- The St. Petersburg Times
- Sakaal Times
- San Mateo County Times
- The Santiago Times
- The Seattle Times
- The Shetland Times
- South Eastern Times
- South Jersey Times
- The Southland Times
- Times of Suriname
- The Straits Times
- The Tacoma Times
- Taipei Times
- Tamil Times
- Tehran Times
- Thomasville Times
- Tirana Times
- The Tolucan Times
- Tyrone Times
- Vientiane Times
- Waikato Times
- The Washington Times
- Wiltshire Times
- Windy City Times
- Yemen Times

== Music ==
=== Groups ===
- The Times (band), a British 1980s–90s independent band
- The Times Showband, Irish showband 1968–1982

=== Albums ===
- The Times, an album by Ian Pooley released in 1996
- The Times (EP), a 2020 Neil Young release

== Other uses ==
- Multiplication, or times, in mathematics
  - Multiplication sign, ×, a glyph read as "times"
- The Times, a 1762 engraving by William Hogarth
- The Times (TV program), an Australian current-affairs program
- Times (TV series), a 2021 South Korean television series
- The Times: How the Newspaper of Record Survived Scandal, Scorn, and the Transformation of Journalism, a 2023 book by Adam Nagourney on the history of The New York Times
- The Times Group, a media-services conglomerate in India
- Times New Roman, or Times, a serif typeface originally commissioned by The Times
- Times Publishing Company, a Florida newspaper and magazine publisher
- Tournament in Management and Engineering Skills, a competition created by the European Students of Industrial Engineering and Management

== See also ==
- The Sunday Times (disambiguation)
- The Tymes, an American soul vocal group
- Time (disambiguation)
