= New York Times (disambiguation) =

The New York Times is a major daily newspaper based in New York City.

New York Times may also refer to:

- The New York Times Company, the media company that publishes the Times
- "New York Times", a song by Cat Stevens from the album Back to Earth
- New York Times, a 1993 album by Carsten Bohn
- New York Times, a 2001 album by Adam Bomb (musician)

== See also ==
- The New York Times Magazine, a weekly newspaper supplement
- Not The New York Times, parody publication
- The New York War Crimes (stylized as The New York ~~Times~~ War Crimes), parody publication
- New York Times Building (disambiguation)
- The Times (disambiguation)
