= Johnston Publishing (NI) =

Northern Irish newspaper group

Johnston Publishing (NI) is a large newspaper group in Northern Ireland consisting of Mortons Newspapers and the News Letter, and is a holding company of JPIMedia. The company was formed following Johnston Press's purchase of Century Newspapers (publishers of the daily newspaper, the News Letter) from Trinity Mirror, and Scottish Radio Holdings' 45 weekly newspapers (Score Press) following their take over by EMAP.

The company is one of the two main holding companies for JPIMedia on the island of Ireland, the other one being Derry Journal Newspapers in the northwest. Johnston Publishing (NI) has its headquarters in Portadown, County Armagh.

== Morton Newspapers/Score Press ==
Morton Newspapers was set up by John Morton in 1936, when he purchased the Lurgan Mail title. It slowly expanded over the next eight decades purchasing the Portadown Times in 1949, the Londonderry Sentinel in 1953 and the Ballymena Times in 1986 amongst others. It also launched several newspapers including the Ulster Star in 1957 and FarmWeek in 1959.

In December 1995, the sale of the company by the Morton family to Scottish Radio Holding's was completed for £11.2m, and became part of Score Press.

Ten years later in 2005, Scottish Radio Holding's 45 titles (sixteen in Scotland, twenty-four in Northern Ireland and five in the Republic of Ireland), including Morton Newspapers, were bought by Johnston Press for £155m and became known as Johnston Publishing (NI). Mortons Newspapers is now a subsidiary of Johnston Publishing (NI), and is used to differentiate between the local newspapers (Mortons) and the daily title, the News Letter. The Republic of Ireland titles were sold to Iconic Newspapers.

The Craigavon Echo has been pulled, as it stopped printing from the first week of June 2010.

== Century Press/Belfast News Letter ==
Century Press and Publishing's main title was the News Letter a leading daily in Northern Ireland. In 1996, what became Trinity Mirror bought a 90% stake in the company for £15m and in 2004 it sold the company along with the Derry Journal Group to the 3i holding company Local Press Ltd for £46.3m.

Local Press was then purchased by Johnston Press a year later in November 2005 for a reported £65m.

After the purchase of Local Press Ltd, the Century was reorganised with the News Letter becoming part of Johnston Publishing (NI) and the rest held by a holding company called Derry Journal Newspapers.

== Current Titles ==
=== Daily ===
- News Letter

=== Local ===
- Ballymena Times
- Antrim Times
- Ballymoney and Moyle Times
- Coleraine Times
- Dromore Leader
- Larne Times
- Londonderry Sentinel
- Lurgan Mail
- Mid Ulster Mail
- Portadown Times
- Tyrone Times
- Ulster Star

=== Free Titles ===
- Banbridge & District Weekender
- Belfast News
- Craigavon Echo
- East Antrim Advertiser
- Lisburn Echo
- Mid Ulster Echo
- North West Echo
