= Dan Quayle =

Vice President of the United States from 1989 to 1993

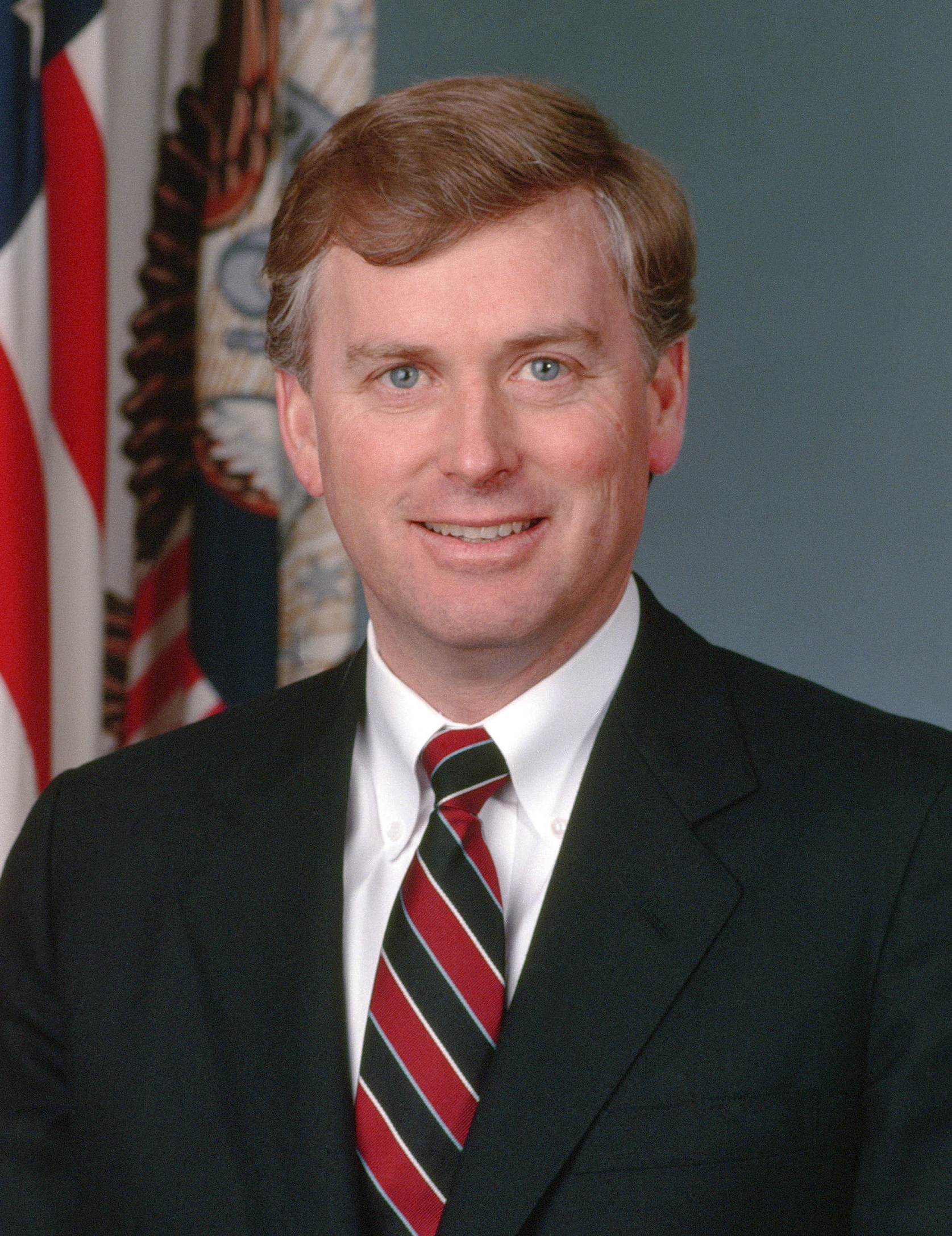
- Official portrait, 1989

44th Vice President of the United States
- In office January 20, 1989 – January 20, 1993
- President: George H. W. Bush
- Preceded by: George H. W. Bush
- Succeeded by: Al Gore

United States Senator from Indiana
- In office January 3, 1981 – January 3, 1989
- Preceded by: Birch Bayh
- Succeeded by: Dan Coats

Member of the U.S. House of Representatives from Indiana's 4th district
- In office January 3, 1977 – January 3, 1981
- Preceded by: Edward Roush
- Succeeded by: Dan Coats

Personal details
- Born: James Danforth Quayle; February 4, 1947 (age 79) Indianapolis, Indiana, U.S.
- Party: Republican
- Spouse: Marilyn Tucker (m. 1972)
- Children: 3, including Ben
- Parents: James C. Quayle; Martha Pulliam
- Relatives: Quayle family
- Education: DePauw University (BA); Indiana University, Indianapolis (JD)

Military service
- Allegiance: United States
- Branch/service: United States Army
- Years of service: 1969–1975
- Rank: Sergeant
- Unit: Indiana Army National Guard
- Quayle's voice Quayle thanking Ronald Reagan for his presidency Recorded November 9, 1988

James Danforth Quayle (Note: /kweɪl/ KWAYL) (born February 4, 1947) is an American retired politician and Indiana National Guard veteran who served as the 44th vice president of the United States from 1989 to 1993 under President George H. W. Bush. A member of the Republican Party, Quayle represented Indiana in the U.S. House of Representatives from 1977 to 1981 and in the Senate from 1981 to 1989.

A native of Indianapolis, Quayle spent most of his childhood in Paradise Valley, a suburb of Phoenix, Arizona, before moving back to Indiana to finish high school. Quayle met his future wife, Marilyn Tucker, while attending night classes at college. He married her in 1972 and had three children including Ben, and obtained his J.D. degree from the Indiana University Robert H. McKinney School of Law in 1974. He and Marilyn practiced law in Huntington, Indiana, before his election to the U.S. House of Representatives in 1976, where he beat incumbent representative, Edward Roush. Quayle would be re-elected in 1978 and serve a total of four years. In 1980 Quayle then ran against popular incumbent senator Birch Bayh. Quayle was expected to lose the race but ultimately defeated the incumbent and was elected to the U.S. Senate. Quayle would be re-elected in 1986, winning in a landslide victory.

Quayle rose to national prominence when in 1988, incumbent vice president and Republican presidential nominee George H. W. Bush chose Quayle as his running mate. His vice presidential debate was notable for Lloyd Bentsen's "Senator, you're no Jack Kennedy" quip. The Bush–Quayle ticket defeated the Democratic ticket of Michael Dukakis and Bentsen, and Quayle succeeded Bush as vice president in January 1989. At the age of 41, Quayle was the third-youngest vice president in U.S. history after Richard Nixon and John C. Breckinridge, a rank that would be beaten by 40-year-old JD Vance in 2025. During his tenure, Quayle made official visits to 47 countries and was appointed chairman of the National Space Council. As vice president, he developed a reputation for making comments that some media outlets perceived to be gaffes. He secured re-nomination for vice president in 1992, but was defeated by the Democratic ticket of Bill Clinton and Al Gore. He was a supporter of free markets, deregulation and of supply-side economics.

After Quayle's vice presidency ended in 1993 he published his memoir in 1994, Standing Firm, which became a bestseller. Quayle then published The American Family: Discovering the Values That Make Us Strong, which was co-authored with Diane Medved and published in 1996. He later published his third book, Worth Fighting For, in 1999. Quayle considered running for president in 1996 but declined because of phlebitis. He sought the Republican presidential nomination in 2000 but withdrew his campaign early on and supported the eventual nominee, George W. Bush. He joined Cerberus Capital Management, a private-equity firm, in 1999. Quayle played crucial roles in his son Ben's U.S. House campaigns in 2010 and 2012 and advised Mike Pence to certify the results of the 2020 United States presidential election. Since leaving office, Quayle has remained active in politics, including making presidential endorsements of the Republican Party in 2000, 2012, 2016, 2020 and 2024. Upon the death of Walter Mondale in April of 2021, Quayle became the earliest-serving surviving vice president.

== Early life and education ==
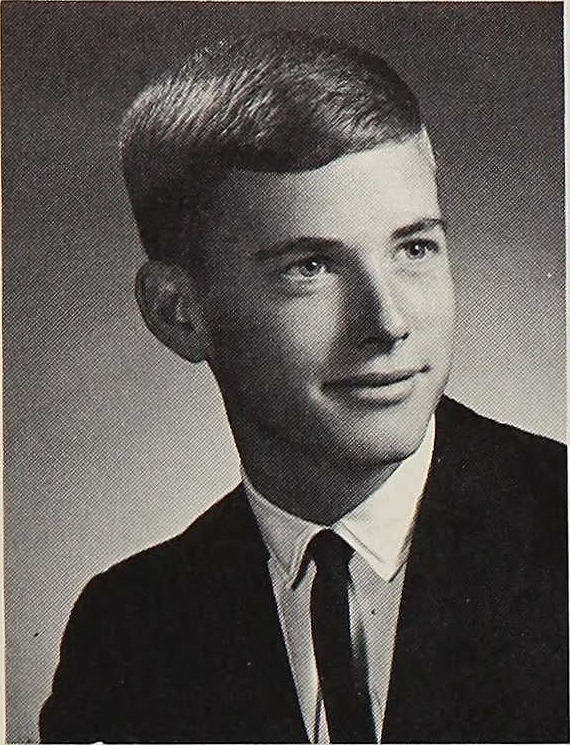
Quayle in Huntington North High School's 1965 yearbook

Quayle was born in Indianapolis, Indiana on February 4, 1947, to Martha (née Pulliam) and James Cline Quayle. Quayle is the oldest of four children. He has two brothers, Christopher and Michael and a sister named Martha. Shortly after being born Quayle's family moved to Arizona. He has sometimes been incorrectly referred to as James Danforth Quayle III. In his memoir he points out that his birth name was simply James Danforth Quayle. The name Quayle originates from the Isle of Man, where his great-grandfather was born.

Quayle's family owned several wealthy businesses which include The Arizona Republic. His grandfather, Eugene C. Pulliam, who bought the two Gazettes as well as the Republic, ran all three newspapers until his death in 1975 at the age of 86. A strong period of growth came under Pulliam, who imprinted the newspaper with his conservative brand of politics and his drive for civic leadership. Pulliam's holding company, Central Newspapers, Inc., as led by Pulliam's widow and son, assumed operation of the Republic/Gazette family of papers upon the elder Pulliam's death. The Arizona Business Gazette is still published to this day. The other business was The Indianapolis Star. His family purchased the Star from Shaffer's estate on April 25, 1944, and adopted initiatives to increase the paper's circulation. In 1944, the Star had trailed the evening Indianapolis News but by 1948 had become Indiana's largest newspaper. In 1948, Pulliam purchased the News and combined the business, mechanical, advertising, and circulation operations of the two papers, with the News moving into the Star's building in 1950. The editorial and news operations remained separate. Eugene S. Pulliam took over as publisher upon the death of his father in 1975, a role he retained until his own death in 1999. Quayle's uncle, Eugene S. Pulliam was the publisher of the Indianapolis Star and the Indianapolis News from 1975 until his death.

After spending much of his youth in Arizona, Quayle returned to his native Indiana and graduated from Huntington North High School in Huntington in 1965. He then matriculated at DePauw University, where he received his B.A. degree in political science in 1969, was the captain of the university golf team and a member of the fraternity Delta Kappa Epsilon (Psi Phi chapter).

After graduation, Quayle joined the Indiana National Guard and served from 1969 to 1975, reaching the rank of sergeant; his joining meant that he was not subject to the draft. In 1970, while serving in the Guard, Quayle enrolled at Indiana University Robert H. McKinney School of Law. He was admitted under a program for students who could demonstrate "special factors" as his grades did not meet the regular admission standards. In 1974, Quayle earned a Juris Doctor (J.D.) degree. At Indiana University, he met his future wife, Marilyn, who was taking night classes at the same law school at the time.

Quayle became an investigator for the Consumer Protection Division of the Office of the Indiana attorney general in July 1971. Later that year, he became an administrative assistant to Governor Edgar Whitcomb. From 1973 to 1974, he was the director of the Inheritance Tax Division of the Indiana Department of Revenue. After graduating from law school in 1974, Quayle worked as associate publisher of his family's newspaper, the Huntington Herald-Press.

=== Family ===
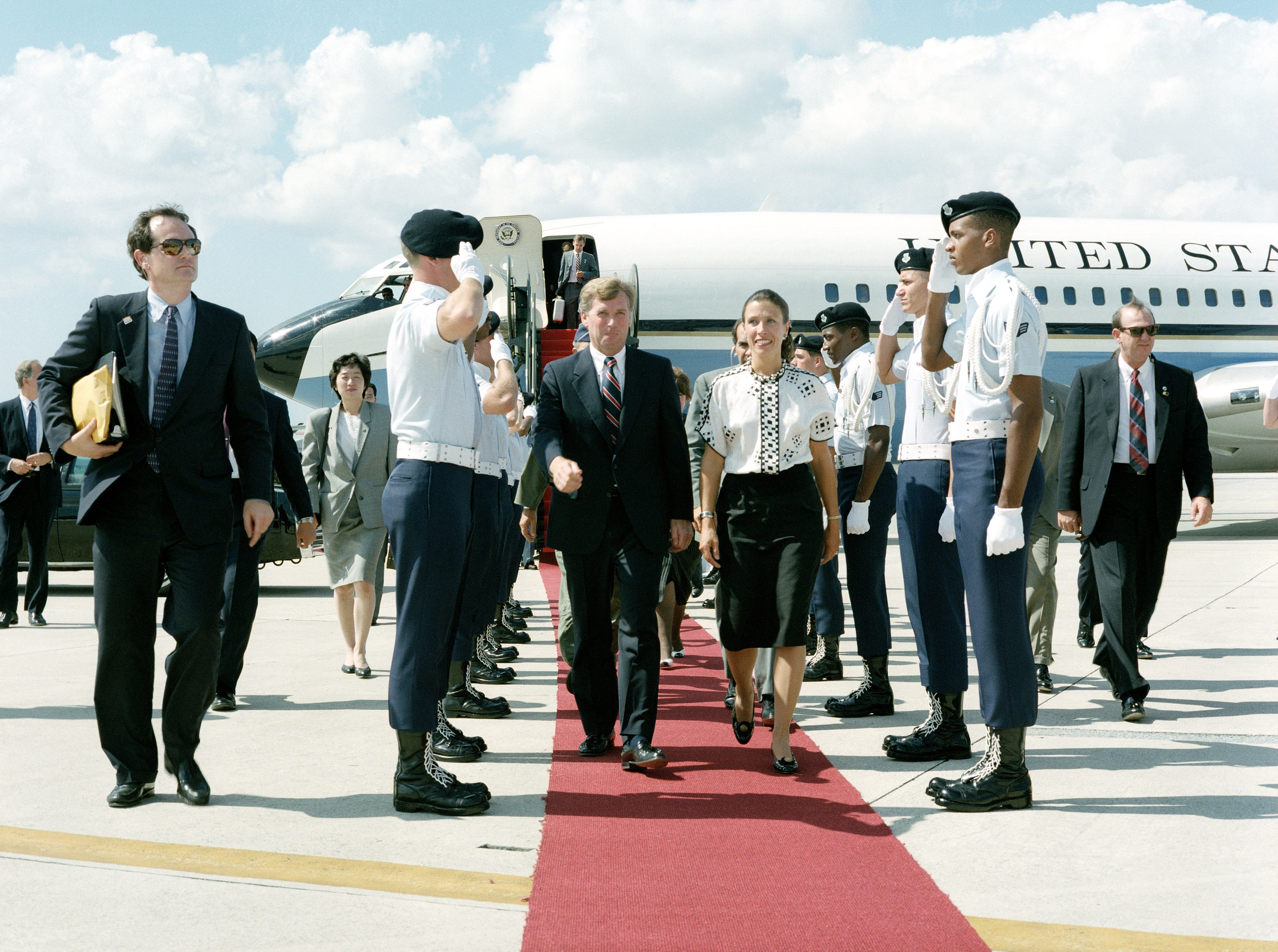
Quayle with his wife, Marilyn getting off Air Force Two

Dan Quayle met Marilyn Quayle in 1972 when the two were attending night classes at Indiana University Robert H. McKinney School of Law and assigned to work on a project together involving the revision of Indiana's death penalty laws. The couple married within weeks in November 1972. Together they had three children: Tucker, Corrine, and Benjamin Quayle. As of the 1990s, the Quayles reside in Paradise Valley, Arizona.

Their son Ben Quayle served one term in the United States House of Representatives from 2011 until 2013 representing Arizona's 3rd Congressional District until he lost re-nomination in the Republican primary to David Schweikert after redistricting.

=== Religion ===
Quayle was raised as a Presbyterian, although his connection to Robert B. Thieme Jr., a fundamentalist, became an issue of political attention during his career.

=== Hobbies ===
Quayle is an avid golfer. He wrote: "One of the reasons I love golf is because of the lessons it teaches about life. One of these lessons I learned during my college years from two great champions. ... I started playing golf when I was eight years old at Paradise Valley County Club in Phoenix. I competed in golf in high school and college where I was captain of my golf team. I learned early the lesson that Casper had learned. But, I have to keep relearning it. And apply it in other areas of my life."

Quayle also wrote that "one of [his] heroes of American history was Abraham Lincoln. Lincoln made an interesting statement that parallels the lesson above that I learned from golf: 'You can fool some of the people all of the time, and all of the people some of the time, but you can not fool all of the people all of the time.'"

== U.S. House of Representatives (1977–1981) ==
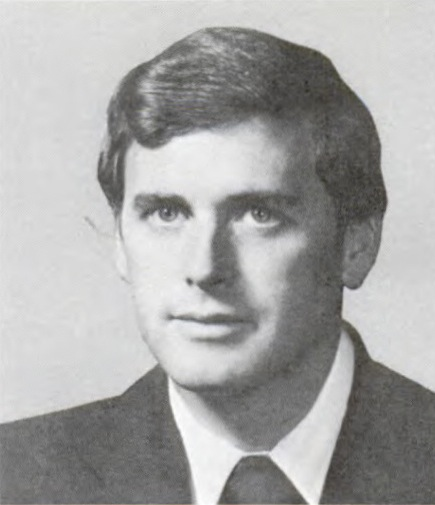
Quayle in 1977, his first term in the House of Representatives

In 1976, Quayle, then a general manager of the Huntington Herald-Press, decided to challenge the incumbent representative for Indiana's 4th congressional district, Democrat J. Edward Roush. Quayle stated that part of his decision to run was because he felt there was a need for congressional reform, labeling Roush's long career as part of the problem. Quayle was challenged for the nomination by Dennis L. Wright. Throughout the primary, due to Wright struggling to raise funding for his campaign, Quayle was seen as the forerunner. Quayle defeated Wright by a margin of 2,558 votes. Wright later switched parties and sought the Democratic nomination the following election. Due to Roush's popularity, Quayle was expected to lose the general election. Despite this, Quayle defeated Roush by a margin of 19,401 votes, around ten percent of the vote. Quayle credited his victory to his connections with newspapers and well-placed advertisements. He was the sole challenger in Indiana to unseat an incumbent representative.

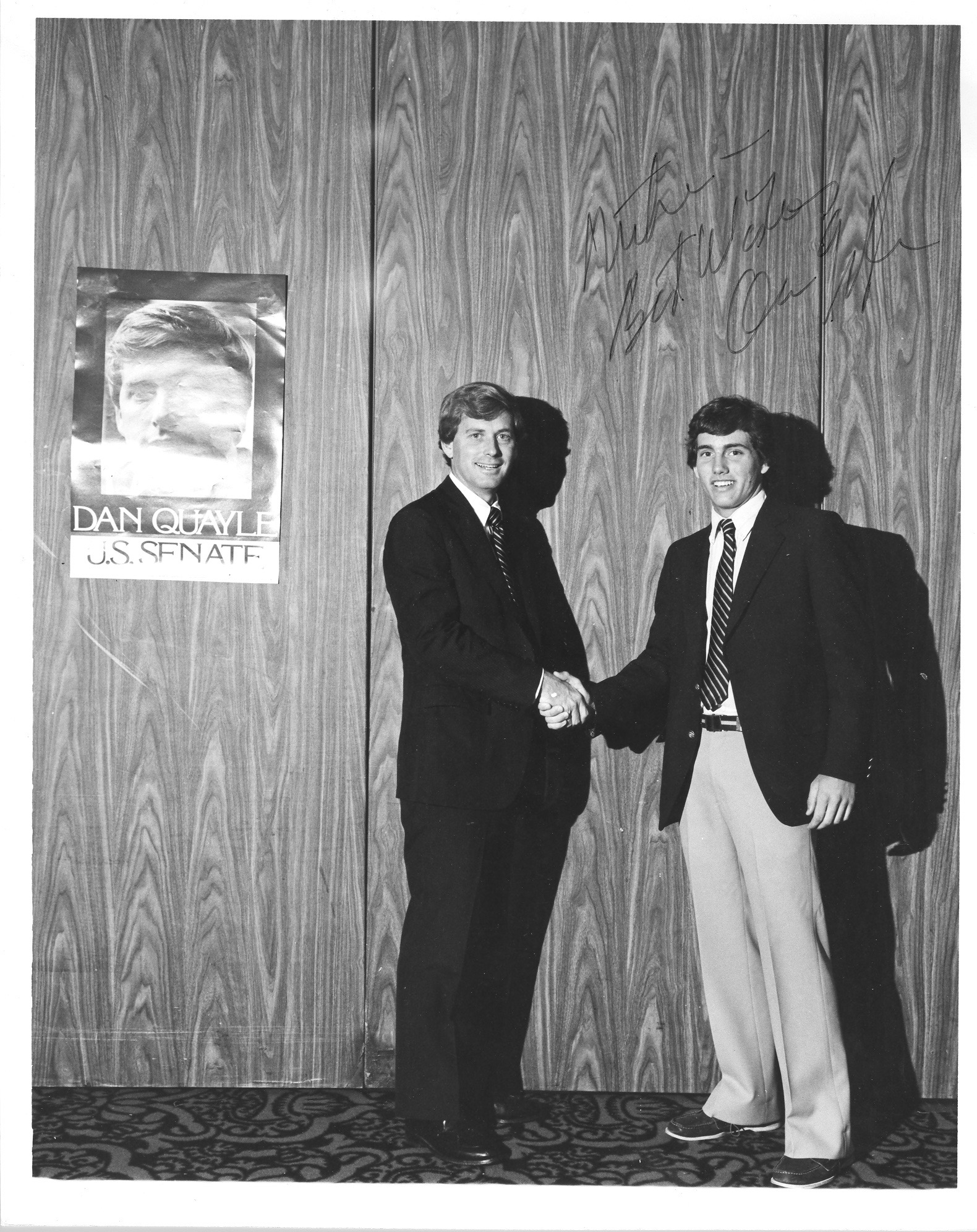
Quayle (left) in 1980

In 1978, Quayle ran for reelection, winning the Republican nomination unopposed. In the general election, he was challenged by Democrat John D. Walda. If he won a second term, Quayle planned to run for Senate in 1980. The South Bend Tribune criticized Walda's campaign as being directionless and unclear on his views. Quayle told the South Bend Tribune that his aides advised against participating in debates with Walda. He went against their advice and debated Walda anyways; he explained that he believed it was important to be open. On Election Day, Quayle received almost twice as many votes as Walda and won a second term.

During his tenure, in November 1978, Congressman Leo Ryan of California invited Quayle to accompany him on a delegation to investigate unsafe conditions at the Jonestown settlement in Guyana, but Quayle was unable to participate. The decision likely saved Quayle's life, because Ryan and his entourage were subsequently murdered at the airstrip in Jonestown as the party tried to escape the massacre.

Quayle did not run for a third term in 1980, and instead successfully ran for the United States Senate .

During his time in the house, Quayle served in three committee's. This includes, United States House Committee on Small Business (95th and 96th Congresses), United States House Committee on Government Operations (95th Congress) and the United States House Committee on Foreign Affairs (96th Congress).

== U.S. Senate (1981–1989) ==
=== 1980 campaign ===
Results by Indiana County, 1980

In 1980, Quayle announced he would run for the United States Senate for the upcoming election. In the Republican primary Quayle defeated Roger Marsh taking 77.06% of the vote to Marsh's 22.94% In the general election, Quayle defeated three-term incumbent Democrat Birch Bayh with 54% of the vote. Bayh was defeated by over 160,000 votes to Representative Quayle. At age 33, Quayle became the youngest person ever elected to the Senate from the state of Indiana.

Birch Bayh, the incumbent senator, faced no opposition from Indiana and avoided a primary election. Bayh was originally elected in 1962 and re-elected in 1968 and 1974. He was Chairman of Senate Intelligence Committee and architect of 25th and 26th Amendments. This election was one of the key races in the country, and signaled a trend that would come to be known as Reagan's coattails, describing the influence Ronald Reagan had in congressional elections.

=== 1986 campaign ===
Results by Indiana County, 1986

Quayle was reelected to the Senate in 1986 with the largest margin ever achieved to that date by a candidate in a statewide Indiana race, taking 61% of the vote against his Democratic opponent, Jill Long.

Pundits believed Quayle would easily win reelection. Additionally, Long struggled to fund her campaign raising just over $100,000 to Quayle's $2,200,000. A debate between the pair was held on September 7, 1986.

=== Tenure ===
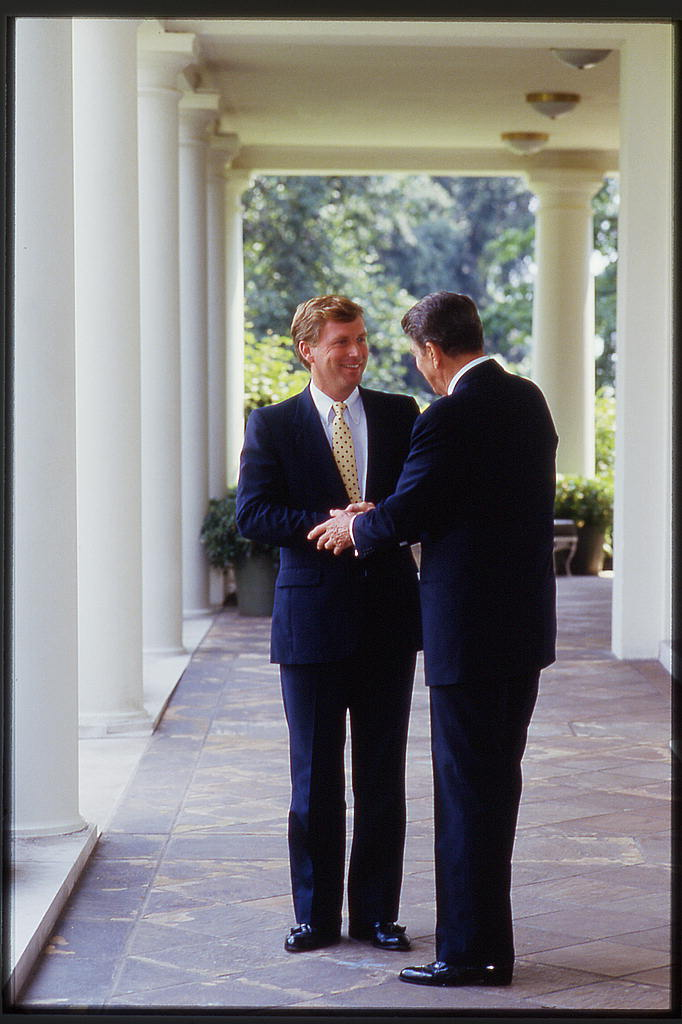
Quayle with President Ronald Reagan

In 1986, Quayle was criticized for championing the cause of Daniel Anthony Manion, a candidate for a federal appellate judgeship, who was in law school one year ahead of Quayle. The American Bar Association had evaluated Manion as "qualified/unqualified", its lower passing grade. Manion was nominated for the Seventh Circuit of the U.S. Court of Appeals by President Ronald Reagan on February 21, 1986, and confirmed by the Senate on June 26, 1986.

Quayle was active on Armed Services and Labor and Human Resources Committees, emphasizing defense strengthening, SDI, and job creation. One of his major legislative accomplishments was co-authoring the 1982 JTPA, which overhauled federal job training programs.

During Quayle's tenure in the United States Senate, he had served on chairman of a special committee investigating the Senate committee system, often called the "Quayle Committee," focused on procedural reforms.

==== Committee assignments ====
- United States Committee on Labor and Human Resources
- United States Committee on Armed Services
- United States Committee on Budget
- United States House Committee on Appropriations

=== Resignation ===
Due to his and then-vice president George H.W. Bush's victory in the 1988 presidential election, Quayle resigned from the Senate. Republican representative Dan Coats of Indiana's 4th congressional district was appointed to fill the vacancy. Coats ran for reelection in the 1990 special election in Indiana, winning the remainder of Quayle's term.

== 1988 vice presidential campaign ==
=== 1988 election campaign ===
Bush Quayle 1988 campaign logo

On August 16, 1988, at the Republican convention in New Orleans, Louisiana, George H. W. Bush chose Quayle to be his running mate in the 1988 United States presidential election. The choice immediately became controversial. Outgoing president Reagan praised Quayle for his "energy and enthusiasm". Press coverage of the convention was dominated by questions about "the three Quayle problems". The questions involved his military service, a golf holiday in Florida where he and several other politicians shared a house with lobbyist Paula Parkinson, and whether he had enough experience to be vice president.

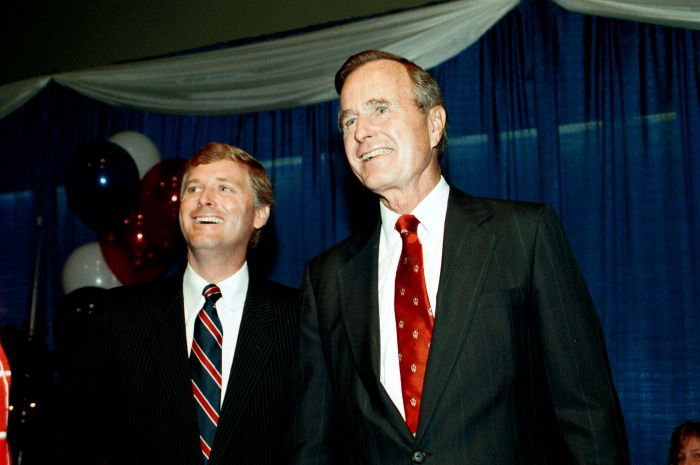
Quayle and Bush at the 1988 Republican National Convention

Quayle seemed at times rattled and at other times uncertain or evasive as he responded to questions. Delegates to the convention generally blamed television and newspapers for the focus on Quayle's problems, but Bush's staff said they thought Quayle had mishandled the questions about his military record, leaving questions dangling. Although Bush was trailing by up to 15 points in public opinion polls taken before the convention, in August the Bush–Quayle ticket took the lead, which it did not relinquish for the rest of the campaign.

In the October 1988 vice-presidential debate, Quayle debated Democratic candidate Lloyd Bentsen. During the debate, Quayle's strategy was to criticize Dukakis as too liberal. When the debate turned to Quayle's relatively limited experience in public life, he compared the length of his congressional service (12 years) with that of President John F. Kennedy (14 years); Kennedy had less experience than his rivals during the 1960 presidential nomination. It was a factual comparison, although Quayle's advisers cautioned beforehand that it could be used against him. Bentsen's response – "I served with Jack Kennedy. I knew Jack Kennedy. Jack Kennedy was a friend of mine. Senator, you're no Jack Kennedy" – subsequently became a part of the political lexicon.

The Bush–Quayle ticket won the November election by a 53–46 percent margin, sweeping 40 states and capturing 426 electoral votes. He was sworn in on January 20, 1989.

Voting map of the 1988 United States presidential election

==== Indiana National Guard controversy ====
Since the 1988 United States elections, Quayle has been the subject of controversy regarding his service in the Indiana National Guard from 1969 to 1975. Many of Quayle's political opponents, media outlets, and Vietnam veterans have speculated that Quayle joined the Indiana National Guard as a means to avoid the draft or to avoid being deployed to Vietnam. In August 1988, Quayle denied the accusations. Quayle's draft controversy received renewed attention during the 1992 United States elections after Democratic nominee Bill Clinton was accused of similar draft dodging measures.

In September 1992, Quayle acknowledged that joining the Indiana National Guard cut his risks of being deployed to Vietnam, although he defended his decision. In a 1992 interview with NBC's Meet the Press, Quayle was pressed on whether his main motivation was to avoid being sent to fight in Vietnam. Quayle stated that he had preferences for joining the reserves, and that he never asked for preferential treatment. Quayle also noted that had his unit been called, he would have deployed, stating:

Of course you had much less chance to go to Vietnam, but my unit could have been called up to go to Vietnam. And had it been called up, I would have gone.

In a resurfaced 1989 interview with David Hoffman, filmmaker and Vietnam veteran Oliver Stone commented on Quayle and made contrasts between him and then-Nebraska governor Bob Kerrey, noting:

I'm hopeful of people like Bob Kerrey, for example, [the] governor of Nebraska, would be a presidential candidate. He's about forty-two and lost a leg in Vietnam. [He's a] very bright man, compassionate, he's been there. I think he'd make a fine president. Against him would be a guy like Dan Quayle, who is also about the same age, early forties—a heartbeat away from the presidency—a man who has never really suffered pain—a man who went to the National Guard to avoid Vietnam, and yet he's one who always calls for military intervention in Central America, with other people's bodies. You have that hypocrisy at work.

== Vice presidency (1989–1993) ==
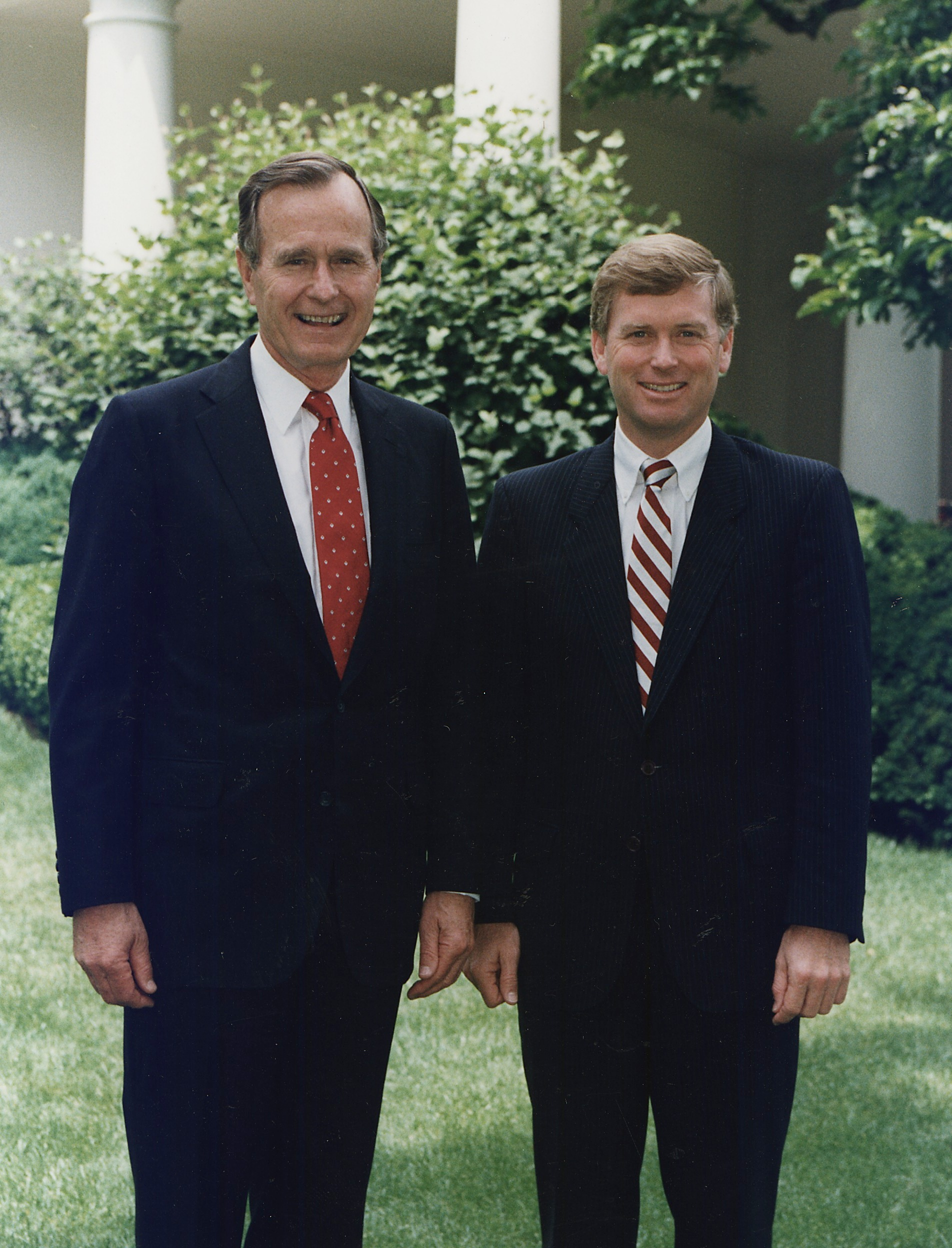
Quayle with President George H. W. Bush in 1989

During the transition period, Quayle navigated questions regarding his past, including his military service, and worked to establish himself as a capable partner, often highlighting his experience in the House and Senate. He was prepared to chair the National Space Council and the Council on Competitiveness, roles he officially assumed upon taking office in January 1989.

On January 20, 1989, at noon, Quayle became the 44th vice president of the United States, sworn into the office by justice Sandra Day O'Connor, making him the first vice president to be sworn in by a female justice of the Supreme Court.

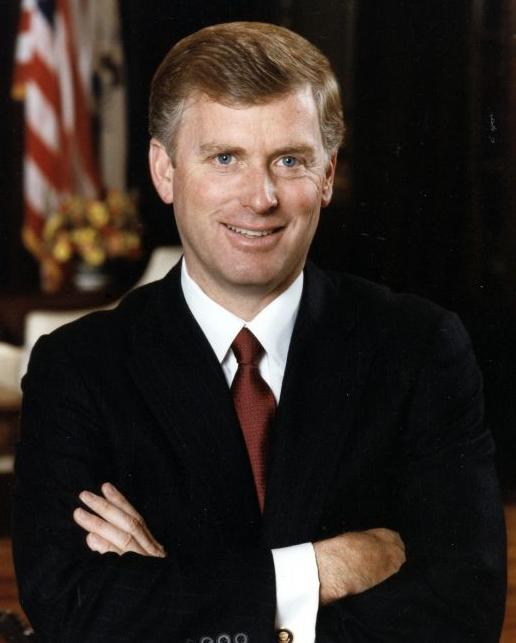
Official portrait, 1990

=== Tenure ===
Bush named Quayle head of the Council on Competitiveness and the first chairman of the National Space Council. As head of the NSC he called for greater efforts to protect Earth against the danger of potential asteroid impacts. After a briefing by Lt. General Daniel O. Graham, (USA Ret.), Max Hunter, and Jerry Pournelle, Quayle sponsored the development of an experimental Single Stage to Orbit X-Program, which resulted in the building of the McDonnell Douglas DC-X.

Quayle cast no tie-breaking votes as president of the Senate, becoming only the second vice-president (after Charles W. Fairbanks) not to do so while serving a complete term.

In 2016, Quayle described the vice presidency as "an awkward office. You're president of the Senate. You're not even officially part of the executive branch—you're part of the legislative branch. You're paid by the Senate, not by the executive branch. And it's the president's agenda. It's not your agenda. You're going to disagree from time to time, but you salute and carry out the orders the best you can".

==== Murphy Brown ====
On May 19, 1992, Quayle gave a speech titled Reflections on Urban America to the Commonwealth Club of California on the subject of the Los Angeles riots. In the speech he blamed the violence on a decay of moral values and family structure in American society. In an aside, he cited the single mother title character in the television program Murphy Brown as an example of how popular culture contributes to this "poverty of values", saying, "It doesn't help matters when prime-time TV has Murphy Brown – a character who supposedly epitomizes today's intelligent, highly paid, professional woman – mocking the importance of fathers, by bearing a child alone, and calling it just another 'lifestyle choice'."

The "Murphy Brown speech" became one of the most memorable of the 1992 campaign. Long after the outcry had ended, the comment continued to have an effect on U.S. politics. Stephanie Coontz, a professor of family history and the author of several books and essays about the history of marriage, said that this brief remark by Quayle about Murphy Brown "kicked off more than a decade of outcries against the 'collapse of the family'". In 2002, Candice Bergen, the actress who played Brown, said "I never have really said much about the whole episode, which was endless, but his speech was a perfectly intelligent speech about fathers not being dispensable and nobody agreed with that more than I did." Others interpreted it differently; singer Tanya Tucker was widely quoted as saying "Who the hell is Dan Quayle to come after single mothers?"

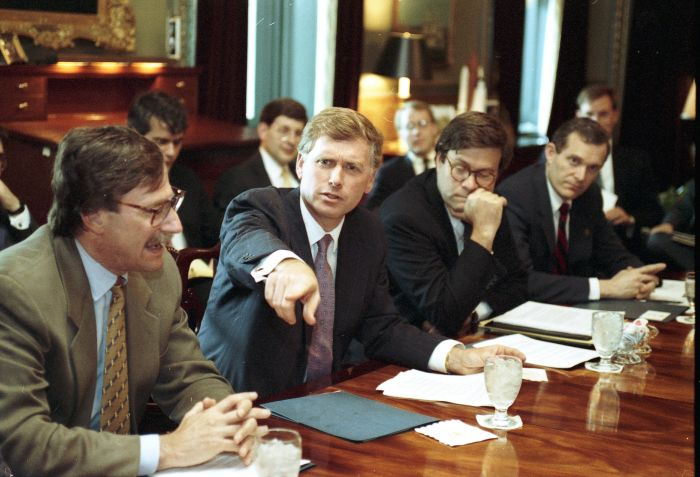
Quayle leads a meeting on regulatory relief.

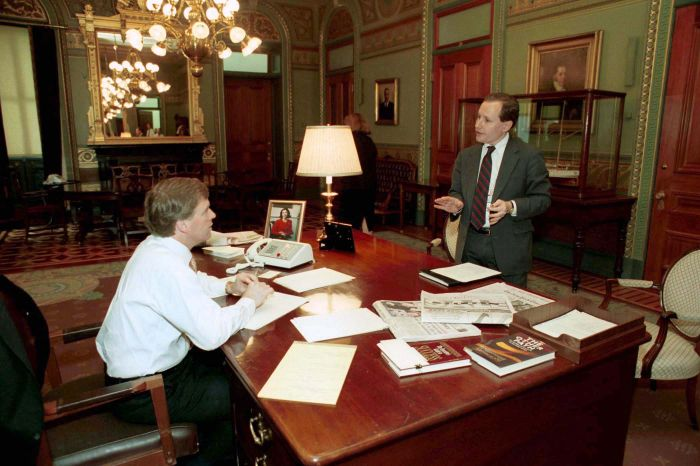
Quayle and Bill Kristol, Chief of Staff to the Vice President of the U.S.

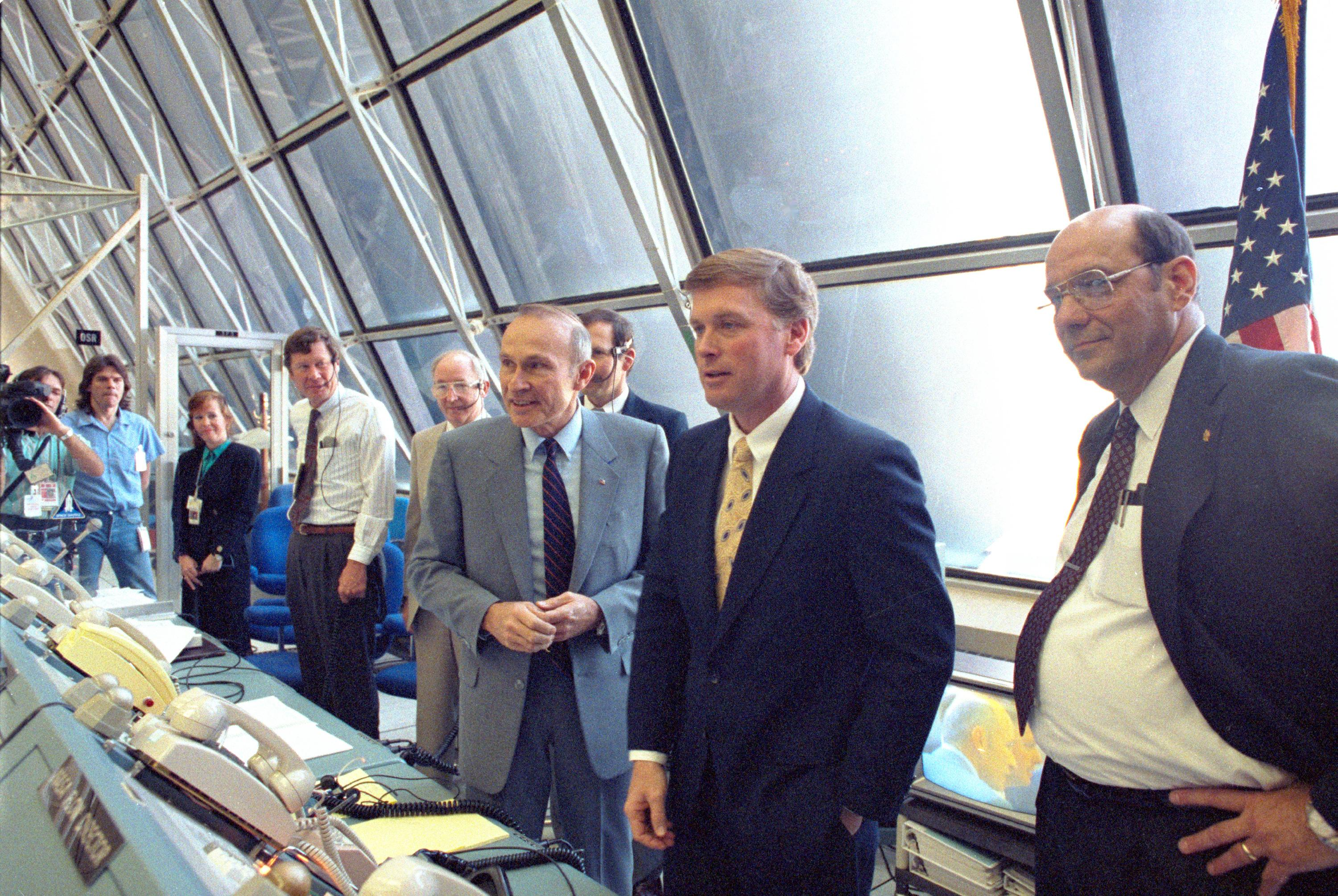
Quayle attending the Terminal Countdown Demonstration Test for Space Shuttle mission STS-39

==== National Space Council ====
While serving as the first chairman, Quayle had advocated for greater efforts to protect Earth from potential disasters such as potential asteroid impacts. He had also sponsored the development of DC-X, an experimental single-stage to orbit rocket.

==== International and domestic trips ====
During his vice presidency, Quayle made official trips to 47 countries, making him the most traveled vice president in history. Quayle's first solo mission was to Venezuela and El Salvador. In June 1989, he visited Costa Rica to support the administration of President Alfredo Cristiani. In 1990, he toured Chile, Brazil and other countries in South America to focus on strengthening ties with regional neighbors.

In early 1991, he toured southwestern Saudi Arabia to visit U.S. pilots and sailors in the Persian Gulf region, affirming American readiness to remove Iraq from Kuwait. He made visits to South Korea, Japan, the Philippines, and Australia, as well as Singapore and Thailand.

In October 1991, he completed an African tour, which was his 16th foreign trip, visiting nations including Nigeria, Liberia, and Malawi. Quayle visited Richmond, Virginia and discussed Middle East concerns. He visited Rochester, New York to tour a Xerox plant and attended a Republican fundraising event.

==== Perceived gaffes ====
Throughout his time as vice president, Quayle was characterized by some media outlets and journalists as being unprepared for the position. Given his position, his comments were heavily scrutinized for factual and grammatical errors. Contributing to this perception of Quayle was his tendency to make public statements that were either impossible ("I have made good judgments in the past. I have made good judgments in the future"), self-contradictory ("I believe we are on an irreversible trend toward more freedom and democracy, but that could change"), self-contradictory and confused ("The Holocaust was an obscene period in our nation's history. ... No, not our nation's, but in World War II. I mean, we all lived in this century. I didn't live in this century, but in this century's history"), or just confused (such as the comments he made in a May 1989 address to the United Negro College Fund (UNCF)).

Commenting on the UNCF's slogan – which is "a mind is a terrible thing to waste" – Quayle said, "You take the UNCF model that what a waste it is to lose one's mind or not to have a mind is being very wasteful. How true that is".

On June 15, 1992, Quayle altered 12-year-old student William Figueroa's correct spelling of "potato" to "potatoe" at the Muñoz Rivera Elementary School spelling bee in Trenton, New Jersey. He was the subject of widespread ridicule for his error. According to The New York Times and Quayle's memoirs, he was relying on cards provided by the school, which Quayle says included the misspelling. Quayle said he was uncomfortable with the version he gave, but did so because he decided to trust the school's incorrect written materials instead of his own judgment.

=== 1992 re-election campaign ===
In the 1992 election, Bush and Quayle were challenged in their bid for reelection by the Democratic ticket of Arkansas governor Bill Clinton and Tennessee senator Al Gore and the independent ticket of Texas businessman Ross Perot and retired vice admiral James Stockdale.

As Bush lagged in the polls in the weeks preceding the August 1992 Republican National Convention, some Republican strategists (led by Secretary of State James Baker) viewed Quayle as a liability to the ticket and pushed for his replacement. Quayle ultimately survived the challenge and secured re-nomination.

Voting map of the 1992 United States presidential election

During the 1992 presidential campaign, Quayle told the news media that he believed homosexuality was a choice, and "the wrong choice". Quayle faced off against Gore and Stockdale in the vice presidential debate on October 13, 1992. He attempted to avoid the one-sided outcome of his debate with Bentsen four years earlier by staying on the offensive. Quayle criticized Gore's book Earth in the Balance with specific page references, though his claims were subsequently criticized by the liberal group FAIR for inaccuracy.

In Quayle's closing argument, he sharply asked voters, "Do you really believe Bill Clinton will tell the truth?" and "Do you trust Bill Clinton to be your president?" Gore and Stockdale talked more about the policies and philosophies they espoused. Republican loyalists were largely relieved and pleased with Quayle's performance, and his camp attempted to portray it as an upset triumph against a veteran debater, but post-debate polls were mixed on whether Gore or Quayle had won. It ultimately proved to be a minor factor in the election, which Bush and Quayle lost, 168 electoral votes to 370 in a landslide.

During his final months as vice president, Quayle primarily focused on his constitutional duties as president of the Senate during the transition to the incoming Clinton-Gore administration. On January 6, 1993, Quayle presided over the certification of the 1992 presidential election, confirming the electoral victory of his and Bush's opponents, Bill Clinton and Al Gore.

He oversaw the winding down of his office and the transfer of responsibilities to Al Gore. This included finalizing work on the bodies he chaired, such as the President's Council on Competitiveness and the National Space Council. In the weeks following the November election, he continued to publicly advocate for the Republican platform, specifically focusing on "traditional family values," smaller government, and tax reduction.

== Post–vice presidency (1993–present) ==
Quayle's tenure as vice president of the United States ended on January 20, 1993, with the first inauguration of Bill Clinton.

In 1993, Quayle became a trustee of the Hudson Institute. From 1993 to January 1999, he served on the board of Central Newspapers, Inc., and from 1995 until January 1999, he headed the Campaign America political action committee.

Quayle authored a 1994 memoir, Standing Firm, which became a bestseller (the book was ghostwritten by Thomas Mallon). Quayle's second book, The American Family: Discovering the Values That Make Us Strong, was co-authored with Diane Medved and published in 1996. He later published his third book Worth Fighting For, in 1999.

Quayle's first memoir, Standing Firm: A Vice-Presidential Memoir (1994) is about his time as vice president. The memoir goes in depth and reveals his selection as VP in the 1988 election, his working relationship with George H. W. Bush and what he believes led to his loss in the 1992 presidential election. It is noted for its critical analysis of media coverage, as well as its discussion of inner-party dynamics, including interactions with figures like James Baker and Jack Kemp.

Quayle's second memoir, The American Family: Discovering the Values That Make Us Strong (1996) was co-authored with Diane Medved. The memoir focuses on family values, which is a topic Dan Quayle had heavily focused on during his time as vice president, particularly following his 1992 comments on the sitcom Murphy Brown. Quayle's last memoir, Worth Fighting For (1999) was released during speculation that he would run in the 2000 United States presidential election. The memoir outlines his views on both foreign and domestic policy. It includes chapters speaking about American cultural issues, foreign policy (particularly "Security Abroad"). In the text there is a proposed future agenda titled "A Future Worth Fighting For".

Quayle moved to Arizona in 1996. He considered but decided against running for governor of Indiana in 1996, and decided against running for the 1996 Republican presidential nomination, citing health problems related to phlebitis.

In 1997 and 1998, Quayle was a "distinguished visiting professor of international studies" at the Thunderbird School of Global Management.

In 1999, Quayle joined Cerberus Capital Management, a multibillion-dollar private-equity firm, where he serves as chair of the company's Global Investments division. As chair of the international advisory board of Cerberus Capital Management, he recruited former Canadian prime minister Brian Mulroney, who would have been installed as chair if Cerberus had acquired Air Canada.

In 2001, Quayle accompanied by his wife attended the First inauguration of George W. Bush and Dick Cheney.

The Dan Quayle Center and Museum, in Huntington, Indiana, features information on Quayle and all U.S. vice presidents. Quayle is an honorary trustee emeritus of the Hudson Institute and president of Quayle and Associates. He has also been a member of the board of directors of Heckmann Corporation, a water-sector company, since the company's inception and serves as chair of the company's Compensation and Nominating & Governance Committees. Quayle is a director of Aozora Bank, based in Tokyo, Japan. He has also been on the boards of directors of other companies, including K2 Sports, AmTran Inc., Central Newspapers Inc., BTC Inc. and Carvana Co.

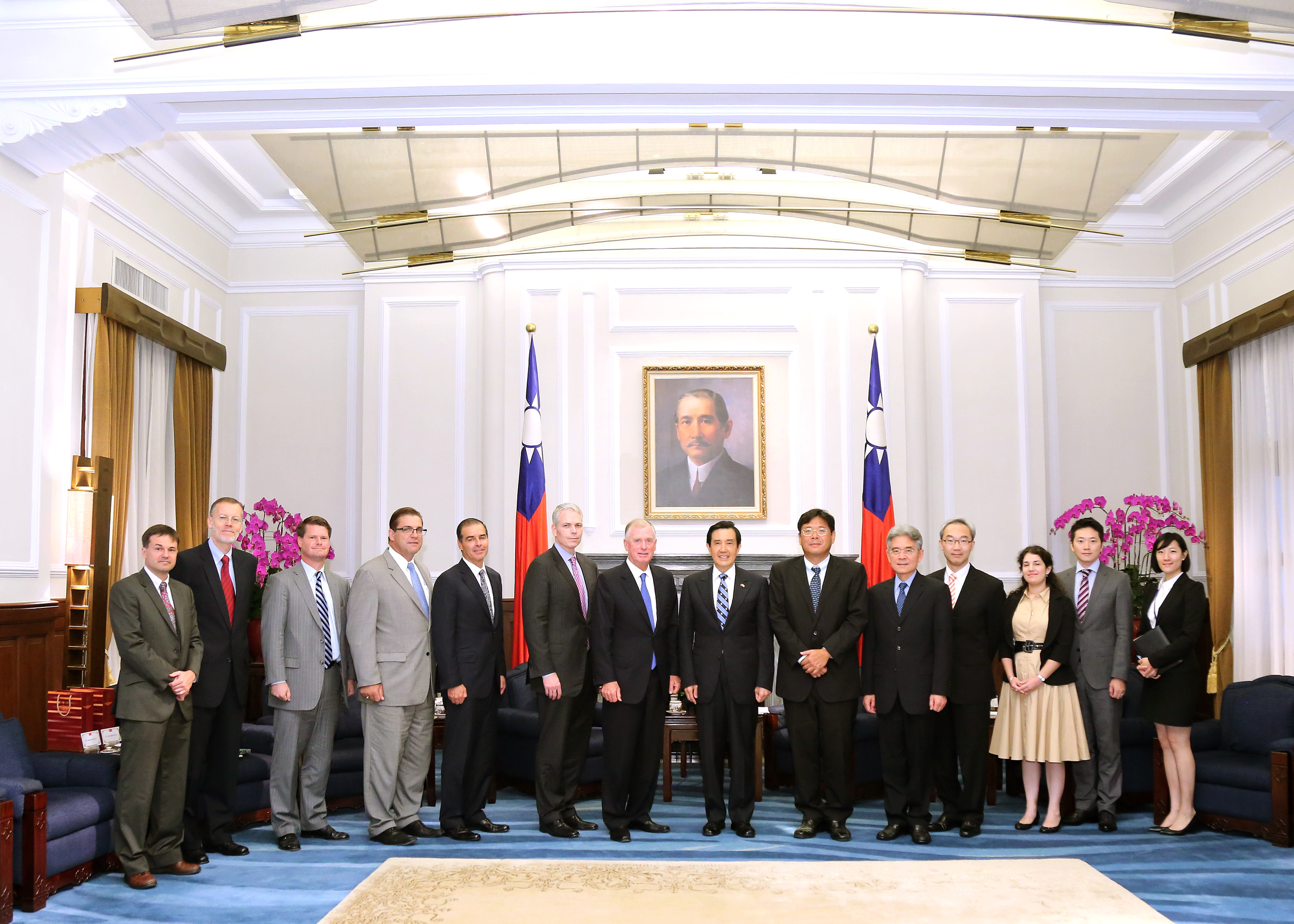
Quayle on a foreign trip in 2015

Quayle, then working as an investment banker in Phoenix, was mentioned as a candidate for governor of Arizona before the 2002 election, but declined to run.

In 2005, Quayle attended the Second inauguration of George W. Bush and Dick Cheney

In 2010, Quayle's son, Ben Quayle, ran for the House of Representatives from Arizona. Quayle played a central role in his son's campaign. Ben Quayle raised over $1.3 million for his 2010 campaign, much of which came from his father's long-time associates and friends. With Quayle's connections, he was able to bring his son major contributions and endorsements from George H. W. Bush's former Defense Secretary Donald Rumsfeld, and various Indiana business leaders. Dan Coats, who had succeeded Dan Quayle in the House and Senate, made favorable contributions.

During the Republican primary, Quayle sent a last-minute email to supporters fiercely defending Ben against allegations that he wrote for a raunchy website called Dirty Scottsdale. He called the attacks an "ugly, slanderous assault" and "over the top". Quayle stood with his son in early campaign advertisements and during his victory speech when he won the election to become a member of the House 52–41%.

In 2012 after redistricting, Quayle's son faced a serious primary challenge from fellow U.S. Rep. David Schweikert. Dan Quayle continued to provide strong financial backing through his national Republican establishment network. Schweikert stated that "Dan Quayle has raised for all sorts of political causes lots of money" and that they were prepared for the elder Quayle's influence." Ben Quayle very narrowly lost the primary, becoming a one term house member.

During his son's tenure, Quayle served as a mentor to his son, helping him in key decisions and givin

In 2009, Quayle and his wife attended the First inauguration of Barack Obama and Joe Biden.

On January 31, 2011, Quayle wrote a letter to President Barack Obama urging him to commute Jonathan Pollard's sentence.

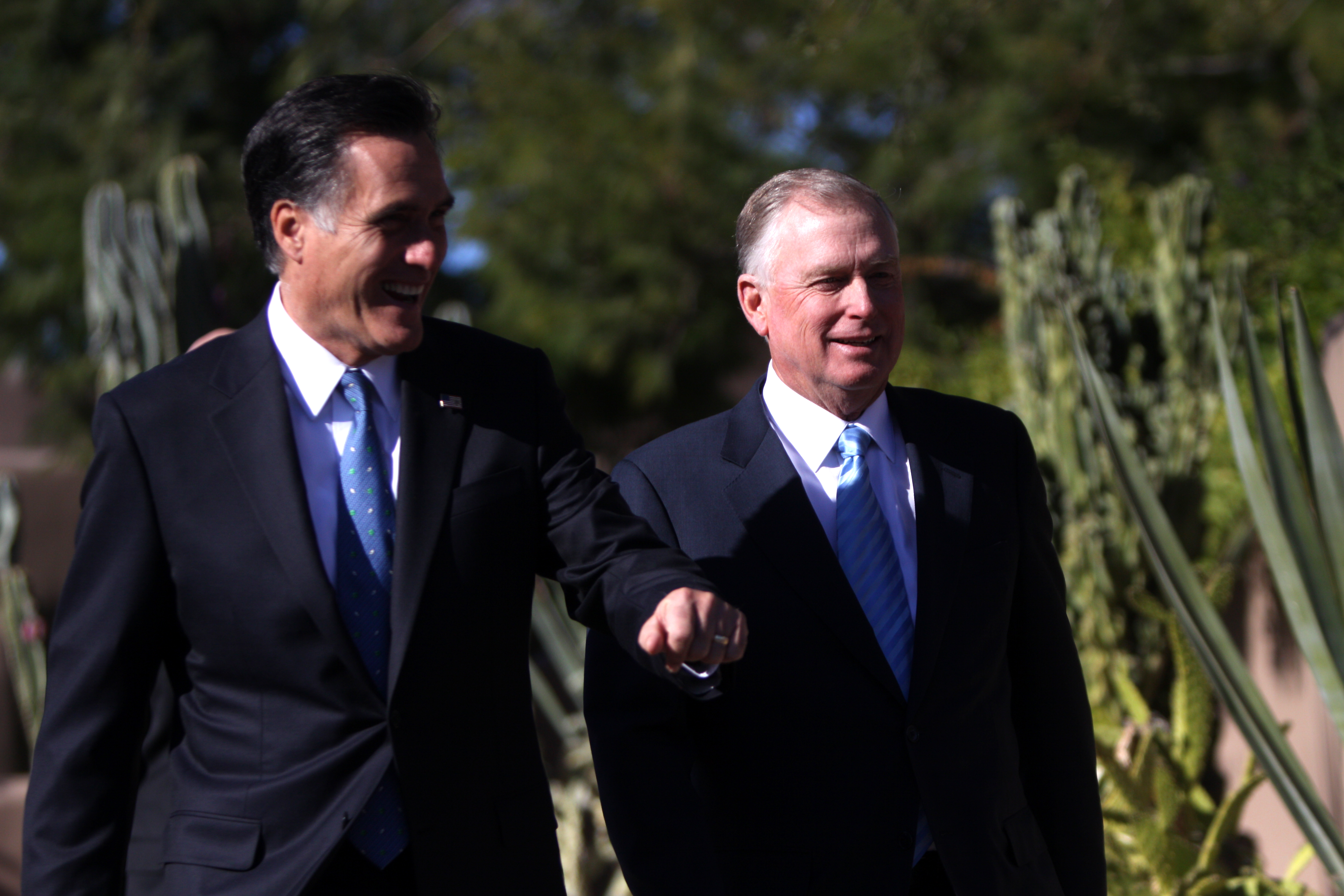
Quayle with Mitt Romney

On December 6, 2011, Quayle endorsed former Governor of Massachusetts Mitt Romney for the Republican nomination for the 2012 presidential election. Quayle actively campaigned for Romney, describing him as the most formidable candidate and stated that he believed he could beat incumbent President Barack Obama. Quayle frequently commented on the state of the U.S. economy leading up to the election. He argued that the sluggish economic recovery under Obama would be a central issue for voters.

In 2013, Dan Quayle and his wife Marilyn attended the Second inauguration of Barack Obama and Joe Biden.

In early 2014, Quayle traveled to Belfast, Northern Ireland, in an attempt to speed approval for a deal in which Cerberus acquired nearly £1.3 billion in Northern Ireland loans from the Republic of Ireland's National Asset Management Agency. The Irish government is investigating the deal, and the US Securities and Exchange Commission, the Federal Bureau of Investigation, and the United States attorney for the Southern District of New York are investigating Quayle's involvement as a potentially "very serious" misuse of the vice president's office. As of December 2018, Quayle served as chair of Global Investments at Cerberus.

In May 2016, Quayle endorsed Donald Trump, and urged his party to unite around the nominee, many of which (including former Presidents George H.W. Bush and George W. Bush) refused to endorse him. Quayle also stated that he thought that Trump could win, citing an anti-establishment shift.

In 2017, Quayle attended by his wife attended the First inauguration of Donald Trump and fellow hoosier Mike Pence.

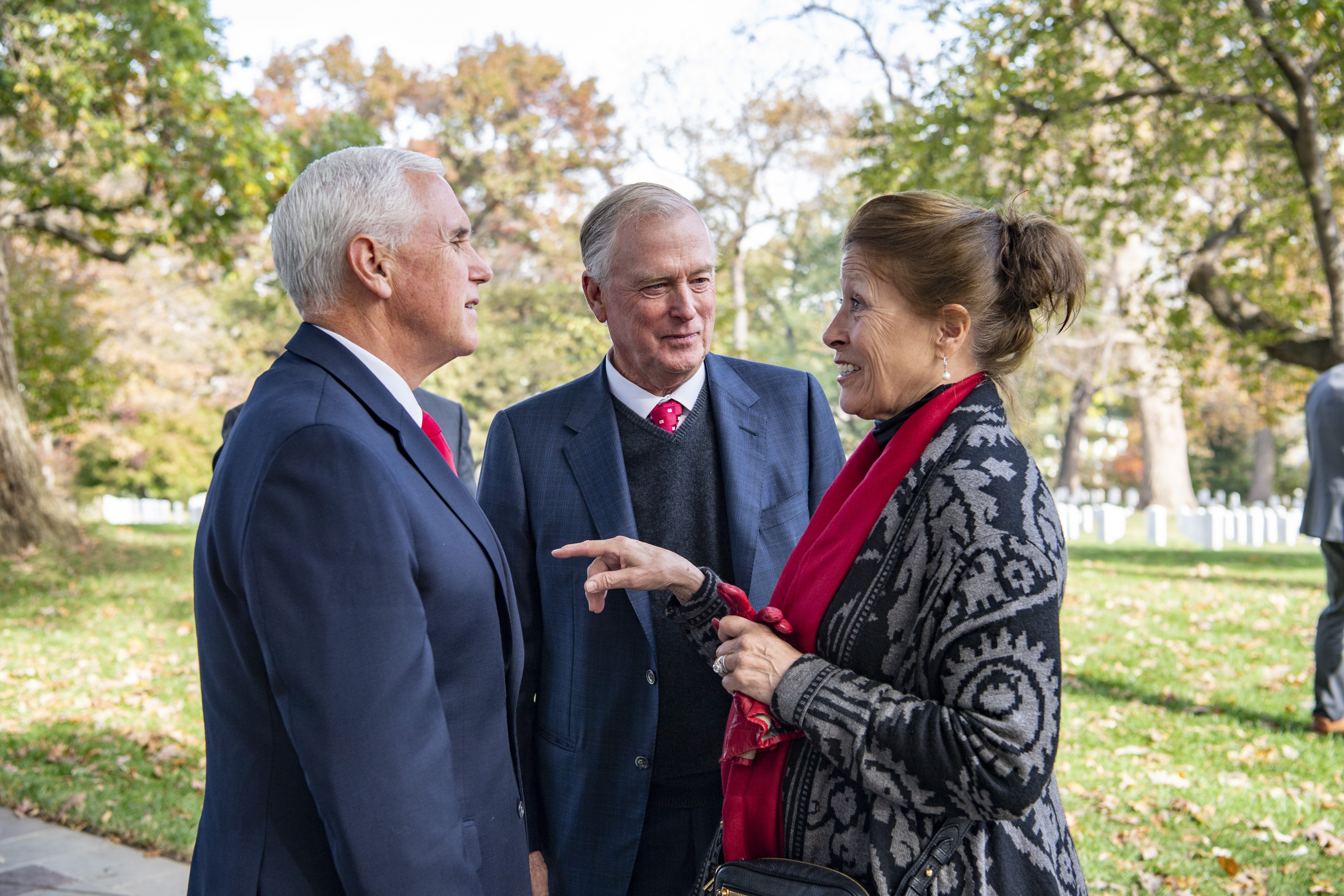
Dan (middle) and Marilyn Quayle (right) with Vice President Mike Pence (left) in 2019

Following the 2020 United States presidential election, according to the book Peril by Bob Woodward and Robert Costa, Quayle played a central role in advising fellow Hoosier and then-vice president Mike Pence to certify the 2020 presidential election following the Senate rules, rather than cooperate with a plan by then-president Trump that sought to overturn the election, before the 2021 Capitol attack.

In January 2021, Quayle and his wife attended the Inauguration of Joe Biden and Kamala Harris and spoke out about his regrets regarding President Trump's decision not to attend the inauguration.

In 2025, Quayle accompanied by his wife Marilyn attended the Second inauguration of Donald Trump and JD Vance.

In 2026, Quayle attended the swearing in of Kevin Warsh as Chair of the Federal Reserve at the White House.

== 2000 presidential campaign ==
Logo from Quayle's 2000 presidential campaign

During a January 1999 appearance on Larry King Live, Quayle said he would run for president in 2000. On January 28, 1999, he officially created an exploratory committee. On April 14, 1999, at a rally held at his alma mater Huntington North High School's gymnasium, Quayle officially launched his campaign for the 2000 Republican presidential nomination. In July 1999, he published his book, Worth Fighting For.

During campaign appearances, Quayle criticized fellow candidate George W. Bush. Early on, he criticized Bush's use of the term "compassionate conservative".

By August, multiple news sources were stating that performing well in the Iowa Straw Poll, held on August 14, was crucial to Quayle's continuing candidacy. By August 9, Quayle had spent 39 days campaigning in the state, and he had attacked the Clinton administration's agriculture policies while campaigning in the largely agricultural state. Quayle downplayed the importance of the poll and compared it to a political machine, where candidates "buy votes". Quayle stated that he would continue his campaign regardless of his finish in the poll.

On August 11, in an opinion poll conducted prior to the straw poll, Quayle received 5 percent of the vote, behind Bush (37 percent), Steve Forbes (14.6 percent), and Bob Dole (9 percent). The straw poll results were worse for Quayle, as they saw him finish in eighth place and behind several other conservative candidates. He gathered 916 votes, for 4 percent of the total, compared to Bush, the winner, who gathered 7,418 votes for 31 percent of the total. Following the straw poll, numerous news sources began to report that Quayle's campaign would be significantly hurt by the results, while Bush had solidified his frontrunner status. Quayle's former Chief of Staff Bill Kristol stated, "I think he should get out [of the race]. He's a good man, and he's served the country well, but it'd be better for him to get out now than to soldier on."

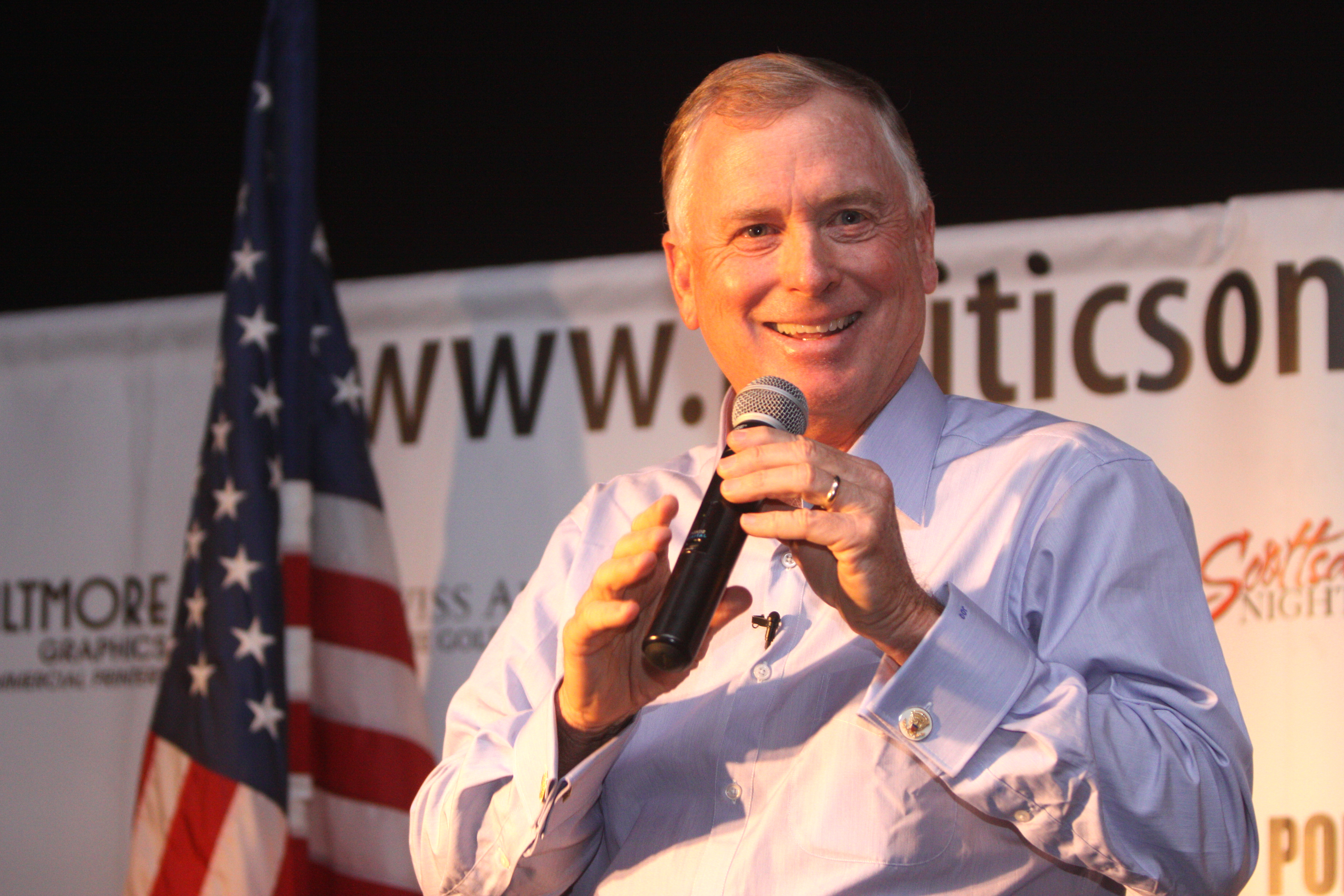
Quayle in 2000 campaigning in Scottsdale, Arizona

Quayle remained in the race and continued to downplay the straw poll, stating in one interview that he participated "out of respect to the Iowa Republican Party". As late as September 9, journalist Adam Nagourney of The New York Times stated that Quayle receiving the Republican nomination remained "a realistic goal, if admittedly a difficult one". Meanwhile, Representative Roscoe Bartlett, who had just taken over as head of Quayle's campaign operations in Maryland, called his task in the campaign either "a profile in courage or an act of stupidity".

On September 27, despite continued campaigning, multiple sources reported that, according to some of his advisors, Quayle was planning to drop out of the race. By this point in the race, Bush had firmly established himself as the frontrunner and had raised over $50 million compared to Quayle's $3.4 million. The following day, at a ballroom in the Arizona Biltmore Hotel in Phoenix, Quayle announced an end to his candidacy, citing a lack of funds and support. While he did not offer an endorsement for any other candidates, he stated his intent to help whoever gained the Republican nomination to succeed. On October 5, he appeared on the Late Show with David Letterman, where he stated that he would be uninterested in becoming the Republican nominee's running mate. In 2000, Quayle endorsed George W. Bush, who won the election and was inaugurated as president in 2001.

Quayle was the last former vice president until fellow Hoosier Mike Pence in 2024 to not receive their party's nomination when running.

== Political positions ==
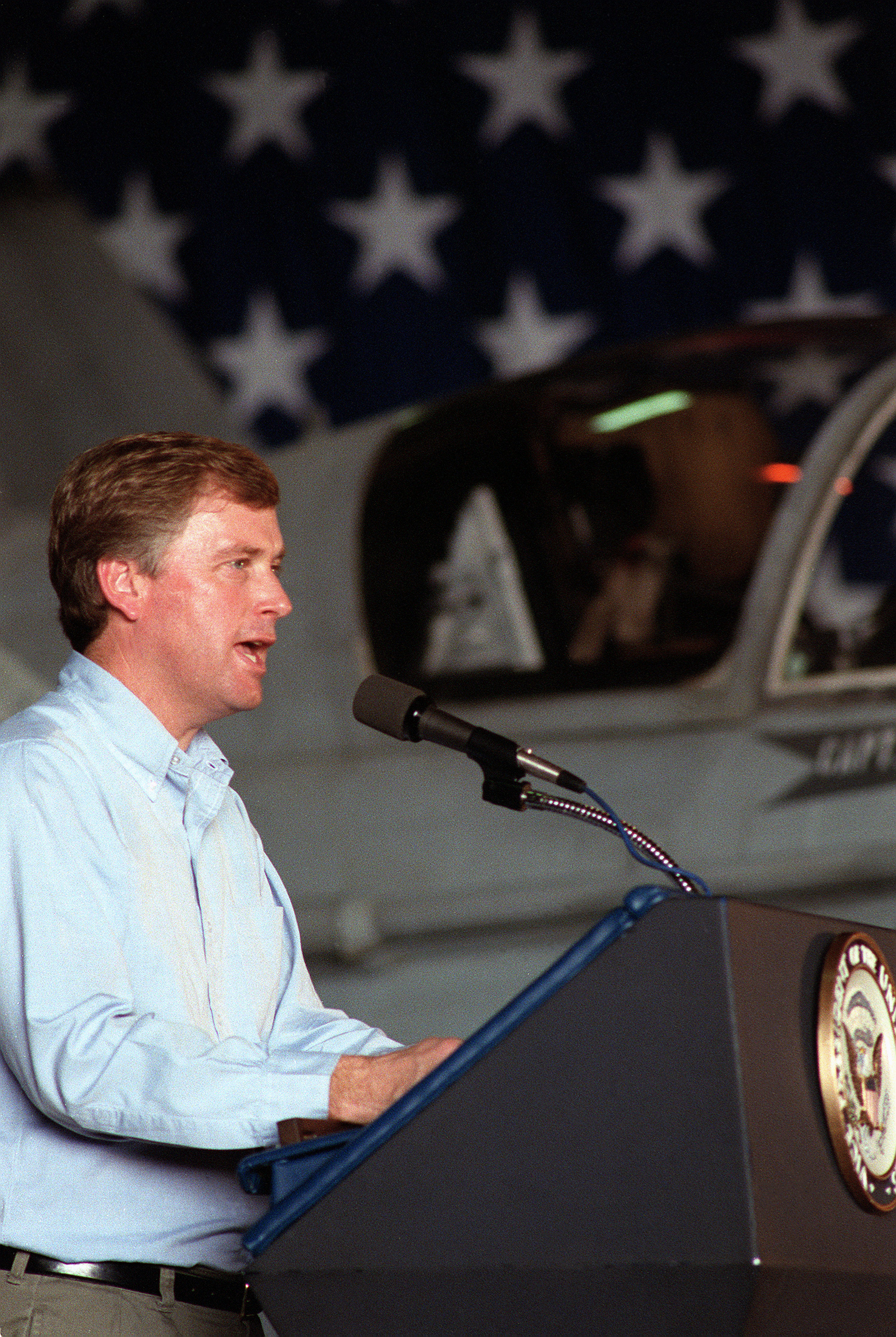
Quayle speaks to crew members aboard the aircraft carrier USS JOHN F. KENNEDY (CV-67).

Throughout his life, Dan Quayle has never supported a Democratic nominee and has always supported and voted for Republicans, although he has only made few public endorsements. In 2000, he endorsed George W. Bush after dropping his own bid for the presidency. In December 2011, Quayle endorsed Mitt Romney for the 2012 Republican presidential nomination. During the 2016 Republican Party presidential primaries, Quayle initially endorsed Jeb Bush. After Bush failed to win the nomination, Quayle endorsed the eventual nominee Donald Trump. He again voted for Trump in 2020, citing his closeness with Vice President Mike Pence, and conservative policy. He was the only former vice president and the highest-ranking official to publicly vote for Donald Trump in the 2024 United States presidential election.

Quayle has promoted traditional family structures and had famously criticized the sitcom Murphy Brown, for glorifying out-of-wedlock births, sparking a major national debate on single-parent families. He strongly opposes abortion, consistently voting against federal funding for the procedure and supporting constitutional amendments aimed at overturning Roe v. Wade. During his life, Quayle has advocated for school prayer and has favored stricter control over educational curriculum.

Quayle was and has been a firm believer in the supply-side philosophy. He has been in favor of lowering taxes to stimulate investment and job growth. During his tenure, Quayle had served as Chair of the Council of Competitiveness. When he was chair, he pushed to reduce the council and to reduce bureaucratic red tape and environmental regulations on businesses. He has generally opposed major expansions to federal safety nets. He has voted against and opposed funding childhood immunization, Women, Infants, and Children (WIC) programs, and school lunch expansions.

He has maintained a highly somewhat hawkish stance by supporting a robust military, the expansion of defense budgets, and strategic defense initiatives during the Cold War. During his time as vice president, Quayle was chair of the National Space Council. During this time, he advocated for American space exploration and technological superiority.

Dan Quayle supports the values of the Republican party. He has supported the Republican presidencies and has established his New Right credentials early in his career. Quayle had supported supply-side economics and supported reduced government spending and tax reduction to lower the deficit and advocate for the establishment of enterprise zones to foster development. He has also maintained a consistently conservative stance on strengthening national security and a robust military posture. Quayle is known for championing his family values and opposing abortion. He has often focused on the breakdown of a family as the root cause of social issues. He famously engaged in debates over family structure, criticizing cultural trends.

Quayle was seen as a leader for the religious right, emphasizing moral issues in public life.

=== Views on Bill Clinton ===
Dan Quayle heavily targeted the domestic and international policies of the Clinton administration, focusing his critiques entirely on executive governance rather than personal scandals. With the economy, Quayle had dismissed Bill Clinton's fiscal strategies as a "pipe dream" built on top-down government tax-and-spend logic. Quayle had continually argued that Clinton's proposed taxes and government expansions would inherently suppress private market sector growth and eliminate jobs rather than foster a healthy economic environment. With foreign affairs, Quayle had said that Clinton's actions severely eroded America's global standing, lambasting the administration's military interventions and what he described as a distinct lack of independent executive leadership. Quayle also had specifically chided Clinton for ceding American military sovereignty by "buying into the United Nations' agenda" in Somalia. He also had constantly argued that the operation led to humiliation within the United States forces in Mogadishu. Also, Quayle had criticized his administration's reliance on NATO forces, over strong, independent U.S. action in Bosnia, alongside a flawed strategy in Haiti that used unnecessary military deployments rather than focused diplomatic dialogue. Quayle also had targeted the administration's approach with international defense treaties. He argued that Clinton had displayed far too much fidelity to the Anti-Ballistic Missile (ABM) Treaty with the Soviet Union. He also had argued that a total withdrawal from the pact to build space-based missile systems and fiercely criticized the administration for prioritizing Environmental policy of the United States over the escalating global realities of ballistic missile proliferation and terrorism. What Quayle had opposed the most was Clinton's stance toward China. He called the administrations conduct trips to Beijing "absolutely disgraceful." He also rejected the idea that China should be a strategic partner and said that the White House's compromised security commitments to Taiwan and allowed foreign campaign contributions to influence sensitive foreign policy decisions.

=== Views on George W. Bush ===
Quayle was a major supporter of George W. Bush's presidency after he previously had run against him for the 2000 Republican nomination. He supported key national security decisions and humanitarian milestones. He had talked about his own background and what military strategies the administration should follow, following the September 11 attacks. This structural defense included pushing back against mounting anti-war sentiment on Capitol Hill to maintain defense appropriations and preserve robust executive war powers. Quayle was also strongly against heavy bipartisan political winds to endorse the 2007 military surge in Iraq, defending the deployment of thousands of additional troops under General David Petraeus against fierce domestic opposition as the only viable mechanism for stabilizing the region and securing American geopolitical gains. Beyond the military, Quayle was strongly for Bush's major international health initiative, the President's Emergency Plan for AIDS Relief (PEPFAR). Quayle had constantly praised the program not only as an unprecedented humanitarian triumph that saved millions of lives in sub-Saharan Africa but also as a highly sophisticated model of soft-power diplomacy. He also had argued that this very effectively paired American medical resource allocation with long-term international diplomacy to combat global instability from the ground up.

=== Views on Barack Obama ===
Dan Quayle was highly skeptical of Barack Obama and his presidency overall, with not a lot of trust in the administration. He heavily focused his attention on what he characterized as damaging regulatory overreach and weak foreign policy maneuvers. Quayle heavily criticized Obama's heavy environmental mandates and labor rulings, pointing directly to National Labor Relations Board inferences as actions that blocked manufacturing plants from expanding and killed American jobs. Quayle has also argued that Obama's landscape created a climate of corporate uncertainty, effectively putting a stranglehold on domestic infrastructure growth. He also had majorly claimed that Obama's reliance on massive federal deficits and high-tax frameworks slowed down the post-2008 economic recovery and degraded the nation's competitive edge. Regarding international relations, Quayle very much opposed Obama's Middle Eastern diplomacy, warning that the administration's approach created power vacuums that hostile state actors exploited. Quayle notably opposed the administration's Iran nuclear deal, saying that treating Tehran as a stable and equal partner was very dangerous. He said that this action was not good for the United States stating that it could ruin long time U.S. security commitments to Israel, alienate traditional Sunni allies, and heighten the long-term threat of nuclear proliferation across the region.

=== Views on Donald Trump ===
For his first presidency, Quayle repeatedly defended Donald Trump's general capability and instincts to lead, acknowledging him as an effective political force. He has argued that Trump is uniquely qualified for the job as the American electorate desired a political outsider who defies traditional establishment norms. Despite this, Quayle has been a critic of some of the choices of Trump and his administration. Quayle played a critical historical role in checking Trump's executive power by firmly advising Vice President Mike Pence in early 2021 that Pence had absolutely no legal flexibility or authority to block the certification of the legislative transition. Quayle also has praised some of Donald Trump's Conservative appointees such as Neil Gorsuch, Brett Kavanaugh and Amy Coney Barrett. He has also praised his economic achievements. He had also critiqued Trump's aggressive rhetorical style and urged him to focus more on policy substance.

For his second presidency, Quayle has been a large supporter overall and has defended Trump on many key issues. However, Quayle has expressed deep perplexity regarding Trump's approach to foreign affairs, publicly criticizing Trump's perceived affinity for Vladimir Putin. Quayle openly questioned why Trump, as a self-proclaimed dealmaker, has not used more leverage or secondary sanctions to halt Russian aggression in Ukraine during the ongoing Russo-Ukrainian war.

=== Views on Joe Biden ===
Dan Quayle and Joe Biden had been good friends with them both serving in the United States Senate together, frequently describing Biden as a "good guy" whom he genuinely likes. Despite this, Quayle had been a major critic of Biden and his presidency overall. He has strongly opposed Biden's political platform, arguing that he has moved too far to the progressive left. Quayle fundamentally rejects this policy direction, viewing the administration's economic platforms and legislative priorities as a departure from the more moderate, traditional approach he expected from his former Senate colleague. Despite this, Quayle maintained great respect for Biden during his time in office. He actively defended the legitimacy of Biden's authority, and publicly rejected claims of systemic fraud in the executive transition. Quayle also had offered Biden tactical advice on how the administration could handle adversarial pressure during high-stakes public debates.

== Legacy and image ==
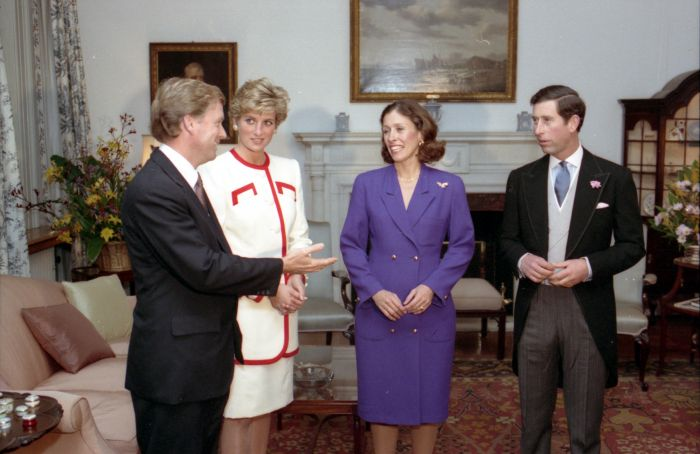
Quayle and his wife with Prince of Wales, Charles and Princess of Wales, Diana

As an elected official, Quayle was a staunch conservative, appealing to the Christian right and positioning himself as a Reagan Republican. Despite his electoral successes at a young age, being elected as a representative at 29, a senator at 33, and vice president at 41, he lacked significant support from Republican leaders. In a 1999 article in The Washington Post, journalist David Von Drehle stated that Quayle "was never the darling of the party core".

His selection as Bush's running mate was questioned by some within the party, and his numerous gaffes damaged his political reputation. Following his term as vice president, Quayle considered running for president in the 1996 presidential election, going so far as establishing an exploratory committee and raising money through a political action committee (PAC) in late 1994. He withdrew from the race in February 1995. Prior to his withdrawal, The New York Times had labeled Quayle as "the most popular candidate among religious conservatives". Executive Director Ralph Reed of the Christian Coalition of America stated that many of his group's members "felt an almost bottomless well of admiration" for Quayle.

=== Approval ===
Quayle's approval ratings were generally around the low 40s to low 50s during his vice presidency. In a poll around August 1989, his job performance approval was at 52% while his disapproval was at 30%. In another poll around July 1992, months before the 1992 United States presidential election, his disapproval rating reached an all-time high of 63%.

== See also ==
- Electoral history of Dan Quayle
- List of Ig Nobel Prize winners
- List of United States senators from Indiana

== Notes ==
U.S. House of Representatives
Preceded by Edward Roush	Member of the U.S. House of Representatives from Indiana's 4th congressional district 1977–1981	Succeeded by Dan Coats
Party political offices
Preceded by Dick Lugar	Republican nominee for U.S. Senator from Indiana (Class 3); 1980, 1986	Succeeded by Dan Coats
Preceded by George H. W. Bush	Republican nominee for Vice President of the United States; 1988, 1992	Succeeded by Jack Kemp
U.S. Senate
Preceded by Birch Bayh	United States Senator (Class 3) from Indiana; 1981–1989; Served alongside: Richard Lugar	Succeeded by Dan Coats
New office	Chair of the Senate Committee System Study Committee; 1984	Position abolished
Political offices
Preceded by George H. W. Bush	Vice President of the United States; 1989–1993	Succeeded by Al Gore
U.S. order of precedence (ceremonial)
Preceded by Joe Biden as Former President	Order of precedence of the United States; Former Vice President	Succeeded by Al Gore as Former Vice President
