= Martha Quayle =

American newspaper publisher and businesswoman

- Born: Martha Corinne Pulliam; June 12, 1922; Franklin, Indiana, US
- Died: November 27, 2014 (aged 92); Wickenburg, Arizona, US
- Education: DePauw University (Bachelor of Arts)
- Occupations: newspaper editor and businesswoman
- Known for: Mother of Dan Quayle
- Political party: Republican
- Spouse: James C. Quayle (m. 1943; died 2000)
- Children: 4, including Dan
- Parents: Eugene C. Pulliam; Martha Ott
- Relatives: Quayle family (by marriage)

Martha Corinne Quayle (née Pulliam; June 12, 1922 – November 27, 2014) was an American newspaper publisher and businesswoman who owned several newspapers in the United States including the Huntington Herald-Press in Indiana and the Wickenburg Sun in Arizona with her husband James C. Quayle. She was the mother of the 44th Vice President of the United States, Dan Quayle and the mother-in law of Second Lady of the United States, Marilyn Quayle.

== Early life ==
Pulliam was born on June 12, 1922, to Eugene C. Pulliam and his second wife Martha Ott. She was born in Franklin, Indiana, and grew up in nearby Lebanon.

Quayle earned a Bachelor of Arts in 1943 from DePauw University, where she was active in wartime service clubs and the Kappa Alpha Theta sorority.

Quayle also served on the board of the Salvation Army and was active in the Tri-Kappa sorority.

Her father, Eugene C. Pulliam, was a longtime owner and publisher of The Arizona Republic and The Indianapolis Star.

The "Pulliam era" began in Arizona in 1946 when Eugene C. Pulliam bought The Republic, the Phoenix Gazette and the Arizona Weekly Gazette, later the Arizona Business Gazette, in a $4 million deal.

== Career ==
After her marriage, she and her husband moved to Arizona in 1978, where Quayle was a founding member of the Humane Society of Wickenburg and helped build the present animal shelter there. She was also a member of the Desert Caballeros Western Museum in Wickenburg.

Taking after her father, Quayle and her husband owned and published the Huntington Herald-Press in Huntington, Indiana, and later the Wickenburg Sun in Arizona.

== Personal life ==
=== Marriage ===
Pulliam married her husband James C. Quayle sometime in the 1940s and in 1947 as the birth of their son Dan Quayle. The couple also had three other children. They also had ten grandchildren and 10 great-grandchildren at the time of Quayle's death. The couple moved to Arizona and has pursued careers there in the newspaper industry.

Quayle's husband served in World War II in the 1940s.

Quayle and her husband, the James C. Quayle, owned and published the Huntington Herald-Press in Huntington, Indiana, and the Wickenburg Sun in Wickenburg.

=== Family ===
Dan Quayle was a United States Representative from Indiana for four years and then a U.S. senator from Indiana for eight years before becoming George H.W. Bush's pick for vice president; Quayle served as vice president for four years. Her grandson Ben Quayle served a term in the United States House of Representatives from Arizona before losing in the Republican primary upon redistricting.

== Death ==
Quayle died from natural causes on November 27, 2014.
