= Family of Dan Quayle =

American political family

Quayle Family
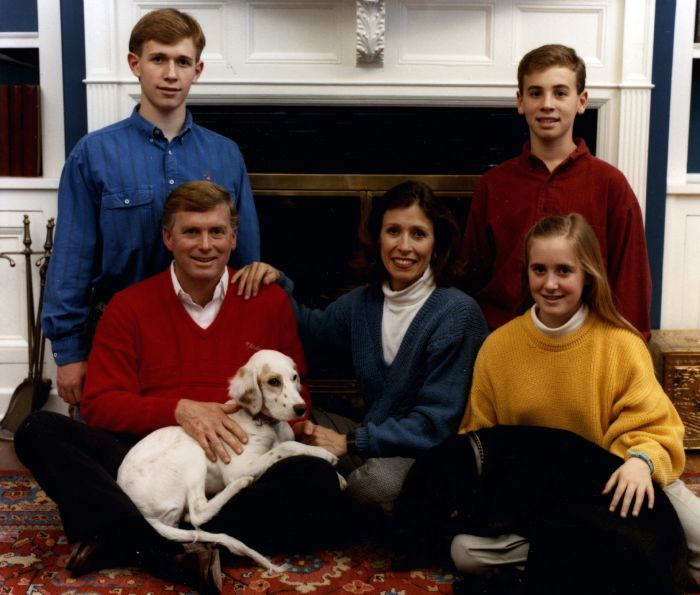
- Quayle Family, 1990.
- Current region: Indiana & Arizona
- Origin: Indiana
- Titles: List: Vice President of the United States; Second Lady of the United States; United States Senator (Indiana); Member of the U.S. House of Representatives (Indiana) (Arizona)
- Members: James C. Quayle; Dan Quayle; Ben Quayle; Corinne Quayle; Tucker Quayle
- Connected members: Marilyn Quayle; Martha Pulliam; Eugene C. Pulliam; Eugene S. Pulliam; Myrta Pulliam
- Connected families: Pulliam Family
- Estates: McLean, VA Home & Wickenburg, AZ Home

The Quayle family is an American political family. The family is located in Indiana and Arizona. The most famous members of the family are Dan Quayle who served as Vice President of the United States from 1989 until 1993 and Marilyn Quayle, who served as Second Lady of the United States from 1989 until 1993. During this time, their residence was the Number One Observatory Circle, the official residence of the Second Family of the United States.

The Quayle family currently resides in Paradise Valley, Arizona, while few members still reside in Indiana.

== History and business ==
The Quayle family origin come from the state of Indiana. The current region of the family is in Indiana and Arizona.

Dan Quayle was born in Indianapolis, Indiana, to Martha Corinne (née Pulliam) and James Cline Quayle. He has sometimes been incorrectly referred to as James Danforth Quayle III. In his memoir he points out that his birth name was simply James Danforth Quayle. The name Quayle originates from the Isle of Man, where his great-grandfather was born.

His maternal grandfather, Eugene C. Pulliam, was a wealthy and influential publishing magnate who founded Central Newspapers, Inc., and owned more than a dozen major newspapers, such as The Arizona Republic and The Indianapolis Star. James C. Quayle moved his family to Arizona in 1955 to run a branch of the family's publishing empire.

=== The Arizona Republic ===
Pulliam, who bought the two Gazettes as well as the Republic, ran all three newspapers until his death in 1975 at the age of 86. A strong period of growth came under Pulliam, who imprinted the newspaper with his conservative brand of politics and his drive for civic leadership. Pulliam was considered one of the influential business leaders who created the modern Phoenix area as it is known today.

Pulliam's holding company, Central Newspapers, Inc., as led by Pulliam's widow and son, assumed operation of the Republic/Gazette family of papers upon the elder Pulliam's death. The Phoenix Gazette was closed in 1997 and its staff merged with that of the Republic. The Arizona Business Gazette is still published to this day.

In 1998, a weekly section geared towards college students, "The Rep", went into circulation. Specialized content is also available in the local sections produced for many of the different cities and suburbs that make up the Phoenix metropolitan area.

=== The Indianapolis Star ===
Central Newspapers, Inc. and its owner, Eugene C. Pulliam, the maternal grandfather of future Vice President Dan Quayle, purchased the Star from Shaffer's estate on April 25, 1944, and adopted initiatives to increase the paper's circulation. In 1944, the Star had trailed the evening Indianapolis News but by 1948 had become Indiana's largest newspaper.

In 1948, Pulliam purchased the News and combined the business, mechanical, advertising, and circulation operations of the two papers, with the News moving into the Star's building in 1950. The editorial and news operations remained separate. Eugene S. Pulliam took over as publisher upon the death of his father in 1975, a role he retained until his own death in 1999.

In September 1995, the newsroom staffs of the Star and the News merged. In 1999, the News ceased publication, leaving the Star as the only major daily paper in Indianapolis. Soon thereafter the trustees of Central Newspapers, Inc., the owner of the Star and other newspapers in Indiana and Arizona, began investigating the sale of the small chain to a larger entity.

=== Cerberus Capitol Management ===
Cerberus Capital Management, L.P. is an American global alternative investment firm with assets across credit, private equity, and real estate strategies. The firm is based in New York City, and run by Steve Feinberg, who co-founded Cerberus in 1992, with William L. Richter, who serves as a senior managing director. The firm has offices in the United States, Europe and Asia. Cerberus has around US$60 billion under management in funds and accounts.

Dan Quayle is the chair of the company and plays a central role.

== Members ==
=== Immediate members ===
James C. Quayle was born on May 25, 1921, and died July 7, 2000 (aged 79). He was the father of Vice President Dan Quayle.

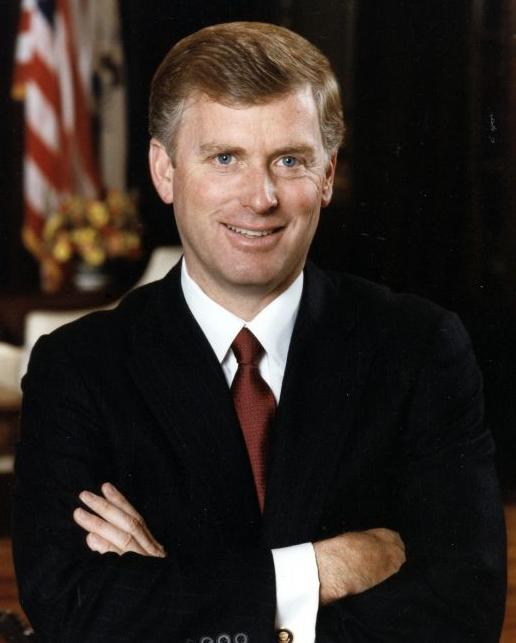
Dan Quayle Portrait

Dan Quayle was born on February 4, 1947. He served in the United States House of Representatives, the United States Senate and as Vice President of the United States under George H. W. Bush.

Ben Quayle was born on November 5, 1976. He served in the United States House of Representatives from Arizona, serving in the 3rd District.

Corinne Quayle was born on November 27, 1978, she is the daughter of Dan and Marilyn Quayle.

Tucker Quayle was born during 1974, he is the oldest child of his parents Dan and Marilyn Quayle.

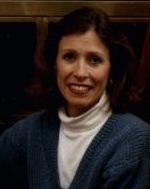
Marilyn Quayle Portrait.

=== Connected members ===
Marilyn Quayle was born on July 29, 1949, and is married to Dan Quayle since 1972. She served as Second Lady of the United States from 1989 to 1993.

Eugene S. Pulliam was born on September 7, 1914, and died on January 20, 1999. He was a wealthy and influential publishing magnate who founded Central Newspapers, Inc., and owned more than a dozen major newspapers, such as The Arizona Republic and The Indianapolis Star. He was the grandfather of U.S. Vice President Dan Quayle.

Eugene Collins Pulliam was born on May 3, 1889, and died on June 23, 1975. He was an American newspaper publisher and businessman who was the founder and president of Central Newspapers Inc., a media holding company. During his sixty-three years as a newspaper publisher, Pulliam acquired forty-six newspapers across the United States.

Myrta Pulliam was born on June 20, 1947, and is an American Journalist. Pulliam worked on a 1974 Star series that uncovered "local police corruption and dilatory law enforcement, resulting in a cleanup of both the Police Department and the office of the County Prosecutor." It was awarded the Pulitzer Prize for Local Investigative Specialized Reporting, in 1975.

Martha Pulliam was born in the year 1922 and died on November 27, 2014. She was the mother of United States Vice President Dan Quayle.

== Politics and legacy ==
James Danforth Quayle served as the 44th vice president of the United States from 1989 to 1993 under President George H. W. Bush. A member of the Republican Party, Quayle represented Indiana in the U.S. House of Representatives from 1977 to 1981 and in the U.S. Senate from 1981 to 1989. Marilyn Tucker Quayle is an American lawyer and novelist. She is married to the 44th vice president of the United States, Dan Quayle, and served as the second lady of the United States from 1989 until 1993. Benjamin Eugene Quayle is an American lawyer and politician who is a former U.S. representative for Arizona's 3rd congressional district.

=== Members involved with politics ===
==== Dan Quayle ====
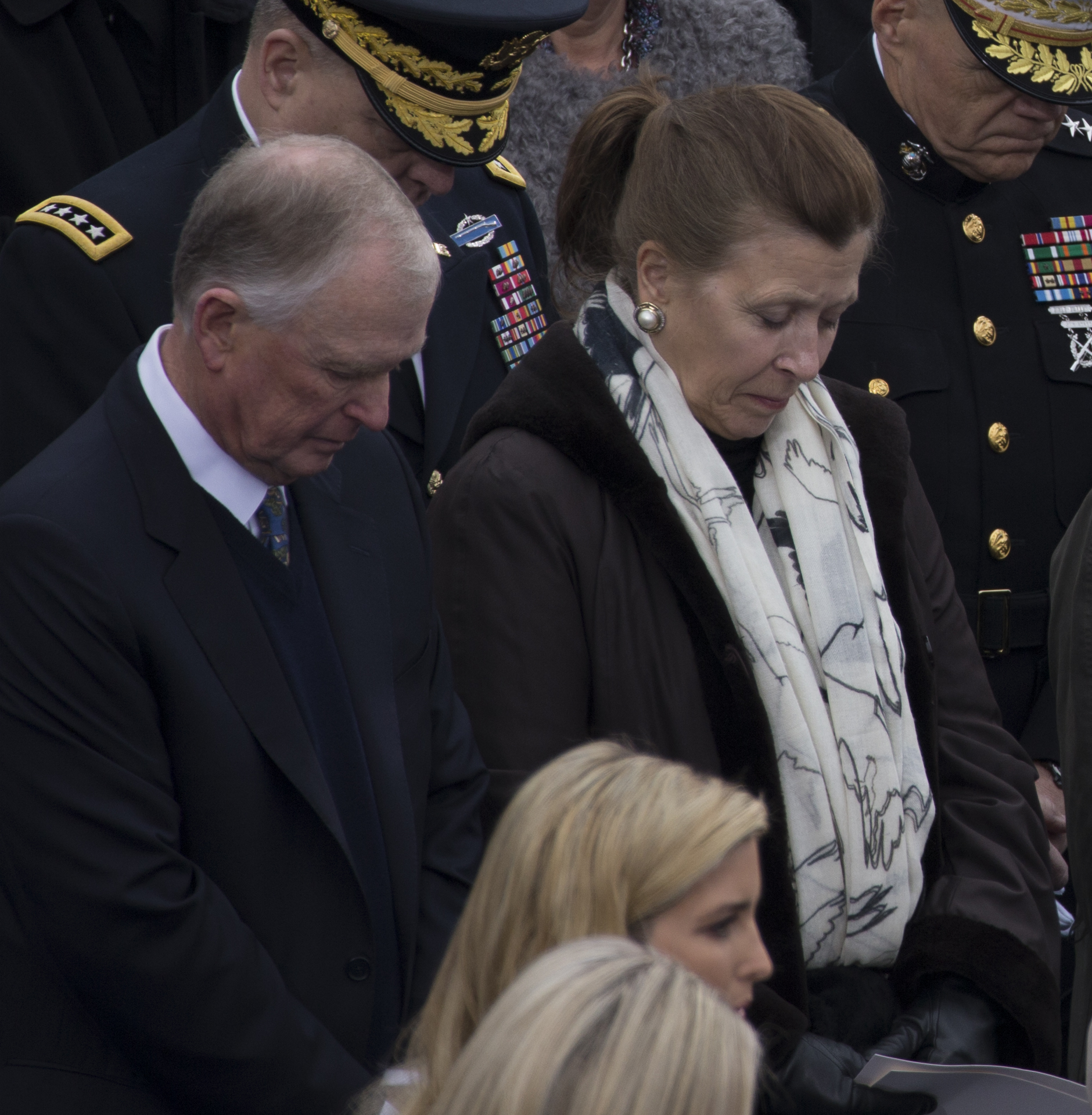
Dan and Marilyn Quayle at Trump's, 2017 Inauguration.

Quayle began his political career in 1976 by unseating incumbent Democratic representative J. Edward Roush. He won a second term against John D. Walda. After serving two terms in the House, Quayle upset three-term incumbent Democratic senator Birch Bayh as part of a Republican landslide. In 1986, he won a second term in a landslide victory against Jill Long.

In 1988, Quayle was chosen by then-vice president George H. W. Bush to serve as his running mate in the 1988 presidential election. Quayle and Bush won the election, defeating Democrats Massachusetts governor Michael Dukakis and Texas senator Lloyd Bentsen, taking office on January 20, 1989. He and Bush ran for reelection but were defeated in the 1992 presidential election by Arkansas governor Bill Clinton and Tennessee senator Al Gore. Quayle considered a presidential bid in 1996 before unsuccessfully seeking the Republican nomination in 2000.

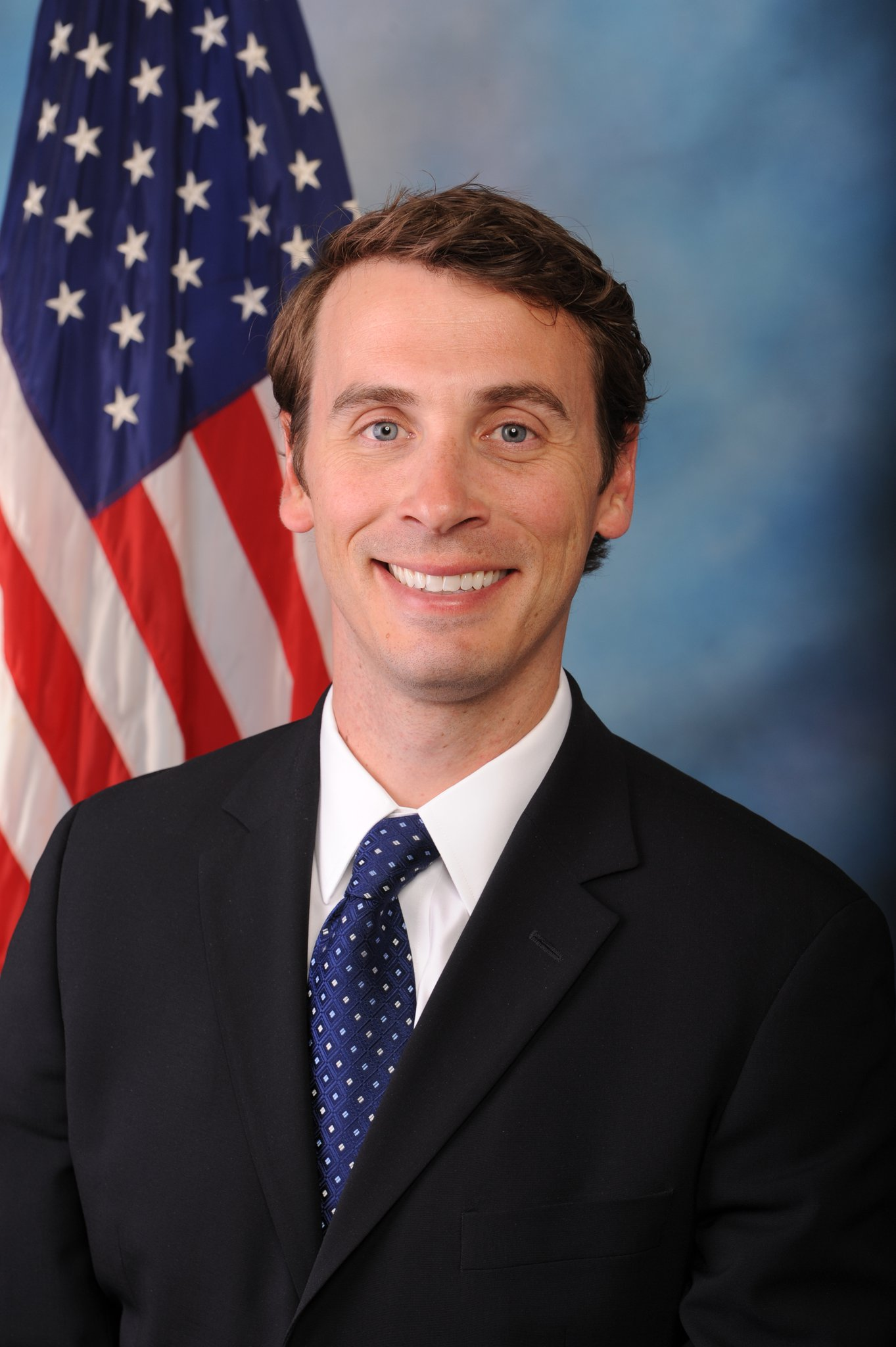
Benjamin Quayle, Official Portrait

==== Marilyn Quayle ====
In 1988, Dan was elected Vice President on George H. W. Bush's ticket. Throughout her husband's political career, Marilyn was "always her husband's closest and most candid advisor." She campaigned independently during the presidential campaign. During the 1988 campaign, she was often portrayed in the press as smart, cold, and tough – the power behind her husband. But as second lady, she played a mostly traditional role as hostess, while being an active and involved mother to their three young children. She also worked for causes such as early diagnosis of breast cancer (her mother died of breast cancer at the age of 56). With her sister Nancy, she also published a novel, Embrace the Serpent, a thriller about the wife of a vice president.

==== Benjamin Quayle ====
Before serving in Congress, Quayle worked as an associate lawyer and founded a security company. In the 2010 Republican primary he defeated 10 other candidates before winning the general election. In his first bid for reelection, two years later and after redistricting, he faced a Republican challenge from fellow Representative David Schweikert and narrowly lost the seat in the primary.

=== Learning Center ===
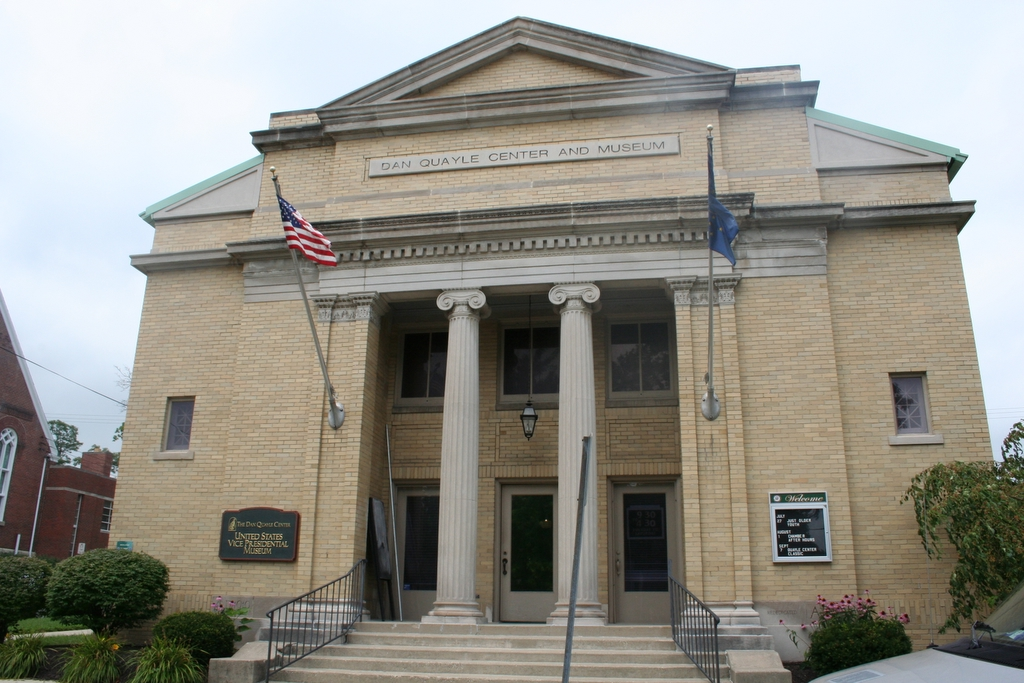
Dan Quayle Center and Museum.

The Quayle Vice Presidential Learning Center, commonly referred to as the Dan Quayle Museum, is located at 815 Warren Street in Huntington, Indiana, where former Vice President Dan Quayle attended high school. The center is downtown in a renovated church, the former First Church of Christ, Scientist, and has two floors. The first floor features the history of all the vice presidents of the United States, while the second floor houses memorabilia and a theater. Regular school programs are held. It is located in the Old Plat Historic District.

The Dan Quayle Center and Museum was opened to the public on June 17, 1993, and officially dedicated on October 16, 1993. In 2002, the board of directors for the DQCF changed the name of the facility from The Dan Quayle Center and Museum to The Dan Quayle Center home of the United States Vice Presidential Museum. In 2008, the board of directors changed the name to The Quayle Vice Presidential Learning Center.

== Sources and references ==
- Family tree of Dan QUAYLE
- Généalogie de James Danforth Quayle
- Family tree of James Danforth Quayle
- Marilyn Tucker Quayle - Archives of Women's Political Communication
- Corinne Quayle, mother of former VP, dies at 92
