= James C. Quayle =

American publisher (1921–2000)

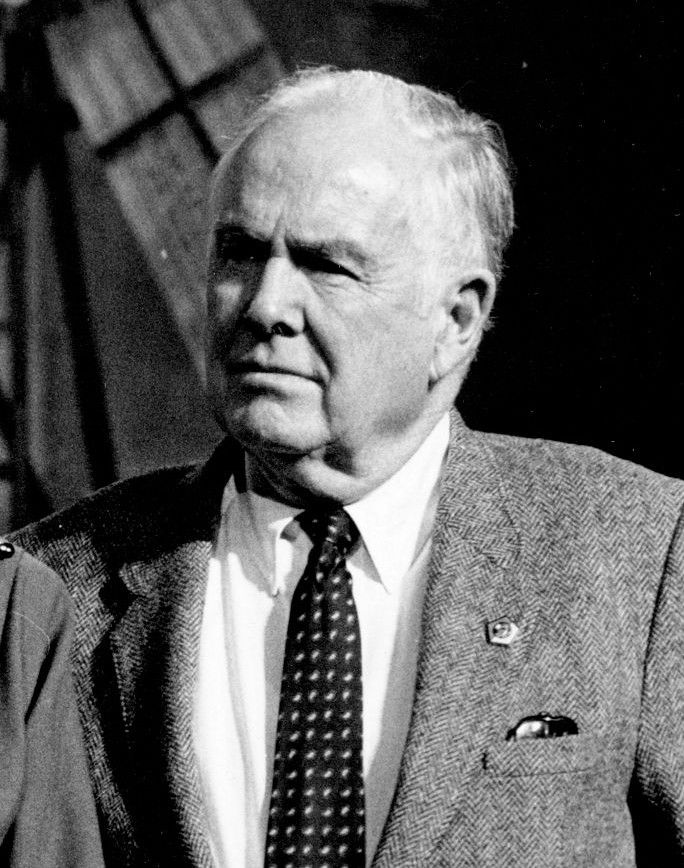
- Born: James Cline Quayle; May 25, 1921; Joliet, Illinois, U.S.
- Died: July 7, 2000 (aged 79); Sun City West, Arizona, U.S.
- Education: DePauw University
- Occupations: Newspaper publisher, businessman
- Known for: Father of Dan Quayle
- Political party: Republican
- Spouse: Martha Pulliam (m. 1943)
- Children: 4, including Dan
- Relatives: Quayle family

James Cline Quayle (May 25, 1921 – July 7, 2000) was an American newspaper publisher and businessman who owned several newspapers in the United States including the Huntington Herald-Press in Indiana and the Wickenburg Sun in Arizona. He was the father of Dan Quayle, the 44th vice president of the United States.

== Background ==
Quayle was born in Joliet, Illinois, the son of Robert H. and Marie Cline Quayle. He attended DePauw University, where he was a member of Delta Kappa Epsilon. After graduating in 1943, Quayle joined the United States Marine Corps and served in an air transport wing in the Pacific Theater during World War II.

After the war, Quayle married Corinne Pulliam, the daughter of wealthy newspaper publisher Eugene C. Pulliam, at Indiana University. Their marriage united two families that shared a strong passion for the newspaper business. Pulliam is the daughter of Eugene C. Pulliam, former owner of The Indianapolis Star and The Indianapolis News and the half-sister of Eugene S. Pulliam, for whom the school of journalism at Butler University is named. The couple had four children, including future Indiana Senator and U.S. Vice President James Danforth "Dan" Quayle, named after one of the elder Quayle's wartime comrades and fraternity brother.

== Career ==
James Quayle entered the newspaper business serving as an advertising salesman for several Pulliam-owned newspapers in Indiana and Ohio before joining the Huntington Herald-Press in Huntington, Indiana in 1948. In 1955, Quayle moved his family to Arizona to manage public relations operations at The Arizona Republic and the Phoenix Gazette.

In 1963, Quayle became the publisher of the Huntington Herald-Press. He purchased the newspaper the following year and became chairman of Huntington Newspapers, Inc. He was publisher of that newspaper from 1963 to 1990, except for six years when he was publisher of the Muncie Star and Evening Press, beginning in 1972.

== Death ==
After retiring, Quayle lived in Wickenburg, Arizona. He died at a care facility in Sun City West, Arizona, on July 7, 2000, at the age of 79.
