= Ben Quayle =

American lawyer and politician (born 1976)

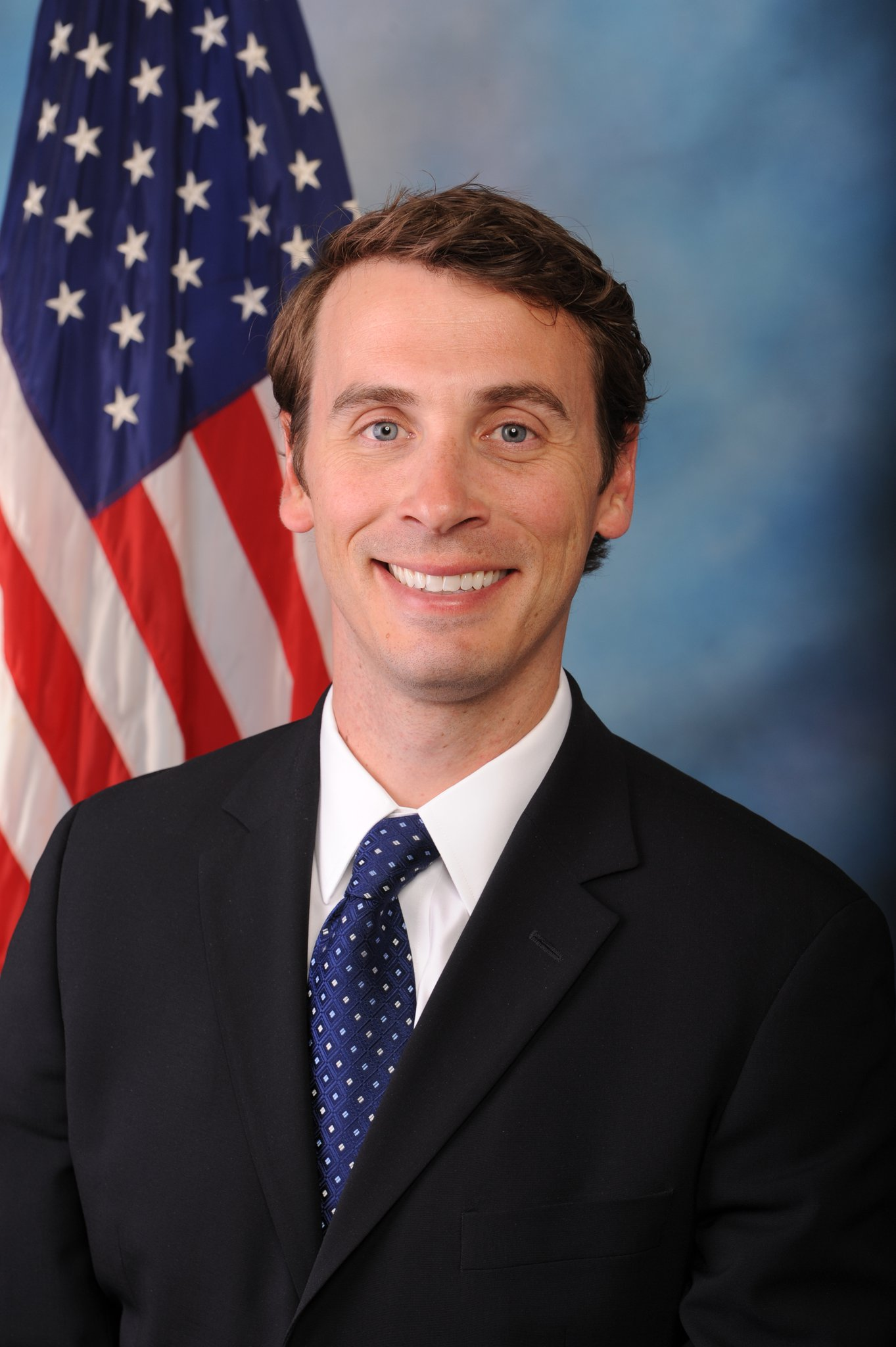
- Official portrait, 2011

Member of the U.S. House of Representatives from Arizona's 3rd district
- In office January 3, 2011 – January 3, 2013
- Preceded by: John Shadegg
- Succeeded by: David Schweikert (redistricted)

Personal details
- Born: Benjamin Eugene Quayle; November 5, 1976 (age 50) Fort Wayne, Indiana, U.S.
- Party: Republican
- Spouse: Tiffany Crane (m. 2010)
- Children: 2
- Parent(s): Dan Quayle (father); Marilyn Quayle (mother)
- Relatives: Quayle family
- Education: Duke University (BA); Vanderbilt University (JD)

Benjamin Eugene Quayle (born November 5, 1976) is an American lawyer and politician who is a former U.S. representative for Arizona's 3rd congressional district. A member of the Republican Party, he is the son of the 44th vice president of the United States, Dan Quayle.

Before serving in Congress, Quayle worked as an associate lawyer and founded a security company. In the 2010 Republican primary he defeated 10 other candidates before winning the general election. In his first bid for reelection, two years later and after redistricting, he faced a Republican challenge from fellow Representative David Schweikert and narrowly lost the seat in the primary.

After leaving Congress, Quayle joined the lobbying firm Clark Hill in Washington D.C. He now works for advocacy firm Venture Government Strategies (formerly Hobart Hallaway Quayle).

== Early life, education, and career ==
Quayle was born in Fort Wayne, Indiana, on November 5, 1976, three days after his father was first elected to the United States House of Representatives. As a child, Quayle occasionally visited the White House with his family during the Reagan administration while his father served as a U.S. senator.

Quayle moved to the Phoenix, Arizona area with his family in 1996. He graduated from Duke University in 1998 with a Bachelor of Arts degree in history and earned his Juris Doctor from Vanderbilt University Law School in 2002. Quayle has been admitted to the Arizona, New York, and California bar.

Quayle worked as an associate lawyer at Schulte Roth & Zabel from 2004 to 2005, and Snell & Wilmer from 2006 to 2007. In 2007 Quayle founded Tynwald Capital, a firm specializing in the acquisition and nurturing of small businesses. He was a founding member of APG-Southwest, a full-service provider of security services for businesses, for which he served as the managing partner of its Arizona branch.

In 2022, Politico reported that he was lobbying for LIV Golf, a golf tour backed by Saudi Arabia.

== U.S. House of Representatives (2011-2013) ==
=== Elections ===
2010

Quayle was a member of the Tea Party movement, which had many of its members swept into office during the 2010 elections. After Republican Congressman John Shadegg decided to retire, Quayle launched his campaign following his father's announcement on America Live with Megyn Kelly that Ben was a candidate for Arizona's 3rd congressional district. On August 11, 2010, Quayle released an advertisement in which he called Barack Obama the "worst President in history".

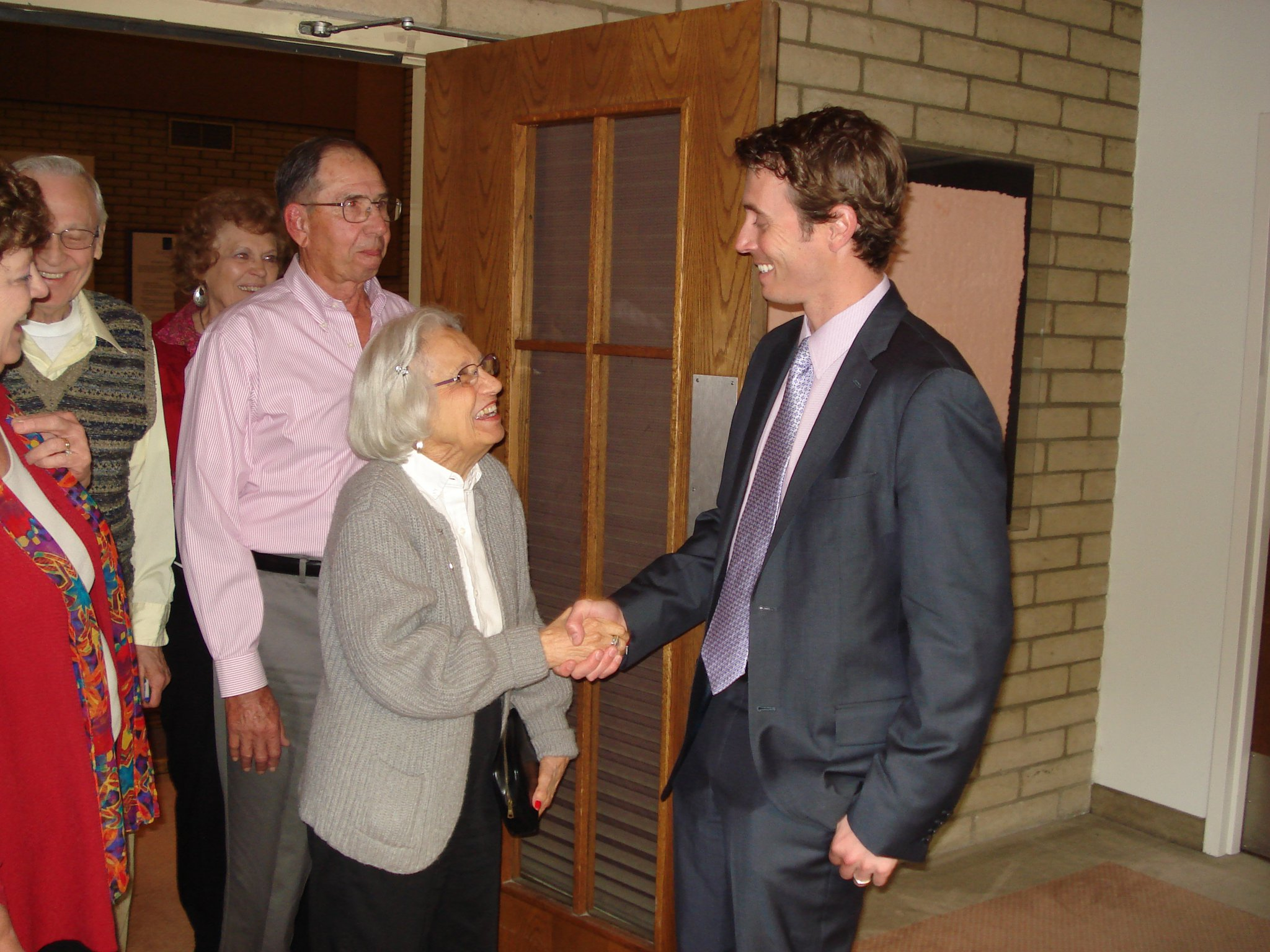
Quayle greeting supporters

Quayle's prior involvement with the controversial rumor and gossip website "DirtyScottsdale.com" complicated his run for office. According to the site's founder, Quayle was one of the "original contributors" to the site, which covered Scottsdale nightlife with features including sexy photos of women, and was the predecessor to the gossip website TheDirty.com. Quayle initially denied the rumors, before admitting several weeks later that he did, in fact, write material for the site under the pen name Brock Landers.

Quayle won the 10-candidate Republican primary on August 24, 2010, with a plurality of 23% of the vote. In the general election in November, Quayle defeated Democratic candidate Jon Hulburd 52–41%.

2012

Schweikert: 50–60%; 60–70%; 70–80%; Quayle: 50–60%; 60–70%

After redistricting, Quayle's district was renumbered the 6th district, while his home in Phoenix was drawn into the 9th district. But Quayle's home was just a few yards outside the 6th, leading a source close to Quayle to tell National Journal that Quayle would run in his original district. While the 6th is as heavily Republican as its predecessor, the 9th was drawn as a fair-fight district.

On February 6, 2012, Quayle confirmed that he would run in the 6th. He faced fellow freshman Republican Congressman David Schweikert in the Republican primary—the real contest in this heavily Republican district. In an unusual twist, Schweikert's home in Fountain Hills had been drawn into the 6th, while Quayle's home had been drawn into the 9th, the geographic successor to Schweikert's 5th.

During the bitter primary campaign, Schweikert was widely criticized for a mailer that accused Quayle of "going both ways", suggesting that he was bisexual. On the reverse, the mailer listed issues on which it claimed Quayle had taken both liberal and conservative positions. Senator Jon Kyl, who represented what is now the 6th from 1987 to 1995 (when it was numbered as the 4th district) said that "such campaign tactics insult the voters, degrade politics and expose those who stoop to them as unworthy of high office" and Senator John McCain said the mailer was one of the "worst that I have seen" and that it "crosses the boundary of decent political dialogue and discourse". Quayle's spokeswoman called the mailer "utterly false" and "a sleazy smear tactic". Schweikert's spokesman responded that people "should get their minds out of the gutter" because the mailer was "obviously" referring to "both ways—as in liberal and conservative". The Arizona Republic asked two political scientists to review the mailer, who both said that they had "never seen anybody accuse someone of flip-flopping [on political issues] that way" and said it was "difficult to believe" that the sexual suggestion was unintentional.

Although the 6th contained almost two-thirds of Quayle's constituents, Schweikert defeated Quayle in the Republican primary with 51% of the vote. Matt Jette, a business professor at the Thunderbird School of Global Management who ran for governor of Arizona as a Republican in 2010, won the Democratic nomination. Schweikert defeated Jette in the November 6 general election with 62% of the vote.

=== Tenure ===
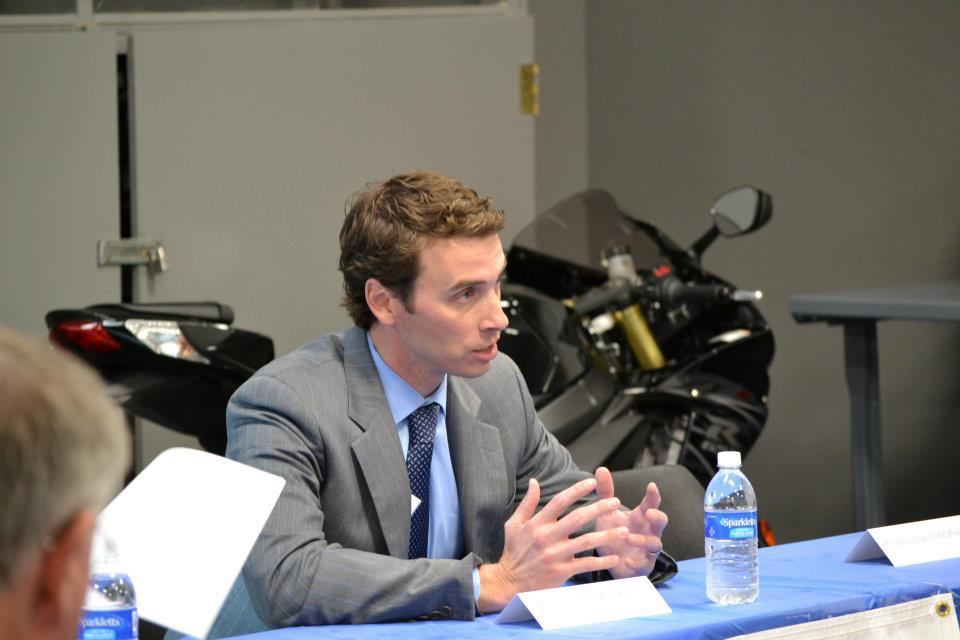
Quayle being interviewed

After being elected to Congress, Quayle announced that he would opt out of the taxpayer-funded congressional health care and pension plan.

In 2012 Quayle was named "The Most Conservative Member of the House of Representatives" by the National Journal. He was awarded the 2011 "National Taxpayers’ Friend Award" by the National Taxpayers Union, the "Spirit of Enterprise Award" by the U.S. Chamber of Commerce, and was given a 98% scorecard by the Club for Growth.

Controversy arose after a bill to increase combat pay for military personnel was rejected, and Quayle and David Schweikert high-fived, happy about the bill's failure. After the incident, Maria Meacham, the mother of an active-duty soldier upset about the vote, began shouting from the gallery, and was removed by security.

Quayle introduced legislation related to border security, guns, small business, government transparency, and health care and successfully sponsored H.R. 3862, the Sunshine for Regulatory Decrees and Settlements Act "to impose certain limitations on consent decrees and settlement agreements by agencies that require the agencies to take regulatory action in accordance with the terms thereof, and for other purposes". According to the Congressional Budget Office, "Under the bill, complaints against federal agencies, the terms of the consent decrees or settlement agreements, and the award of attorneys’ fees would need to be published in an accessible manner, including electronically. The legislation would require that any proposed consent decree or settlement agreement be published in the Federal Register for 60 days of public comment prior to filing with the court."

=== Committee assignments ===
Quayle served on the following committees during his tenure.

- Committee on Homeland Security
  - Subcommittee on Border and Maritime Security (Vice Chair)
  - Subcommittee on Counterterrorism and Intelligence
- Committee on the Judiciary
  - Subcommittee on Courts, Commercial and Administrative Law
  - Subcommittee on Intellectual Property, Competition, and the Internet (Vice Chair)
- Committee on Science, Space and Technology
  - Subcommittee on Research and Science Education
  - Subcommittee on Technology and Innovation (Chair)

== Personal life ==
Quayle married his wife, Tiffany Crane, in 2010. The couple have two children.

== Electoral history ==
Arizona's 3rd congressional district Republican primary results, 2010
Party	Candidate	Votes	%
Republican	Ben Quayle	17,400	22.1
Republican	Steve Moak	14,211	18.0
Republican	Jim Waring	13,850	17.6
Republican	Vernon Parker	13,411	17.0
Republican	Pamela Gorman	6,473	8.2
Republican	Paulina Morris	6,138	7.8
Republican	Sam Crump	3,886	4.9
Republican	Ed Winkler	1,353	1.7
Republican	Bob Branch	1,141	1.4
Republican	LeAnn Hull	1,044	1.3
Total votes		78,907	100.0

Arizona's 3rd congressional district election, 2010
Party	Candidate	Votes	%
Republican	Ben Quayle	108,689	52.2
Democratic	Jon Hulburd	85,610	41.1
Libertarian	Michael Shoen	10,478	5.0
Green	Leonard Clark	3,294	1.6
Majority		23,079	11.1
Total votes		208,071	100.0
Republican hold			

Arizona's 6th congressional district Republican primary results, 2012
Party	Candidate	Votes	%
Republican	David Schweikert (incumbent)	41,821	51.5
Republican	Ben Quayle (incumbent)	39,414	48.5
Total votes		81,235	100.0

U.S. House of Representatives
Preceded by John Shadegg	Member of the U.S. House of Representatives from Arizona's 3rd congressional district 2011–2013	Succeeded by Raúl Grijalva
U.S. order of precedence (ceremonial)
Preceded by Karan English as Former U.S. Representative	Order of precedence of the United States as Former U.S. Representative	Succeeded by Ron Barber as Former U.S. Representative
