= The Catholic Times =

The Catholic Times may refer to:

- The Catholic Times (UK and Ireland), a weekly newspaper in the United Kingdom and Ireland
- The Catholic Times (Wisconsin), a publication by the Roman Catholic Diocese of La Crosse in La Crosse, Wisconsin
- The Catholic Times, a former publication by the Roman Catholic Diocese of Columbus in Columbus, Ohio
- Catholic Times, a publication by the Roman Catholic Diocese of Springfield in Springfield, Illinois
- Catholic Times, a South Korean newspaper
