= The Times (book) =

2023 book by Adam Nagourney

- Author: Adam Nagourney
- Subject: History of journalism
- Publisher: Crown Publishing
- Publication date: 2023
- Pages: 592
- ISBN: 9780451499363

The Times: How the Newspaper of Record Survived Scandal, Scorn, and the Transformation of Journalism is a 2023 book by Adam Nagourney chronicling a history of The New York Times.
