= Tyrone Times =

Northern Irish newspaper

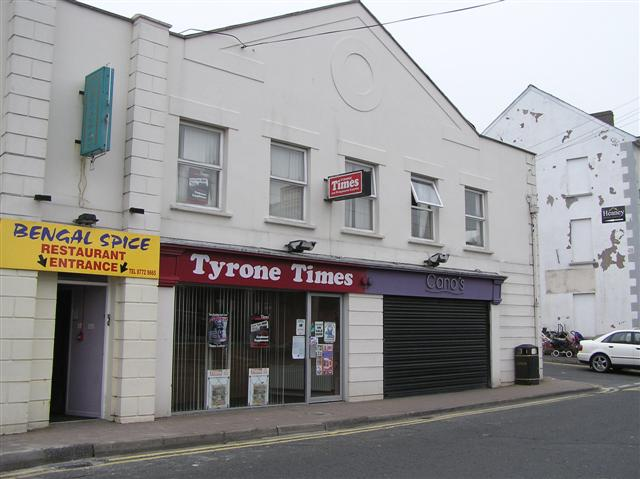
Tyrone Times offices in Dungannon.

The Tyrone Times, more correctly known as the Tyrone Times and Dungannon Gazette, was a newspaper based in Dungannon, County Tyrone, Northern Ireland. It was published by Johnston Publishing (NI), which at the time was a part of Johnston Press, which was part of JPIMedia.

The paper's name mimics the full title of its main rival, the Dungannon News and Tyrone Courier. Unlike the Courier, its name is not derived from an amalgamation of previous titles - the Times was first published in the early 1990s to build on the popularity of its sister publication in the Dungannon area, the Cookstown-based Mid Ulster Mail.

In June 2019, JPIMedia announced that they were closing the Tyrone Times.
