= New York Times Building (disambiguation) =

The New York Times Building is a skyscraper at 620 Eighth Avenue, Manhattan, New York City, that was completed in 2007.

New York Times Building may also refer to:

- New York Times Building (41 Park Row), the home of the Times from 1889 to 1903
- One Times Square or The New York Times Tower, the Times headquarters from 1903 to 1913
- 229 West 43rd Street or The New York Times Building, the Times headquarters on 43rd Street from 1913 to 2007
