= Adam Nagourney =

American journalist

Adam Nagourney (born October 10, 1954) is an American journalist who covers national politics for The New York Times. Nagourney is the author of "The Times“: How the Newspaper of Record Survived Scandal, Scorn, and the Transformation of Journalism, a history of the famous daily newspaper's recent half-century, published in 2023, by the Crown Publishing Group.

== Life and career ==
After joining The New York Times in 1996, Nagourney was assigned that year to cover the Republican Party presidential campaign of candidate, U.S. Senator Bob Dole (1923–2021), of Kansas. (who lost to incumbent Democratic 42nd President Bill Clinton of Arkansas). After that 1996 election, he became the paper's local metropolitan political correspondent in New York City. He was appointed chief political correspondent six years later in 2002, and covered the 2004 re-election campaign of 43rd President George W. Bush and the subsequent 2008 election of Illinois U. S. Senator Barack Obama as the 44th President of the United States. He became the paper's Los Angeles bureau chief in Southern California in the summer of 2010. A decade later in April 2020, he joined the paper's politics desk, helping to cover the 2020 presidential campaign for the Times. A year later in April 2021, Nagourney was named the West Coast cultural correspondent. He returned to covering national politics two years later in 2023.

On June 16, 2015, Nagourney was one of three reporters on an article published in The New York Times titled "Deaths of Irish Students in Berkeley Balcony Collapse Cast Pall on Program". The article described students in the J-1 visa program as "a source of embarrassment for Ireland". Nagourney said, "Do I think that the program – as well as the problems associated with it – are fair game for a news story? Yes. But there was a more sensitive way to tell the story. I absolutely was not looking to in any way appear to be blaming the victims, or causing pain in this awful time for their families and friends. I feel very distressed at having added to their anguish."

In 2019, Nagourney was a fellow at the USC Center for the Political Future.

== Personal life ==
Nagourney described growing up in a Jewish culture family of "passionate Times newspaper readers". His father, Herbert Nagourney, was a publisher who was a vice president at the Macmillan publishing group, before becoming president of the New York Times Book Company, (a subsidiary of The New York Times Company). His stepmother, Ann Bramson, was also a publisher of Artisan, a Workman Publishing Company imprint. His brother, Eric Nagourney, is also a journalist at the same paper of The New York Times.

Nagourney is gay.

== Works ==
- With Dudley Clendinen. Out for Good: The Struggle to Build a Gay Rights Movement in America New York: Simon and Schuster, 1999. ISBN 0-684-81091-3 ISBN 978-0-684-81091-1
- The Times: How the Newspaper of Record Survived Scandal, Scorn, and the Transformation of Journalism New York: Crown, 2023. ISBN 0-451-49936-0 ISBN 978-0-451-49936-3
