= Gainesville Times =

Gainesville Times can refer to:

- The Gainesville Sun, formerly The Gainesville Times, a Gainesville, Florida, newspaper
- The Gainesville Times (Georgia), a newspaper in Gainesville, Georgia
