= Antrim Times =

Northern Irish newspaper

The Antrim Times is a regional newspaper covering Antrim town area of Northern Ireland.

It was first published in 1985.
