= Electoral history of Dan Coats =

Elections featuring American politician

Dan Coats is a politician from the state of Indiana and a member of the Republican Party. He served four terms in the United States House of Representatives, representing Indiana's 4th congressional district from 1981 to 1989. In 1989, he was appointed to the United States Senate by Indiana Gov. Robert D. Orr following U.S. Sen. Dan Quayle's resignation from the Senate due to Quayle's election as Vice President of the United States. Coats served in the Senate from 1989 to 1999 and again from 2011 to 2017. Coats served as the 5th Director of National Intelligence from March 2017-August 2019.

== Background ==
Coats's political history in Indiana is closely tied to Quayle and former Senator Evan Bayh. Coats immediately succeeded Quayle both in the U.S. House of Representatives in 1981 (following Quayle upset victory over incumbent Sen. Birch Bayh in 1980) and in the U.S. Senate (following Quayle election as Vice President in 1988). Afters Coats decided to not seek re-election in 1998, he was succeeded by Evan Bayh, who reclaimed his father's old Senate seat. Following Bayh's retirement in 2010, Coats was re-elected to his old seat. He did not seek reelection in 2016.

== United States House of Representatives ==
1980 General Election - Indiana's 4th Congressional District
Party	Candidate	Votes	%	±%
Republican	Dan Coats	100,885	60.1	−4.3
Democratic	John D. Walda	77,542	39.1	+5.3
Independent	Stephen G. Hope	745	0.4	N/A

1982 General Election - Indiana's 4th Congressional District
Party	Candidate	Votes	%	±%
Republican	Dan Coats (I)	110,115	64.3	+3.2
Democratic	Roger M. Miller	60,054	35.1	−4.0
American	John B. Cameron Jr.	1,029	0.6	N/A

1984 General Election - Indiana's 4th Congressional District
Party	Candidate	Votes	%	±%
Republican	Dan Coats (I)	129,674	60.8	−3.5
Democratic	Michael H. Barnard	82,053	38.5	+3.4
American	John B. Cameron Jr.	858	0.4	−0.2
Libertarian	Joseph F. Laiacona	534	0.3	N/A

1986 General Election - Indiana's 4th Congressional District
Party	Candidate	Votes	%	±%
Republican	Dan Coats (I)	99,865	69.6	+8.8
Democratic	Gregory Alan Scher	43,105	30.0	−8.5
Libertarian	Stephen L. Dasbach	602	0.4	+0.1

1988 General Election - Indiana's 4th Congressional District
Party	Candidate	Votes	%	±%
Republican	Dan Coats (I)	132,843	62.1	−7.5
Democratic	Jill Long	80,915	37.9	+7.9

== United States Senate ==
1990 General Election - United States Senate Special Election in Indiana, 1990
Party	Candidate	Votes	%	±%
Republican	Dan Coats (I)	806,048	53.6	−7.0
Democratic	Baron Hill	696,639	46.4	+7.9

1992 General Election - United States Senate Election in Indiana, 1992
Party	Candidate	Votes	%	±%
Republican	Dan Coats (I)	1,267,972	57.3	+3.7
Democratic	Joe Hogsett	900,148	40.7	−5.7
Libertarian	Steve Dillon	35,733	1.6	N/A
New Alliance	Raymond Tirado	7,474	0.3	N/A

2010 Republican Primary Election - United States Senate Election in Indiana, 2010
Party	Candidate	Votes	%	+%
Republican	Dan Coats	217,225	39.4	
Republican	Marlin Stutzman	160,981	29.2	
Republican	John Hostettler	124,494	22.6	
Republican	Don Bates, Jr.	24,664	4.5	
Republican	Richard Behney	23,005	4.2	

2010 General Election - United States Senate Election in Indiana, 2010
Party	Candidate	Votes	%	±%
Republican	Dan Coats	952,116	54.6	+17.4
Democratic	Brad Ellsworth	900,148	40.0	−21.7
Libertarian	Rebecca Sink-Burris	94,330	5.4	+4.3
Independent	Jim Miller (Write-In)	161	0.01	N/A
Independent	Jack Rooney (Write-In)	99	0.01	N/A
