= Bayh =

Bayh is a surname. Notable people with the name include:

- Birch Bayh (coach) (Birch Evans Bayh Sr., 1893–1971), former American basketball and baseball coach
  - Birch Bayh (Birch Evans Bayh Jr., 1928–2019), former U.S. Senator from Indiana; son of Coach Birch Bayh and father of Evan Bayh
  - Marvella Bayh (née Hern, 1933–1979), wife of Birch Bayh and mother of Evan Bayh
    - Evan Bayh (Birch Evans Bayh III, born 1955), former U.S. Senator and Governor of Indiana; son of Birch Bayh, husband of Susan Bayh, and father of Beau Bayh
    - Susan Bayh (1959–2021), former First Lady of Indiana; wife of Evan Bayh and mother of Beau Bayh
      - Beau Bayh (Birch Evans Bayh IV, born 1995), Secretary of State-elect of Indiana
