= 1980 United States Senate election in Indiana =

- November 4, 1980
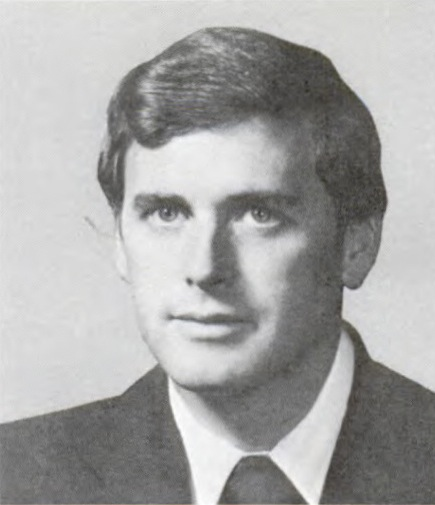

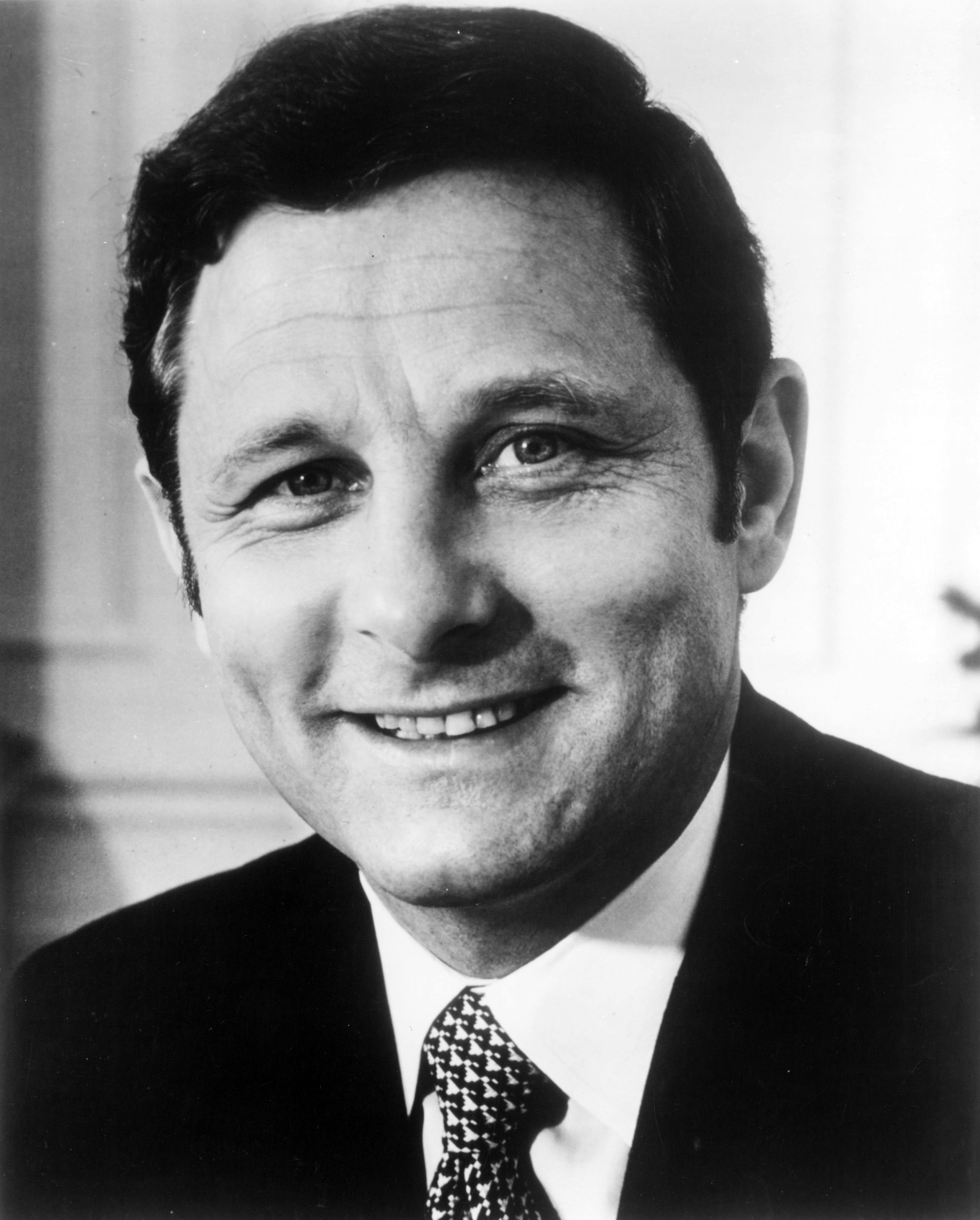
| Nominee | Dan Quayle | Birch Bayh |
| Party | Republican | Democratic |
| Popular vote | 1,182,414 | 1,015,922 |
| Percentage | 53.79% | 46.21% |
- County results Quayle: 50–60% 60–70% 70–80% Bayh: 50–60%
U.S. senator before election
Birch Bayh
Democratic
Elected U.S. Senator
Dan Quayle
Republican

The 1980 United States Senate election in Indiana took place on November 4, 1980, along with elections to the United States Senate in other states as well as the presidential election, elections to the United States House of Representatives and various state and local elections. Incumbent Democratic U.S. Senator Birch Bayh ran for a fourth term, but was defeated by Republican nominee, U.S. Representative Dan Quayle. Dan Quayle's swearing-in marked the first time since 1959 that Republicans held both United States Senate seats from Indiana.

== Republican primary ==
=== Candidates ===
- Roger F. Marsh, author and activist
- Dan Quayle, U.S. Representative

=== Results ===
Republican primary results
| Party | Candidate | Votes | % |
|---|---|---|---|
| Republican | Dan Quayle | 397,273 | 77.06% |
| Republican | Roger Marsh | 118,273 | 22.94% |

GOP primary results by county Quayle 50–60% Quayle 60–70% Quayle 70–80% Quayle 80–90% Quayle 90–100% Marsh 50–60%

== General election ==
=== Candidates ===
- Birch Bayh (D), incumbent U.S. Senator
- Dan Quayle (R), U.S. Representative

=== Campaign ===
Birch Bayh, the incumbent Senator, faced no opposition from Indiana and avoided a primary election. Bayh was originally elected in 1962 and re-elected in 1968 and 1974. He was Chairman of Senate Intelligence Committee and architect of 25th and 26th Amendments. This election was one of the key races in the country, and signaled a trend that would come to be known as Reagan's coattails, describing the influence Ronald Reagan had in congressional elections. Bayh was defeated by over 160,000 votes to Representative Dan Quayle, who would later go on to be Vice President of the United States. Bayh's own son Evan would be elected to this very same Senate seat 18 years later in 1998, after previously serving 2 terms as Governor.

=== Results ===
General election results
| Party | Candidate | Votes | % |
|---|---|---|---|
| Republican | Dan Quayle | 1,182,414 | 53.79% |
| Democratic | Birch Bayh (incumbent) | 1,015,922 | 46.21% |
| Total votes | | 2,198,366 | 100.00% |
| Republican gain from Democratic | | | |

== See also ==
- 1980 United States Senate elections
- List of United States senators from Indiana
