= Dawn Eilenberger =

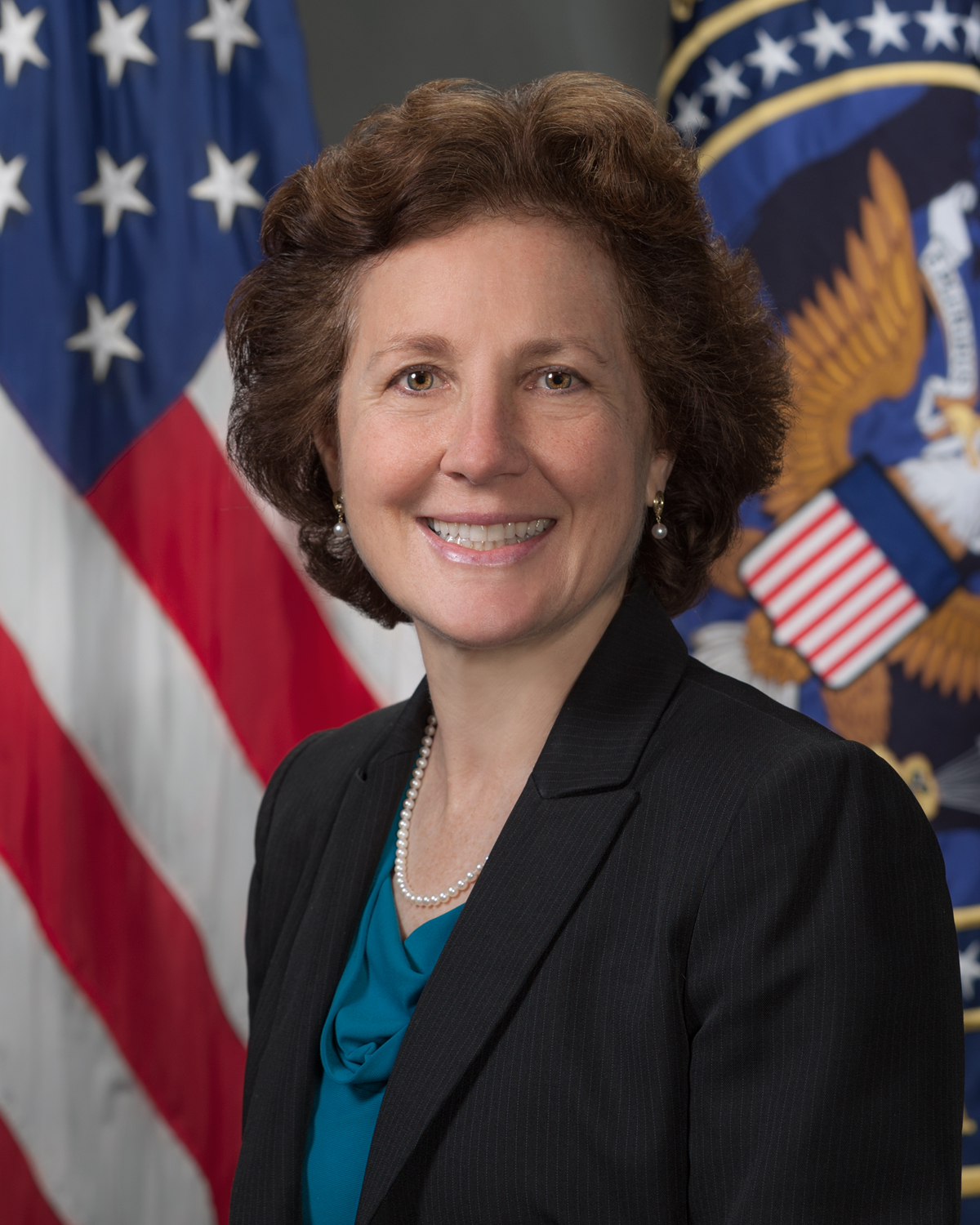

Deputy Director of National Intelligence
- In office April 2017 – February 2018
- President: Donald Trump
- Leader: Dan Coats

Dawn Eilenberger became the Deputy Director of National Intelligence in April 2017. Previously she was the Assistant Director of National Intelligence for Policy & Strategy, Office of the Director of National Intelligence (ODNI). In this role, she oversees the formulation and implementation of Intelligence community (IC)-wide policy and strategy on the full range of intelligence issues, including collection, analysis, requirements, management and information sharing, and provides leadership for ODNI and IC initiatives on information sharing and the closure and disposition of detainees at the Guantanamo Bay detention camp.

== Biography ==
Eilenberger is a native of East Stroudsburg, Pennsylvania. She graduated summa cum laude from Muhlenberg College with a B.A in history and political science and from the University of Virginia School of Law and has been admitted to practice law in Virginia and the District of Columbia.

Eilenberger began her government career in 1982 in the Central Intelligence Agency’s Office of General Counsel (OGC). In 1988, she became Chief of OGC's Special Activities Division, providing legal guidance on CIA operational activities. She became Chief of OGC's Administrative Law Division in 1992, handling appropriations law, ethics, security and human resource issues. She was named Director of the CIA's Office of Equal Employment Opportunity in 1994. She became the CIA's Principal Deputy General Counsel in August 1995, managing the day-to-day activities of OGC and providing legal advice to senior CIA officials on the full range of intelligence issues. Eilenberger served as the CIA's Director of Finance from 1999 through 2004. Her programmatic responsibilities included the Auditable Financial Statements Program, the Working Capital Fund and financial support to operational activities.

Eilenberger next served at the National Geospatial-Intelligence Agency (NGA). She was Associate Deputy Director for Policy (February 2005 – February 2006), Deputy Director, Security and Installations (March 2006 – June 2007), and Director, Office of International Affairs and Policy (June 2007 – February 2011), where she managed NGA's international partnerships and developed and implemented geospatial intelligence policy and guidance, including intelligence sharing and disaster relief efforts. She was named Inspector General of the NGA (February 2011 – August 2014), where she completed the transition of the office to a statutory IG, including creation of a financial audit staff to oversee the first audit of NGA's financial statements. As Inspector General, she provided independent oversight and accountability and acted as the NGA's chief official responsible for investigating potential violations of law, rule, or regulation.

In November 2020, Eilenberger was named a volunteer member of the Joe Biden presidential transition Agency Review Team to support transition efforts related to the United States Intelligence Community.
