= Senator Bayh =

Senator Bayh may refer to:

- Birch Bayh (1928–2019), U.S. Senator from Indiana from 1963 to 1981
- Evan Bayh (born 1955), U.S. Senator from Indiana from 1999 to 2011
