= Dan Coats =

American politician and diplomat (born 1943)

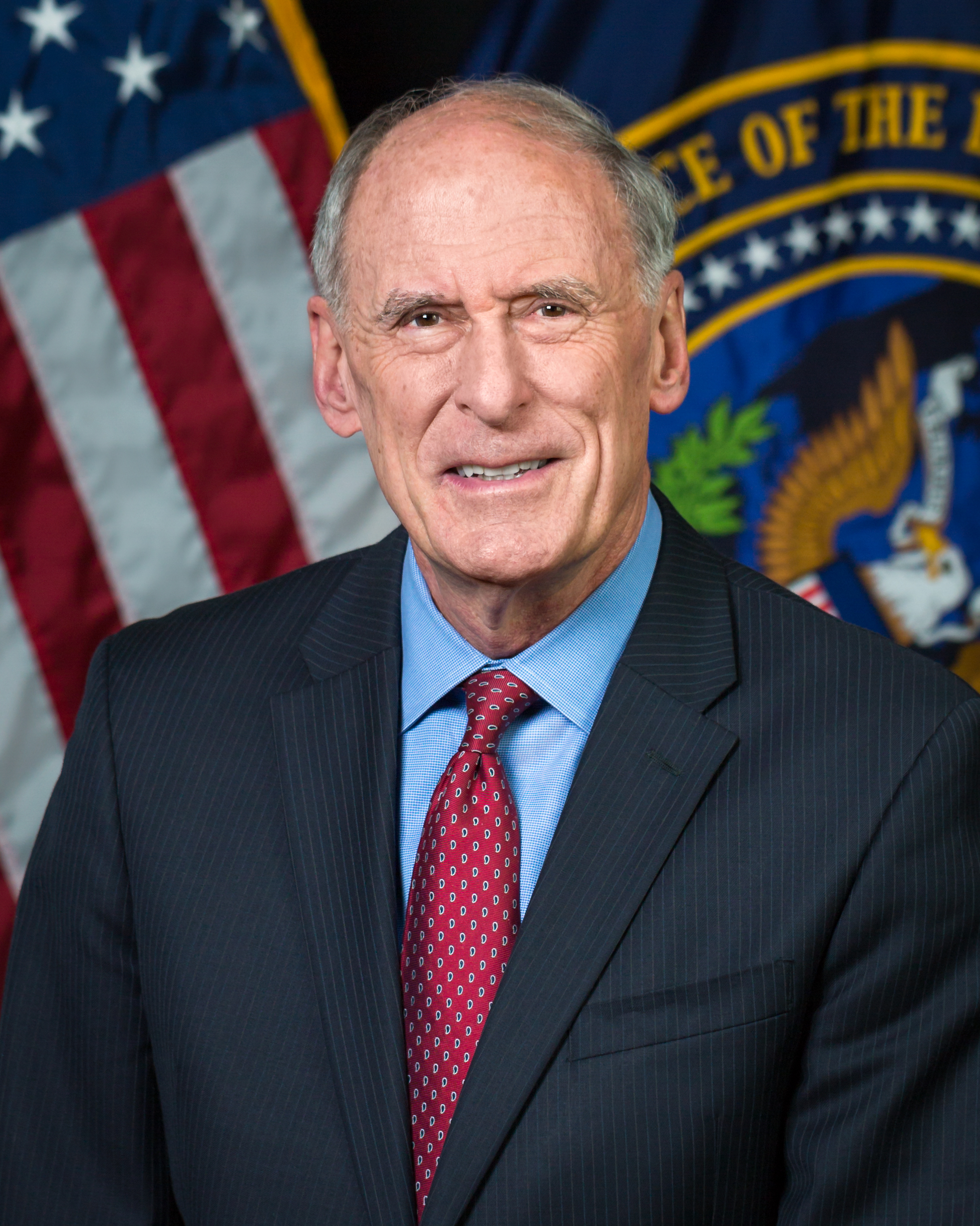
- Official portrait, 2017

5th Director of National Intelligence
- In office March 16, 2017 – August 15, 2019
- President: Donald Trump
- Deputy: Susan M. Gordon
- Preceded by: James Clapper
- Succeeded by: John Ratcliffe

Chair of the Joint Economic Committee
- In office January 3, 2015 – January 3, 2017
- Preceded by: Kevin Brady
- Succeeded by: Pat Tiberi

United States Senator from Indiana
- In office January 3, 2011 – January 3, 2017
- Preceded by: Evan Bayh
- Succeeded by: Todd Young
- In office January 3, 1989 – January 3, 1999
- Preceded by: Dan Quayle
- Succeeded by: Evan Bayh

United States Ambassador to Germany
- In office August 15, 2001 – February 28, 2005
- President: George W. Bush
- Preceded by: John C. Kornblum
- Succeeded by: William R. Timken

Member of the U.S. House of Representatives from Indiana's 4th district
- In office January 3, 1981 – January 3, 1989
- Preceded by: Dan Quayle
- Succeeded by: Jill Long Thompson

Personal details
- Born: Daniel Ray Coats; May 16, 1943 (age 83) Jackson, Michigan, U.S.
- Party: Republican
- Spouse: Marsha Coats (m. 1965)
- Children: 3
- Education: Wheaton College (BA); Indiana University, Indianapolis (JD)

Military service
- Branch/service: United States Army
- Years of service: 1966–1968
- Rank: Staff Sergeant
- Coats's voice Coats testifying on North Korea and Iran before the Senate Intelligence Committee. Recorded January 29, 2019

Daniel Ray Coats (born May 16, 1943) is an American politician, attorney, and diplomat from the state of Indiana. A Republican, Coats has served in the United States House of Representatives, in the United States Senate, as United States Ambassador to Germany, and as Director of National Intelligence.

Born in Jackson, Michigan, Coats graduated from Wheaton College in Illinois and the Indiana University School of Law – Indianapolis. He served in the U.S. Army from 1966 to 1968. Coats represented Indiana's 4th congressional district in the United States House of Representatives from 1981 to 1989. He was appointed to fill the Senate seat vacated by Dan Quayle following Quayle's election as Vice President of the United States. Coats won the 1990 special election to serve the remainder of Quayle's unexpired term, as well as the 1992 election for a full six-year term. He did not seek reelection in 1998 and was succeeded by Democrat Evan Bayh.

After retiring from the Senate, Coats served as U.S. ambassador to Germany from 2001 to 2005 and then worked as a lobbyist in Washington, D.C. He was reelected to the Senate by a large margin in 2010, succeeding Bayh, who announced his own retirement shortly after Coats declared his candidacy. Coats declined to run for reelection in 2016 and was succeeded by Todd Young. He was nominated as Director of National Intelligence in January 2017, succeeding James R. Clapper. His term in office commenced on March 16, 2017, and ended on August 15, 2019.

== Early life and education ==
Coats was born in Jackson, Michigan, the son of Vera (Nora) Elisabeth (née Swanlund) and Edward Raymond Coats. His father was of English and German descent, and his maternal grandparents emigrated from Sweden. Coats attended local public schools, graduating from Jackson High School in 1961. He then earned a Bachelor of Arts degree in political science from Wheaton College in Wheaton, Illinois. Coats received a Juris Doctor from Indiana University Robert H. McKinney School of Law in 1971.

== Career ==
Coats served in the United States Army Corps of Engineers from 1966 to 1968. He also served as assistant vice president of a Fort Wayne life insurance company. In the 1970s, Coats worked as a staffer for then-U.S. Rep. Dan Quayle, a Republican.

=== U.S. House of Representatives (1981–1988) ===
When Quayle ran for U.S. Senate in 1980, Coats ran for and won Quayle's seat in the U.S. House. He was reelected four times from this Fort Wayne-based district, usually without serious difficulty.

=== U.S. Senate (1988–1998; 2011–2016) ===
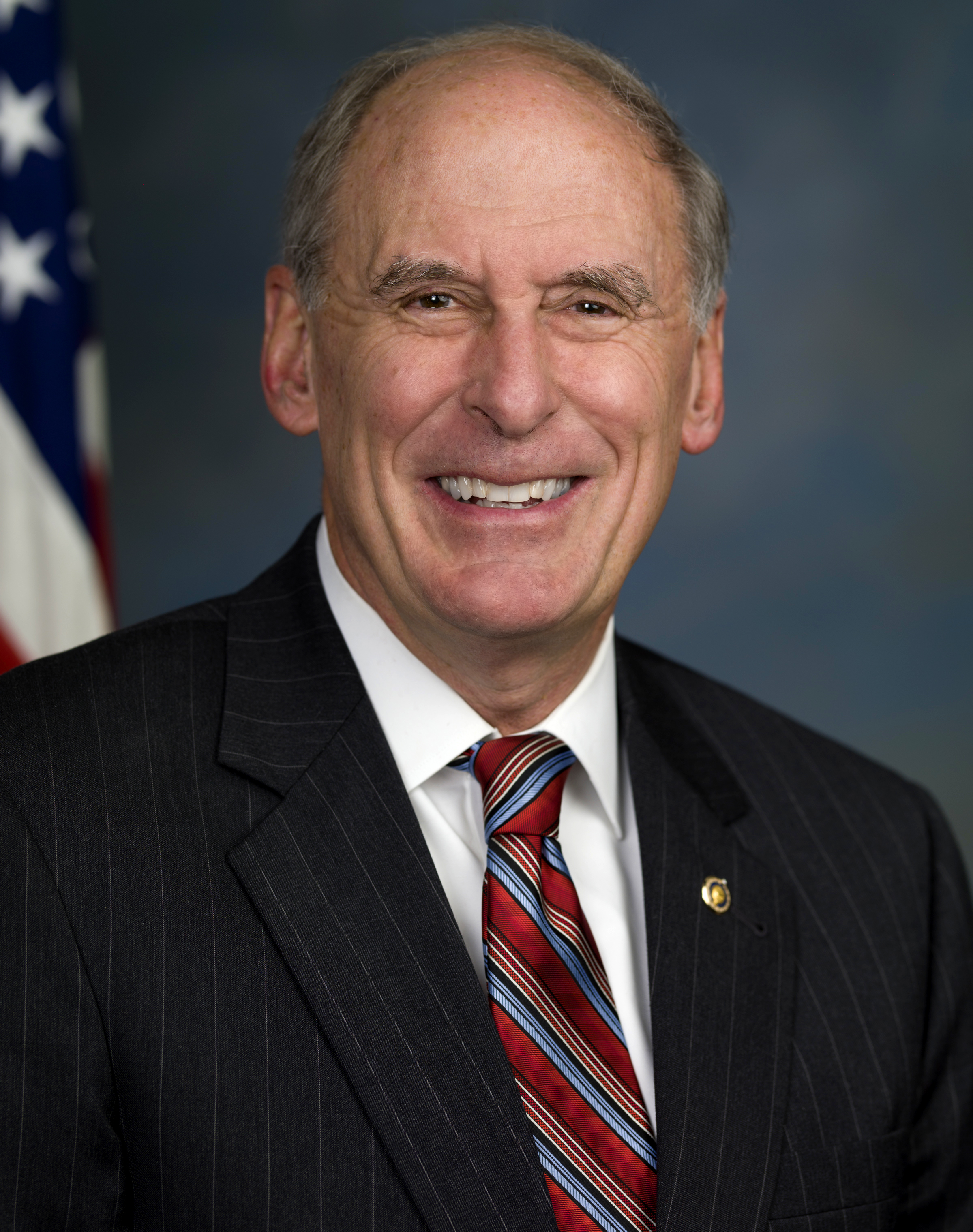
Official Senate portrait, 2011

When Quayle resigned from the Senate after being elected Vice President of the United States in 1988, Coats, who had just been elected to a fifth term in the House, was appointed to Quayle's former seat. He subsequently won a special election in 1990 for the balance of Quayle's second term, and was elected to a full term in 1992. Coats declined to run for a second full term in 1998. He served in the Senate until January 1999, at which time he was succeeded by Evan Bayh.

On February 10, 2010, Coats confirmed that he would return to Indiana to run for the seat held by incumbent Evan Bayh in the 2010 United States Senate election. Bayh had made no previous announcements and was fully expected to run for another term, but after Coats announced his candidacy, Bayh announced his retirement on February 15, 2010. On May 4, 2010, Coats won the Republican primary over State Senator Marlin Stutzman and former U.S. Representative John Hostettler.. He served on the United States Senate Select Committee on Intelligence.

Coats defeated Democratic U.S. Representative Brad Ellsworth by a 15-point margin to return to the Senate. Coats became the senior senator from Indiana after Richard Lugar lost a challenge in the 2012 Republican primary election and subsequently was not re-elected to the Senate in 2012. Coats served the remainder of his term with Democrat Joe Donnelly.

=== Private sector (1998–2001) ===
Coats worked as special counsel member in the firm Verner, Liipfert, Bernhard, McPherson and Hand in 2000 and 2001. In 2001, Coats was reportedly one of George W. Bush's top choices to be secretary of defense, a job eventually given to Donald Rumsfeld who had previously held the post under President Gerald Ford.

=== US Ambassador to Germany (2001–2005) ===
From August 15, 2001, to February 28, 2005, Coats was George W. Bush's ambassador to Germany. As ambassador during the lead-up to the Iraq War, he unsuccessfully pressured the Government of Germany led by Chancellor Gerhard Schröder not to oppose the war, threatening worsened U.S. relations with Germany. As Ambassador he also played a critical role in establishing robust relations with then opposition leader Angela Merkel, who approved the Iraq war, and in the construction of a new United States Embassy in the heart of Berlin next to the Brandenburg Gate.

=== Again in private life (2005–2010) ===
Coats served as co-chairman of the Washington government relations office of King & Spalding.

In 2005, Coats drew attention when he was chosen by President George W. Bush to shepherd Harriet Miers's failed nomination to the Supreme Court through the Senate. Echoing Senator Roman Hruska's famous 1970 speech in defense of Harrold Carswell, Coats said to CNN regarding the nomination: "If [being a] great intellectual powerhouse is a qualification to be a member of the court and represent the American people and the wishes of the American people and to interpret the Constitution, then I think we have a court so skewed on the intellectual side that we may not be getting representation of America as a whole."

In 2007, Coats served as co-chairman of a team of lobbyists for Cooper Industries, a Texas corporation that moved its principal place of business to Bermuda, where it would not be liable for U.S. taxes. In that role, he worked to block Senate legislation that would have closed a tax loophole, worth hundreds of millions of dollars to Cooper Industries.

=== Director of National Intelligence (2017–2019) ===
Coats being sworn in as Director of National Intelligence by Vice President Mike Pence on March 16, 2017

On January 5, 2017, Coats was announced as then-President-elect Donald Trump's nominee for the Cabinet-level position of Director of National Intelligence, to succeed the outgoing James R. Clapper. His confirmation hearing was held on February 28, 2017, by the United States Senate Intelligence Committee, which approved his nomination on March 9, 2017, with a 13–2 vote. The Senate confirmed his nomination with an 85–12 vote on March 15, 2017, and he was sworn into office on March 16, 2017.

On July 16, 2018, Coats released a statement affirming the consensus of the United States Intelligence Community (IC) that the Russian government interfered in the 2016 U.S. presidential election, a day after the 2018 Russia–United States Summit where President Trump recanted his endorsement of the IC's assessment.

On September 6, 2018, Director Coats denied that he had authored the anonymous op-ed piece from a senior Trump administration official that criticized the President which had been published by The New York Times the day prior. The day before, MSNBC host Lawrence O'Donnell speculated that Coats was the author of the guest essay, which was later revealed to have been written by then-United States Department of Homeland Security Chief of Staff Miles Taylor.

Coats released the DNI's "Worldwide Threat Assessment of the US Intelligence Community" on January 29, 2019, listing the major threats to the United States. The reports states that the "international system is coming under increasing strain amid continuing cyber and WMD proliferation threats, competition in space, and regional conflicts. Among the disturbing trends are hostile states and actors' intensifying online efforts to influence and interfere with elections here and abroad and their use of chemical weapons. Terrorism too will continue to be a top threat to US and partner interests worldwide, particularly in Sub-Saharan Africa, the Middle East, South Asia, and Southeast Asia. (Note: Terrorists groups listed in order are Sunni Violent Extremists, ISIS, Al-Qaeda, Homegrown Violent Extremists, Shia Actors, Lebanese Hizballah, Violent Ethno-supremacist and Ultranationalist Groups (pp. 10–13).) The development and application of new technologies will introduce both risks and opportunities, and the US economy will be challenged by slower global economic growth and growing threats to U.S. economic competitiveness." In the report, Coats also highlighted the potential negative impacts to US national security as a result of climate change, with this statement: "The United States will probably have to manage the impact of global human security challenges, such as threats to public health, historic levels of human displacement, assaults on religious freedom, and the negative effects of environmental degradation and climate change."

Reporting to Congress in January 2019, the subject advised that Russia acting in concert with their allies will use novel strategies that build on their previous experience in election meddling. In July 2019, Coats appointed an election security "czar," Shelby Pierson, to oversee efforts across intelligence agencies. She is the first to have that role. Coats also directed other intelligence agencies to appoint executives to coordinate election security.

During his tenure Coats sometimes took public positions that conflicted with Trump's statements or actions. Areas of disagreement included Russia, and particularly Russia's interference in the 2016 election, as well as North Korea and Iran. On July 28, 2019, following multiple anonymous reports that he was about to be let go, Trump announced on Twitter that Coats would depart on August 15 and that he would nominate U.S. Representative John Ratcliffe (R-Texas) to replace him as Director of National Intelligence.

== Political positions ==
=== Gun laws ===
On multiple occasions, Coats has supported gun control measures. In 1991, he voted in favor of the Biden-Thurmond Violent Crime Control Act. This act, which did not become law, would have created a waiting period for handgun purchases and placed a ban on assault weapons. Subsequently, he supported the Brady Handgun Violence Prevention Act that President Clinton signed into law in 1993. The legislation imposed a waiting period before a handgun could be transferred to an individual by a licensed dealer, importer, or manufacturer. This waiting period ended when the computerized instant check system came online. Coats also supported Feinstein Amendment 1152 to the Violent Crime Control and Law Enforcement Act of 1993. The purpose of the Feinstein Amendment was to "restrict the manufacture, transfer, and possession of certain semiautomatic assault weapons and large capacity ammunition feeding devices".

In April 2013, Coats was one of 46 senators to vote against passage of a bill which would have expanded background checks for gun buyers. Coats voted with 40 Republicans and five Democrats to stop the passage of the bill.

=== Taxes ===
In 1995, Coats introduced S. 568: Family, Investment, Retirement, Savings, and Tax Fairness Act which would provide "family tax credits, increase national savings through individual retirement plus accounts, indexing for inflation the income thresholds for taxing social security benefits, etc". The bill did not become law.

=== LGBT issues ===
In 1993, Coats emerged as an opponent of President Clinton's effort to allow LGBT individuals to serve openly in the armed forces. Coats was one of the authors of the Don't Ask, Don't Tell policy and opposed its 2011 repeal. He does not support same-sex marriage but opposes interference with "alternative lifestyles".

=== Russia and Ukraine ===
Coats pressed President Barack Obama to punish Russia harshly for its March 2014 annexation of Crimea. For this stance, the Russian government banned Coats and several other U.S. lawmakers from traveling to Russia.

In January 2019, Coats warned against the alliance between Russia and China.

=== Iran and Iraq ===
Coats supported the 2003 invasion of Iraq on the grounds of uncovering what he believed to be Iraq's weapons of mass destruction.

Coats opposed the 2015 nuclear deal between Iran and six world powers – the U.S., U.K., Russia, France, China, and Germany. He described Iran as the foremost "state sponsor of terrorism".

During testimony before the Senate Intelligence Committee in January 2019, Coats said that Iran "continues to sponsor terrorism". According to Coats, "Iran's regional ambitions and improved military capabilities almost certainly will threaten US interests in the coming year."

=== Palestine ===
Coats co-sponsored the Taylor Force Act. The legislation proposes to stop American economic aid to the Palestinian Authority unless it stops payments to individuals who commit acts of terrorism and to the families of deceased terrorists.

In September 2016, in advance of a UN Security Council resolution 2334 condemning Israeli settlements in the occupied Palestinian territories, Coats signed an AIPAC-sponsored letter urging President Barack Obama to veto "one-sided" resolutions against Israel.

=== Other ===
Coats co-sponsored, with former senators Ted Kennedy, Christopher Dodd, and Jim Jeffords, S.2206: Coats Human Services Reauthorization Act of 1998. This bill, which was enacted into law, "amended the Head Start Act, the Low-Income Home Energy Assistance Act of 1981, and the Community Services Block Grant Act ... in order to provide an opportunity for persons with limited means to accumulate assets."

In 1996, Coats co-sponsored the Line Item Veto Act of 1996, which President Clinton signed into law. The bill allowed the President to "rewrit[e] legislation by vetoing single items of spending or specific tax breaks approved by Congress." In June 1998, The Supreme Court of the United States declared the law unconstitutional in Clinton v. City of New York in a 6–3 decision.

Coats made headlines in August 1998, when he publicly questioned the timing of President Bill Clinton's cruise missile attacks on Afghanistan and Sudan, suggesting they might be linked to the Lewinsky scandal: "While there is clearly much more we need to learn about this attack and why it was ordered today, given the president's personal difficulties this week, it is legitimate to question the timing of this action."

== Personal life ==
He is married to Marsha Coats, Indiana's woman representative to the Republican National Committee.

He received the Big Brothers Big Sisters of America's Charles G. Berwind Lifetime Achievement Award in 2012.

Coats is described as a "die-hard Chicago Cubs fan". He and Marsha Coats went to a Cubs game the day after their wedding.

== Political campaigns ==
1990 United States Senate special election results
Party	Candidate	Votes	%	±%
Republican	Dan Coats (incumbent)	806,048	53.6%	−6.93%
Democratic	Baron Hill	696,639	46.4%	+7.85%
Majority		109,409	7.28%	
Turnout		1,502,687		
Republican hold		Swing		

1992 United States Senate election in Indiana results
Party	Candidate	Votes	%
Republican	Dan Coats (incumbent)	1,267,972	57.3%
Democratic	Joseph Hogsett	900,148	40.8%
Libertarian	Steve Dillon	35,733	1.6%
New Alliance	Raymond Tirado	7,474	0.3%
No party	Write-Ins	99	0.0%
Majority		367,824	
Turnout		2,211,426	
Republican hold		Swing	

2010 Republican primary results
Party	Candidate	Votes	%
Republican	Dan Coats	217,225	39.5%
Republican	Marlin Stutzman	160,981	29.2%
Republican	John Hostettler	124,494	22.6%
Republican	Don Bates, Jr.	24,664	4.5%
Republican	Richard Behney	23,005	4.2%
Total votes		550,369	100.0%

2010 General election results
Party	Candidate	Votes	%	±%
Republican	Dan Coats	952,116	54.60%	+17.37%
Democratic	Brad Ellsworth	697,775	40.01%	−21.64%
Libertarian	Rebecca Sink-Burris	94,330	5.39%	+4.27%
Majority		254,341	14.58%	
Total votes		1,743,921	100.00%	
Republican gain from Democratic		Swing		

== See also ==
- Electoral history of Dan Coats

== Notes ==
U.S. House of Representatives
Preceded by Dan Quayle	Member of the U.S. House of Representatives from Indiana's 4th congressional district 1981–1989	Succeeded by Jill Long
Preceded by Dan Marriott	Ranking Member of the House Children Committee; 1987–1989	Succeeded by Tom Bliley
U.S. Senate
Preceded by Dan Quayle	U.S. Senator (Class 3) from Indiana; 1989–1999; Served alongside: Richard Lugar	Succeeded by Evan Bayh
Preceded by Evan Bayh	U.S. Senator (Class 3) from Indiana; 2011–2017; Served alongside: Richard Lugar, Joe Donnelly	Succeeded by Todd Young
Preceded by Kevin Brady	Chair of the Joint Economic Committee; 2015–2017	Succeeded by Pat Tiberi
Party political offices
Preceded by Dan Quayle	Republican nominee for U.S. Senator from Indiana (Class 3); 1990, 1992	Succeeded by Paul Helmke
Preceded by Marvin Scott	Republican nominee for U.S. Senator from Indiana (Class 3); 2010	Succeeded by Todd Young
Diplomatic posts
Preceded by John Kornblum	United States Ambassador to Germany; 2001–2005	Succeeded by William Timken
Government offices
Preceded by Mike Dempsey; Acting	Director of National Intelligence; 2017–2019	Succeeded by Joseph Maguire; Acting
U.S. order of precedence (ceremonial)
Preceded by Dennis DeConcini as Former U.S. Senator	Order of precedence of the United States as Former U.S. Senator	Succeeded by Sam Brownback as Former U.S. Senator
