= 1990 United States Senate special election in Indiana =

- November 6, 1990
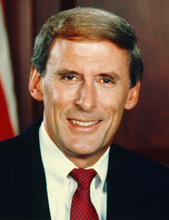

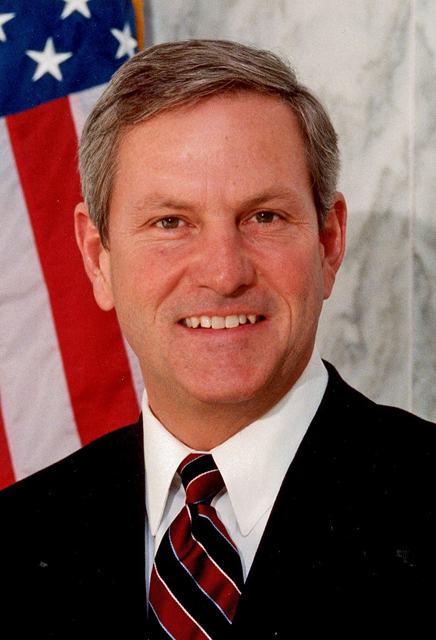
Nominee	Dan Coats	Baron Hill
Party	Republican	Democratic
Popular vote	806,048	696,639
Percentage	53.64%	46.36%
- County results Coats: 50–60% 60–70% 70–80% Hill: 50–60% 60–70%
U.S. senator before election
Dan Coats
Republican
Elected U.S. Senator
Dan Coats
Republican

The 1990 United States Senate special election in Indiana was a special election held on November 6, 1990, in order to fill Indiana's Class III Senate seat in the United States Senate. Incumbent Republican Senator Dan Coats, who was appointed to replace Dan Quayle two years prior, was challenged by Democratic nominee Baron Hill, a state representative from Seymour, Indiana won the election to serve out the remainder of the term.

== Background ==
In 1986, incumbent Senator Dan Quayle sought reelection facing Democratic challenger Jill Long and was reelected in a landslide. During the 1988 presidential election, Republican nominee George H. W. Bush selected Quayle as his running mate. The Bush-Quayle ticket defeated the Dukakis-Bentsen ticket in the general election by a 53% to 46% margin, capturing 40 states and 426 electoral votes. After being elected, Quayle resigned from the Senate. Indiana Governor Robert D. Orr appointed Representative Dan Coats of Indiana's 4th congressional district to fill the vacancy.

The 1990 election was held as part of the midterm election cycle of Republican President George H. W. Bush's term. Historically, the President's party struggles during the midterms.

== Primaries ==
- Baron Hill (Democrat), State Representative
- Dan Coats (Republican), incumbent U.S. Senator

Coats and Hill both won their respective party's nomination unopposed.

== General election ==
Coats used television commercials that raised questions about Hill's consistency in opposing new taxes, and Hill gained notoriety for walking the length of the state to meet voters.

=== Results ===
The election was held on November 6, 1990. Coats, like most incumbents in the 1990 United States Senate elections, was able to hold his seat, winning the remainder of Quayle's term.

1990 United States Senate special election in Indiana
Party	Candidate	Votes	%	±%
Republican	Dan Coats (incumbent)	806,048	53.64%	−6.93%
Democratic	Baron Hill	696,639	46.36%	+7.85%
Total votes		1,502,687	100.0%	N/A
Republican hold				

== Aftermath ==
On January 3, 1991, Coats was sworn in to the 102nd United States Congress by then–Vice President Quayle alongside his fellow Senator-elect. In the 1992 United States Senate election in Indiana, Coats was elected for a full term.
