= 1974 United States Senate election in Indiana =

- November 5, 1974
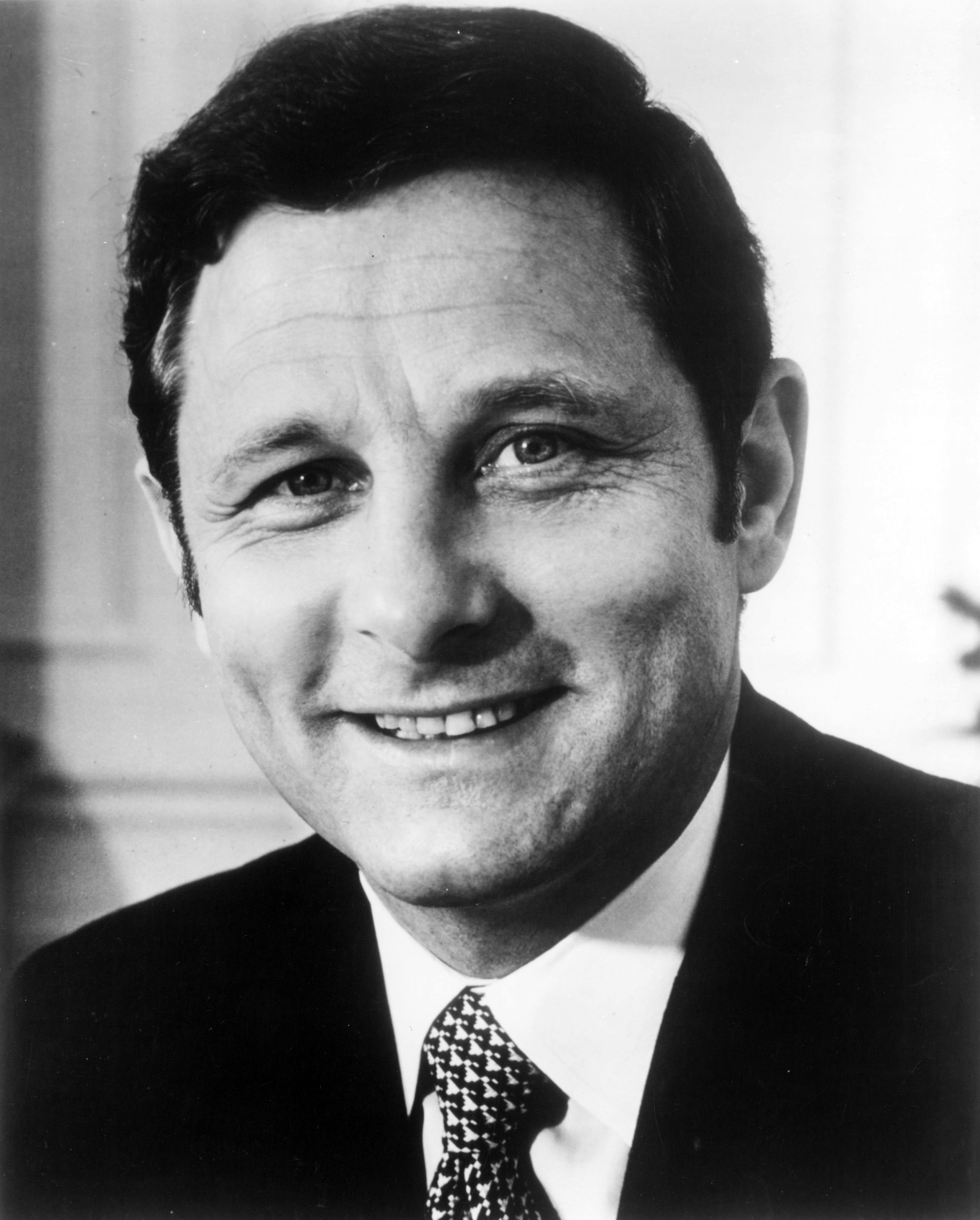

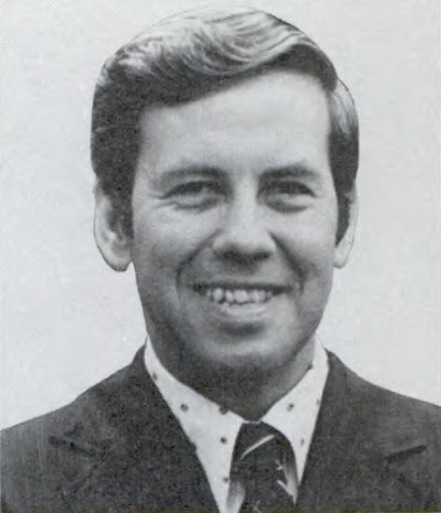
| Nominee | Birch Bayh | Richard Lugar |
| Party | Democratic | Republican |
| Popular vote | 889,269 | 814,117 |
| Percentage | 50.73% | 46.44% |
- County results Bayh: 40–50% 50–60% 60–70% Lugar: 40–50% 50–60% 60–70%
U.S. senator before election
Birch Bayh
Democratic
Elected U.S. Senator
Birch Bayh
Democratic

The 1974 United States Senate election in Indiana took place on November 5, 1974. Incumbent Democratic U.S. Senator Birch Bayh was re-elected to a third consecutive term in office, defeating Mayor of Indianapolis Richard Lugar.

Lugar would later win the state's other Senate seat in 1976 and would serve alongside Bayh until the latter's defeat in 1980. He would also serve alongside Birch's son Evan from 1999 from 2011.

== General election ==
=== Candidates ===
- Birch Bayh, incumbent U.S. Senator since 1963
- Don L. Lee
- Richard Lugar, mayor of Indianapolis since 1968

=== Results ===
1974 United States Senate election in Indiana
| Party | Candidate | Votes | % | ±% |
|---|---|---|---|---|
| Democratic | Birch Bayh (incumbent) | 889,269 | 50.73% | ▼0.92 |
| Republican | Richard Lugar | 814,117 | 46.44% | ▼1.71 |
| American Independent | Don L. Lee | 49,592 | 2.83% | N/A |
| Total votes | | 1,752,978 | 100.00% | |
| Democratic hold | | Swing | | |

== See also ==
- 1974 United States Senate elections
