= Marvella Bayh =

American political spouse

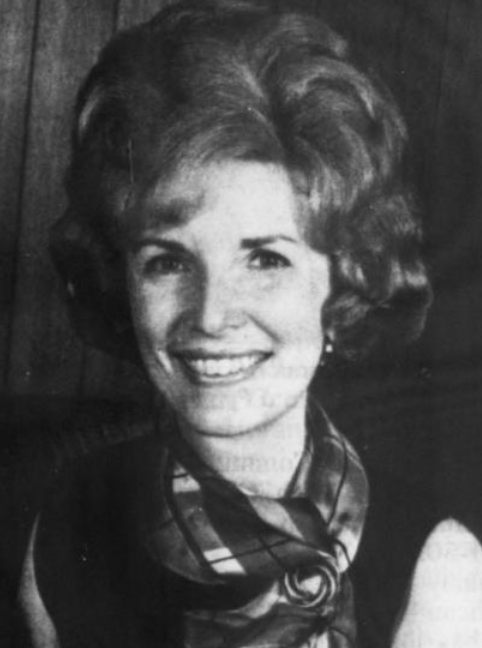
- Bayh in 1968
- Born: February 14, 1933; Lahoma, Oklahoma, U.S.
- Died: April 24, 1979 (aged 46); Bethesda, Maryland, U.S.
- Spouse: Birch Bayh (m. 1952)
- Children: Evan Bayh

Marvella Belle Hern Bayh (February 14, 1933 – April 24, 1979) was the first wife of former Indiana U.S. Senate member Birch Bayh, the mother of former Indiana U.S. Senate member Evan Bayh (Birch Evans Bayh III), and a national spokeswoman for the American Cancer Society.

== Life ==
Bayh was born in the village of Lahoma, Oklahoma, and was the daughter of Bernett E. (née Monson) and Delbert Murphy Hern. Her ancestry included Norwegian, German, and English. (Other sources say that she was born in Enid, Oklahoma.) She grew up on a farm in Oklahoma, was elected to the top position in Oklahoma Boys State and Girls State and president of Girls Nation, and attended Oklahoma State University. In 1951, she defeated her future husband in a national "outstanding young orator" competition sponsored by the National Farm Bureau. She completed her degree in education at Indiana University in 1960.

She married Birch Bayh in August 1952 and moved to Indiana. When he decided to run first for the Indiana House of Representatives in 1954 and then for the United States Senate in 1962 she began her career as a political wife. Former U.S. Senate member Bill Bradley from New Jersey described her as "a valuable and active half of the Bayh political team."

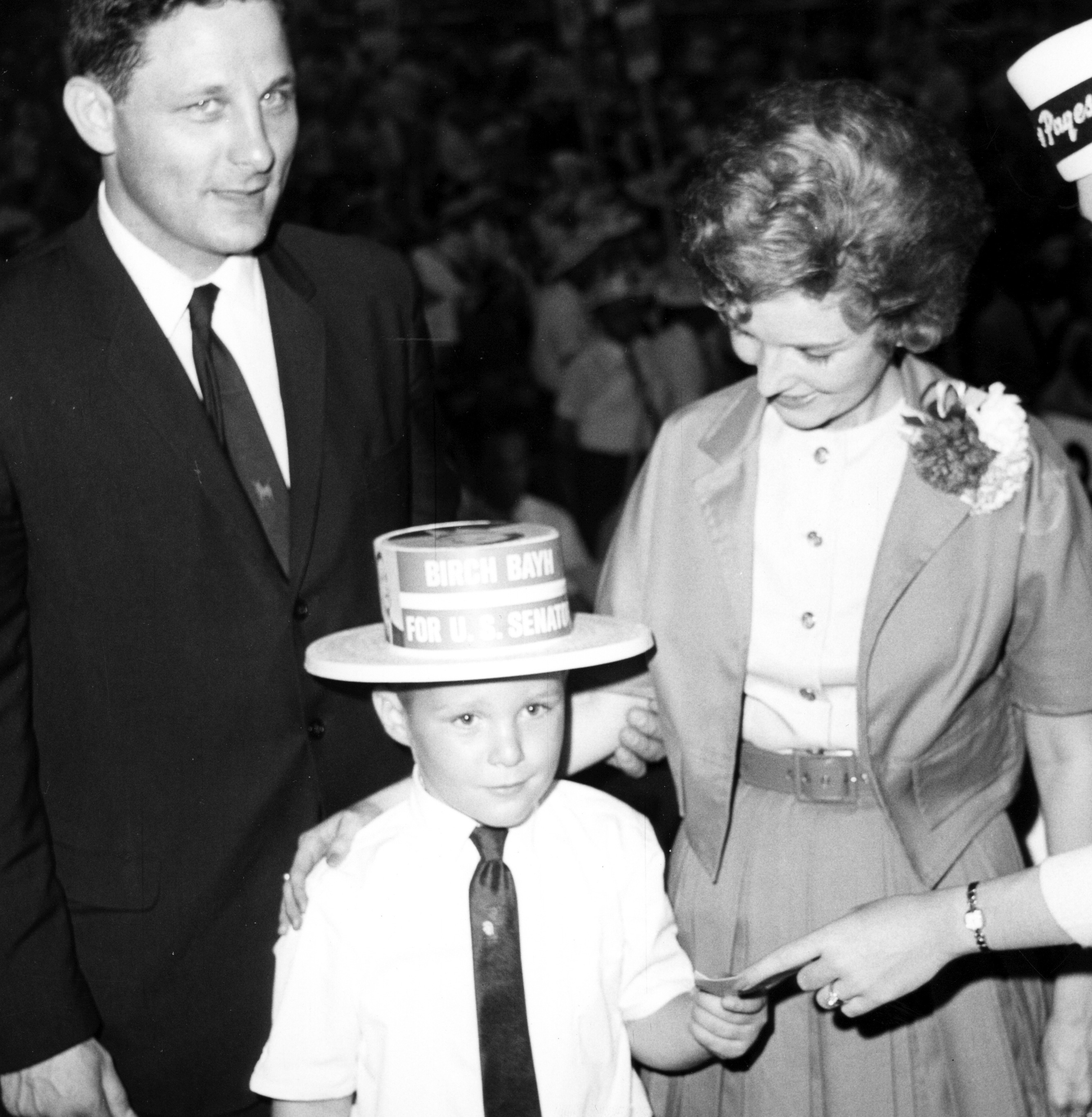
Marvella with her husband Birch and son Evan during Birch's 1962 senate campaign

Bayh suffered from a variety of health problems as a result of a car accident shortly after her marriage. Despite recurring back problems and double vision, Bayh remained deeply involved in the Washington political and social scene. She and her husband also survived a plane crash in 1964 that killed two people and critically injured U.S. Senate member Ted Kennedy from Massachusetts.

The Bayhs were close friends with Senator Kennedy and his wife Joan Bennett Kennedy, as well as President John F. Kennedy and Jacqueline Kennedy Onassis. As an Oklahoman, Bayh also formed warm and close relationships with President Lyndon B. Johnson and Lady Bird Johnson.

Bayh had a keen interest in current events and public affairs and was a skilled campaigner and public speaker. In 1967, President Johnson recognized her abilities and asked her to become the vice-chairman of the Democratic National Committee—a job she turned down with great reluctance at the request of her husband's staff when he was launching his own Senate re-election campaign. Bayh later described his failure to intervene and support her wish to take the job as "totally selfish and insensitive" and said, "That was the worst mistake I ever made."

Personal tragedy also marred her family life. Her mother died early from heart failure, and her father became a violent alcoholic later in life, eventually murdering his second wife and then taking his own life.

In 1971, Bayh was diagnosed with breast cancer. She underwent a mastectomy followed by radiation and 18 months of chemotherapy treatments. In order to support his wife, Birch Bayh announced that he would not be a candidate for president in 1972.

After her recovery, Bayh ("the first public figure to experience and share her breast cancer publicly") became a spokesperson for the American Cancer Society. She wrote extensively about her experiences with cancer in her autobiography, Marvella: A Personal Journey. In 1974, she became a Bicentennial reporter for NBC's Sunday television program, a role she filled through July 4, 1976.

In 1978, more than six years after her cancer operation and treatment, the cancer recurred. Despite aggressive treatment, she died on April 24, 1979, age of 46, at the National Institutes of Health in Bethesda, Maryland.

== Recognition ==
Bayh's efforts in fighting cancer and spreading information about it led to her receiving the James Ewing Award from the American Society of Surgical Oncologists and the Hubert H. Humphrey Inspirational Award from the American Cancer Society's District of Columbia chapter.
