= 1962 United States Senate election in Indiana =

- November 6, 1962
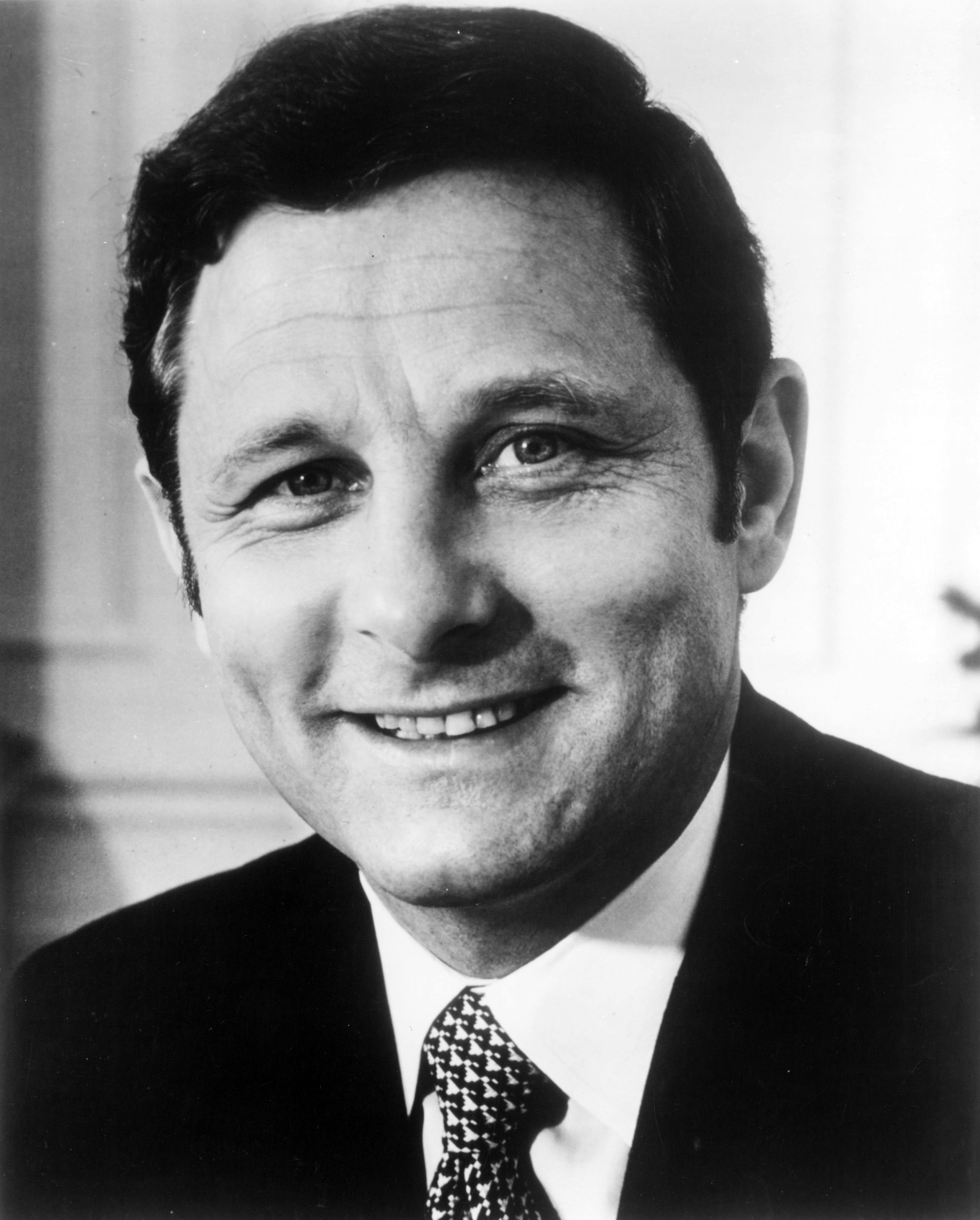

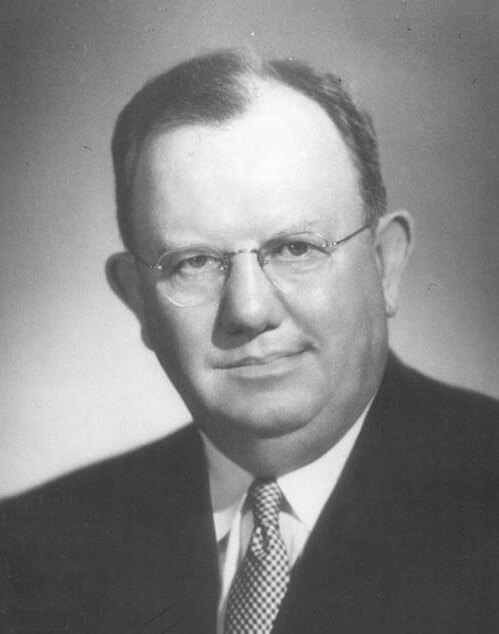
| Nominee | Birch Bayh | Homer Capehart |
| Party | Democratic | Republican |
| Popular vote | 905,491 | 894,547 |
| Percentage | 50.30% | 49.70% |
- County results Bayh: 50–60% 60–70% Capehart: 50–60% 60–70%
U.S. senator before election
Homer Capehart
Republican
Elected U.S. Senator
Birch Bayh
Democratic

The 1962 United States Senate election in Indiana took place on November 6, 1962. Incumbent Republican U.S. Senator Homer Capehart ran for re-election to a fourth consecutive term in office, but was narrowly defeated by Democratic former State House Speaker Birch Bayh.

== General election ==
=== Candidates ===
- Birch Bayh, State Representative from Terre Haute
- Homer Capehart, incumbent Senator since 1945

=== Results ===
1962 United States Senate election in Indiana
| Party | Candidate | Votes | % | ±% |
|---|---|---|---|---|
| Democratic | Birch Bayh | 905,491 | 50.30% | ▲5.91 |
| Republican | Homer Capehart (incumbent) | 894,547 | 49.70% | ▼5.51 |
| Total votes | | 1,800,038 | 100.00% | |
| Democratic gain from Republican | | Swing | | |

== See also ==
- 1962 United States Senate elections
