= 1968 United States Senate election in Indiana =

- November 5, 1968
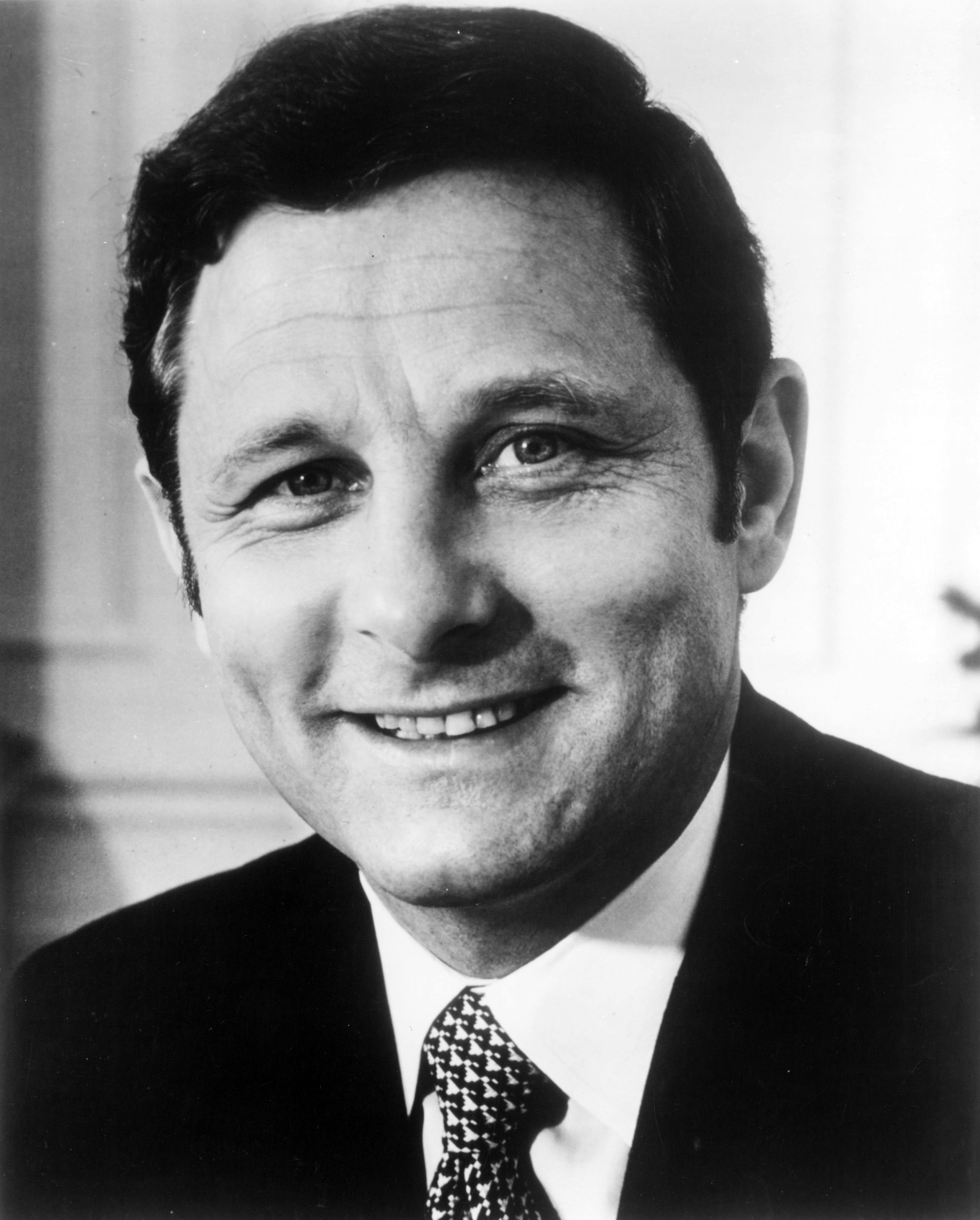

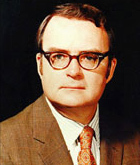
Nominee	Birch Bayh	William Ruckelshaus
Party	Democratic	Republican
Popular vote	1,060,456	988,571
Percentage	51.65%	48.15%
- County results Bayh: 50–60% 60–70% Ruckelshaus: 40–50% 50–60% 60–70%
U.S. senator before election
Birch Bayh
Democratic
Elected U.S. Senator
Birch Bayh
Democratic

The 1968 United States Senate election in Indiana took place on November 5, 1968. Incumbent Democratic U.S. Senator Birch Bayh was re-elected to a second consecutive term in office, defeating Republican State Representative William Ruckelshaus.

== General election ==
=== Candidates ===
- Birch Bayh, incumbent U.S. Senator since 1963
- Ralph Lee (Socialist Workers)
- L. Earl Malcom (Prohibition)
- William Ruckelshaus, State Representative from Indianapolis

=== Results ===
1968 United States Senate election in Indiana
Party	Candidate	Votes	%	±%
Democratic	Birch Bayh (incumbent)	1,060,456	51.65%	▲1.35
Republican	William Ruckelshaus	988,571	48.15%	▼1.55
Prohibition	L. Earl Malcom	2,844	0.14%	N/A
Socialist Workers	Ralph Lee	1,247	0.06%	N/A
Total votes		2,053,118	100.00%	
Democratic hold		Swing		

== See also ==
- 1968 United States Senate elections
