= 1992 United States Senate election in Indiana =

- November 3, 1992
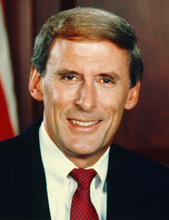

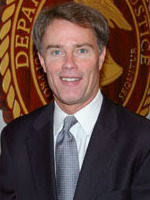
Nominee	Dan Coats	Joe Hogsett
Party	Republican	Democratic
Popular vote	1,267,972	900,148
Percentage	57.34%	40.70%
- County results Coats: 40–50% 50–60% 60–70% 70–80% Hogsett: 40–50% 50–60%
U.S. senator before election
Dan Coats
Republican
Elected U.S. Senator
Dan Coats
Republican

The 1992 United States Senate election in Indiana was held on November 3, 1992. Incumbent Republican U.S. Senator Dan Coats won re-election to his first full term.

When incumbent Republican U.S. Senator Dan Quayle resigned from the Senate after being elected Vice President of the United States in 1988, Coats was appointed to Quayle's former seat. He then won re-election to serve the remainder of the term in 1990. Coats would then be elected to this seat 18 years later in 2010.

== Major candidates ==
=== Democratic ===
- Joe Hogsett, Indiana Secretary of State

=== Republican ===
- Dan Coats, incumbent U.S. Senator

== Results ==
Coats won the election easily. Hogsett performed well in some counties in southern Indiana, and also managed to win a few counties in western Indiana. Hogsett's strongest performance by far was in Lake County where he received over 60% of the vote.

1992 United States Senate election in Indiana
Party	Candidate	Votes	%
Republican	Dan Coats (incumbent)	1,267,972	57.34%
Democratic	Joe Hogsett	900,148	40.70%
Libertarian	Steve Dillon	35,733	1.62%
New Alliance	Raymond Tirado	7,474	0.34%
Write-in		99	0.00%
Total votes		2,211,426	100.0%
Republican hold			

=== By county ===
Coats won 79 of Indiana's counties compared to 13 for Hogsett.

County	Coats	Votes	Hogsett	Votes	Others	Votes	Total
Adams	65.8%	8,345	32.8%	4,149	1.4%	174	12,668
Allen	63.5%	75,991	34.7%	41,499	1.8%	2,207	119,697
Bartholomew	63.4%	17,034	34.2%	9,178	2.4%	631	26,843
Benton	59.1%	2,442	38.5%	1,590	2.4%	98	4,130
Blackford	57.2%	3,253	41.2%	2,342	1.6%	90	5,685
Boone	72.4%	12,043	26.2%	4,360	1.4%	230	16,633
Brown	61.4%	3,591	36.0%	2,103	2.6%	149	5,843
Carroll	56.9%	4,752	41.7%	3,477	1.4%	117	8,346
Cass	56.5%	8,759	41.8%	6,470	1.7%	257	15,486
Clark	43.9%	14,200	54.9%	17,716	1.2%	375	32,291
Clay	58.4%	5,890	40.0%	4,026	1.6%	161	10,077
Clinton	62.9%	7,514	35.1%	4,186	2.0%	244	11,944
Crawford	45.4%	2,109	53.7%	2,489	0.9%	40	4,638
Daviess	62.0%	6,395	36.9%	3,809	1.1%	109	10,313
Dearborn	57.2%	7,882	40.5%	5,573	2.3%	322	13,777
Decatur	63.5%	6,481	34.4%	3,500	2.1%	219	10,200
DeKalb	63.2%	9,117	35.3%	5,099	1.5%	211	14,427
Delaware	58.7%	28,811	38.7%	18,982	2.6%	1,279	49,072
Dubois	56.3%	8,359	42.2%	6,254	1.5%	221	14,834
Elkhart	68.8%	34,644	29.7%	14,949	1.5%	765	50,358
Fayette	53.5%	5,334	45.0%	4,481	1.5%	148	9,963
Floyd	47.1%	12,847	51.9%	14,181	1.0%	273	27,301
Fountain	54.8%	4,565	43.0%	3,578	2.2%	185	8,328
Franklin	58.1%	4,546	39.2%	3,061	2.7%	212	7,819
Fulton	59.3%	4,874	38.7%	3,175	2.0%	161	8,210
Gibson	47.7%	6,936	51.1%	7,424	1.2%	175	14,535
Grant	63.0%	17,696	35.4%	9,930	1.6%	445	28,071
Greene	51.7%	6,637	46.4%	5,954	1.9%	250	12,841
Hamilton	79.3%	43,490	18.5%	10,145	2.2%	1,195	54,830
Hancock	69.8%	14,267	27.7%	5,648	2.5%	506	20,421
Harrison	46.5%	6,256	51.9%	6,982	1.6%	213	13,451
Hendricks	73.7%	23,938	24.2%	7,863	2.1%	668	32,469
Henry	58.1%	11,465	39.9%	7,873	2.0%	404	19,742
Howard	57.3%	19,306	39.8%	13,412	2.9%	976	33,122
Huntington	68.1%	10,511	30.8%	4,750	1.1%	169	15,430
Jackson	57.4%	8,590	41.1%	6,151	1.5%	231	14,972
Jasper	61.1%	5,877	37.5%	3,602	1.4%	134	9,613
Jay	61.3%	5,195	37.0%	3,141	1.7%	142	8,478
Jefferson	48.0%	5,835	50.0%	6,067	2.0%	247	12,149
Jennings	55.6%	5,224	42.0%	3,936	2.4%	221	9,381
Johnson	71.5%	25,069	26.0%	9,131	2.5%	875	35,075
Knox	53.0%	8,683	44.2%	7,239	2.8%	464	16,386
Kosciusko	71.8%	17,624	26.7%	6,533	1.5%	375	24,532
LaGrange	66.9%	4,792	31.3%	2,240	1.8%	128	7,160
Lake	37.2%	66,132	60.8%	108,174	2.0%	3,627	177,933
LaPorte	49.5%	20,525	48.5%	20,082	2.0%	831	41,438
Lawrence	57.1%	9,315	41.2%	6,706	1.7%	275	16,296
Madison	54.3%	31,709	43.3%	25,279	2.4%	1,430	58,418
Marion	58.9%	179,213	39.1%	118,781	2.0%	5,999	303,993
Marshall	65.0%	10,268	34.0%	5,357	1.0%	165	15,790
Martin	51.7%	2,685	47.3%	2,450	1.0%	54	5,189
Miami	58.4%	7,638	40.1%	5,248	1.5%	192	13,078
Monroe	56.0%	23,409	40.0%	16,685	4.0%	1,654	41,748
Montgomery	69.6%	9,718	27.7%	3,860	2.7%	372	13,950
Morgan	69.3%	14,260	28.2%	5,807	2.5%	518	20,585
Newton	59.5%	3,021	38.0%	1,931	2.5%	129	5,081
Noble	63.7%	8,646	34.6%	4,692	1.7%	225	13,563
Ohio	50.7%	1,244	47.4%	1,164	1.9%	46	2,454
Orange	54.3%	4,280	44.0%	3,459	1.7%	131	7,870
Owen	58.1%	3,716	38.3%	2,450	3.6%	227	6,393
Parke	56.0%	3,962	41.9%	2,958	2.1%	149	7,069
Perry	41.7%	3,759	57.3%	5,167	1.0%	91	9,017
Pike	49.4%	3,104	49.0%	3,084	4.6%	100	6,288
Porter	55.0%	30,862	42.9%	24,109	2.1%	1,188	56,159
Posey	56.6%	6,433	41.5%	4,720	1.9%	214	11,367
Pulaski	56.9%	3,176	42.1%	2,353	1.0%	55	5,584
Putnam	64.7%	7,639	32.7%	3,864	2.6%	310	11,813
Randolph	60.6%	7,086	37.5%	4,372	1.9%	227	11,685
Ripley	60.6%	5,977	38.1%	3,754	1.3%	125	9,856
Rush	51.3%	4,090	46.7%	3,719	2.0%	156	7,965
Saint Joseph	54.3%	53,260	46.7%	43,785	1.0%	995	98,040
Scott	40.1%	2,778	58.7%	4,061	1.2%	81	6,920
Shelby	64.9%	10,227	33.6%	5,299	1.5%	244	15,770
Spencer	50.2%	4,630	49.4%	4,549	0.4%	41	9,220
Starke	50.4%	4,014	47.9%	3,816	1.7%	138	7,968
Steuben	64.0%	6,611	34.6%	3,573	1.4%	147	10,331
Sullivan	45.2%	3,649	53.1%	4,282	1.7%	138	8,069
Switzerland	45.5%	1,279	53.5%	1,500	1.0%	29	2,808
Tippecanoe	60.0%	29,129	36.8%	17,867	3.2%	1,561	48,557
Tipton	65.1%	5,063	33.2%	2,584	1.7%	129	7,776
Union	59.6%	1,705	38.4%	1,097	2.0%	57	2,859
Vanderburgh	54.9%	41,079	43.2%	32,300	1.9%	1,423	74,802
Vermillion	42.4%	3,293	55.3%	4,286	2.3%	178	7,757
Vigo	48.5%	19,436	49.1%	19,659	2.4%	948	40,043
Wabash	63.0%	8,992	35.7%	5,099	1.3%	189	14,280
Warren	52.2%	2,051	45.7%	1,793	2.1%	84	3,928
Warrick	55.1%	11,294	43.1%	8,850	1.8%	371	20,515
Washington	50.5%	4,661	48.1%	4,433	1.4%	125	9,219
Wayne	57.1%	15,246	40.9%	10,914	2.0%	524	26,684
Wells	65.5%	7,834	32.9%	3,926	1.6%	186	11,946
White	58.7%	5,893	38.8%	3,895	2.5%	249	10,037
Whitley	62.2%	7,229	35.4%	4,107	2.4%	283	11,619

Counties that flipped from Democratic to Republican

- Spencer
- Starke
- Vanderburgh
- Monroe
- Pike
- Posey
- Warrick
- Dubois
- Greene
- Jackson
- Martin
- Ohio
- St. Joseph

Counties that flipped from Republican to Democratic

- Harrison

== See also ==
- 1992 United States Senate elections
