= Birch Bayh =

American lawyer and politician (1928–2019)

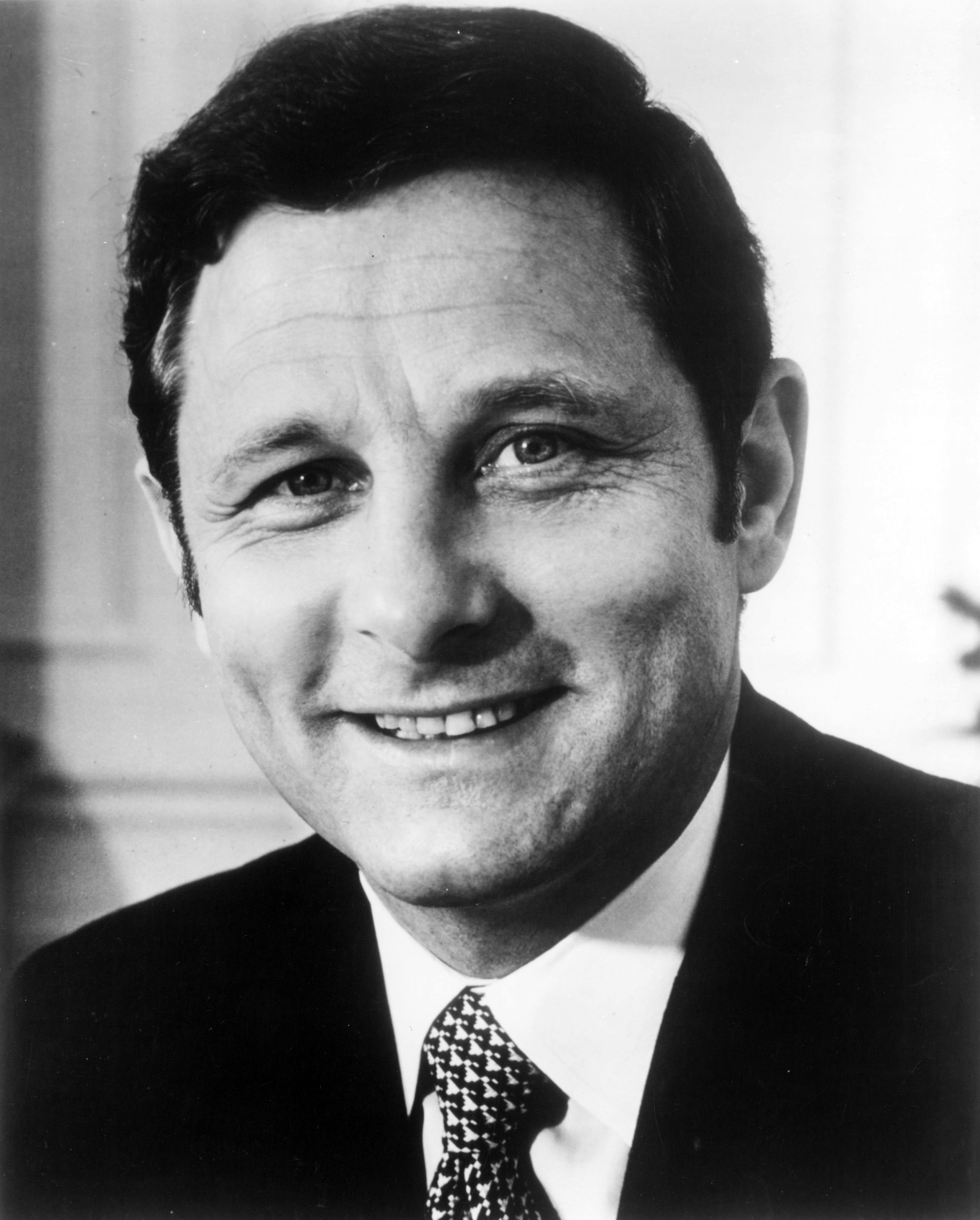

Chair of the Senate Intelligence Committee
- In office January 27, 1978 – January 3, 1981
- Preceded by: Daniel Inouye
- Succeeded by: Barry Goldwater

United States Senator from Indiana
- In office January 3, 1963 – January 3, 1981
- Preceded by: Homer Capehart
- Succeeded by: Dan Quayle

Speaker of the Indiana House of Representatives
- In office November 5, 1958 – November 9, 1960
- Preceded by: George Diener
- Succeeded by: Richard Guthrie

Member of the Indiana House of Representatives from the Vigo County district
- In office November 3, 1954 – November 7, 1962
- Preceded by: John Brentlinger
- Succeeded by: Hubert Werneke

Personal details
- Born: Birch Evans Bayh Jr. January 22, 1928 Terre Haute, Indiana, U.S.
- Died: March 14, 2019 (aged 91) Easton, Maryland, U.S.
- Resting place: Arlington National Cemetery
- Party: Democratic
- Spouse(s): Marvella Hern (m. 1952; died 1979) Katherine Halpin (m. 1981)
- Children: 2, including Evan
- Parent: Birch Bayh Sr. (father)
- Relatives: Beau Bayh (grandson)
- Education: Purdue University (BS); Indiana State University; Indiana University Bloomington (LLB)

Military service
- Allegiance: United States
- Branch/service: United States Army
- Years of service: 1946–1948
- Rank: Private (1st Class)

Birch Evans Bayh Jr. (/baɪ/; January 22, 1928 – March 14, 2019) was an American politician from Indiana who served as a member of the Indiana House of Representatives representing Vigo County, Indiana, from 1954 to 1962 and as a member of the United States Senate for three terms from 1963 to 1981. A member of the Democratic Party, he was first elected to office in 1954, when he won election to the Indiana House of Representatives; in 1958, he was elected Speaker, the youngest person to hold that office in the state's history. In 1962, he ran for the U.S. Senate, narrowly defeating incumbent Republican Homer E. Capehart. Shortly after entering the Senate, he became Chairman of the United States Senate Judiciary Subcommittee on the Constitution, and in that role authored two constitutional amendments: the 25th Amendment—which establishes procedures for an orderly transition of power in the case of the death, disability, or resignation of the President of the United States—and the 26th Amendment, which lowered the voting age to 18 throughout the United States. He is the first person to date since James Madison, and the only non–Founding Father, to have authored more than one constitutional amendment. Bayh also led unsuccessful efforts to ratify the Equal Rights Amendment and eliminate the United States Electoral College.

Bayh authored Title IX of the Higher Education Act of 1965, which bans sexism in higher education institutions that receive federal funding. He also authored the Juvenile Justice and Delinquency Prevention Act, and co-authored the Bayh–Dole Act, which deals with intellectual property that arises from federal-government–funded research. Bayh voted in favor of the Civil Rights Acts of 1964 and the Civil Rights Act of 1968, as well as the Voting Rights Act of 1965 and the confirmation of Thurgood Marshall to the Supreme Court of the United States. He led the Senate opposition to the nominations of Clement Haynsworth and G. Harrold Carswell, two of Richard Nixon's unsuccessful Supreme Court nominees. Bayh intended to seek the Democratic presidential nomination in 1972, but declined to run after his wife was diagnosed with cancer. He sought the Democratic presidential nomination in 1976, but dropped out of the campaign after disappointing finishes in the first set of primaries and caucuses.

Bayh won re-election in 1968 and 1974, but lost his 1980 bid for a fourth term to Dan Quayle, who later became Vice President under George H. W. Bush. After leaving the Senate, he remained active in the political and legal world. His son, Evan Bayh, served as the 46th Governor of Indiana and held his father's former U.S. Senate seat from 1999 to 2011.

== Early life ==
=== Youth and education ===
Bayh was born in Terre Haute, Indiana, the son of Leah Ward (née Hollingsworth), a teacher, and Birch Bayh, an intercollegiate coach and athletic director. His ancestry included ancestors who were German, English, Scotch-Irish, and Scottish. Bayh spent summers on his grandparents' farm in Shirkieville, Indiana, where he later lived. As a student at New Goshen (Fayette Township) High School, young Birch took part in speaking contests, played baseball and basketball, and won the Indiana 4-H Tomato Championship.

From 1946 to 1948, Bayh served as a Military Police Corps with the United States Army in occupied Germany following World War II. He excelled in sports, competing as a Golden Gloves boxer in college and taking part in two Major League Baseball tryouts. Bayh graduated from the Purdue University School of Agriculture in 1951, where he was a member of the Alpha Tau Omega social fraternity and senior class president. In 1951, he won Alpha Tau Omega's highest individual collegiate award, the Thomas Arkle Clark Award. He married Marvella Hern in August 1952, and took courses at Indiana State University in Terre Haute for two years while also running the family farm.

=== Indiana legislature and 1962 U.S. Senate campaign ===
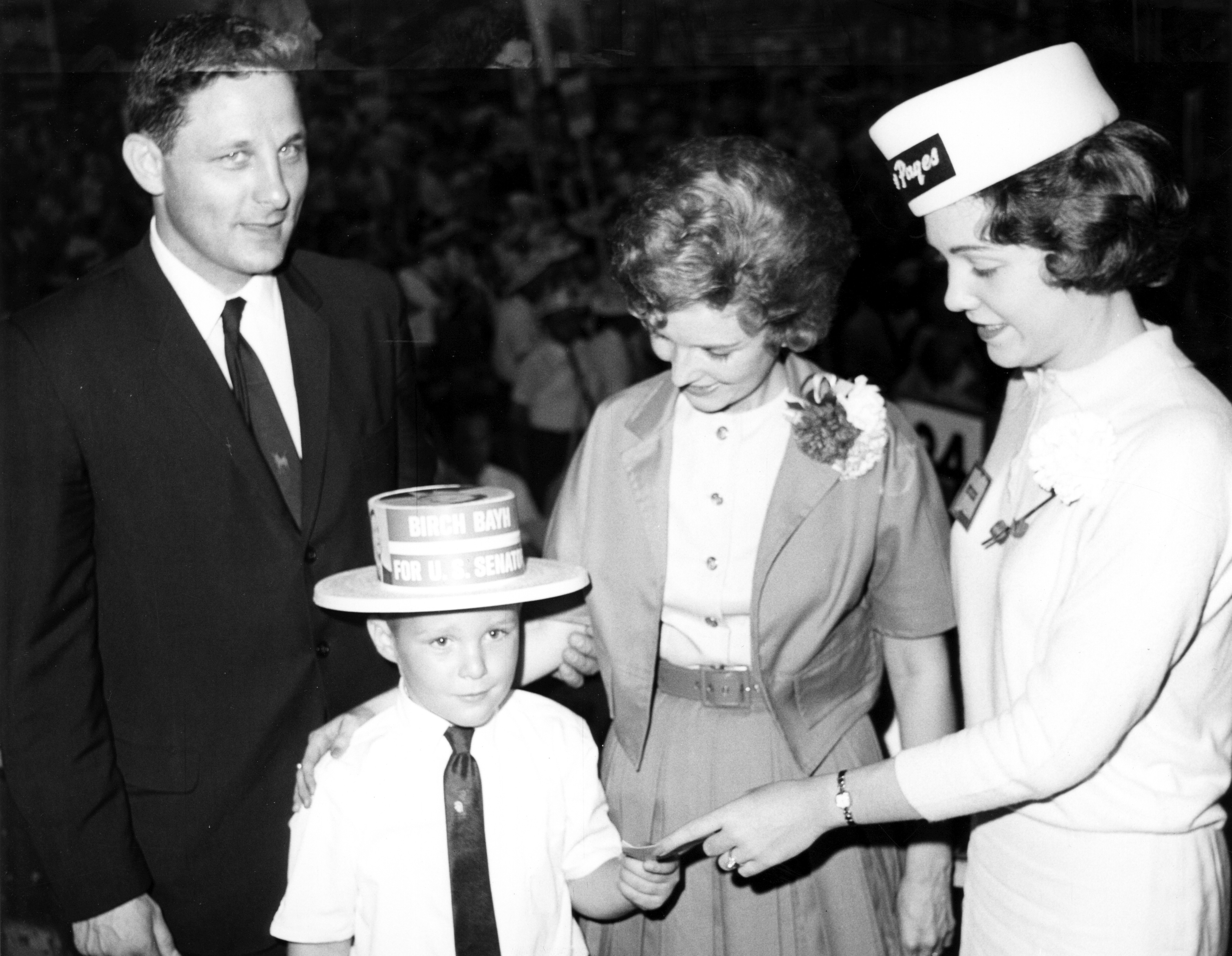
Bayh with son Evan Bayh, wife Marvella and an unidentified woman, 1962.

Bayh's political career began at age 26 with his election to the Indiana House of Representatives in 1954, where he served two years as Speaker and four years as Democratic Floor Leader. At the time, Bayh was the youngest Speaker in Indiana state history. While he served in the legislature, Bayh studied law at Indiana University's School of Law, received his LL.B. in 1960, and was admitted to the Indiana Bar in 1961.

At age 34, Bayh was elected to the United States Senate in the 1962 United States Senate elections, defeating 18-year incumbent Homer E. Capehart. Capehart was outspoken on the threat of Soviet nuclear missiles being placed in Cuba, and was buoyed by the Cuban Missile Crisis of that October. Bayh's disadvantage was dramatized in the opening scene of the 2000 film Thirteen Days, as President John F. Kennedy rattles a newspaper and asks an aide, "You see this goddamn Capehart stuff?" and the aide responds, "Bayh's going to lose".

Bayh's success was attributed to a vigorous campaign of 300 speeches between Labor Day and the election, and a catchy campaign jingle that taught voters the correct pronunciation of his last name:

Hey, look him over,
He's your kind of guy.
His first name is Birch,
His last name is Bayh.

For more than four decades — throughout his entire career in politics — Bayh continued to manage the growing of corn and soybeans on his family farm.

== United States Senator ==
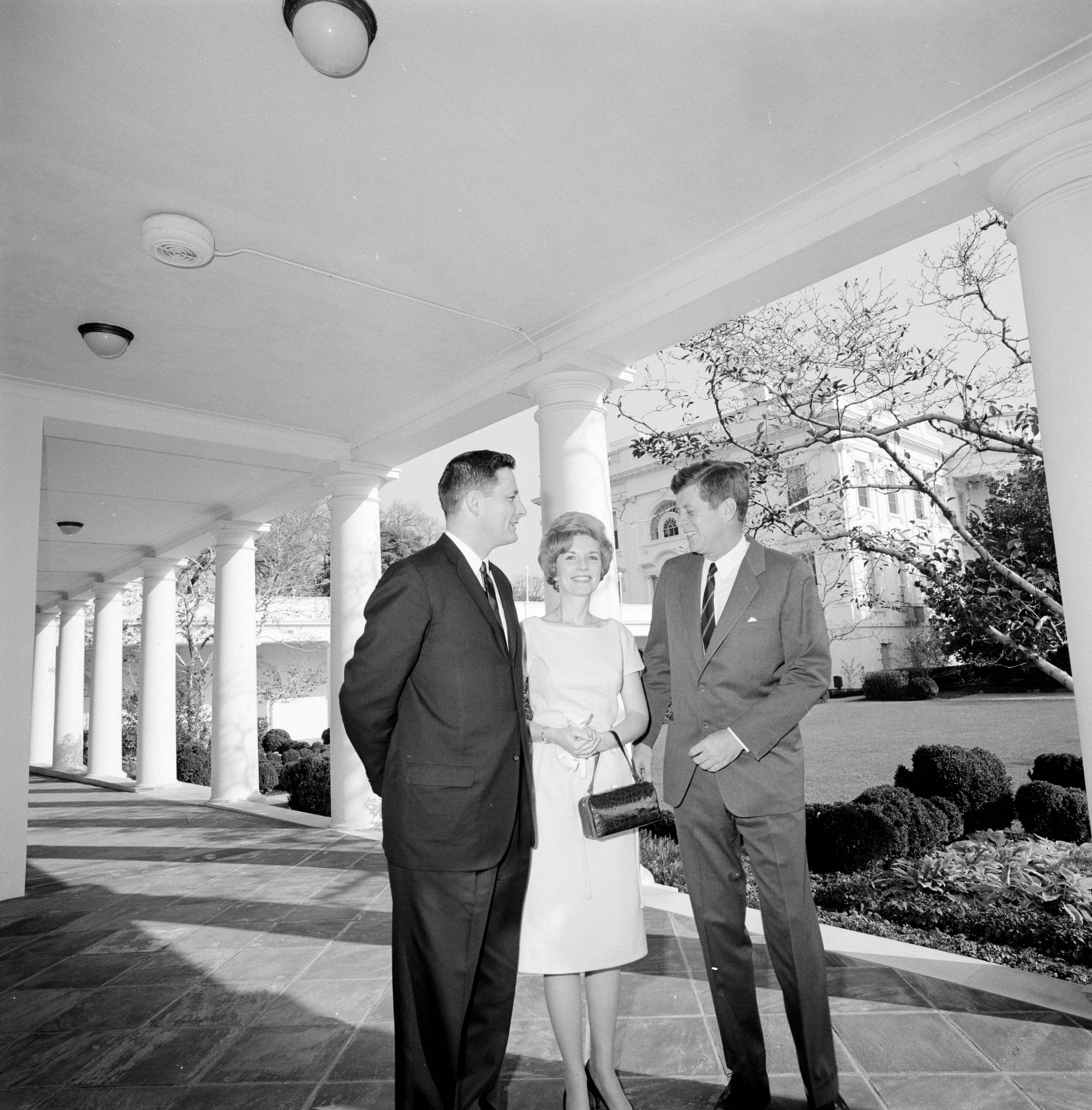
President of the United States John F. Kennedy meets with Birch Bayh and Marvella Bayh in 1962

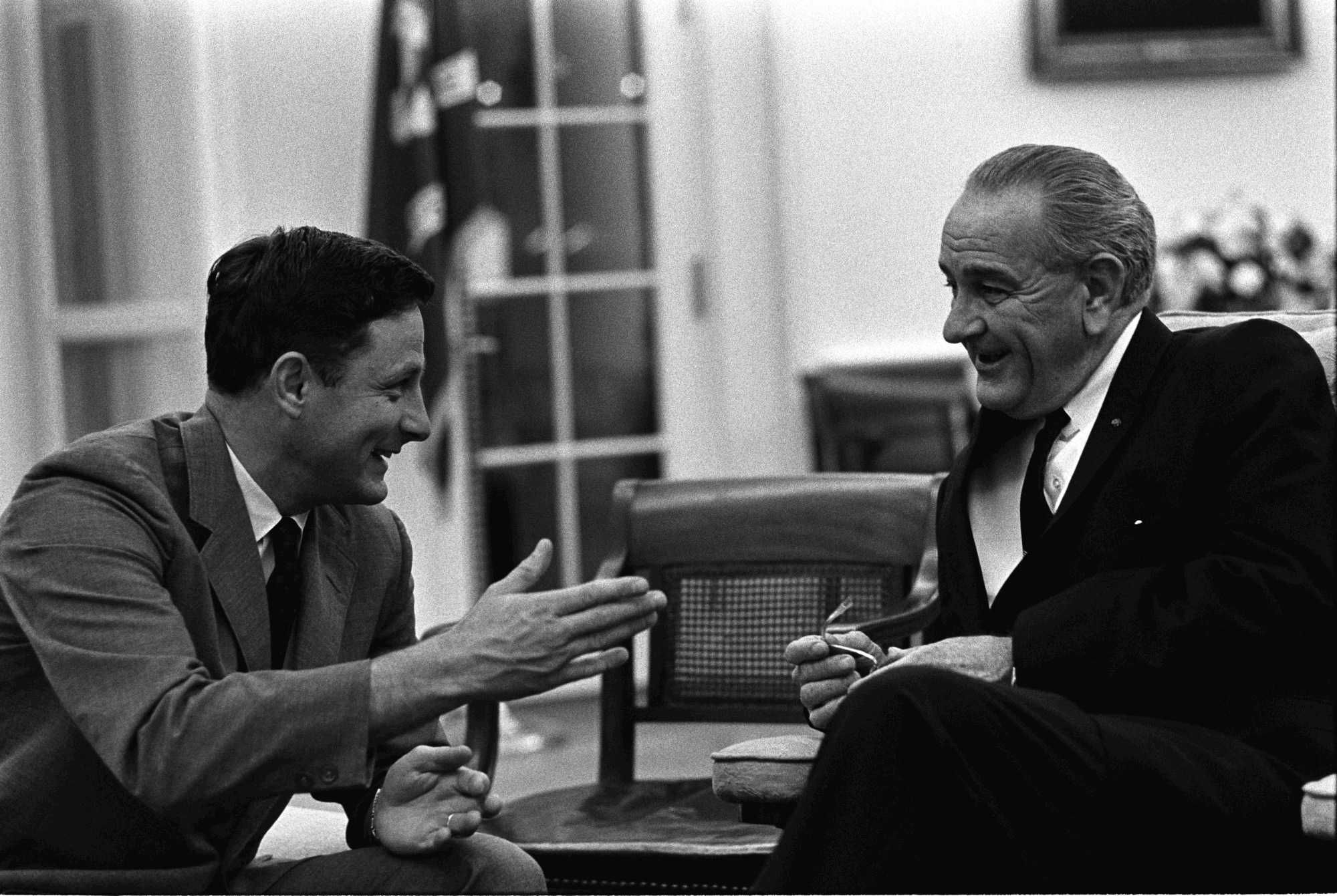
Bayh with President of the United States Lyndon B. Johnson in 1967

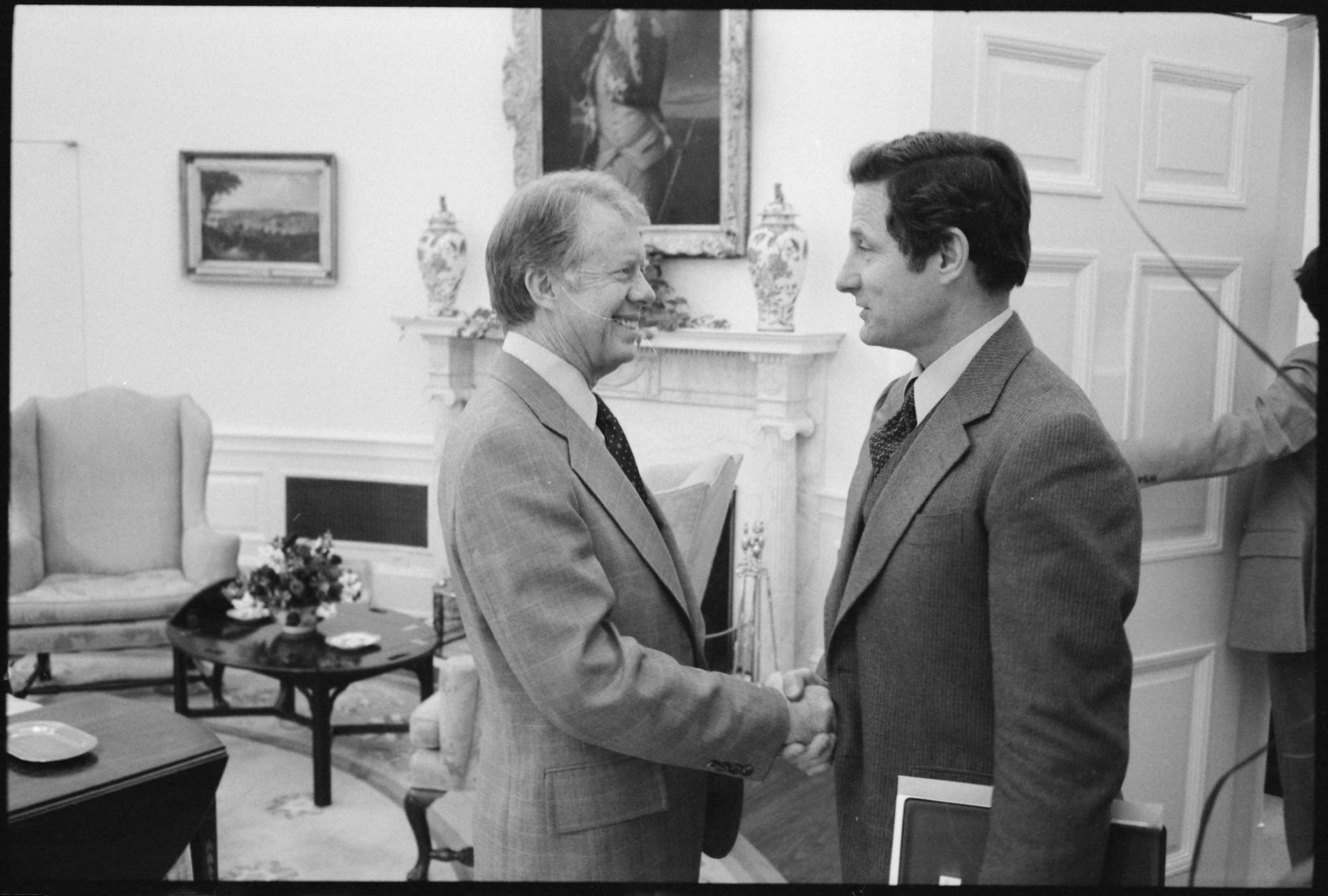
Bayh with President of the United States Jimmy Carter in 1978

=== Drafter of constitutional amendments ===
As a freshman senator, Bayh was assigned to the Senate Judiciary Committee and the Senate Environment and Public Works Committee. While his service on the Environment and Public Works Committee allowed him to assist Hoosiers with various problems, Bayh's work on the subcommittees of the Judiciary Committee had the most lasting effect.

Bayh was serving on the United States Senate Judiciary Subcommittee on the Constitution in August 1963 when its chairman, Estes Kefauver, died of a heart attack. Judiciary Committee Chairman James Eastland planned to terminate the subcommittee to save money, but Bayh offered to serve as chairman and pay for its staff out of his Senate office budget. Thus, Bayh assumed the Constitutional Amendments Subcommittee chairmanship less than a year into his first term. As chairman, Bayh was the principal architect of two constitutional amendments.

==== Presidential disability and succession ====
After President Dwight D. Eisenhower's health issues in the 1950s, Congress began studying the Constitution's dangerously weak and vague provisions for presidential disability and vice presidential succession. The 1963 assassination of President John F. Kennedy brought a new urgency to the matter. Bayh introduced an amendment on December 12, 1963, which was studied and then re-introduced and passed in 1965 with Emanuel Celler, chairman of the House Judiciary Committee. The resulting Twenty-fifth Amendment to the United States Constitution, ratified in 1967, created a process for a peaceful transition of power in the case of death, disability, or resignation of the president, and a method of selecting a vice president when a vacancy occurs in that office. It has since been invoked six times, most notably in the 1973 vice presidential and 1974 presidential succession of Gerald Ford.

In 1968, Bayh wrote One Heartbeat Away, a book about the passage of the Twenty-fifth Amendment. In the foreword, Lyndon Johnson describes the accomplishment as, "He initiated and brought to fruition the first major alteration of Presidential and Vice-Presidential succession procedures since the ratification of the Constitution". The book's preface is by former president Eisenhower, who wrote about the sixteen times there had been a vacancy in the office of vice president and the measures taken to authorize Vice President Richard Nixon to act in his stead during the illnesses he experienced as president.

==== Lowering the voting age to 18 ====
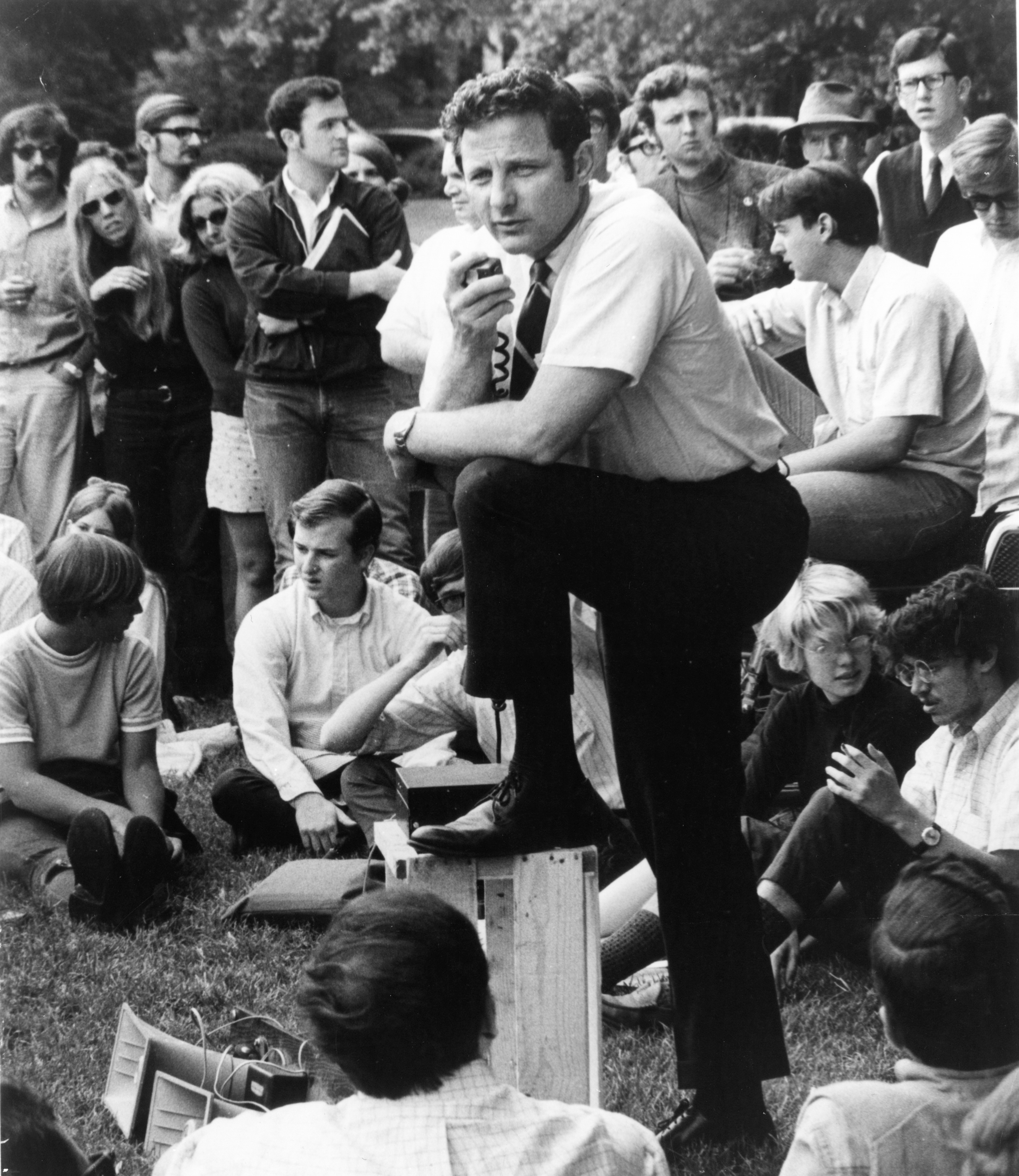
Bayh speaking on a college campus, ca. 1970s.

As a state legislator in the 1950s, Bayh unsuccessfully worked to lower the voting age in Indiana. He continued his effort in the Senate Judiciary Committee, where he also met opposition. In 1970, a new provision was added to the Voting Rights Act of 1965, lowering the voting age to 18 in all federal, state, and local elections. Then with the 1971 Oregon v. Mitchell decision, the Supreme Court ruled that state and local elections did not have to abide by the lowered voting age, although there would have to be dual elections in the 47 states where the lower federal voting age was not valid. Faced with another constitutional crisis, Bayh's subcommittee quickly began hearings on an amendment to lower the voting age to 18. What became the Twenty-sixth Amendment to the United States Constitution passed through Congress within weeks of the Supreme Court's decision, and was ratified by the states within months. As such, Senator Bayh is the only person since the Founding Fathers to have drafted more than one amendment to the United States Constitution.

=== 1964 plane crash ===
On June 19, 1964, Bayh, his wife, U.S. Senate member Ted Kennedy from Massachusetts and legislative aide Edward Moss were on a small plane that crashed near Springfield, Massachusetts. The group was flying from Ronald Reagan Washington National Airport (then known as Washington National Airport) to the Massachusetts Democratic party's convention, where Bayh was to be the keynote speaker. U.S. Senate members Bayh and Kennedy were delayed by a vote which passed the Civil Rights Act of 1964. It had been held up by a filibuster. At approximately 11 p.m., the plane descended through heavy fog and crashed into an apple orchard. Bayh suffered muscular trauma and his wife fractured two vertebrae, but were able to walk out of the wreckage. Kennedy was seriously injured, fracturing three vertebrae, breaking ribs and puncturing a lung, while Moss and the pilot, Edwin J. Zimny, suffered fatal injuries. Thrown to the front of the plane, Kennedy could not move from his waist down and could not reply to Bayh's calling, "Is there anybody alive up there? Is anybody alive?" Bayh smelled gas and thought the plane might catch fire and explode, so he went back into the fuselage to check for survivors. At this point, Kennedy called out, "I'm alive, Birch!" and Bayh pulled Kennedy out of the plane to safety. Bayh went back again to check on Moss and Zimny, but they were unresponsive. Bayh and his wife then walked to the road to call for help.

In 1980, Bayh endorsed President Jimmy Carter for reelection, a decision that rankled the staff of Ted Kennedy, who was challenging Carter for the Democratic presidential nomination. Kennedy's campaign adviser Bob Shrum called Bayh "a son of a bitch" in front of Kennedy, but as Shrum wrote in his memoir, "Kennedy was disappointed in Bayh, but he didn't want to hear anyone bitching about him. Bayh, he said, had a pass, and always would".

=== Women's rights ===
==== Equal Rights Amendment ====
The Equal Rights Amendment (ERA), to establish equal rights for men and women under the Constitution of the United States, was first introduced in 1923 and then in every subsequent Congress for the next fifty years, with little to no success.

In 1970, Bayh witnessed one of these efforts to pass the ERA languish and fail due to poor wording and conservative "wrecking amendments." Through his Constitutional Amendments Subcommittee, Bayh drafted a new version of the ERA to be taken up by the 92nd Congress. Bayh based his appeal on extending the rights already guaranteed in the Fourteenth Amendment to the United States Constitution to a person's gender. The new version immediately won support from two important Senators who had opposed the earlier bill: Ted Kennedy and Robert P. Griffin, the assistant Republican leader. After the House approved its version under the leadership of Martha Griffiths of Michigan, the Senate easily passed Bayh's ERA in March 1972, sending it to the states for ratification. The amendment had seven years to win approval in thirty-eight states. Thirty states ratified the ERA within the first two years, and another four joined in 1974 and 1975. Bayh's home state of Indiana was the final state to ratify the ERA in January 1977, but by then, three states had rescinded their ratification, and three more would do so by the end of 1979. Bayh successfully fought to extend the seven-year ratification period to June 30, 1982, but the Equal Rights Amendment ultimately failed.

Bayh would later say he never anticipated how effective conservative activist Phyllis Schlafly "telling flat-out lies" would be. "[Bayh] says he will never forget", the Associated Press reported, "how she went on Indiana television, set her Social Security card on fire and argued that women would lose constitutional protections if ERA won".

==== "The Father of Title IX" ====
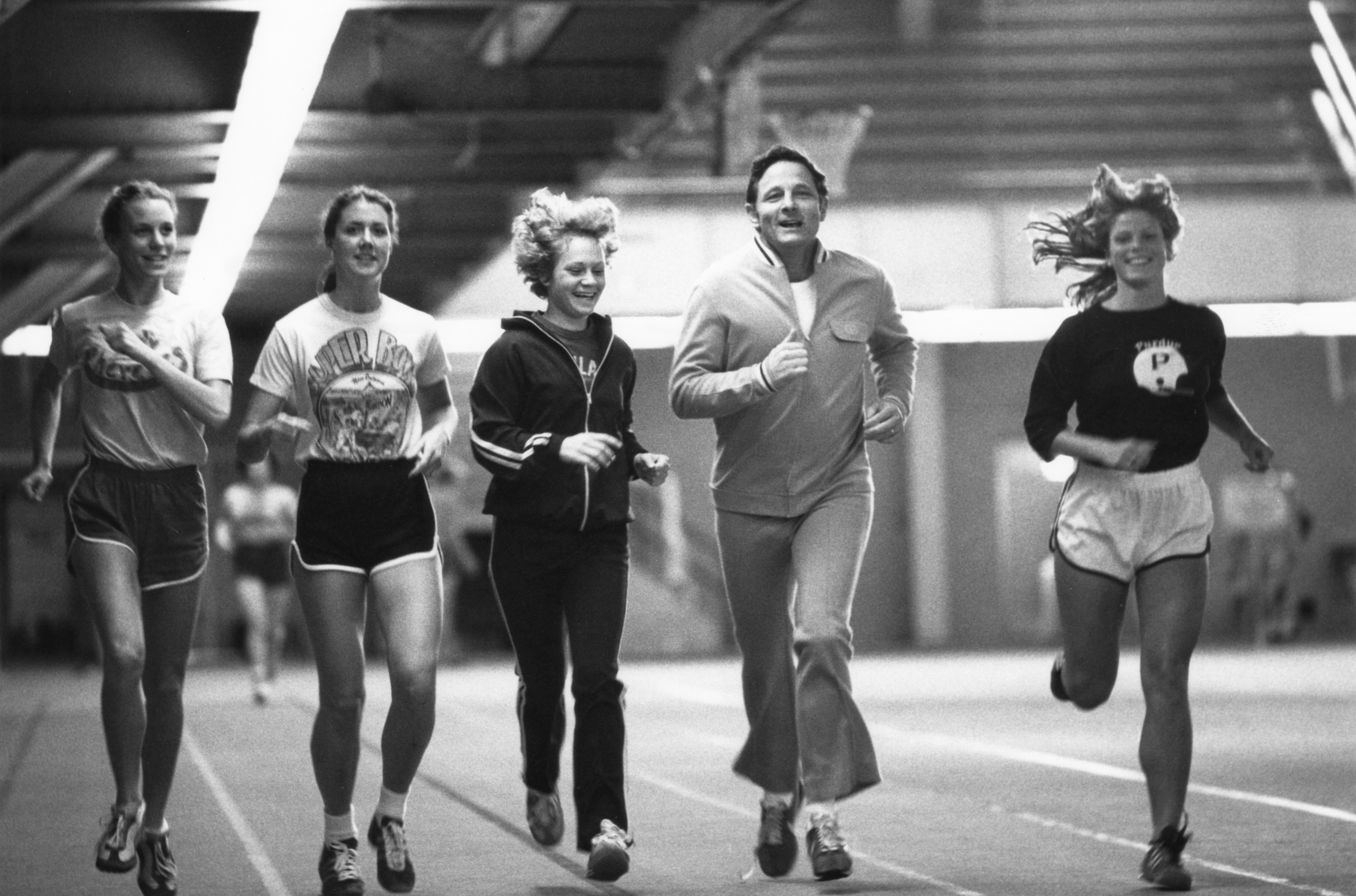
Bayh exercising with Title IX athletes at Purdue University, ca. 1970s.

Bayh was influential in the addition of Title IX to the Higher Education Act, to give women equal opportunities in public education. Bayh was Title IX's author, the first person to introduce it in Congress, and its chief Senate sponsor. As Bayh was getting the Equal Rights Amendment out of committee, the Higher Education Act of 1965 was on the floor for reauthorization, and on February 28, 1972, Senator Bayh introduced the ERA's equal education provision as an amendment.

In his remarks on the Senate floor, Bayh said, "We are all familiar with the stereotype of women as pretty things who go to college to find a husband, go on to postgraduate education because they want a more interesting husband, and finally marry, have children, and never work again. The desire of many schools not to waste a 'man's place' on a woman stems from such stereotyped notions. But the facts absolutely contradict these myths about the 'weaker sex' and it is time to change our operating assumptions".

"While the impact of this amendment would be far-reaching", Bayh concluded, "it is not a panacea. It is, however, an important first step in the effort to provide for the women of America something that is rightfully theirs — an equal chance to attend the schools of their choice, to develop the skills they want, and to apply those skills with the knowledge that they will have a fair chance to secure the jobs of their choice with equal pay for equal work".

Title IX became law on June 23, 1972, and is best known for expanding opportunities for female athletes. Bayh has since been called "the father of Title IX".

=== Haynsworth and Carswell nominations ===
During the 91st United States Congress, Bayh successfully led the Senate opposition to two of President Richard Nixon's nominees to the Supreme Court of the United States.

In August 1969, Nixon nominated Clement Haynsworth, a federal judge of the United States Court of Appeals for the Fourth Circuit, to a vacancy on the Supreme Court created by the resignation of Abe Fortas on May 14, 1969. Labor and civil rights leaders, concerned with Haynsworth's conservative record on workers' and civil rights, soon discovered that Haynsworth had recently ruled in a favor of a company in which he owned stock, and after questioning him on the Senate Judiciary Committee, Bayh felt Haynsworth did not recognize his own conflict of interest. By October, Bayh was widely recognized as "the leading opponent" of the nomination, and The New York Times reported how he "worked with his staff into the night to complete a "bill of particulars" of alleged financial conflicts by Judge Haynsworth", ultimately uncovering several additional instances where Haynsworth had conflicts and misled in his Senate Judiciary testimony. Thus, in November 1969, Bayh and 54 other senators rejected the nomination.

On January 19, 1970, Nixon nominated G. Harrold Carswell of Florida, whom the Senate had confirmed to the United States Court of Appeals for the Fifth Circuit exactly seven months earlier. Carswell's judicial record was even more conservative then Haynsworth's and generally acknowledged to be mediocre, but after the earlier defeat of the latter's nomination, most doubted there would be another major battle. Then a group of Yale Law School students visited Bayh in Washington and asked how they could help. Bayh suggested that they research every case that Carswell had decided in his judicial career. They did so and reported back that Carswell's civil rights decisions had been reversed sixty percent of the time. With their research in hand, "Bayh led the opposition interrogation of Carswell in the two weeks of committee hearings", United Press International reported. The Senate rejected Carswell's nomination by a vote of 51 to 45.

Nixon publicly criticized Bayh and Senate opponents for overstepping their proper constitutional role, to which Bayh replied in a Senate floor speech by quoting from Article Two of the United States Constitution and calling the President "wrong as a matter of constitutional law, wrong as a matter of history and wrong as a matter of public policy". Harry Blackmun was ultimately nominated and confirmed to fill the vacancy. Bayh later supported and voted to confirm Nixon's nomination of Lewis F. Powell Jr., whom he knew well from work on the Twenty-fifth Amendment.

In an undated White House memorandum made public on June 27, 1973, Bayh's name appeared on the master list of Nixon's political opponents, a supplement to Nixon's Enemies List.

=== Electoral College reform ===
The proposed Constitutional change with which Bayh was most closely associated in his final years in the Senate was his attempt to eliminate the United States Electoral College (the method of electing the President of the United States) and replace it with a popular vote in the 1960s and 1970s. Bayh was convinced the Electoral College needed to be abolished after holding initial hearings on reform. He realized that the system couldn't be fixed, as it was so out of date: a president elected today needs only 23% of the popular vote, if they receive the votes in the right places. One of Bayh's proposals passed the House easily but was filibustered in the Senate. In 1977 he introduced reform legislation into the Senate, but it never achieved the required two-thirds vote in either chamber of the United States Congress contained in Article Five of the United States Constitution. Most of the country was in support of this bill, but the southern Democrats and some Republican senators allied to block it. Bayh came close to persuading the Republicans to his side with the help of President Nixon, but after Bayh helped block two of Nixon's supreme court nominations, Nixon decided not to help Bayh. It was later revealed that Bayh was in Nixon's enemies list. In 2006, he joined the National Popular Vote Inc. coalition, which aims to effect Electoral College reform through an interstate compact. The coalition is a group of states that agrees to vote with the national popular vote once the coalition's member states' electoral votes are a majority. Bayh wrote a foreword to the book Every Vote Equal by John Koza, a co-founder of National Popular Vote.

=== Prison reform for juvenile offenders ===
As chairman of the Subcommittee on Juvenile Delinquency, Bayh was the author, sponsor and chief architect of the Juvenile Justice and Delinquency Prevention Act (JJDPA), overhauling the youth prison system, including the requirement that juvenile offenders be separated from adults. After chairing 1971 hearings on brutality and corruption in the youth prison system, Bayh introduced legislation in February 1972, which was signed into law in 1974. Besides the deinstitutionalization of noncriminal offenders, it also created the Office of Juvenile Justice and Delinquency Prevention within the Department of Justice, to ensure ongoing protections. The landmark legislation was reauthorized in 2002. During the October 3, 1977, signing ceremony for H. R. 6111, an extension of the Runaway and Homeless Youth Act, President Jimmy Carter noted his discontent with Bayh not being in attendance as he had "been very instrumental in the passage of this act".

The consequences of the rapid expansion of the juvenile justice system under the JJDPA and the reframing of urban delinquency by Bayh as a "“matter of internal defense” fell mostly on Black communities. The act's "potentiality clause" defined the large majority of Black youth as "potential delinquents", allowing law enforcement and criminal justice institutions to firmly embed themselves in majority Black areas that had previously been served by the programs of the Great Society that were defined as “juvenile delinquency program[s]”. The provisions of the 1974 bill resulted in the rapid proliferation of security and surveillance measures in public schools in major cities such as Los Angeles, increasing contact between Black youth and law enforcement. Bayh justified these measures by claiming they would combat “a domestic Vietnam occurring in the hallways and classrooms of America.”

=== 1976 presidential campaign ===
Bayh intended to run for the 1972 Democratic nomination for president, but his wife was diagnosed with cancer and he put his plans on hold. Before her death in 1979, Marvella Bayh became a leading anti-cancer activist.

On October 21, 1975, Bayh announced his candidacy for the 1976 Democratic nomination in a tour of his native state. "People are looking to someone who can talk to them in terms they can understand", he said while struggling with laryngitis that day. With a liberal record and farm boy demeanor, Bayh's candidacy was premised on his 'electability.' His campaign literature was headlined, "Yes He Can". In December 1975, Bayh came within a tenth of a percentage point from receiving the endorsement of the influential New Democratic Coalition, a liberal organization based in New York that helped George McGovern win the 1972 Democratic presidential nomination.

On the eve of the January 19, 1976, Iowa caucuses, Bayh and former Georgia Gov. Jimmy Carter were considered the leading candidates. Bayh ultimately finished a distant third behind Uncommitted delegates and Carter, seemingly hindered by his support for women's rights. "Bayh has become the focal point of the [abortion] issue", said the executive director of the National Right to Life Committee, since Bayh opposed a constitutional amendment banning abortion before his subcommittee. Liberal support did not coalesce and Bayh finished third in the New Hampshire primary and then seventh in the Massachusetts primary.

Bayh suspended his campaign on March 4, 1976, after 136 days as a formal candidate. At his final press conference, he said, "I'm not prepared to crawl under a rock and say the future of Birch Bayh is over".

=== Bayh–Dole Act ===
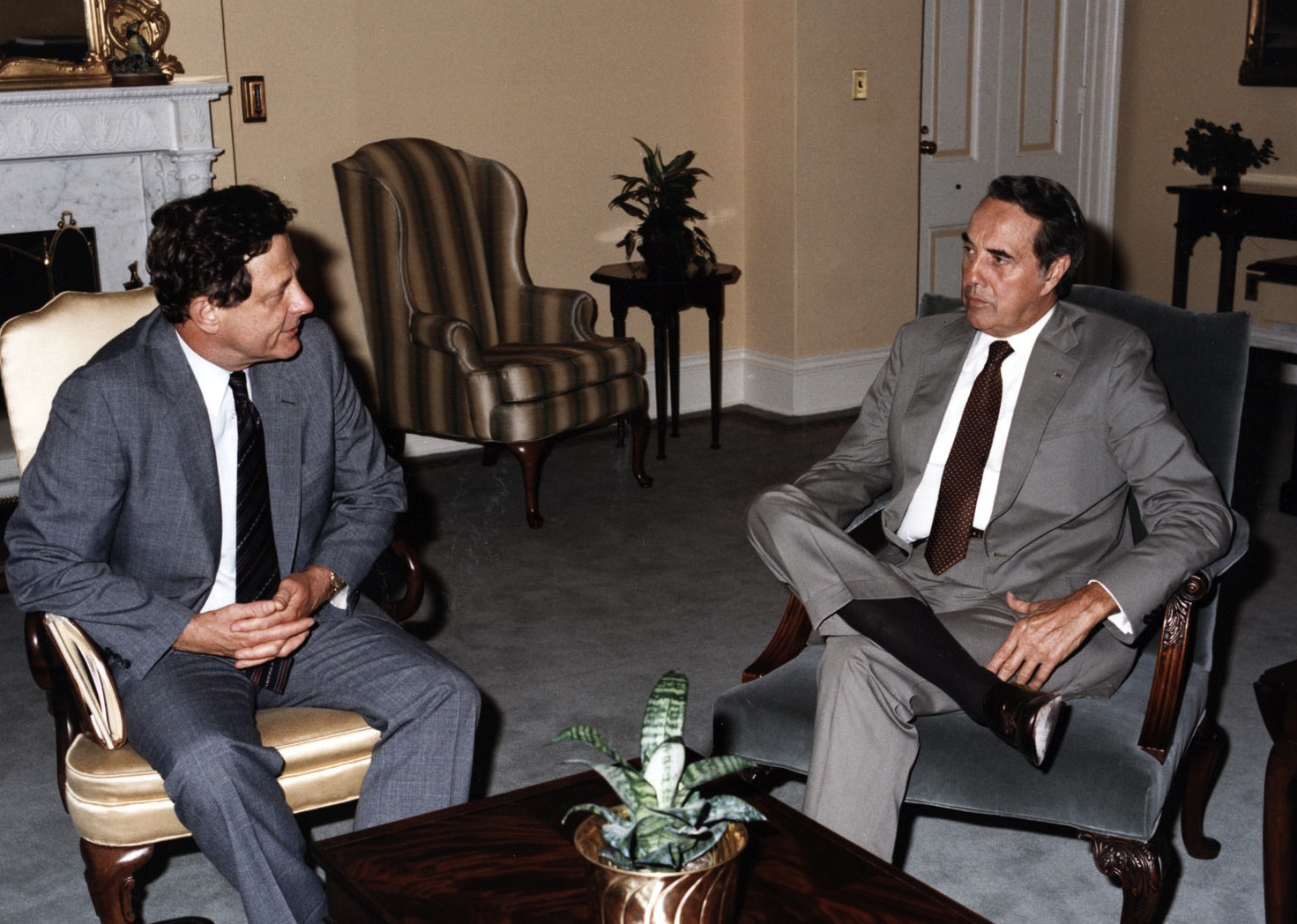
Bayh meeting with then Senate Majority Leader Bob Dole in Washington, 1985.

In early 1978, the question of who owns government-funded research and who could therefore profit from it became personal for Bayh, as Marvella's cancer returned and the Bayhs learned that a technology that could predict a patient's reaction to chemotherapy was held up by restrictions on patent rights for federally sponsored research discoveries. This was part of a larger problem of stifling promising inventions, with 22 funding agencies disposing of patent rights in 22 different ways at the time.

Bayh invited U.S. Senator Bob Dole, a Republican from Kansas, to craft a uniform policy. Together, they drafted the university and Small Business Patent Procedures Act, known as the Bayh–Dole Act, which allows United States universities, small businesses, and non-profit organizations to retain intellectual property rights of inventions developed from federal government-funded research. It was signed into law by President Carter on December 12, 1980.

In 2002, The Economist magazine said, "Possibly the most inspired piece of legislation to be enacted in America over the past half-century was the Bayh–Dole Act of 1980". A 2015 study determined that from 1996 to 2013, patent licensing made possible by Bayh–Dole increased gross industry output by approximately $1 trillion, supporting 3.8 million jobs in the United States.

=== Senate reelection campaigns ===
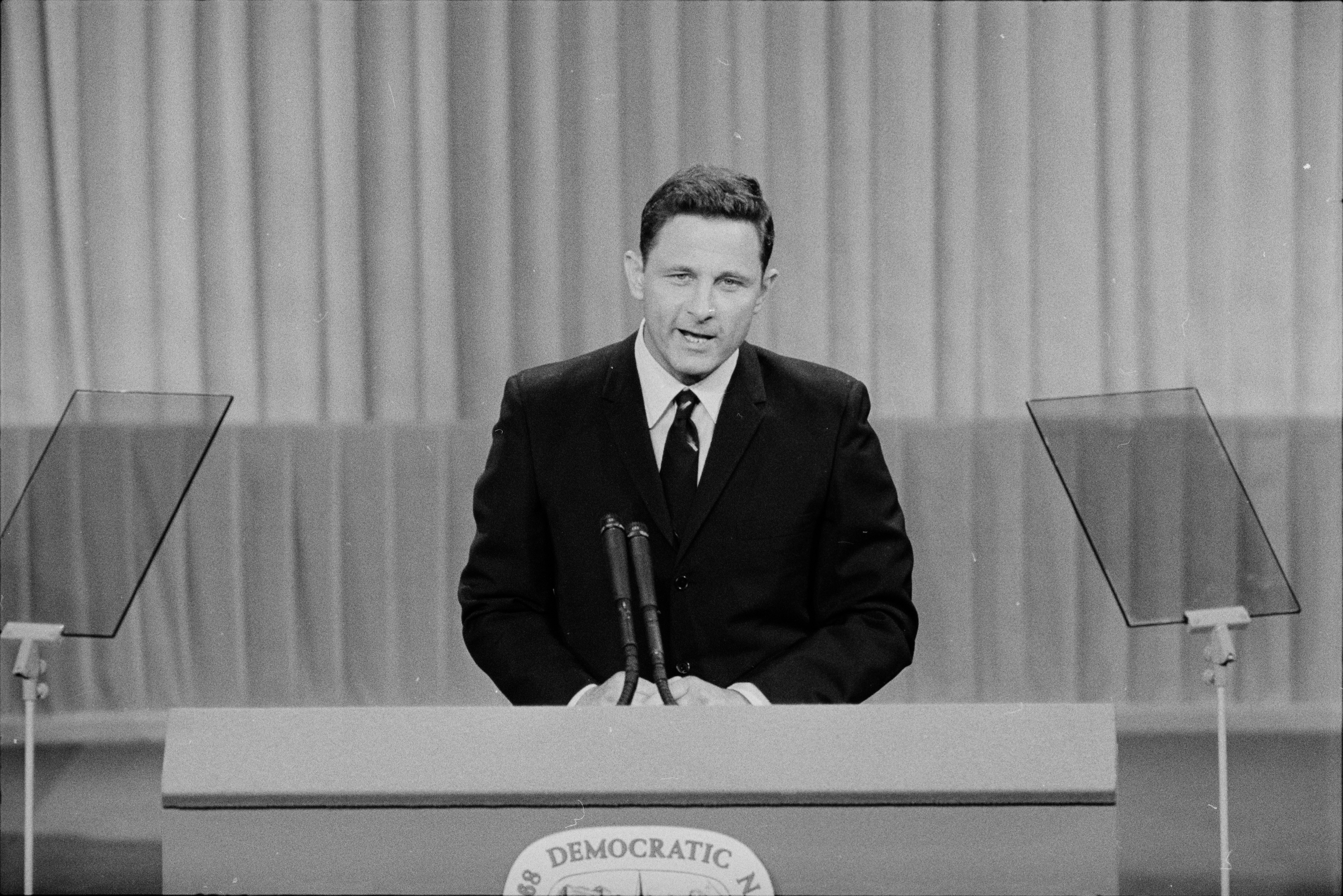
Bayh speaking at the 1968 Democratic National Convention

Bayh ran for reelection to the U.S. Senate three times. In the 1968 general election, Bayh defeated challenger William D. Ruckelshaus with 51.7% of the vote against a strong Republican tide, becoming only the fourth Indiana Democrat to be popularly elected to a second term in the Senate. In 1974, Bayh narrowly defeated Indianapolis Mayor Richard Lugar, garnering only 50.7 percent of the vote in what was otherwise a disastrous year for Republicans. Two years later, Lugar won Indiana's other Senate seat by ousting Democratic incumbent Vance Hartke.

In 1980, Bayh faced Indiana's 4th congressional district member and future Vice President of the United States Dan Quayle. Bayh engaged the challenger in seven debates, and was defeated for reelection in Republican landslide year as part of Reagan's coattails, with 46.2% of the vote to Quayle's 53.8%.

== Post-Senate career ==
=== Legal practice and business dealings ===
Returning to Indiana after his defeat in the 1980 election, Bayh founded the law firm of Bayh, Tabbert and Capehart, with offices in Indianapolis and in Washington, D.C.. Later in the 1980s he began to spend more time in Washington and left this practice. There he worked with several firms, including the well-known Venable LLP. Bayh also served on a number of corporate boards.

=== Advocacy and honors ===
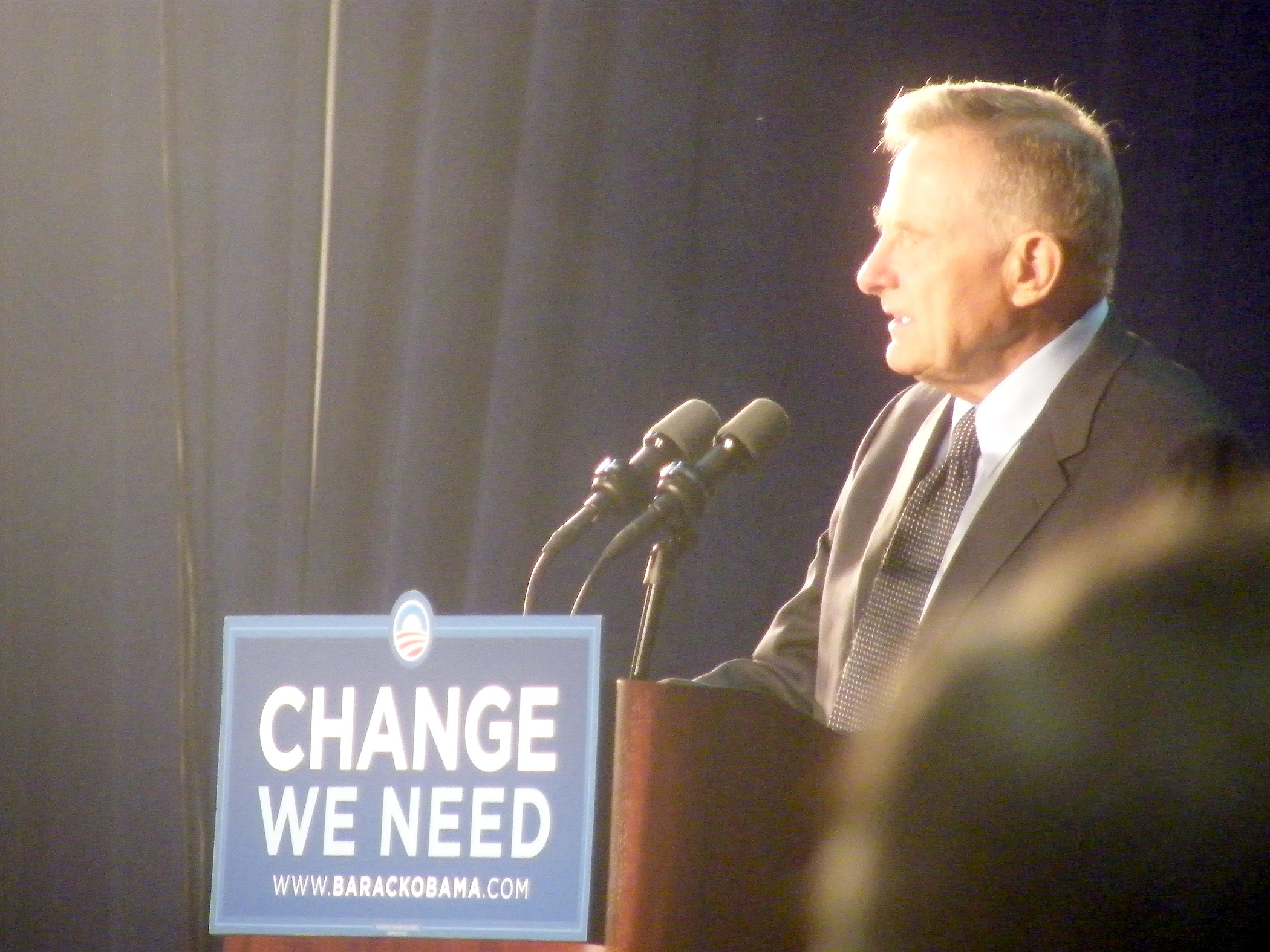
Bayh campaigning for Barack Obama in Fort Wayne, Indiana, October 2008.

In 1981, Bayh joined Robert Drinan, Don Edwards, Edith Green, Patsy Mink and Pat Schroeder to file an amicus curiae before the Supreme Court in the case of North Haven Board of Education v. Bell. The brief urged affirmance of the lower court's decision that Title IX proscribes employment discrimination in federally funded education programs. The court agreed. On August 19, 2004, Bayh filed an amicus brief in another case relating to Title IX, Jackson v. Birmingham Board of Education. Bayh urged reversal of the lower court's holding; the Supreme Court agreed, reversing the United States Court of Appeals for the Eleventh Circuit and holding that Title IX created a private right of action to parties alleging retaliation for reporting sex discrimination.

On December 23, 2010, Bayh filed an amicus brief in Stanford v. Roche, a case in which the Supreme Court was asked to determine whether the Bayh–Dole Act required that ownership patents for inventions resulting from federally funded research must automatically go to the federal contractor. Bayh argued that "a federal contractor's ownership rights to inventions covered by the Bayh–Dole Act cannot be terminated unilaterally by an individual inventor through a separate agreement purporting to assign the inventor's rights to a third party". The court disagreed, writing that "the Bayh–Dole Act does not automatically vest title to federally funded inventions in federal contractors or authorize contractors to unilaterally take title to such inventions".

Bayh continued to advocate for the direct election of the president, speaking with lawmakers around the country about the National Popular Vote Interstate Compact, in which states agree to pledge their presidential electors to the winner of the national popular vote once a majority of presidential electors join the compact. Bayh served on the advisory board of the non-profit, National Popular Vote, Inc.

Bayh served as a member of the J. William Fulbright Foreign Scholarship Board, as co-chair of the University of Virginia's Miller Center of Public Affairs National Commission on Presidential Disability and the Twenty-Fifth Amendment, and as founding chairman of the National Institute Against Prejudice and Violence.

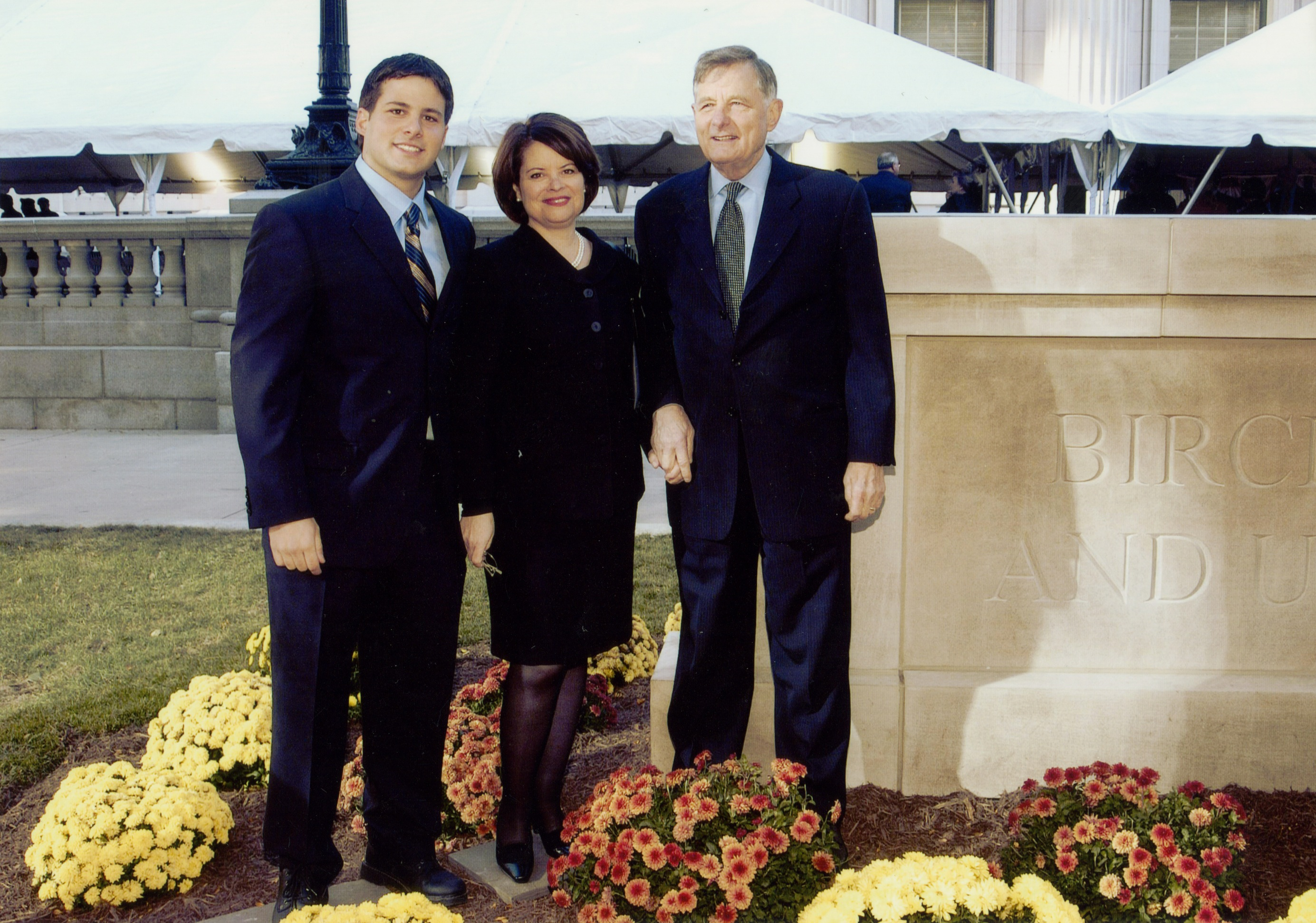
Bayh, right, with his son Christopher and wife Kitty in Indianapolis, 2003.

In 2003, Indianapolis's historic U.S. Courthouse and Post Office was renamed in Bayh's honor as the Birch Bayh Federal Building and United States Courthouse.

In 2009, Indiana State University named their College of Education after the Bayh family; Senator Bayh was the fourth member of the Bayh family to attend Indiana State University (following his grandmother, father and mother); his late wife, Marvella Hern Bayh, was also an alumna of Indiana State University.

== Personal life ==
Bayh's first married Marvella Bayh (who was born Marvella Hern) of Enid, Oklahoma in August 1952. Their son Evan Bayh was born on December 26, 1955. Marvella Bayh died of breast cancer on April 24, 1979. Bayh then married Katherine "Kitty" Halpin in 1981. Their son Christopher was born on July 22, 1982.

Birch and Kitty Bayh resided in Easton, Maryland. He was a fellow at the C.V. Starr Center for the Study of the American Experience of Washington College in Chestertown, Maryland.

Bayh died of pneumonia on March 14, 2019, in Easton, Maryland, at the age of 91. He was the last living former U.S. senator who served during the presidency of John F. Kennedy. He is interred at Arlington National Cemetery.

== Electoral history ==
United States Senator from Indiana (Class III): Results 1962–1980
Year	Democrat	Votes	%	Republican	Votes	%	Source
1962	Birch Bayh	905,491	50.3%	Homer E. Capehart	894,548	49.7%	
1968	Birch Bayh	1,060,456	51.7%	William D. Ruckelshaus	988,571	48.2%	
1974	Birch Bayh	889,269	50.7%	Richard G. Lugar	814,114	46.4%	
1980	Birch Bayh	1,015,922	46.2%	Dan Quayle	1,182,414	53.8%	

== Publications ==
- The Making of an Amendment. Indianapolis: Bobbs-Merrill Company. 1966.
- One Heartbeat Away: President Disability and Succession. Bobbs-Merrill. 1968. ISBN 9780672511608.
- For Money or Love: Boy Prostitution in America (introduction chapter). Ballantine Books. 1976.

Party political offices
Preceded by Claude R. Wickard	Democratic nominee for U.S. Senator from Indiana (Class 3); 1962, 1968, 1974, 1980	Succeeded by Jill Long Thompson
U.S. Senate
Preceded by Homer E. Capehart	U.S. Senator (Class 3) from Indiana; 1963–1981; Served alongside: Vance Hartke, Richard Lugar	Succeeded by Dan Quayle
Preceded by Daniel Inouye	Chair of the Senate Intelligence Committee; 1978–1981	Succeeded by Barry Goldwater
Honorary titles
Preceded by Daniel Inouye	Most senior living U.S. senator (Sitting or former); 2012–2019	Succeeded by Fred R. Harris
