= Pulliam =

Pulliam (/ˈpʊljəm/ PUUL-yəm, /ˈpʊliəm/ PUUL-ee-əm) is a surname of English and Welsh origin. Notable people with the surname include:

- Dolph Pulliam (born 1946), American basketball player and sportscaster
- Ethan Pulliam (born 2004), American football player
- Eugene C. Pulliam (1889–1975), American newspaper publisher and businessman
- Eugene S. Pulliam (1914–1999), American newspaper publisher
- George Pulliam (1923–1956), American ice hockey player
- Harry Pulliam (1869–1909), American baseball executive
- Harvey Pulliam (born 1967), American baseball player
- James Pulliam (1863–1934), American politician
- James Pulliam (architect) (1925–2005), American architect
- Jason K. Pulliam (born 1971), American judge
- Juliet Pulliam (born 1979), American epidemiologist
- Keshia Knight Pulliam (born 1979), Jamaican American actress
- Lee Pulliam (born 1988), American stock car racing driver
- Lindsey Pulliam (born 1999), American basketball player
- Myrta Pulliam (born 1947), American journalist
- Nicole Pulliam, American actress
- Nina Mason Pulliam (1906–1997), American journalist, author and newspaper executive
- Samuel H. Pulliam (1841–1908), American soldier and politician
- Shirley Nathan-Pulliam (born 1939), American politician
- Willis C. Pulliam (1878–1852), American politician

== See also ==
- Flagstaff Pulliam Airport in Flagstaff, Arizona
- Grape Creek-Pulliam Independent School District in Tom Green County, Texas, now known as the Grape Creek Independent School District
- J. P. Pulliam Generating Station, a power station in Green Bay, Wisconsin
