= Eugene Pulliam =

Eugene Pulliam may refer to:

- Eugene C. Pulliam (1889–1975), American newspaper publisher and businessman
- Eugene S. Pulliam (1914–1999), American publisher of the Indianapolis Star and the Indianapolis News
