= Thomas Westendorf =

American songwriter, composer, and educator

Thomas Payne Westendorf
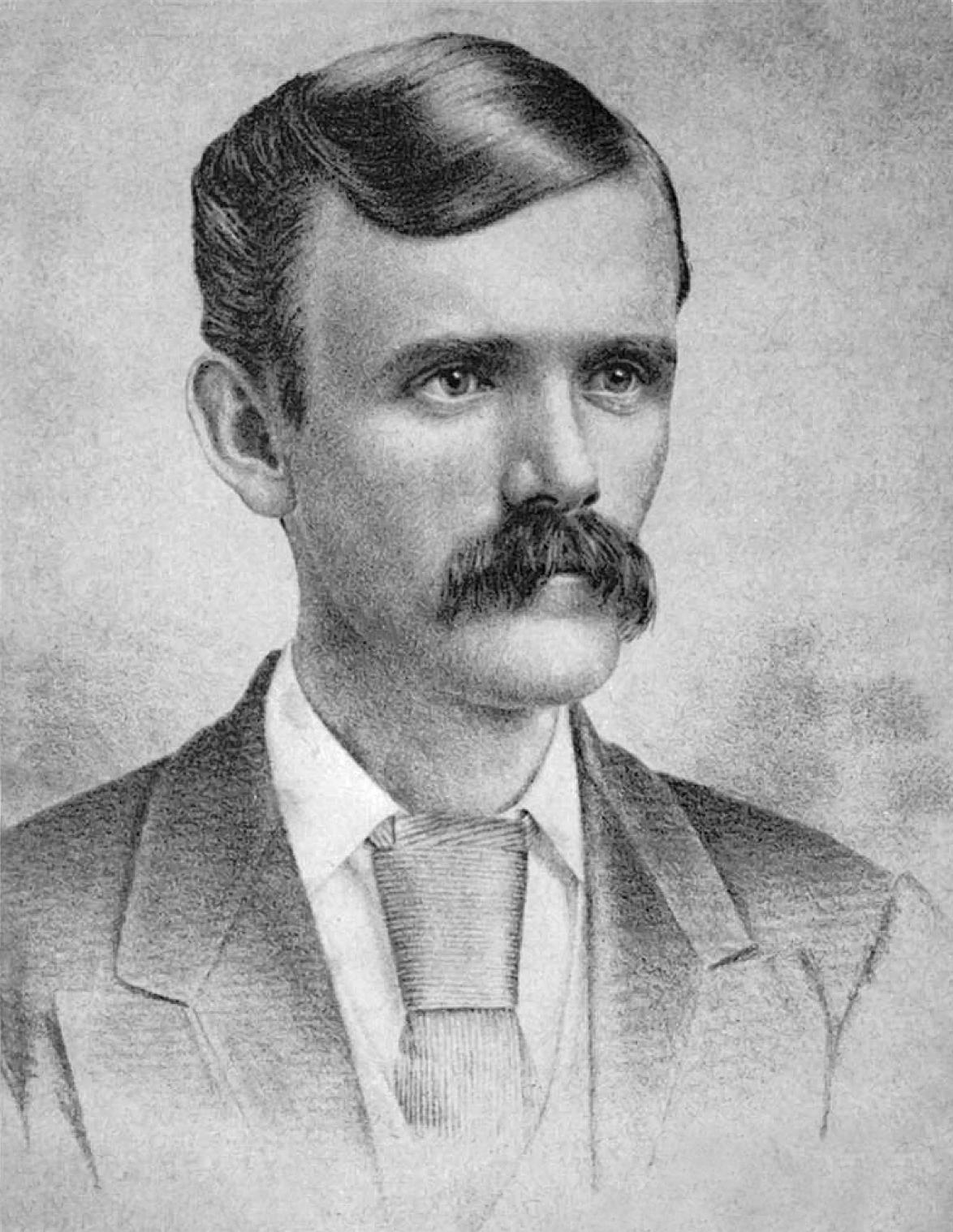
- Born: February 23, 1848 (Note: There is some controversy regarding Westendorf's date of birth. A vast array of journalistic accounts from Virginia, Indiana, and other states report that Westendorf was born on February 23, 1848. On the other hand, an alternative source, later supported by a 2006 source published November 28, 1848 as Westendorf's date of birth. This initial discrepancy was analyzed in an academic source, which concluded that Westendorf was born on February 23, 1848.); Bowling Green, Virginia, US
- Died: April 19, 1923 (aged 75); Chicago, Illinois, US
- Burial place: Mount Greenwood Cemetery
- Monuments: Memorial plaque at the Indiana Boys School and a building named in honor.
- Occupations: Composer; songwriter; teacher; assistant superintendent; superintendent
- Years active: 1871 – 1915
- Known for: Wrote one of the most famous American ballads "I'll Take You Home Again, Kathleen" and hundreds of other musical pieces. Was one of the first educators to introduce music lessons in reformatory schools.
- Notable work: "Oh Gib Me That Watermelon", "I'll Take You Home Again, Kathleen"
- Spouse: Jane Morrow (married 1873 – 1915)
- Children: 2

Thomas Payne Westendorf (February 23, 1848 – April 19, 1923) was an American songwriter, composer, and educator. Westendorf wrote around 500 musical pieces and songs, but was most famous for his hit song, "I'll Take You Home Again, Kathleen." It was the only Westendorf song that lived long enough to receive rights protection renewal. It was republished many times throughout the years and sung by singers including Elvis Presley, Mitch Miller, Bing Crosby, and Johnny Cash. "I'll Take You Home Again, Kathleen" was listed among the most popular American ballads in 1887, and gained recognition as one of the most beloved songs in music history. It was included in a number of musical collections and used in motion pictures, including Mrs. Parkington and Magic Town. It even made a brief appearance on an early episode of "Star Trek" (September 29, 1966).

Despite the fact that Westendorf became recognized in musical circles and received income from composing, he choose to continue his career in education.

As an educator, Westendorf occupied positions of a teacher, musical tutor, and superintendent in a number of reformatory schools across the U.S. His longest position was as superintendent at Chehalis Reform School. He was one of the first educators to start teaching music in reformatory schools. Westendorf led successful boy choruses, male quartets, and glee clubs in many institutions. His work at reform schools received mixed feedback and often drew controversy. On one hand, many children who studied under Westendorf's supervision were paroled and led successful lives. By some accounts, he managed public funds responsibly and the institutions under his management were praised as model schools. On the other hand, in many cases Westendorf was forced to resign his positions, and often moved from state to state. The reasons for his resignations were unclear, controversial, or accompanied by unspecified "charges."

== Early life ==
Westendorf was born in Bowling Green, Virginia on February 23, 1848 into the family of John B. Westendorf, a German immigrant, and Mary Margaret Parham, who was born in Virginia.

In 1850, Westendorf, his parents, and other members of the family were listed in the census of Caroline County; after that, the family moved to Chicago. They lived in a poor neighborhood, where poverty and "petty thievery" was commonplace. In 1863, Westendorf and his friend were caught stealing goods and money from a local store. Because he was a minor, Westendorf was sent to reform school.

In 1865 and 1866, Westendorf studied law, piano, and violin in Chicago, and later the family moved to Delavan in Walworth County, Wisconsin.

== Music career ==
=== Gaining recognition ===
In his younger years, Westendorf wanted to be a songwriter, but couldn't find a publisher. Around 1870, Westendorf met fellow musician George Persley (George W. Brown), who encouraged Westendorf's abilities as a composer and later played a big role in making Westendorf's hit song, "I'll Take You Home Again, Kathleen." They became friends and worked together on multiple occasions.

Westendorf and Persley collaborated on about 28 songs together. According to conflicting research, the musicians may have had equal responsibilities–Westendorf wrote the lyrics and Persley the music–but there was a possibility that it was Westendorf who wrote the majority of songs while Persley made only "minor revisions of the music." Regardless, their first collaboration, published in 1872, became the first official milestone in Westendorf's musical career.

Westendorf didn't write anything else until 1875–1876, when several new songs came out, including "I'll Take You Home Again, Kathleen," which brought him recognition in musical circles and among a number of music publishers. John Church and Company bought the rights to the song and owned it for 56 years. In around 1930, the original version of "I'll Take You Home Again, Kathleen" reverted to public domain, but was difficult to find. By 1947, the song had been re-made into 40 different arrangements, owned by 27 different publishers. During the partnership with John Church and Company, Westendorf received a salary of $50 per month as payment for his work and investment into any future material. As a vast array of other publishers started to publish his songs, between 10 and 45 Westendorf songs were published every year for a span of 15 years.

=== Decline of musical career and other activity ===
Starting in 1876, there was a high demand for Westendorf's songs and he wrote steadily, publishing a vast array of songs each year. His peak activity as a composer came in 1880, when he published 45 works (20 of which were piano pieces for children). In 1888, he was seen as a successful musician with several pieces "having an extensive sale."

After that, the number of Westendorf's compositions decreased yearly. He kept publishing until 1894, then paused and later published six new pieces between 1899 and 1904.

In 1889, Westendorf led the song service of a religious convention in Marion, Kentucky. He visited the first Southern Convention of Christian Workers as the director of the "daily exercises in Rudimentary Music" and "the study of the Bible and methods of Christian work" and held a public choir class.

=== Famous songs and dedications ===
Westendorf often dedicated songs to friends, family members, or to people he had just met to set up communication. In the course of his life, Westendorf wrote around 500 musical pieces and songs, including the following:

- "Our Little Darling's Grave," published in Plainfield in 1875
- "Jeanie is My Bonnie Lassie"
- a campaign song "Vote Like You Shot Boys," written and presented in Chicago in 1876
- "Write to Me Often, Darling"
- "Gingham Quickstep," a piece written for and dedicated to the Amateur Orchestra and later performed by them on the local concert
- "The Shamrock I Brought from Old Erin," written and composed in Louisville, Kentucky, in 1884, and dedicated to Rev. Father M. W. Whelan, a spiritual adviser of St. Joseph's Infirmary
- "To Love and Be Loved"
- "The Bridge that Burned at Chatsworth," written after the Chatsworth train wreck of 1887
- "The Face I Used to Know," written in 1893 and dedicated to a Chehalis singer, Tima P. Misserly
- "Riding on the Old Cayuse," written for Westendorf's son-in-law Joe Gabel
- "That Old Sweetheart of Mine," written in 1894
- "There, Little Girl, Don't Cry," from the James Whitcomb Riley poem
- "Little Boy Blue," the adaptation to music of the poem by Eugene Field
- "I Want to Hear Their Happy Songs Again," dedicated to Adaline J. Coffman, wife of the president of the Coffman–Dobson Bank.

However, only two of his songs become widely known: "Oh Gib Me That Watermelon" and "I'll Take You Home Again, Kathleen," the latter being the only song in Westendorf's career to merit the renewal of its copyright period after its first 28 years of protection.

=== The story behind "I'll Take You Home Again, Kathleen" ===
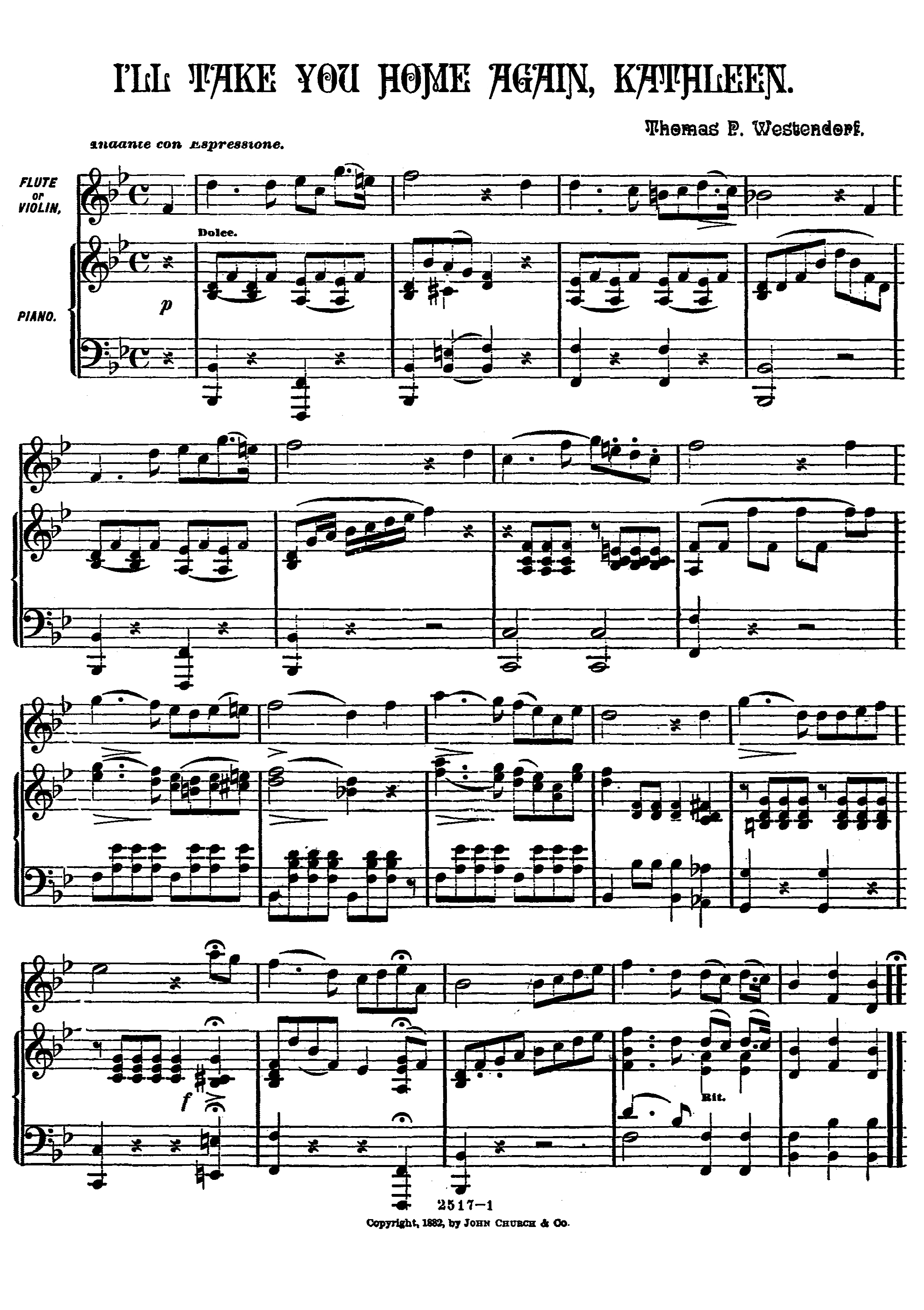
Music notes for I'll Take You Home Again, Kathleen as published in 1883

In an article written in 1887, the song "I'll Take You Home Again, Kathleen" was listed among the most popular American ballads; research in 1969 stated that the song had "proved to be one of the most beloved ballads of all time." The song was called "one of the immortal American ballads" by Thomas A. Edison. He sent Westendorf a letter with a check for $250, as payment for using the song. Another famous person of that time, Henry Ford, was reported to be hunting for an autographed copy of the sheet music for the Ford Museum. The song's first public performance was on an organ in the Family Four Cottage, and later by a band in the Plainfield, Indiana Town Hall. The song was often republished by different owners, added to a number of musical collections, and arranged by different musicians, including Elvis Presley, Mitch Miller, Bing Crosby, and Johnny Cash. It was used in a radio program, Orphans of Divorce, and in motion pictures, including Mrs. Parkington and Magic Town.

There are many contradictions in regard to where and when the song was written and the inspiration behind it. Academic research states its place of origin as Plainfield, Indiana, in 1875, which is supported by a number of other journalistic sources. However, as Westendorf frequently moved from state to state as he changed jobs, some 20th century sources tried to tie the creation of the song to their own town or state. For example, at the time of Westendorf's death, local Washingtonian newspapers promoted the story that the song was written in Washington State. This story was later debunked in an academic article. Other sources tied the song to Louisville, Kentucky, but this was also discredited by later research.

According to a number of academic and other sources, the song was written in 1875. However, there are multiple local accounts dating the creation of the song to other years in an attempt to tie the composition of this popular music to their locality. These accounts arose in 1883, 1876, and even the 1890s. (Note: The date also repeated in a later newspaper article.) In fact, in 1883, the song was already routinely included in musical collections thus rendering these local accounts erroneous.

As for the story behind the song, academic sources and a number of newspapers agree that the song was written by Westendorf during the time he and his wife Jane were first separated after their wedding, due to her desire to visit her family in New York. The inspiration came from the composition written by George Persley (George W. Brown), "Barney, Take Me Home Again." Persley was considered one of the most famous composers of his time. Westendorf often collaborated with him on compositions and they "appeared to be close friends." The fact that Westendorf's song was inspired by Persley's was partially confirmed by Westendorf himself in a letter published in a Boston Sunday Globe article in 1893.

Other stories are dismissed as "parochial legends." These stories include one that stated Westendorf had an Irish wife named Kathleen, who got ill after the loss of their newborn baby and missed her homeland; in the story, Westendorf took her home and dedicated the song to her. Other stories were similar, though they excluded the detail about the baby, stating that Mrs. Westendorf was persuaded by her parents to return to New York, or that Kathleen missed Memphis, Tennessee, from where, the story went, the couple had moved to Washington State. When it became widely known that the real name of Westendorf's wife was Jane, the stories mutated into different versions. In one, she was German, and Kathleen was her pet name, given by the husband; in another, the song, inspired by a "frayed copy of an old composition" ("Barney, I'll Take You Home Again" by George Parsley (Note: Two books spelled both the name of the song and the author wrong. According to two later academic sources, the song was called "Barney, Take Me Home Again," and the author's name is George Persley.)) was written after the Westendorfs' baby died. In yet another, Westendorf's wife Jane, whose pet name was Kathleen, allegedly went ill and was homesick for New York and her family. However, all these stories were eventually dismissed.

== Teaching career ==
=== Schools in Chicago and Plainfield (1871–c. 1876) ===
Despite Westendorf's musical talent, he was always interested in teaching. He pursued a career in education, combining it with music and working as a musical teacher. Starting in 1871, Westendorf became a band teacher at the Chicago Reform School. He was credited with organizing the first juvenile band in Chicago and being one of the first educators to teach music to children in reformatory schools. Westendorf led boy choruses, male quartets, and glee clubs in different states, including Washington, Indiana, Tennessee, and Kentucky.

After the Chicago Fire of 1871, Westendorf went to Plainfield, Indiana, and was listed as living there in 1875. He worked as a music instructor at the Indiana House of Refuge for Juvenile Offenders (later Indiana Boys' School), and, according to other articles, was assistant superintendent and an officer there. In Plainfield, Westendorf met his future wife, Jane, a teacher in Plainfield public schools.

During his service in Plainfield, some public concern was expressed about the quality of care for the boys and the high number of escapes, which eventually led to an overhaul of the school management. By 1876, Westendorf left this position.

=== Schools in Louisville and Pontiac (1877–c. 1890) ===
The Westendorfs appear in Louisville, Kentucky directories for the first time in 1877. Westendorf took the position of a clerk at the House of Refuge (or Industrial School of Reform), where in 1878 he became a teacher. A decade later, he was promoted to assistant superintendent of the reform school, and later to superintendent. His wife worked there as the matron for the girls.

From Louisville, Westendorf moved to Pontiac, Illinois, with his wife and daughter. There, he worked as assistant superintendent of the Illinois State Reform School. At the time, the superintendent was Westendorf's close friend, Dr. Scouller. Various charges of "corruption" were pressed by former employees against Dr. Scouller, the school, and its teaching methods. An Illinois newspaper started an investigation during which a reporter heard confirmation about poor treatment and food from one student. However, another student supported the school and its management (in the presence of Scouller and Westendorf).

=== Chehalis reform school (1891–1903) ===
The Washington State Reform School at Chehalis opened June 10, 1891, and in August Westendorf was asked to become superintendent there. He moved there with his family and remained until his resignation in 1903.

Westendorf supervised the boys, and his wife was matron of the girls. The boys and girls, aged from 8 to 18, lived separately and could be let go for good behavior. Every child who came into the school received a new set of clothing and was given the opportunity to use a shower or a swimming bath. The school premises were pleasant, the rooms were "neatly and plainly" furnished, and students and teachers were provided with clean water and ventilated rooms. Many boys and girls, led successful lives after they were paroled from the school.

Children were educated with the same textbooks every public school had at the time. Boys made their own clothing (and often made extra to supply to other institutions), had daily military drill, and helped in the kitchen. Girls were encouraged to develop talents in drawing, music, sewing, and knitting–skills to make their future homes beautiful and comfortable.

As for extracurriculars, Westendorf organized a musical band; there was also a literary society and occasional musical events for entertainment.

A few sources state that during Westendorf's service as superintendent, there were no complaints, public funds were always expended for school's purposes, and the school was called a model institution. However, other sources report that "serious charges" were repeatedly brought and discussed by the state legislature during this time, but that Westendorf continued to receive support.

==== Resignation from Chehalis ====
In 1903, Westendorf was asked to resign from the position of superintendent at Chehalis. At the time, a number of different newspaper articles debated the possibility of "abuse" and "immoral practices" during Westendorf's service, stating that the "trouble started" when older boys were placed in employment and revealed that "immoral practices were indulged in by some boys at the institution."

On the other hand, a number of people opined that the reasons for Westendorf's resignation were political, as a number of Democratic and Republican politicians were "at outs with Westendorf." On the contrary, Governor McBride, who was in charge of the office at the time, was known for lobbying to separate educational institutions and politics, and denied the accusations that his appointments were ever politically motivated. One article stated that McBride later admitted Westendorf's resignation was "one of the most unfortunate mistakes of his administration."

Another article alleged the resignation stemmed from a conflict that started after an improper relationship between a male and female school employee that led to the female employee's resignation.

=== Reformatory in Bartlett and full resignation (1903–1915) ===
One article stated that the Westendorfs moved to Olympia after their resignation from the Chehalis school, but the majority of sources report that Westendorf and his wife spent a short time in Louisville and then went to Bartlett, Tennessee, where Westendorf got a job at the Shelby County Reformatory. He was also listed as the physician in charge at the Industrial and Training School in Bartlett.

After the death of his wife in 1915, Westendorf retired and moved to Chicago. According to one version, Westendorf retired because he was unable to perform his duties and was asked to resign. Another version stated that the unspecified charges made against him in Chehalis "broke his heart," and as a result he lost interest in teaching and resigned.

== Personal life ==
Westendorf's wife, Jane Morrow, was from Ogdensburg, New York. They met in Plainfield, Indiana, where he came after 1871. Jane was a teacher in Plainfield public schools. They were married on May 21, 1873. (Note: The wedding date given by the founder of the Washington State Historical Society, Prosser, and later supported by an academic source, is May 21, 1873. However, an earlier academic article and some newspaper pieces used July, 1875 as the date of marriage.) They had two children, both born in Louisville, Kentucky, but only their daughter, Jennie (Note: Erroneously called Edith in a newspaper article of the Tennessean.) Morrow Westenford, born in 1879, survived childhood. Like her father, she was talented and interested in music from the young age. At the age of 16, she composed her own musical piece that was esteemed even higher than her father's pieces. Later, Jennie married Joseph A. Gabel, a Washington state librarian.

There is another version in regard to Westendorf's travels and personal life: Westendorf and his wife Kathleen were childhood sweethearts and lived in Virginia their whole lives. Married young, they had a baby that died, and Kathleen got sad and ill. In this story, Westendorf decided to take Kathleen back to her homeland, Germany. However she didn't survive the trip, and he returned to Caroline County, Virginia alone. This story, based on an interview, was debunked by academic research and a number of articles.

Jane Westendorf died in Memphis, Tennessee, in 1915. After her death, Westendorf retired from education and went to live with his sister and her husband in Chicago. There, he worked in a bookstore business, according to one source, and shared a music publishing concern with his brother-in-law in another.

== Death and memorials ==
Westendorf died on April 19, 1923, in Chicago's Mercy Hospital after a protracted illness. He was buried in a family plot in the Mount Greenwood cemetery with the words "He wrote that others might sing" inscribed on his tombstone. One article recorded an auto accident as the cause of death.

In 1929, Indiana Boys' School placed a memorial tablet in Westendorf's name. It was put on the place Westendorf composed and first sang his hit song, "I'll Take You Home Again, Kathleen," and inscribed with the chorus. The ceremony was followed by tribute performances, including a biographical sketch by Westendorf's brother-in-law. In 1940, a new campus building was opened and named in Westendorf's honor.

== See also ==
- I'll Take You Home Again, Kathleen
- Superintendent (education)
- James Whitcomb Riley
- Eugene Field
- Elvis Presley
- Bing Crosby

== Literature cited ==
- McMahon, Colin, ed. (November 19, 1863), "Juvenile depravity", Chicago Tribune, Chicago: Tribune Publishing, p. 4, ISSN 1085-6706, OCLC 7960243
- Beckett, Millard J., ed. (January 21, 1874), "Our next lectures", Greencastle Press, Greencastle: Millard J. Beckett, p. 4, OCLC 15010554
- Beckett, Millard J., ed. (February 5, 1874), "The concert for the poor", Greencastle Banner, Greencastle: Millard J. Beckett, p. 3, OCLC 15010554
- Shellman, Harry J.; Schley, George J., eds. (November 27, 1875), "A new song", Indianapolis People, vol. 6, no. 5, Indianapolis: Enos B. Reed, p. 4
- Beckett, Millard J., ed. (August 10, 1876), "Vote like you shot boys", Greencastle Banner, Greencastle: Millard J. Beckett, p. 7, OCLC 15010554
- McMahon, Colin, ed. (October 15, 1876), "Music - At home", Chicago Tribune, Chicago: Tribune Publishing, p. 13, ISSN 1085-6706, OCLC 7960243
- Pulliam, Eugene S., ed. (October 11, 1877), "Indiana Reform School", Indianapolis News, Indianapolis: Central Newspapers Inc., p. 2, LCCN 82015664, OCLC 8808048
- "Brainard's musical world", The Milan Exchange, Milan: W.A. Wade, p. 1, March 14, 1878, ISSN 2328-1138, LCCN sn86053488, OCLC 13711135
- Watterson, Harvey Magee, ed. (December 18, 1881), "Music - Musical notes", The Courier-Journal, Tysons Corner: Gannett, p. 4, ISSN 1930-2177, LCCN 83045188, OCLC 6637888
- Watterson, Harvey Magee, ed. (June 15, 1882), "Amusements", The Courier-Journal, Tysons Corner: Gannett, p. 5, ISSN 1930-2177, LCCN 83045188, OCLC 6637888
- Watterson, Harvey Magee, ed. (December 1, 1882), "Recreation and reform", The Courier-Journal, Tysons Corner: Gannett, p. 3, ISSN 1930-2177, LCCN 83045188, OCLC 6637888
- Watterson, Harvey Magee, ed. (June 15, 1884), "Westendorf's last composition", The Courier-Journal, Tysons Corner: Gannett, p. 11, ISSN 1930-2177, LCCN 83045188, OCLC 6637888
- Watterson, Harvey Magee, ed. (July 13, 1884), "The house of refuge", The Courier-Journal, Tysons Corner: Gannett, p. 9, ISSN 1930-2177, LCCN 83045188, OCLC 6637888
- Watterson, Harvey Magee, ed. (June 27, 1886), "Amusement notes", The Courier-Journal, Tysons Corner: Gannett, p. 8, ISSN 1930-2177, LCCN 83045188, OCLC 6637888
- Greene, Jonathan, ed. (September 28, 1887), "Songs and song-makers", Richmond Climax, Richmond: Climax Print. Co., p. 4, ISSN 1940-9648, LCCN 86069162, OCLC 13672016
- Coates, Chris, ed. (March 3, 1888), "Around home", The Pantagraph, Davenport: Lee Enterprises, p. 2, ISSN 2641-7642, LCCN 2019200067, OCLC 137348819
- Coates, Chris, ed. (January 25, 1889), "The Reform School", The Pantagraph, Davenport: Lee Enterprises, p. 3, ISSN 2641-7642, LCCN 2019200067, OCLC 137348819
- Kleppinger, Ben, ed. (May 3, 1889), "The southern convention of christian workers", Kentucky Advocate, Danville: Boone Newspapers, Inc., p. 3, LCCN 82015390, OCLC 8807302
- Watterson, Harvey Magee, ed. (July 5, 1889), "Christian workers", The Courier-Journal, Tysons Corner: Gannett, p. 8, ISSN 1930-2177, LCCN 83045188, OCLC 6637888
- Coates, Chris, ed. (July 19, 1889), "Items", The Pantagraph, Davenport: Lee Enterprises, p. 4, ISSN 2641-7642, LCCN 2019200067, OCLC 137348819
- McGrory, Brian, ed. (April 2, 1893), "She wrote "Rock-A-Bye"", Boston Sunday Globe, Boston: Boston Globe Media Partners, p. 30, ISSN 0743-1791, OCLC 66652431
- Moy, Kristina; Guevara, Natalie, eds. (May 26, 1895), "State Reform School", Seattle Post-Intelligencer, New York City: Hearst Communications, p. 7, ISSN 2379-7304, LCCN sn83045604, OCLC 9563195
- "A model institution", Friday Harbor Islander, vol. 6, no. 3, Friday Harbor: J.C. Wheeler, p. 1, March 5, 1896, ISSN 2333-844X, LCCN 88085189, OCLC 17347706
- "A model institution", Plainfield Reformatory, Plainfield: Reform School for Boys, p. 2, March 7, 1896, OCLC 1052677629
- "Sup't. Charlton's Visit to the State Reform School, Chehalis, Washington", Plainfield Reformatory, vol. 4, no. 30, Plainfield: Reform School for Boys, p. 1, October 3, 1896, OCLC 1052677629
- Murphy, John Miller, ed. (May 21, 1897), "Let justice be done", The Washington Standard, Olympia: McClatchy, p. 2, ISSN 2379-7339, LCCN sn84022770, OCLC 10580261
- Bush, Dan W., ed. (January 23, 1903), "Work of politicians", Chehalis Bee Nugget, vol. 20, no. 30, Chehalis: The Bee-Nugget publishing company, p. 1, LCCN sn88085553, OCLC 17560756
- Bush, Dan W., ed. (June 5, 1903), "Has resigned", Chehalis Bee Nugget, vol. 20, no. 49, Chehalis: The Bee-Nugget publishing company, p. 1, LCCN sn88085553, OCLC 17560756
- Piper, Edgar B., ed. (June 5, 1903), "Westendorf has resigned", Morning Oregonian, Portland: Oregonian Media Group, p. 5, ISSN 8750-1317, LCCN sn83025138, OCLC 9278209
- Curley, Rob, ed. (June 11, 1903), "Old fight settled", The Spokesman-Review, Spokane: Cowles Company, p. 10, ISSN 1064-7317, LCCN sn84024754, OCLC 11102610
- Bridges, John, ed. (June 12, 1903), "Change at Reform School", Evening Statesman, Walla Walla: Statesman Pub. Co., p. 4, ISSN 2331-9771, LCCN sn88085421, OCLC 17397533
- Bush, Dan W., ed. (June 19, 1903), "Robertson resigns", Chehalis Bee Nugget, vol. 20, no. 51, Chehalis: The Bee-Nugget publishing company, p. 1, LCCN sn88085553, OCLC 17560756
- Chase, Ivan, ed. (June 26, 1903), "Consider the source", Colfax Gazette, Colfax: Gazette Publishing, p. 4, ISSN 2157-653X, OCLC 26200048
- Piper, Edgar B., ed. (July 9, 1903), "Man and woman in case", Morning Oregonian, Portland: Oregonian Media Group, p. 14, ISSN 8750-1317, LCCN sn83025138, OCLC 9278209
- Bush, Dan W., ed. (May 2, 1913), "Ragtime music on decline organizer works on branch", Chehalis Bee Nugget, Chehalis: The Bee-Nugget publishing company, p. 3, LCCN sn88085553, OCLC 17560756
- "Is paid well for old song", Centralia Daily Chronicle Examiner, Centralia: Lafromboise Communications, p. 6, August 11, 1915, OCLC 22107864
- "Most popular song in United States, says Edison", Seattle Daily Times, Seattle: The Seattle Times Company, p. 11, August 13, 1915, ISSN 2639-4898, LCCN sn86072007, OCLC 1765328
- "Tennessee", American medical directory, vol. 7, Chicago: American Medical Association, p. 1413, 1921, OCLC 760204570
- McMahon, Colin, ed. (April 20, 1923), "Death notices", Chicago Tribune, Chicago: Tribune Publishing, p. 10, ISSN 1085-6706, OCLC 7960243
- McMahon, Colin, ed. (April 21, 1923), "Death notices", Chicago Tribune, Chicago: Tribune Publishing, p. 7, ISSN 1085-6706, OCLC 7960243
- Bush, Dan W., ed. (April 27, 1923), "Death reported this week", Chehalis Bee Nugget, Chehalis: The Bee-Nugget publishing company, p. 5, LCCN sn88085553, OCLC 17560756
- Bush, Dan W., ed. (May 4, 1923), "Politics were cruel", Chehalis Bee Nugget, Chehalis: The Bee-Nugget publishing company, p. 11, LCCN sn88085553, OCLC 17560756
- Pulliam, Eugene S., ed. (September 22, 1928), "Tablet to mark spot where "Kathleen" song was written", Indianapolis News, Indianapolis: Central Newspapers Inc., p. 18, LCCN 82015664, OCLC 8808048
- Pulliam, Eugene S., ed. (September 21, 1929), "Indiana Boys' School plans to honor composer of "Kathleen"", Indianapolis News, Indianapolis: Central Newspapers Inc., p. 5, LCCN 82015664, OCLC 8808048
- Pulliam, Eugene S., ed. (September 22, 1929), "Memorial honors song composer; Unveiling today", Indianapolis Star, Indianapolis: Central Newspapers Inc., p. 7, LCCN 82015664, OCLC 8808048
- "Green Hill is in 75th year", Centralia Daily Chronicle, Centralia: Lafromboise Communications, pp. D-10, October 10, 1966, OCLC 22107864
- Bauer, Harry C. (January 1, 1969), Burke, Robert E. (ed.), "Let's Take Kathleen Home Once More", Pacific Northwest Quarterly, 60 (1), Seattle: University of Washington: 25–28, ISSN 0030-8803, JSTOR 40489160, LCCN 08030966, OCLC 2392232
- Bush, Dan W. (July 22, 1898), Bush, Dan W. (ed.), "Editor notes", Chehalis Bee, Chehalis: The Bee-Nugget publishing company, p. 2, LCCN sn88085553, OCLC 17560756
- Conover, C. T. (April 29, 1957), "Just cogitating: Henry McBride had active political career", Seattle Daily Times, Seattle: The Seattle Times Company, p. 26, ISSN 2639-4898, LCCN sn86072007, OCLC 1765328
- Duncan, Don (December 19, 1966), "A story behind a song", Seattle Daily Times, Seattle: The Seattle Times Company, p. 29, ISSN 2639-4898, LCCN sn86072007, OCLC 1765328
- Fitzgerald, Ruth Coder (February 9, 2002), Jenkins, Phil (ed.), ""I'll take you home again, Kathleen"", Fredericksburg.com, Fredericksburg: Lee BHM Corp., archived from the original on March 5, 2020
- Fleshman, Charlotte (March 17, 1965b), Coates, Chris (ed.), ""Kathleen" writer German once called Pontiac Home", The Pantagraph, Davenport: Lee Enterprises, p. 29, ISSN 2641-7642, LCCN 2019200067, OCLC 137348819
- Fleshman, Charlotte (April 18, 1965a), Coates, Chris (ed.), "Smithsonian says, "You're wrong"-- we say, "Are we?"", The Pantagraph, Davenport: Lee Enterprises, p. 34, ISSN 2641-7642, LCCN 2019200067, OCLC 137348819
- Fleshman, Charlotte (March 15, 1969), Cain, J. Damon (ed.), "Smithsonian saves face after fray", Beckley Post-Herald The Raleigh Register, Montgomery: Community Newspaper Holdings, Inc., p. 4, OCLC 13196460
- Geller, James J. (1931), Famous songs and their stories, New York: Macaulay, LCCN 31022278, OCLC 1891619
- Herschell, William (April 9, 1938), Pulliam, Eugene S. (ed.), "Indiana Boys School to honor Thomas Paine Westendorf, memorializing his "I'll take you home again, Kathleen"", Indianapolis News, Indianapolis: Central Newspapers Inc., p. 9, LCCN 82015664, OCLC 8808048
- Hill, Richard S. (June 1, 1948), Hill, Richard S. (ed.), "Getting Kathleen Home Again", Notes, 2, 5 (3), Middleton: Music Library Association: 338–353, doi:10.2307/890434, ISSN 0027-4380, JSTOR 890434, LCCN 43045299, OCLC 757266212
- Holden, Alfred H. (December 29, 1946), De Varenne, Maria (ed.), "An old song", The Tennessean Magazine, Tysons Corner: Gannett, pp. 5, 12, LCCN 84024774, OCLC 11232458
- Howard, John Tasker (1946) [1929], Our American music: three hundred years of it (3rd revised ed.), New York: Thomas Y. Crowell Company, LCCN 46005438, OCLC 423103
- Jones, Pat (February 23, 2006a), Schwartz, Eric (ed.), "Did first Green Hill superintendent write famous song to wife here?", Centralia Chronicle, Centralia: Lafromboise Communications, p. 2, OCLC 22107864
- Jones, Pat (March 11, 2006b), Schwartz, Eric (ed.), "Song's writer waited a long time to fulfill promise to his wife", Centralia Chronicle, Centralia: Lafromboise Communications, pp. D1, D6, OCLC 22107864
- Lambert, Michael (November 3, 2011), John, Warren St. (ed.), "Columnist Debunks Plainfield's Connection to a Famous Song", Patch Media, New York: Hale Global
- Lamborn, Frank M. (1904), Second Biennial Report State Board of Control of Washington 1903-1904, Spokane: Inland Printing Company, LCCN 09003251, OCLC 4761257391
- Malone, Ted (May 28, 1961), "Kathleen a burger mag. says", Advance News, Ogdensburg: Northern New York Pub. Co., Inc., p. 10, OCLC 456194886
- Peterson, H. Gardner (January 25, 1948), ""I'll take you home again, Kathleen" -- but he didn't", Seattle Daily Times, Seattle: The Seattle Times Company, p. 7, ISSN 2639-4898, LCCN sn86072007, OCLC 1765328
- Prosser, William Farrand (1903), Lewis, Edward Gardner (ed.), A history of the Puget Sound country, its resources, its commerce and its people, New York City: Edward Gardner Lewis, LCCN 05013767
- Westendorf, Thomas P. (1880), Why don't you write to me darling, W. F. Shaw
- Westendorf, Thomas P. (February 1, 1883), "I'll take you home again, Kathleen", The Musical Visitor, a Magazine of Musical Literature and Music, Cincinnati: John Church Company, p. 54, LCCN 89092388, OCLC 10223339
- Wight, Richard C. (May 17, 1936), Mudd, Paige (ed.), "Original of famous song discovered", Richmond Times-Dispatch, Omaha: Berkshire Hathaway, p. 51, ISSN 1941-2967, LCCN 85038614, OCLC 12872264
