= Nina Mason Pulliam =

American journalist, author and newspaper executive (1906–1997)

- Born: September 19, 1906; Martinsville, Indiana, US
- Died: March 26, 1997 (aged 90)
- Occupations: Journalist, author, and newspaper executive
- Board member of: Central Newspapers, Inc. Franklin College; Heard Museum
- Spouse: Eugene C. Pulliam
- Relatives: Eugene S. Pulliam (stepson); Dan Quayle (step-grandson)

Nina Mason Pulliam (September 19, 1906 – March 26, 1997) was an American journalist, author, and newspaper executive in Arizona and Indiana, where she was also well known as a philanthropist and civic leader. Pulliam began her career as a journalist in Indiana and worked with her husband, Eugene C. Pulliam, as founding secretary-treasurer and a member of the board of Central Newspapers, Incorporated, the media holding company he established in 1934. Following her husband's death in 1975, she served as president of the company until her retirement, in 1979, and as publisher of two of the company's newspapers, the Arizona Republic and the Phoenix Gazette, from 1975 to 1978. She also wrote a series of articles that were published in North American newspapers and later compiled into several books.

During her lifetime and through the Nina Mason Pulliam Charitable Trust, which was established after her death in 1997, Pulliam contributed to numerous philanthropic projects to support her varied interests in education, animals, nature, the outdoors, and Native American art and culture, especially programs in Arizona and Indiana. A major initiative of her charitable trust is the Nina Mason Pulliam Legacy Scholars program. Other recipients of her philanthropy in Arizona include the Phoenix Zoo, Heard Museum, Desert Botanical Garden, Arizona Humane Society, Phoenix's Burton Barr Central Library, the Arizona Recreation Center for the Handicapped, and a walking trail in the Grand Canyon National Park. Indiana projects have included the Nina Mason Pulliam EcoLab at Marian University and the Nina Mason Pulliam Indianapolis Special Collections Room at the Indianapolis Public Library's Central Library.

== Early life and education ==
Nina G. Mason was born on September 19, 1906, in rural Morgan County, Indiana, near Martinsville, to Laura L. (Gesaman) and Benjamin Franklin Mason. She was one of the family's seven children. Nina Mason developed a lifelong love of nature and wildlife during her youth. As a teen she was diagnosed with tuberculosis and traveled on her own to the Arizona desert to live in a Phoenix home near Camelback Mountain to recover from her illness. After returning to Indiana and completing high school, she began studying journalism at Franklin College in Franklin, Indiana, but left to enroll at Indiana University, and later studied at the University of New Mexico.

== Marriage and family ==
Nina Mason married Eugene Collins Pulliam in 1941 following the death of his first wife, Myrta Smith Pulliam, in 1917, and his divorce from Marth Ott Pulliam in 1941. Mason's and Pulliam's thirty-four year marriage ended with his death in Phoenix, Arizona, in 1975 at the age of eighty-six.

Eugene Pulliam's three children from his two previous marriages included a son, Eugene Smith Pulliam (1914–1999), and two daughters, Martha Corinne Pulliam, who later married James Cline Quayle, and Helen Suzanne Pulliam, who later married William Murphy. Eugene S. Pulliam joined the family business in 1936 as news director at WIRE, an Indianapolis radio station his father owned at that time, and succeeded his father as publisher of the Indianapolis Star and the Indianapolis News in 1975. James C. and Martha C. (Pulliam) Quayle were the parents of Dan Quayle, who served as the 44th Vice President of the United States from 1989 to 1993.

== Career ==
Nina Mason began her career in journalism at Farm Life, a national magazine published in Spencer, Indiana. When the magazine ceased publication during the Great Depression, she moved to Lebanon, Indiana, where she worked at the Lebanon Reporter for newspaper publisher Eugene C. Pulliam prior to their marriage in 1941. Over the years the couple traveled extensively, including a twenty-two-nation tour in 1947. In 1953 Nina Pulliam also took a four-month solo trip to Australia, New Zealand, and the islands of Fiji. During the extended trips Nina and Eugene Pulliam filed reports of their experiences, which were published in their newspapers. In addition, she became the first woman to earn a private pilot's license in Indiana.

Pulliam's journalistic work of her travels was published in North American newspapers over a period of eleven years. Her articles were later compiled into books: Befriended Journey (1948 booklet); South America, Land of the Future, Jewel of the Past (1951), coauthored with Eugene C. Pulliam; Iron Curtain Time: The Brave Bullies. Glimpses Backstage Just Before the Storm (1956); I Traveled a Lonely Land: This is Australia and these are the Australians, as I saw them (1955); Are We Too Late in the Middle East?: On-the-scene report from Istanbul to Cairo (1958), coauthored with Eugene C. Pulliam; and We Are All in This Together (1970).

=== Newspapers executive ===
In addition to her work as a journalist, Nina Pulliam was founding secretary-treasurer and a board member of Central Newspapers, Incorporated, the company her husband formed in 1934. During her husband's sixty-three years as a newspaper publisher, he operated forty-six newspapers across the United States. Central Newspapers holdings included the Indianapolis Star, acquired in 1944; the Arizona Republic and the Phoenix Gazette, purchased in 1946; and the Indianapolis News, acquired in 1948; among others. In 1945 Pulliam discovered that she was allergic to printers' ink, which affected her vision. As a result of the affliction, she was no longer able to visit the publishing company's pressrooms and had to wait for newsprint to fully dry before touching the paper and reading its contents.

Nina and Eugene Pulliam worked together as a team in the newspaper industry until his death in 1975. Following his death, she became president of Central Newspapers, a position she retained until in 1979. Nina Pulliam also served from 1975 to 1978 as publisher of the Arizona Republic and the Phoenix Gazette, which began in 1946. Her stepson, Eugene S. Pulliam, became publisher of the company's two major newspapers in Indianapolis, the Indianapolis Star and the Indianapolis News. She stepped down as publisher of the two Arizona newspapers in 1978 and retired from Central Newspapers in 1979, at the age of seventy-three.

=== Philanthropist ===
Because an allergy to printers' ink affected her eyesight, Pulliam supported efforts to assist the blind. For twenty years she was active in the National Society to Prevent Blindness. She was also interested in Native American arts and culture as a supporter of the Heard Museum in Phoenix. Pulliam also loved animals; she and her husband were among the founders of the Phoenix Zoo. Nina Pulliam was also interested in education and joined the board of trustees at Franklin College in 1963.

In 1977 she provided funding to establish the Sigma Delta Chi Foundation's Eugene C. Pulliam Fellowship, named in honor of her late husband, who was one of the ten founding members of Sigma Delta Chi in 1909. The journalism fraternity was later renamed the Society of Professional Journalists. The first Pulliam fellowship was awarded in 1978.

The Nina Mason Pulliam Charitable Trust was established upon her death in March 1997 to continue her philanthropic legacy. In recognition of her interest in nature conservancy, the Nina Mason Pulliam EcoLab, a 55-acre (22-hectare) natural area on the Marian University campus northwest of downtown Indianapolis, was dedicated on November 13, 2009. Its facilities include the Nina Mason Pulliam Nature Center and the Nina Mason Pulliam Charitable Trust Outdoor Classroom.

== Death and legacy ==
Nina Mason Pulliam died of complications from a respiratory infection on March 26, 1997. On August 1, 2000, three years after her death and less than a year after the death of her stepson, Eugene S. Pulliam, the Gannett media company acquired the Central Newspaper holdings for US$2.6 billion, ending two generations of the Pulliam family's ownership of the newspaper firm.

During her lifetime as a journalist, author, and newspaper executive and through the Nina Mason Pulliam Charitable Trust, established after her death in 1997, she contributed to numerous philanthropic projects to support her interests in education, animals, nature, the outdoors, and Native American art and culture. The Nina Mason Pulliam Legacy Scholars, established to assist students with college expenses, is a major program for her charitable foundation. As of 2018, Indiana University – Purdue University Indianapolis and Ivy Tech Community College in Indiana, and Arizona State University and Maricopa County Community College District in Arizona are participating in the program.

== Honors and tributes ==
- A 1957 recipient of the Delta Gamma Gold Medallion Award for her contributions to conserve sight and assist the blind.
- Recipient of an honorary Doctor of Letters degree in 1963 from the University of Arizona; an honorary Doctor of Humane Letters degree from Indiana University Bloomington in 1967; and an honorary doctor of laws degree from Franklin College in Indiana in 1970.
- Elected a life member of the Heard Museum's board of trustees in 1965.
- In 1970, Pulliam became the first woman to be admitted to DePauw University's Alpha chapter of Sigma Delta Chi (present-day Society of Professional Journalists).

=== Facilities named in her honor ===
- Buildings and facilities in Indiana that are named in her honor include the Nina Mason Pulliam Indianapolis Special Collections Room at Central Library, the main branch of the Indianapolis Public Library, and the Nina Mason Pulliam EcoLab at Marion University in Indianapolis.
- In 1998 the Nina Mason Charitable Trust made a $1.5 million grant to the Heard Museum in Phoenix, Arizona, for construction of an entrance pavilion that is named in her honor as a tribute to her long time support.
- Additional buildings in Arizona named in her honor include the Nina Mason Pulliam Campus for Compassion, Arizona Humane Society; Nina Mason Pulliam Desert Research and Horticultural Center, Desert Botanical Garden, Phoenix; Plaza de los Ninos and children's entrance at the Phoenix Zoo; Nina Mason Pulliam Auditorium, Burton Barr Central Library, Phoenix; Arizona Recreation Center for the Handicapped, West Colter Street, Phoenix; Nina Mason Pulliam Rio Salado Audubon Center, Central Avenue, Phoenix; and a walking trail in the Grand Canyon National Park.

== Selected published works ==
- Befriended Journey (1948)
- South America, Land of the Future, Jewel of the Past (1951), coauthored with Eugene C. Pulliam
- Iron Curtain Time: The Brave Bullies. Glimpses Backstage Just Before the Storm (1956)
- I Traveled a Lonely Land: This is Australia and these are the Australians, as I saw them (1955)
- Are We Too Late in the Middle East?: On-the-scene report from Istanbul to Cairo (1958), coauthored with Eugene C. Pulliam
- We Are All in This Together (1970)
