= Padre (song) =

"Padre Don José"

Song by Gloria Lasso
- Released: 1956
- Songwriters: Alain Romans (music); Jacques Larue (lyrics)

"Padre"

Single by Toni Arden
- B-side: "All At Once"
- Released: April 1958
- Recorded: 1958
- Genre: Vocal pop
- Length: 3:00
- Label: Decca
- Songwriters: Alain Romans (music); Paul Francis Webster (lyrics)
- Producer: Jack Pleis

Toni Arden singles chronology
"King Size Love" (1958)	"Padre" (1958)	"You're Not Losing a Daughter, Mama" (1958)

"Padre"

Song by Elvis Presley

from the album Elvis (The "Fool" Album)
- Released: July 16, 1973 (album)
- Recorded: May 15, 1971
- Studio: RCA Studio B, Nashville
- Genre: Country
- Length: 2:30
- Label: RCA
- Songwriters: Alain Romans (music); Paul Francis Webster (lyrics)
- Producer: Felton Jarvis

"Padre Don José" is a French-language song written by Jacques Larue (fr) and Alain Romans, originally released in 1956 by Gloria Lasso.

In 1957, Paul Francis Webster wrote English lyrics for the song, titled "Padre". The following year, it was released as a single by Toni Arden. Her version peaked at number 13 on the Billboard Hot 100, and sold over million copies in the United States.

Marty Robbins reached number 5 on Billboard's Hot Country Singles chart with his version of "Padre" in 1970.

At his Brooklyn Army Terminal press conference in 1958, Elvis Presley named two songs as favorites at the time, "You'll Never Walk Alone" and recent hit single "Padre" by Toni Arden. He later recorded a cover of Arden's hit which was included on his 1973 album Elvis.

== Track listings ==
=== Toni Arden version ===
Single (1958)

1. "Padre"
2. "All At Once"
