= Elvis (1973 album) =

Studio album by Elvis Presley
- Released: July 16, 1973
- Recorded: March 1971 – March 28, 1972
- Studio: RCA, Hollywood, RCA Studio B, Nashville
- Genre: Country, pop
- Length: 25:25
- Label: RCA Victor
- Producer: Felton Jarvis

Elvis Presley chronology
Aloha From Hawaii Via Satellite (1973)	Elvis (1973)	Raised on Rock / For Ol' Times Sake (1973)

Singles from Elvis
- 1. "Fool" Released: August 3, 1973

Professional ratings
Review scores
Source	Rating
AllMusic	3/5 stars
MusicHound	2.5/5 stars
Rough Guides	2/5 stars

Elvis is the eighteenth studio album by American singer and musician Elvis Presley, released on July 16, 1973. It sold over 1 million copies worldwide. To differentiate it from his eponymous 1956 release, it is sometimes called The "Fool" Album, after its first track which appears just below Elvis' name on the front cover. In the US, "Fool" was issued as the B-side of "Steamroller Blues" from the Aloha from Hawaii Via Satellite album. In the UK the sides were flipped and "Fool" was issued as the A-side. It reached No. 15.

== Content ==
The album tracks "Fool" and "Where Do I Go From Here" were recorded in March 1972. "It's Impossible" is a live recording from the Hilton Hotel in Las Vegas from February 1972, recorded during a successful fifty-seven show season. The remaining tracks were leftovers from the March and May 1971 recording sessions at RCA's Studio B in Nashville. Three songs feature Presley on piano: "It's Still Here", "I'll Take You Home Again, Kathleen" and "I Will Be True". These three selections were all released together for a second time as part of the 1980 boxed set, Elvis Aron Presley. The song "Fool" was also released in this collection. Four other songs in this album were also reissued in other albums: "It's Impossible" (Pure Gold, 1975), "Padre" (He Walks Beside Me, 1978), "(That's What You Get) For Lovin' Me" (A Canadian Tribute, 1978) and "Don't Think Twice, It's All Right" (Our Memories Of Elvis Volume 2, 1979).

== Track listing ==
=== Original LP release ===
Side one
No.	Title	Writer(s)	Recording date	Length
1.	"Fool"	James Last, Carl Sigman	March 28, 1972	2:40
2.	"Where Do I Go from Here?"	Paul Williams	March 27–29, 1972	2:38
3.	"Love Me, Love the Life I Lead"	Roger Greenaway, Tony Macaulay	May 21, 1971	3:03
4.	"It's Still Here"	Ivory Joe Hunter	May 19, 1971	2:04
5.	"It's Impossible" (live dinner show)	Armando Manzanero, Sid Wayne	February 16, 1972	2:51

Side two
No.	Title	Writer(s)	Recording date	Length
1.	"(That's What You Get) For Lovin' Me"	Gordon Lightfoot	March 15, 1971	2:06
2.	"Padre"	Jacques Larue, Paul Francis Webster, Alain Romans	May 15, 1971	2:28
3.	"I'll Take You Home Again, Kathleen"	Thomas Paine Westendorf	May 19, 1971	2:23
4.	"I Will Be True"	Ivory Joe Hunter	May 19, 1971	2:30
5.	"Don't Think Twice, It's All Right" (edited version)	Bob Dylan	May 16, 1971	2:42

=== CD reissues ===
RCA first reissued the original 10 track album on compact disc in March 1994. The album was reissued again in 2010 in a 2 CD set with bonus material on the Follow that Dream collectors label.

FTD label Disc one
No.	Title	Length
1.	"Fool"	2:44
2.	"Where Do I Go From Here"	2:41
3.	"Love Me, Love The Life I Lead"	3:05
4.	"It's Still Here"	2:05
5.	"It's Impossible"	2:55
6.	"For Lovin' Me"	2:16
7.	"Padre"	2:30
8.	"I'll Take You Home Again Kathleen"	2:27
9.	"I Will Be True"	2:32
10.	"Don't Think Twice, It's All Right" (edited version)	2:48
11.	"Steamroller Blues" (single mix)	3:05
12.	"For The Good Times"	3:10
13.	"Until It's Time For You To Go" (remake take 10)	3:38
14.	"Love Me, Love The Life I Lead"	3:07
15.	"Padre"	2:30
16.	"Fool"	2:49
17.	"Where Do I Go From Here"	1:45
18.	"Reconsider Baby"	2:45
19.	"Blue Hawaii"	2:38
20.	"Early Mornin' Rain"	3:03
21.	"Hawaiian Wedding Song"	2:01
22.	"Ku-U-I-Po"	2:14
23.	"No More"	2:38
24.	"Fool" (single master)	2:49

Disc two
No.	Title	Length
1.	"For Lovin' Me" (take 1)	3:07
2.	"Until It's Time For You To Go" (takes 1, 2)	5:47
3.	"Love Me, Love The Life I Lead" (takes 1, 2)	5:13
4.	"Padre" (takes 1, 2)	3:32
5.	"For Lovin' Me" (takes 3, 7, 8)	4:58
6.	"It's Still Here" (takes 1, 2, 3)	4:47
7.	"I'll Take You Home Again, Kathleen" (take 1 [undubbed master])	2:24
8.	"I Will Be True" (takes 1, 2)	4:24
9.	"It's Still Here" (takes 4, 5)	5:39
10.	"Until It's Time For You To Go" (take 6)	4:56
11.	"Padre" (take 11)	2:30
12.	"Love Me, Love The Life I Lead" (takes 5, 6)	3:49
13.	"My Way" (takes 1, 2, 3 master)	3:34
14.	"My Way" (take 3 [master])	4:32
15.	"(That's What You Get) For Lovin' Me" (takes 9 &10)	4:09
16.	"Don't Think Twice, It's All Right" (long version unedited)	11:20

== Personnel ==
- Elvis Presley – lead vocals, piano
- James Burton – lead guitar
- The Sweet Inspirations – backing vocals on "It's Impossible"
- The Nashville Edition – backing vocals on "(That's What You Get) For Lovin' Me"
- Joe Babcock – backing vocals
- Kenneth A. Buttrey – drums
- Jerry Carrigan – drums
- Chip Young – rhythm guitar
- Glen D. Hardin – piano, string arrangements
- Dolores Edgin – backing vocals
- Joe Esposito – guitar, percussion
- Emory Gordy Jr. – bass on "Fool" and "Where Do I Go From Here?"
- Charlie Hodge – rhythm guitar
- Ginger Holladay – backing vocals
- The Imperials Quartet – backing vocals
- Millie Kirkham – backing vocals
- June Page – backing vocals
- Norbert Putnam – bass
- Temple Riser – backing vocals
- Jerry Scheff – bass on "It's Impossible"
- J. D. Sumner – vocals
- Ron Tutt – drums
- Hurshel Wiginton – backing vocals
- John Wilkinson – rhythm guitar on "Fool", "Where Do I Go From Here?" and "It's Impossible"
- Mary Holliday – backing vocals
- Kathy Westmoreland – backing vocals on "It's Impossible"
- Charlie McCoy – harmonica
- Joe Guercio – conductor on "It's Impossible"
- David Briggs – piano
