= John F. Ragland Jr. =

American politician

Member of the Virginia House of Delegates from Chesterfield County
- In office January 9, 1918 – January 14, 1920
- Preceded by: W. W. Baker
- Succeeded by: Harry L. Snead

Personal details
- Born: John Fendall Ragland Jr. September 26, 1874 Richmond, Virginia, U.S.
- Died: February 10, 1925 (aged 50) Richmond, Virginia, U.S.
- Party: Democratic
- Spouse: Mary Reed
- Education: Medical College of Virginia

Military service
- Allegiance: United States
- Branch/service: United States Navy
- Rank: Lieutenant
- Unit: Medical Corps
- Battles/wars: World War I

John Fendall Ragland Jr. (September 26, 1874 – February 10, 1925) was an American physician and politician who served in the Virginia House of Delegates.
