= Waverley S. Ivey =

American politician

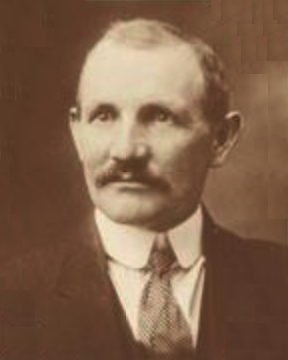

Member of the Virginia House of Delegates for Chesterfield and Powhatan
- In office January 10, 1912 – January 14, 1914
- Preceded by: David L. Toney
- Succeeded by: Berner M. Bonifant

Personal details
- Born: Waverley Spencer Ivey; March 11, 1861 Chesterfield, Virginia
- Died: September 28, 1938 (aged 77) Colonial Heights, Virginia
- Party: Democratic
- Spouse: Florence Magill (m. 1901)

Waverley Spencer Ivey (March 11, 1861 – September 28, 1938) was an American farmer and politician who served in the Virginia House of Delegates.
