= Walter A. Horner =

American politician

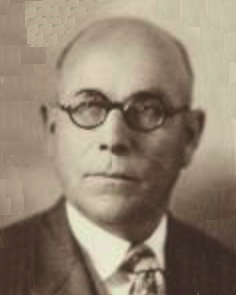

Member of the Virginia House of Delegates for Chesterfield and Powhatan
- In office January 9, 1924 – January 8, 1930
- Preceded by: Gordon W. Shepherd
- Succeeded by: Haskins Hobson

Member of the Virginia House of Delegates from Chesterfield County
- In office January 11, 1922 – January 9, 1924
- Preceded by: Harry L. Snead
- Succeeded by: None (district eliminated)

Personal details
- Born: Walter Augustus Horner; August 20, 1876 Chesterfield, Virginia, U.S.
- Died: March 28, 1950 (aged 73) Richmond, Virginia, U.S.
- Party: Democratic
- Spouses: Mollie Brown; Drucilla Zehmer

Walter Augustus Horner (August 20, 1876 – March 28, 1950) was an American farmer and politician who served in the Virginia House of Delegates.
