= E. Floyd Yates =

American politician

Member of the Virginia House of Delegates for Chesterfield and Powhatan
- In office January 10, 1940 – January 9, 1952
- Preceded by: Haskins Hobson
- Succeeded by: Edward M. Hudgins

Personal details
- Born: Elwood Floyd Yates; March 18, 1903 Charles City, Virginia, U.S.
- Died: August 31, 2010 (aged 107)
- Party: Democratic
- Spouse: Mary Ellen Bowles

Elwood Floyd Yates (March 18, 1903 – August 31, 2010) was an American automobile dealer, farmer and politician who served for over a decade in the Virginia House of Delegates(1940-1951).

== Early life and education ==
Born at Holdcroft in the Chickahominy district of Charles City County, Yates was the second of five sons (and three daughters) born to wheelwright Joseph Yates and his wife Ella. He was educated in the Charles City public schools. By 1920, his father had moved his family across the James River to Surry County, where he worked in a sawmill, and Floyd also helped by working at a local department store.

== Career ==
By 1930, Yates had married and moved with his wife upriver to Powhatan County, Virginia where he bought a farm near the county seat (Powhatan Court House), and also had an automobile and transport business. Yates also was active in the Methodist Church, Ruritan Club, Masons, Izaak Walton League and Democratic County Committee (including service as chairman). In 1939, voters in Powhatan County and Chesterfield County (directly across the James River) elected Yates to the Virginia House of Delegates (a part time position), and re-elected him five times, so he served from 1940 until 1951. Although Richmond and Chesterfield county lawyer Edward M. Hudgins succeeded Yates as the delegate representing those two then-rural counties before the U.S. Supreme Court issued its decisions in Brown v. Board of Education (which prompted Massive Resistance by the Democratic Byrd Organization), Yates represented the 11th Senatorial District (Powhatan County, as well as its western neighbors Appomattox, Buckingham, Cumberland, Amherst, Nelson and Amelia Counties) during the 1956 Virginia Constitutional Convention, which tried to implement Massive Resistance.

== Personal life ==
Yates married Mary Ellen Bowles when he was 23 years old. They had a son, E. Floyd Yates Jr. in 1930, who reached adulthood, and had a son, Elwood Floyd Yates III.

== Death and legacy ==
Yates died in 2010 at the age of 107. Powhatan State Park was partially renamed in his honor.
