= Berner M. Bonifant =

American politician

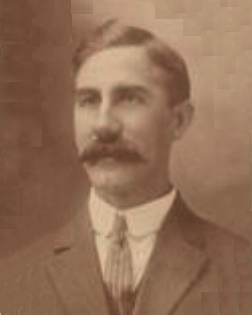

Member of the Virginia House of Delegates for Chesterfield and Powhatan
- In office January 14, 1914 – January 12, 1916
- Preceded by: Waverley S. Ivey
- Succeeded by: Emmett Lee Mann

Personal details
- Born: Berner Monroe Bonifant; May 29, 1870 Montgomery, Maryland, U.S.
- Died: May 30, 1931 (aged 61) Powhatan, Virginia, U.S.
- Party: Democratic
- Spouse: Louise Phillips (m. 1904)

Berner Monroe Bonifant (May 29, 1870 – May 30, 1931) was an American farmer and politician who served in the Virginia House of Delegates.
