= Tom Torluemke =

American artist

- Born: January 8, 1959 (age 67); Chicago, Illinois
- Known for: painting, sculpture, installation
- Movement: Contemporary Art

Tom Torluemke (born , 1959 in Chicago, Illinois) is an Indiana-based, contemporary American artist. His practice spans 30 years and includes works in painting, drawing, sculpture and installations in a variety of mediums. He is known for his powerful, no holds barred approach to subject matter relating to socio-political, ethical and humanistic themes.

== Art career ==
Torluemke studied art at a traditional art trade school in Chicago called The American Academy of Art. While studying there he excelled at working in various mediums under another influential instructor, Eugene Hall, who was the protégé of the master painter, Vladimir Zlatoff-Mirsky, who studied in Moscow under Russia's great famous painter, Ilya Repin.

Torluemke's early gallery career started with a sold-out solo exhibition in 1984 of watercolor paintings of Chicago at R.H. Love Gallery in Chicago. Torluemke was represented by Love Gallery for 12 years, during this time his work transformed from the traditional popular works, post Academy to more challenging and intense subject matter. Torluemke's experimentation with medium, technique and subject matter has made his work the subject of controversy.

Torluemke's work has been represented in more than one hundred solo, curated, and juried group shows in addition to all the other projects, awards, grants, commissions, etc. In 2002, he had a solo exhibition titled Bounce at the South Bend Regional Museum of Art in South Bend, Indiana. In 2004, he had a solo exhibition of watercolors entitled In The Company of Strangers at the Brauer Museum of Art, Valparaiso University. In 2007, he was curated into a group show at Western Michigan University, Kalamazoo, Michigan called The Inland See: Contemporary Art Around Lake Michigan, curated by esteemed art critic from Artforum, James Yood. In 2009, he had a solo exhibition of a variety of techniques of works on paper titled After Glow at the Chicago Cultural Center in Chicago. September 2010, he had a solo exhibition of his paintings, sculptures and mobiles entitled The Exhibitionist at Co-Prosperity Sphere in Chicago. Torluemke's one-man exhibition, Fearsome Fable - Tolerable Truth at Chicago's Hyde Park Art Center, January - April 2013 was selected as one of the Top 5 things to do in Chicago in January 2013

In 2007, Torluemke was awarded the Efroymson Contemporary Arts Fellowship, through the Central Indiana Community Foundation to help assist in the continued pursuit and creation of his artwork.

== Artist, Educator and Advocate ==
Torluemke began his teaching career at the North Shore Art League in Winettka, Illinois in 1984 –85. From there he began teaching art full-time at his alma mater, The American Academy of Art, Chicago, IL, where he received his BFA in 1996. During his tenure at the Academy, he inspired and led many young artists on to fulfilling creative careers. He most notably had a remarkable influence on a generation of Chicago and Northwest Indiana graffiti artists, including, Hector (Rooster) Marin, Felix (Flex) Maldonado, Jose (Chucho) Rodriguez, Christopher Tavares (Deep) Silva, Ishmael (Ish) Muhammad Nieves and others that have come after them. After leaving The American Academy, he has taught as an adjunct instructor at The School of The Art Institute's Certificate Program and at Valparaiso University in Valparaiso, Indiana. In 2001, Torluemke partnered up with Linda Dorman to promote art and arts related activities in their home community of Hammond, Indiana. Together they spearheaded numerous initiatives to provide opportunities for artists, including Arts Inside Out and interactive arts festival that ran from 2001 - 2004 in Hammond, Indiana. In 2002, they opened Uncle Freddy's Gallery in downtown Hammond, IN which closed in the fall of 2004 and reopened in Highland Indiana in fall of 2005 until Spring 2009. During the tenure of the gallery they represented cutting edge, contemporary artists from across the globe. In 2004, Uncle Freddy's was invited to participate in Art Chicago's International Invitational for young art galleries.

== Public Artwork ==
In 1998, Torluemke began to pursue public art projects and has completed numerous projects over the past decade. In 1998, Torluemke completed his moving mural entitled, The Hugging Wall, in Downtown Hammond, Indiana. In 1999 he painted a mural in Hobart, Indiana entitled The Economic History of Hobart. In 2005, he was awarded two major commissions by the Indianapolis Airport Authority to design and facilitate two terrazzo floor designs for the New Indianapolis International Airport. The designs titled, The Glory of Sports In Indianapolis and A Work Of Heart are roughly 1,000 square feet (93 m^{2}) each. The pieces were completed in 2008. In 2007, he was commissioned by the Indianapolis Marion County Public Library Foundation to paint for the Nina Mason Pulliam special collections room a mural entitled, The Book Of Life, inspired by the novel, The Magnificent Ambersons, by Booth Tarkington is 8 x 130’ long. Also in 2007, Torluemke was commissioned by Indiana State University to paint an outdoor mural on the Booker T. Washington Community Center, 18 x 54 feet (16 m). In 2008, Torluemke was a winner in the Indianapolis Art Council's Great Ideas Competition and was commissioned to execute my proposal called Light The Way to work with an underserved area in the community to make 100 large luminaries and host an event for the community. In mid-2010, he installed his first public sculpture commission, “Reaching For The Stars” at Purdue University Calumet in Hammond, Indiana. IN 2011, Torluemke painted the popular 350' mural "Simple Pleasures" for the City of Indianapolis for the 46th Super Bowl held at Lucas Oil Stadium.
