= David L. Toney =

American politician

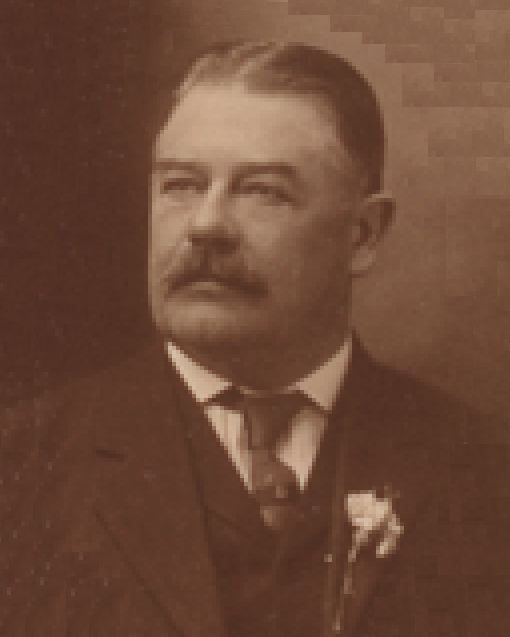

Member of the Virginia House of Delegates from Richmond City
- In office January 14, 1914 – June 23, 1914
- Preceded by: James J. Creamer
- Succeeded by: Edward R. Fuller

Member of the Virginia House of Delegates for Chesterfield, Powhatan, & Manchester
- In office January 12, 1910 – January 10, 1912
- Preceded by: Willis C. Pulliam
- Succeeded by: Waverley S. Ivey
- In office December 6, 1899 – January 13, 1904
- Preceded by: R. G. Wood
- Succeeded by: Carter H. Harrison
- In office December 2, 1891 – December 6, 1893
- Preceded by: Thomas Davis
- Succeeded by: J. M. Gregory

Personal details
- Born: David Lafayette Toney; October 1, 1857 Powhatan, Virginia, U.S.
- Died: June 23, 1914 (aged 56) Richmond, Virginia, U.S.
- Party: Democratic
- Spouse: Ida Pierce

David Lafayette Toney (October 1857 – June 23, 1914) was an American politician who served in the Virginia House of Delegates.
