= William Washington Baker =

American politician

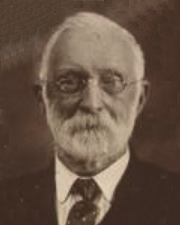

Member of the Virginia House of Delegates from Chesterfield County
- In office January 13, 1904 – January 9, 1918
- Preceded by: None (district created)
- Succeeded by: John F. Ragland Jr.

Member of the Virginia House of Delegates for Chesterfield, Manchester, and Powhatan
- In office December 6, 1899 – January 13, 1904
- Preceded by: Harry B. Owen
- Succeeded by: Carter H. Harrison
- In office December 5, 1883 – December 2, 1885
- Preceded by: William F. Giddings
- Succeeded by: Thomas M. Miller

Personal details
- Born: William Washington Baker; October 20, 1844 Chesterfield, Virginia, U.S.
- Died: February 21, 1927 (aged 82) Chesterfield, Virginia, U.S.
- Party: Democratic
- Spouse: Sarah Thomas Martin
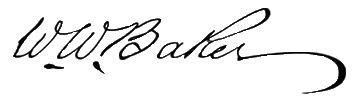
- Signature

Military service
- Allegiance: Confederate States
- Branch/service: Confederate States Navy; Confederate States Army
- Years of service: 1863–1865
- Unit: 25th Virginia Infantry
- Battles/wars: American Civil War

William Washington Baker (October 20, 1844 – February 21, 1927) was an American Democratic politician who served as a member of the Virginia House of Delegates, representing his native Chesterfield County.

Virginia House of Delegates
Preceded by William F. Giddings	Virginia Delegate for Chesterfield, Manchester, and Powhatan; 1883–1885; 1899–1904	Succeeded by Thomas M. Miller
Preceded by Harry B. Owen	Virginia Delegate for Chesterfield, Manchester, and Powhatan; 1883–1885; 1899–1904	Succeeded by Carter H. Harrison
Preceded by None	Virginia Delegate for Chesterfield County; 1904–1918	Succeeded by John F. Ragland, Jr.
