= Pure Gold (Elvis Presley album) =

Compilation album by Elvis Presley
- Released: 1975
- Recorded: 1956–1972
- Genre: Rock and roll
- Length: 26:34
- Label: RCA Records
- Producer: Ethel Gabriel

Elvis Presley chronology
Promised Land (1975)	Pure Gold (1975)	Today (1975)

Pure Gold is a compilation album by American singer and musician Elvis Presley, issued in 1975 by RCA Records with catalog number ANL1-0971(e) as part of the RCA budget Pure Gold series of albums. At the time of this release, Presley was at the final stage of his career; he was focused more on the country music market, where he had a string of chart-topping records in recent years. This short and rather haphazard collection focused more on Presley's earlier Rock and Roll material than later hits, though a few of them are included. Generally considered a mediocre compilation at best, Pure Gold became an enormous seller in the wake of Elvis' unexpected death in August, 1977.

== Content ==
"Fever", "It's Impossible", and "In The Ghetto" are heard in true stereo; "Kentucky Rain" utilized the mono single version, with mild rechanneled or "fake stereo" effect. The other six tracks on the album are original 1950s monophonic recordings with "stereo effect reprocessed from monophonic", or "fake stereo". When RCA reissued the album on compact disc in 1992, the tracks in reprocessed stereo were restored to their original mono sound. The album was certified Gold on September 12, 1977, Platinum on May 20, 1988, and 2× Platinum on March 27, 1992, by the RIAA.

The front cover photo features Elvis from his Aloha from Hawaii concert in January, 1973. The original back cover featured a listing of other RCA albums available in the Pure Gold series. In 1980, the album was reissued under a new catalog number AYL1-3732(e), now part of the RCA budget "Best Buy" series.

== Track listing ==
Side A
No.	Title	Writer(s)	Recording date	Length
1.	"Kentucky Rain"	Eddie Rabbitt and Dick Heard	February 19, 1969	3:14
2.	"Fever" (from Elvis Is Back!)	Eddie Cooley and Otis Blackwell	April 3, 1960	3:31
3.	"It's Impossible" (from Elvis)	Armando Manzanero, Sid Wayne	February 16, 1972	2:51
4.	"Jailhouse Rock" (from Jailhouse rock)	Jerry Leiber and Mike Stoller	April 30, 1957	2:23
5.	"Don't Be Cruel"	Otis Blackwell and Elvis Presley	July 2, 1956	2:04

Side B
No.	Title	Writer(s)	Recording date	Length
1.	"I Got a Woman" (from Elvis Presley)	Ray Charles and Renald Richard	January 10, 1956	2:25
2.	"All Shook Up"	Otis Blackwell and Elvis Presley	January 12, 1957	1:57
3.	"Loving You" (from Loving You)	Jerry Leiber and Mike Stoller	February 24, 1957	2:12
4.	"In the Ghetto" (from From Elvis in Memphis)	Mac Davis	January 20, 1969	2:20
5.	"Love Me Tender" (from Love Me Tender)	Vera Matson and Elvis Presley	August 24, 1956	2:41
