= Emmett Lee Mann =

American politician

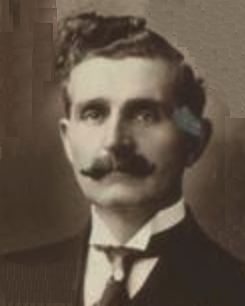

Member of the Virginia House of Delegates for Chesterfield and Powhatan
- In office January 12, 1916 – January 14, 1920
- Preceded by: Berner M. Bonifant
- Succeeded by: Gordon W. Shepherd

Personal details
- Born: Emmett Lee Mann; September 22, 1871 Chesterfield, Virginia, U.S.
- Died: July 18, 1923 (aged 51) Richmond, Virginia, U.S.
- Party: Democratic
- Spouse: Mary Clayton

Emmett Lee Mann (September 22, 1871 – July 18, 1923) was an American politician who served in the Virginia House of Delegates.
