= I'll Take You Home Again, Kathleen =

Song
- Written: 1875
- Published: 1876 by John Church Company
- Genre: Traditional pop
- Songwriter: Thomas P. Westendorf

"I'll Take You Home Again, Kathleen" is a traditional pop song written by Thomas Paine Westendorf (1848–1923) in 1875. The music is loosely based on Felix Mendelssohn's Violin Concerto in E Minor Opus 64 Second Movement. In spite of its German-American origins, it is widely mistaken to be an Irish ballad.

Westendorf, born in Bowling Green, Virginia of German parents, was then teaching at the reform school known as the Indiana House of Refuge for Juvenile Offenders in Hendricks County, Indiana. He wrote it for his wife (who was, however, named Jane Harrow), who had made a visit to her home state of New York due to homesickness. It is an answer song to a popular ballad of the time, "Barney, Take Me Home Again," composed by Westendorf’s close friend, George W. Brown, writing under the nom de plume of George W. Persley.

== Recorded versions ==
- A version by Will Oakland on Edison Amberol (catalog 1102) was popular in 1912.
- On 30 January 2011 Jon Boden released a version as part of his A Folk Song a Day project.
- On March 31, 1971 Johnny Cash sang a version of this song on the 56th episode of his television show The Johnny Cash Show.
- Frank Connors (released by Varsity Records) as catalog number 519, with the B‑side "When Irish Eyes Are Smiling".
- Eugene Conley, American operatic tenor, recorded a version released by London Records.
- Michael Crawford performed the song for his album In Concert in 1998, and also in his concert tour.
- Bing Crosby and John Scott Trotter's Orchestra (recorded on July 17, 1945, released by Decca Records as catalog numbers 18721B and 28261, both with the B-side "The Bells of St. Mary's"; also as catalog number 23789B with the B-side "Too-Ra-Loo-Ra-Loo-Ral").
- Merv Griffin (released by RCA Victor Records as catalog number 20-4749, with the B-side "Wild Colonial Boy").
- Irish tenor Josef Locke recorded a version around the late 1940s.
- Danny Malone (recorded November 27, 1934, released by Decca Records as catalog number 12052A, with the B-side "All That I Want Is in Ireland").
- Mitch Miller – Favorite Irish Folk Songs – Originally released in 1959 (now Sony BMG MUSIC ENTERTAINMENT – USSM10020418).
- Henry Moeller (released by Gennett Records as catalog number 10069, with the B-side "Sing Me To Sleep").
- Popular English-born singer Cavan O'Connor recorded and regularly performed the song.
- British novelty pop band Lieutenant Pigeon (released by Decca Records in 1974 as Decca F13486), with the B-side "Big Butch Baby", reached #3 in Australia.
- Elvis Presley recorded a version in 1971 of him singing to his own piano-playing released (with overdubbed accompaniment) on the 1973 self-titled album called Elvis on RCA Records, better known as The Fool album. He can be seen rehearsing the song by himself in the 1981 documentary This Is Elvis as taken from the footage for the 1970 film That's the Way It Is. He can also be heard performing the same song while in the Army while stationed in Germany in the so-called "Bad Nauheim Medley" of the 1997 RCA CD boxset Platinum: A Life In Music.
- Oscar Seagle (recorded in September 1915, released by Columbia Records as catalog number A-5718, with the B-side "The Bloom Is on the Rye").
- Vaughan Quartet (released by Vaughan Records as catalog number 725, with the B-side "When Honey Sings an Old Time Song").
- Tenor and Chorus with Orchestra, Walter Van Brunt. Edison Diamond Disc, 1914, Disc 80160-R. B-side "On The Banks of the Brandywine".
- Lew White (released by Victor Records as catalog number 27467, with the B-side "On the Wings of Song").
- Clarence Whitehill (recorded on July 30, 1914, released by Victor Records as catalog number 74425 (a single-sided record); also as catalog number 1275, with the B-side "In the Gloaming").
- Victor Young and his Orchestra (released by Decca Records as catalog number 28194, with the B-side "My Mother").
- Slim Whitman recorded a version in 1957, on Imperial 8310, also issued in the UK on London HLP 8403.
- Daniel O'Donnell recorded the song, where it was released on the album, he Daniel O'Donnell Irish Collection, in 1996.
- Scottish tenor Robert Wilson released a version in the late 1940s.
- Dexys (a.k.a. Dexys Midnight Runners) recorded a version for their 2016 UK Top 10 album Let The Record Show: Dexys Do Irish And Country Soul.
- Being a well-documented song publicised by EFDSS, and Mainly Norfolk, the song was recorded by Oli Steadman for inclusion in "365 Days Of Folk".

== Popular culture ==
- The song was used in the radio program "Orphans of Divorce"
- Arrangements of the song where used in films "Mrs. Parkington" and "Magic Town"
- In the second series episode "Antony's Birthday" of the British TV series The Royle Family, the family's neighbor Joe Carroll (played by Peter Martin), normally quiet and retiring, gives a well-received rendition of the song.
- In the Star Trek (TOS) episode, "The Naked Time" (first aired on September 29, 1966), the crew of the Enterprise is affected by a substance, unknowingly picked up from an uninhabited, frozen planet named Psi 2000 about to break up, which brings repressed feelings and behavior to the surface. One crewman, Lt. Kevin Thomas Riley, who "fancies himself a descendant of Irish kings" (as described by Science Officer Spock), locks himself in Engineering and shuts the engines off, causing the ship to decay its orbit toward the disintegrating planet. While the behavior-altering disease spreads throughout the ship and the ship continues to fall toward the planet, Riley adds to the stress by repeatedly singing, "I'll Take You Home Again, Kathleen" in a half-drunken manner through ship-wide communication speakers.
- From the Argosy picture "Rio Grande," directed by John Ford, 1950. The Sons of the Pioneers as the regimental singers, with lead vocalist Ken Curtis, serenade Maureen O'Hara as Kathleen Yorke.
- In Friday the 13th Part VI: Jason Lives the drunken gardener sings this song.
