= Harry L. Snead =

American politician

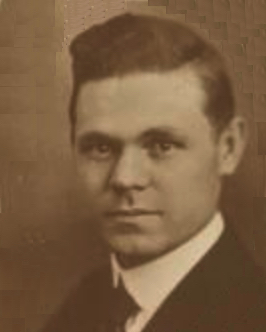

Member of the Virginia House of Delegates from Chesterfield County
- In office January 14, 1920 – January 11, 1922
- Preceded by: John F. Ragland Jr.
- Succeeded by: Walter A. Horner

Personal details
- Born: Harry Lamont Snead; February 27, 1890 Fork Union, Virginia, U.S.
- Died: July 20, 1979 (aged 89) Richmond, Virginia, U.S.
- Party: Democratic
- Spouse: Eva Oden Nicol (m. 1913)
- Education: Richmond College (BA, LLB)

Harry Lamont Snead (February 27, 1890 – July 20, 1979) was an American physician and politician who served in the Virginia House of Delegates.
