= Gordon W. Shepherd =

American politician

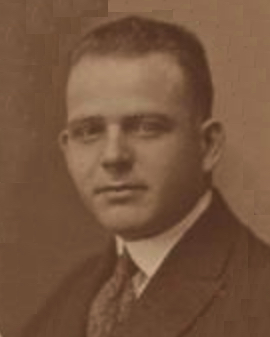

Member of the Virginia House of Delegates for Chesterfield and Powhatan
- In office January 14, 1920 – January 9, 1924
- Preceded by: Emmett Lee Mann
- Succeeded by: Walter A. Horner

Personal details
- Born: Gordon Williamson Shepherd; September 21, 1897 Sussex, Virginia, U.S.
- Died: December 9, 1978 (aged 81) Richmond, Virginia, U.S.
- Party: Democratic
- Spouse: Hazel Lanier
- Education: Richmond College

Gordon Williamson Shepherd (September 21, 1897 – December 9, 1978) was an American attorney and politician who served in the Virginia House of Delegates.
