= Haskins Hobson =

American politician (1877–1954)

Member of the Virginia House of Delegates for Chesterfield and Powhatan
- In office January 8, 1930 – January 10, 1940
- Preceded by: Walter A. Horner
- Succeeded by: E. Floyd Yates

Personal details
- Born: April 2, 1877 Powhatan, Virginia, U.S.
- Died: February 10, 1954 (aged 76) Richmond, Virginia, U.S.
- Party: Democratic
- Spouse: Lena Amonette Rudd
- Education: Richmond College

Haskins Hobson (April 2, 1877 – February 10, 1954) was an American attorney and politician who served in the Virginia House of Delegates.
