= Willis C. Pulliam =

American politician (1878–1952)

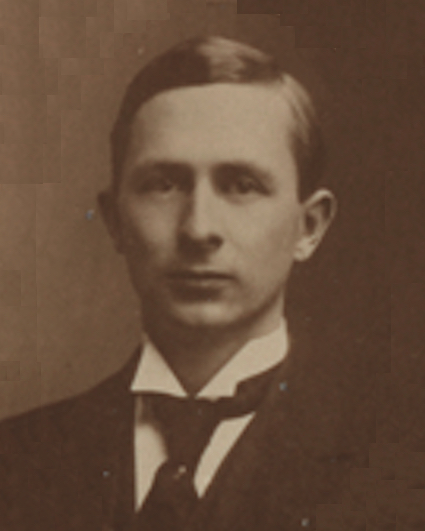

Member of the Virginia House of Delegates for Chesterfield, Powhatan, & Manchester
- In office January 10, 1906 – January 12, 1910
- Preceded by: Carter H. Harrison
- Succeeded by: David L. Toney

Personal details
- Born: Willis Clopton Pulliam; January 14, 1878 Chester, Virginia, United States
- Died: August 2, 1952 (aged 74) Staunton, Virginia, U.S.
- Party: Democratic
- Spouse: Edith Hyde (m. 1906)
- Education: Richmond College (LLB)

Willis Clopton Pulliam (January 14, 1878 – August 2, 1952) was an American politician who served in the Virginia House of Delegates.
