= Gloria Lasso =

Spanish-born French canción melódica singer

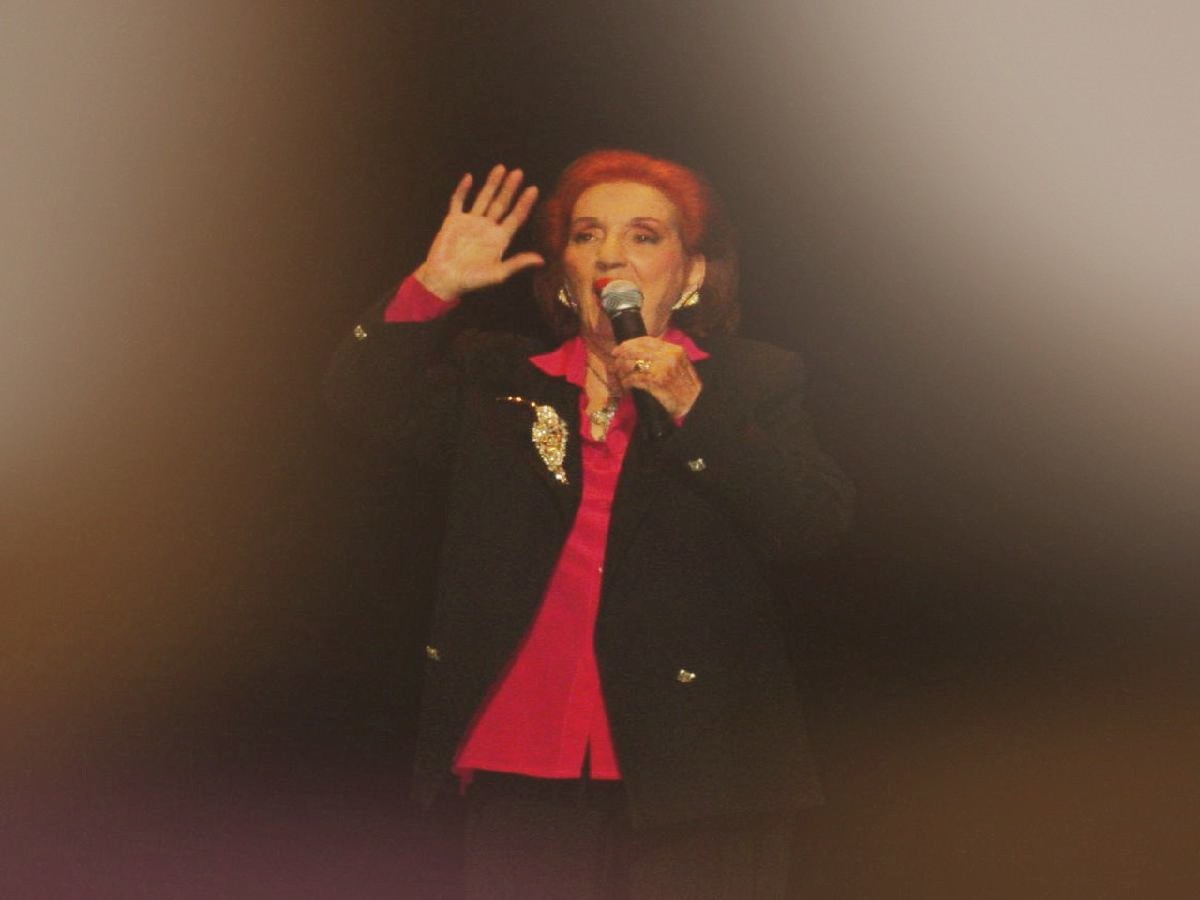
- Lasso in 2003
- Born: Rosa Vicenta Montserrat Coscolín Figueras; 25 October 1922; Vilafranca del Penedès (Barcelona), Spain
- Died: 4 December 2005 (aged 83); Cuernavaca, Mexico

Signature
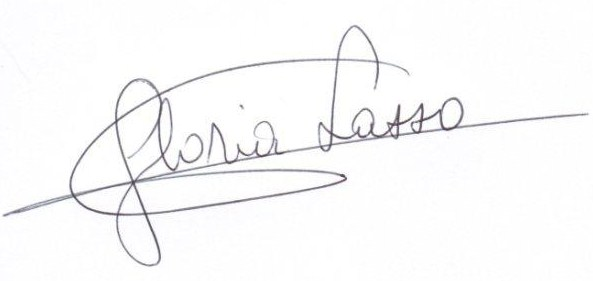

Rosa Vicenta Montserrat Coscolín Figueras (28 October 1922 – 4 December 2005) known professionally as Gloria Lasso was a Spanish-born canción melódica singer, long based in France. In the 1950s, she was one of the major competitors to Dalida.

Born in Vilafranca del Penedès (Barcelona) in Catalonia, Spain, she achieved a degree of fame and success in the 1950s and 1960s, with songs such as Amour, castagnettes et tango (1955), Etranger au paradis (1956, a French version of Stranger in paradise by Tony Bennett), Buenas noches mi amor (1957) and Bon voyage (1958).

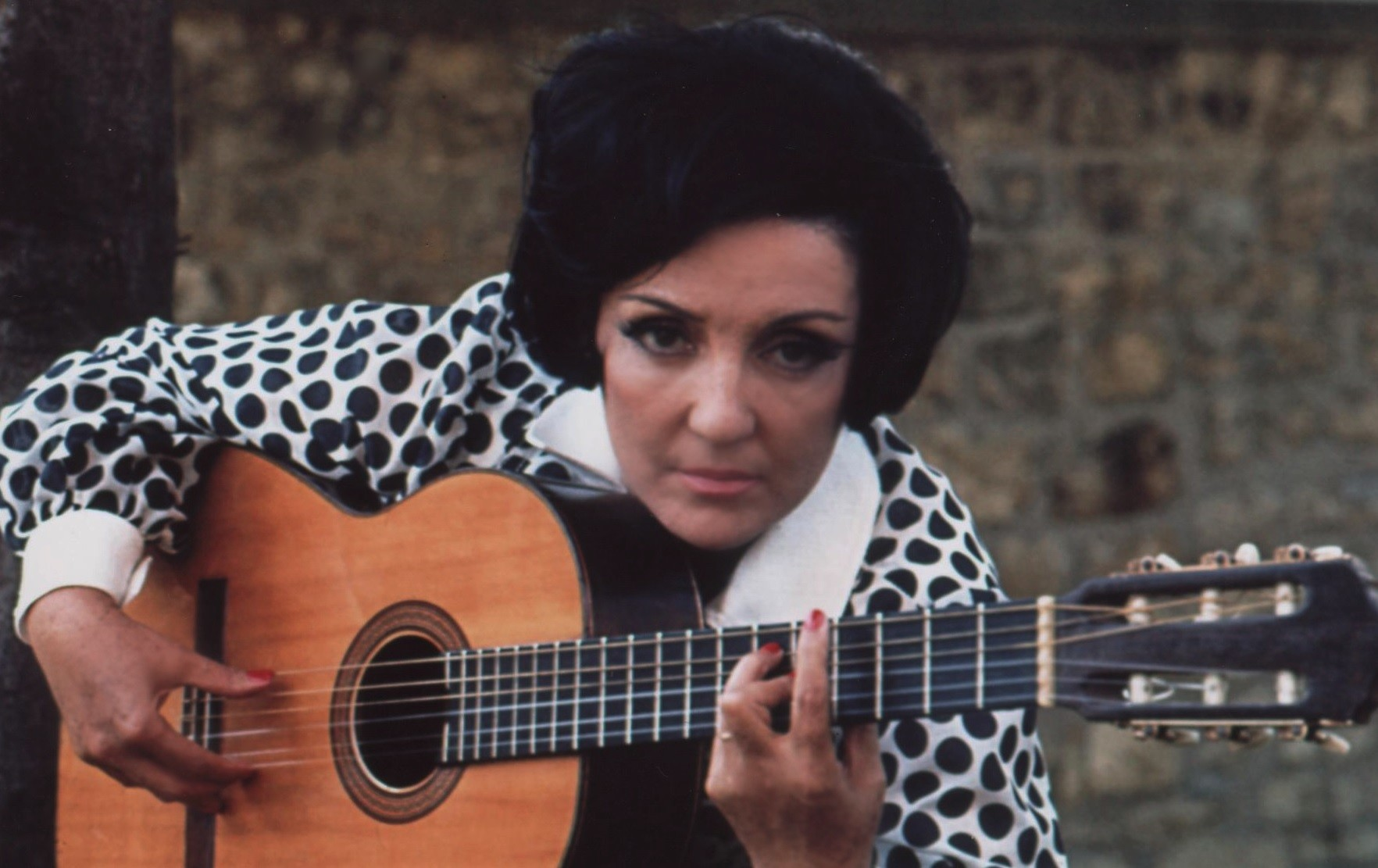
Lasso in Paris, 1973

Eventually superseded by Dalida, she moved to Mexico, but attempted a comeback to France in 1985 performing at the Paris Olympia. She was reportedly married six times.

She died from a myocardial infarction, aged 83, at her Cuernavaca, Mexico home.

== Chart positions (France) ==
=== Albums ===
- 1955 Le tour de chant de Gloria Lasso À L'Olympia (La Voix de son Maître) – 10" LP
- 1956 Gloria Lasso Chante En Espagnol (La Voix De Son Maître) – 10" LP

=== Singles ===
- 1955 – Étrangère au Paradis – #2
- 1956 – Dolorès – #7
- 1956 – Toi mon démon – #8
- 1956 – Mandolino – #11
- 1956 – Amour, castagnettes et tango – #5
- 1956 – La fête Brésilienne – #41
- 1956 – Malaguena – #45
- 1956 – La cueillette du coton – #16
- 1956 – Lisbon Antigua – #3
- 1956 – Adieu Lisbonne – #20
- 1957 – Bambino – #6
- 1957 – Le torrent – #3
- 1957 – Canastos (duet with Luis Mariano) – #3
- 1957 – Amour perdu – #18
- 1957 – Buenas noches mi amor – #7
- 1957 – Marianne – #12
- 1957 – Padre Don José – #46
- 1957 – Histoire d'un amour – #17
- 1958 – Gondolier – #10
- 1958 – Bon voyage – #15
- 1958 – Diana – #10
- 1958 – Ça c'est l'amour – #27
- 1958 – Sarah – #46
- 1958 – Je t'aimerai, t'aimerai – #22
- 1959 – Bonjour, chéri – #22
- 1959 – Vénus – #1 (for 5 weeks)
- 1959 – La chanson d'Orphée – #6
- 1959 – Sois pas fâché – #21
- 1960 – Valentino – #5
- 1960 – Adios Muchachos / Acercate Mas
- 1961 – Pépito – #15
- 1961 – Le goût de la violence – #32
- 1961 – Oui devant Dieu – #56
- 1962 – Et maintenant – #17
- 1962 – Magali – #35
