= Harvey M. Watterson =

American politician (1811–1891)

Member of the U.S. House of Representatives from Tennessee's 9th district
- In office March 4, 1839 – March 3, 1843
- Preceded by: James K. Polk
- Succeeded by: Cave Johnson

Member of the Tennessee Senate
- In office 1845–1847

Member of the Tennessee House of Representatives
- In office 1835

Personal details
- Born: Harvey Magee Watterson; November 23, 1811 Bedford County, Tennessee, U.S.
- Died: October 1, 1891 (aged 79) Louisville, Kentucky, U.S.
- Resting place: Cave Hill Cemetery; Louisville, Kentucky, U.S.
- Party: Democratic
- Profession: Lawyer; newspaperman; politician

Harvey Magee Watterson (November 23, 1811 – October 1, 1891) was an American lawyer, newspaper editor, and politician. Watterson was what his only child Henry later described as an "undoubting Democrat of the schools of Jefferson and Jackson", active in Tennessee politics at both the state and federal level.

== Biography ==
Watterson was born in Bedford County, Tennessee. He pursued classical studies, studied law at Cumberland College in Princeton, Kentucky, was admitted to the bar, and commenced practice in Shelbyville, Tennessee.

== Career ==
Watterson established and edited a newspaper in Shelbyville in 1831. He was a member of the Tennessee House of Representatives in 1835.

Elected as a Democrat to the Twenty-sixth and Twenty-seventh Congresses, representing Tennessee's ninth district in the U.S. House of Representatives, Watterson served from March 4, 1839, to March 3, 1843. His son Henry described those years in his autobiography:

Immediately succeeding Mr. Polk, and such a youth in appearance, he attracted instant attention. His father, my grandfather, allowed him a larger income than was good for him — seeing that the per diem then paid Congressmen was altogether insufficient — and during the earlier days of his sojourn in the national capital he cut a wide swath; his principal yokemate in the pleasures and dissipations of those times being Franklin Pierce, at first a representative and then a senator from New Hampshire. Fortunately for both of them, they were whisked out of Washington by their families in 1843.

Watterson was sent by President John Tyler on a diplomatic mission to Buenos Aires, where he remained for two years. From 1845 to 1847, he was a member of the Tennessee Senate and served as speaker.

The editor and proprietor of the Nashville Union from 1847 to 1851, Watterson was also the editor of the Washington Union starting in 1851. With his friend Pierce's election as President of the United States in 1853, the Washington Union became the "organ of the Administration." Again according to Watterson's son, the two's "rather conspicuous frivolity" resumed:

[T]he national capital was still rife with stories of their escapades. One that I recall had it that on a certain occasion returning from an excursion late at night my father missed his footing and fell into the canal that then divided the city, and that Pierce, after many fruitless efforts, unable to assist him to dry land, exclaimed, "Well, Harvey, I can't get you out, but I'll get in with you," suiting the action to the word. And there they were found and rescued by a party of passers, very well pleased with themselves.

Watterson was a delegate to the Democratic National Convention at Baltimore, Maryland in 1860, and was a presidential elector on the Douglas ticket for that year's presidential election. After the Civil War, he was appointed by President Andrew Johnson as one of a commission to investigate the behavior in the states "lately in rebellion."

Watterson practiced law in Washington, D.C. for fourteen years. He moved to Louisville, Kentucky and was a member of the editorial staff of the Louisville Courier-Journal, the newspaper edited by his son Henry.

== Death ==
Watterson died in Louisville on October 1, 1891. He is interred at Cave Hill Cemetery.

U.S. House of Representatives
Preceded by James K. Polk	Member of the U.S. House of Representatives from Tennessee's 9th congressional district 1839 – 1843	Succeeded by Cave Johnson
