= Myrta Pulliam =

American journalist (born 1947)

- Born: Myrta Jane Pulliam; June 20, 1947 (age 78); Indianapolis, Indiana, U.S.
- Parent(s): Eugene S. Pulliam; Jane Bleecker
- Relatives: Eugene C. Pulliam (grandfather); Dan Quayle (cousin)

Myrta Jane Pulliam (born June 20, 1947) is an American journalist.

== Biography ==
Pulliam was born in Indianapolis, Indiana. She is the granddaughter of Eugene C. Pulliam, the former publisher of The Indianapolis Star, and the daughter of Eugene S. Pulliam, Star publisher from 1975 to 1999. Pulliam has worked as a journalist in Indianapolis and in Phoenix.

A co-founder of Investigative Reporters and Editors, Inc., Pulliam is also a past board member.

Pulliam is a cousin of former Vice President Dan Quayle and a first cousin, once removed, of former U.S. representative Ben Quayle. Her niece is the Washington Post journalist Sarah Pulliam Bailey. Pulliam has served on the Board of Trustees of DePauw University and Newfields.

== Awards ==
Pulliam worked on a 1974 Star series that uncovered "local police corruption and dilatory law enforcement, resulting in a cleanup of both the Police Department and the office of the County Prosecutor." It was awarded the Pulitzer Prize for Local Investigative Specialized Reporting, in 1975.
