= Indianapolis News =

Defunct newspaper in Indiana, US (1869–1999)

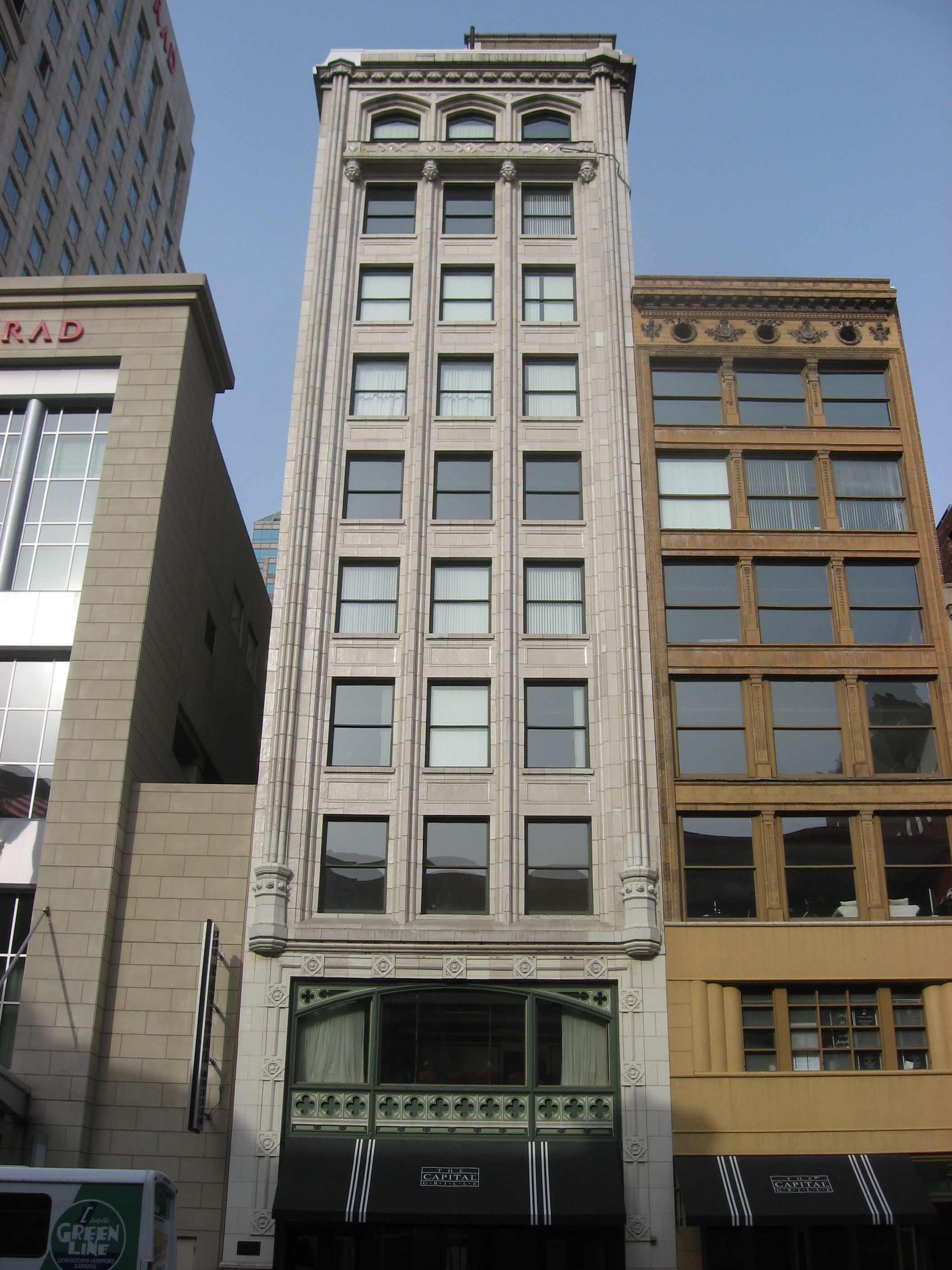
Former headquarters building for the News

The Indianapolis News was an evening newspaper published for 130 years, beginning December 7, 1869, and ending on October 1, 1999.

The "Great Hoosier Daily," as it was known, at one time held the largest circulation in the state of Indiana. It was also the oldest Indianapolis newspaper until it closed and was housed in the Indianapolis News Building from 1910 to 1949. After Eugene C. Pulliam, the founder and president of Central Newspapers acquired the News in 1948, he became its publisher, while his son, Eugene S. Pulliam, served as the newspaper's managing editor. Eugene S. Pulliam succeeded his father as publisher of the News in 1975.

The Indianapolis News was an evening paper, and its decline matched a growing circulation of the morning newspaper, the Indianapolis Star. Prior to the closing, there had been a partial merging of the newspaper staff with the Star.

== Notable staff members ==
- Grace Alexander (1872–1951) was a society editor for the Indianapolis News (1891–1903). She wrote all of the musical criticisms, as well as much of the dramatic comment. She also focused on the weekly women's section. She also wrote a play, some novels, and co-authored children's textbooks with her sister.
- Medford Stanton Evans (1934–2015) was an award-winning journalist, educator, and author who became the head editorial writer for the News in 1959. He was promoted to editor of the News in 1960, at the age twenty-six, and became the youngest editor of a metropolitan daily newspaper at that time. Because of his editorial at the News, Evans was selected in 1960 to draft the Sharon Statement, which outlined the founding principles for the Young Americans for Freedom. The conservative writer remained as editor of the News through 1974, when he left the city and became a nationally syndicated columnist for The Los Angeles Times. Evans also taught journalism as Troy University in Troy, Alabama, for more than thirty years. Among his many other activities, Evans lead the American Conservative Union from 1971 to 1977, authored several books, and founded the National Journalism Center in 1977 in Washington, D.C.
- Frank McKinney "Kin" Hubbard (1868–1930) was a nationally known American cartoonist, humorist, and journalist whose most famous work was the Abe Martin cartoon series. Hubbard introduced his Abe Martin character to Indianapolis News readers on December 17, 1904, and it appeared six days a week on the back page of the newspaper for twenty-six years. Hubbard also originated and illustrated a once-a-week humor essay for the "Short Furrows" column in the Sunday edition. The Abe Martin cartoon series went into national print syndication in 1910 and the "Short Furrows" column went into syndication the following year. For years after Hubbard's death in 1930, the News and other newspapers continued to print his Abe Martin cartoon series.
- Eugene S. Pulliam (1914–1999) began working at the News as its managing editor in 1948 and rose through the managerial ranks to become assistant publisher of the Indianapolis News and the Star in 1962. He succeeded his father, Eugene C. Pulliam, as publisher of both newspapers in 1975. Known for his advocacy for First Amendment rights and freedom of the press, Eugene S. Pulliam remained the publisher of the News and the Star until his death in 1999. He also became president of Central Newspapers in 1979 following the death of his stepmother, Nina Mason Pulliam.
- Juliet V. Strauss (1863–1918) was a well-known journalist, author, and public speaker from Rockville, Indiana, who wrote a regular weekly column for the News using the pseudonym of "The Country Contributor" from November 1903 until her death in May 1918. Strauss also was a leader in efforts to generate public and state government support to establish Turkey Run State Park in Parke County, Indiana, in 1916 as Indiana's second state park. She began her journalism career as a regular newspaper columnist at the Rockville Tribune in 1893. In addition to her regular newspaper columns, Strauss authored "The Ideas of a Plain Country Woman," a monthly column for the Ladies' Home Journal from 1905 until 1918. She was also a founder in 1913 of the Woman's Press Club of Indiana.
