= Eugene C. Pulliam =

American newspaper publisher (1889–1975)

- Born: Eugene Collins Pulliam; May 3, 1889; Ulysses, Kansas, U.S.
- Died: June 23, 1975 (aged 86); Phoenix, Arizona, U.S.
- Resting place: Lebanon, Indiana, U.S.
- Education: DePauw University
- Occupations: Newspaper publisher, businessman
- Board member of: DePauw University, Associated Press, New York Central Railroad
- Spouses: Myrta Smith (m. 1912; died 1917) Martha Ott (m. 1919; div. 1941) Nina Mason (m. 1941)
- Children: 3, including Eugene and Martha
- Relatives: Dan Quayle (grandson), Myrta Pulliam (granddaughter)

Eugene Collins Pulliam (May 3, 1889 – June 23, 1975) was an American newspaper publisher and businessman who was the founder and president of Central Newspapers Inc., a media holding company. During his sixty-three years as a newspaper publisher, Pulliam acquired forty-six newspapers across the United States. Major holdings of Central Newspapers, which he founded in 1934, included the Indianapolis Star, the Indianapolis News, the Arizona Republic, and the Phoenix Gazette, as well as newspapers in smaller cities in Indiana, Arizona, and other states. Pulliam's early career included work as a reporter for the Kansas City Star and as editor and publisher of the Atchison (Kansas) Daily Champion. Prior to 1960 Pulliam also operated radio stations WAOV and WIRE in Indiana and KTAR in Arizona. The Kansas native, a graduate from DePauw University in 1910, founded the DePauw Daily, an independent student newspaper, and in 1909 was one of ten DePauw students who cofounded Sigma Delta Chi, a journalism fraternity that was later renamed the Society of Professional Journalists. In August 2000, the Gannett Company acquired Central Newspapers for US$2.6 billion, with the Eugene C. Pulliam Trust as the principal beneficiary of the sale.

Well known as a political conservative, Pulliam was a delegate to the Republican national convention in 1952 that named General Dwight D. Eisenhower as the Republican Party's presidential nominee. Pulliam was also an outspoken advocate of freedom of the press. Pulliam wrote and published "Window on the Right," a syndicated domestic-affairs column during the 1960s; wrote The Unchanging Responsibility of the American Newspaper in a Changing Society (1970); The People and the Press: Partners for Freedom (1965), coauthored with Frederic S. Marquardt; and South America, Land of the Future, Jewel of the Past (1951), coauthored with his wife, Nina Mason Pulliam. Pulliam was the father of newspaper publisher Eugene Smith Pulliam; Martha Corinne (Pulliam) Quayle, the mother of Dan Quayle, the 44th Vice President of the United States; and Helen Suzanne (Pulliam) Murphy. He was a trustee of DePauw University, a three-term member the Associated Press's board of directors, and a member of New York Central Railroad's board of directors, as well as a founder of the Phoenix Zoo.

== Early life and education ==
Pulliam was born on May 3, 1889, in a sod dugout house at Ulysses in Grant County, Kansas, to Martha Ellen (Collins) and Reverend Irvin Brown Pulliam, who was a Methodist missionary sent to establish church congregations in the frontier towns of western Kansas. The Pulliam family moved frequently and Eugene grew up in a variety of prairie towns. He got his first taste of the newspaper business as a six-year-old boy selling newspapers in Chanute, Kansas.

Pulliam entered DePauw University in Greencastle, Indiana, in 1906. While a student at DePauw, Pulliam was a campus correspondent for the Indianapolis Star, a member of the Psi Phi chapter of Delta Kappa Epsilon fraternity, and founder of the DePauw Daily, an independent student newspaper. He was also a cofounder, in 1909, with nine other students at DePauw of Sigma Delta Chi, a journalism fraternity that was later renamed the Society of Professional Journalists. Pulliam graduated from DePauw in 1910. Later in life he served for thirty-two years as a member of DePauw's board of trustees and also chaired a committee that had a monument erected outside of DePauw's East College to commemorate the founding of Sigma Delta Chi.

== Marriage and family ==
Eugene C. Pulliam married Myrta Smith, a former college classmate, in 1912. Their son, Eugene S. Pulliam, was born on September 7, 1914, and joined the family business in 1935 as director of WIRE, an Indianapolis radio station his father owned at that time. Myrta (Smith) Pulliam died in 1917. Eugene Smith Pulliam died on January 20, 1999.

Eugene C. Pulliam married Martha Ott (1891–1991) of Franklin, Indiana, in 1919; they divorced in 1941. Eugene and Martha Pulliam were the parents of two daughters, Martha Corinne Pulliam, who later married James Cline Quayle, and Helen Suzanne Pulliam, who later married William Murphy. Martha (Ott) Pulliam, a graduate of Franklin College, was publisher of the Lebanon (Indiana) Reporter from the early 1940s to December 1990. She died in 1991. James and Martha C. (Pulliam) Quayle were the parents of Dan Quayle (Eugene C. Pulliam's grandson), who served as the 44th vice president of the United States from 1989 to 1993.

Following his divorce from Martha (Ott) Pulliam in 1941 Eugene C. Pulliam married Nina G. Mason (1906–1997). During their thirty-four-year marriage, which ended upon his death in 1975, Nina (Mason) Pulliam served as secretary-treasurer and a board member of Central Newspapers, Inc., the holding company that Eugene Pulliam founded in 1934. Eugene and Nina Pulliam also traveled extensively, including a twenty-two-nation tour in 1947. During their extended trips they filed reports of their experiences, which were published in the Pulliam newspapers. They also coauthored South America, Land of the Future, Jewel of the Past (1951). Nina (Mason) Pulliam died on March 26, 1997.

== Career ==
=== Early career ===
After graduating from DePauw University in 1910, Pulliam moved to Atchison, Kansas, where he began working at the Atchison Daily Champion. A few months later, he received a job to become a reporter at the Kansas City Star, at that time the largest newspaper in the lower Midwest, and moved to Kansas City. In 1912, at the age of twenty-three, Pulliam returned to Atchison to become the editor and publisher of the Daily Champion. He is believed to have been one of the youngest newspaper editors in the United States at that time. With financial backing from his first wife's family, Pulliam purchased the Daily Champion, which was the first of forty-six newspapers he eventually owned. In 1915, Pulliam sold the Daily Champion and bought the Franklin (Indiana) Star. In 1923, he sold the Franklin Star and purchased the Lebanon (Indiana) Reporter.

=== Publisher ===
After moving to Oklahoma in 1929, Pulliam bought six newspapers and established the Oklahoma Newspapers, Inc. During the Great Depression, Pulliam operated twenty-three newspapers and in 1930 became president of Vincennes Newspapers, the predecessor to Central Newspapers, Inc., a holding company he formed in 1934. During his sixty-three years as a newspaper publisher, Pulliam operated forty-six newspapers. He subsequently expanded his holdings through acquisitions of newspapers in the eastern United States (in Massachusetts, New Jersey, and Pennsylvania), in the southeast (in North Carolina, Georgia, and Florida), and in the Midwest (in Indiana and Kentucky). Central Newspapers holdings included newspaper outlets in several Indiana cities and in Arizona. As president of Central Newspapers, Inc., Pulliam's publishing holdings came to include the Franklin (Indiana) Evening Star; the Lebanon Reporter; the Indianapolis Star, which he acquired in 1944; the Muncie Star; the Arizona Republic and its one-time rival the Phoenix Gazette, both of which were purchased in 1946; the Indianapolis News, acquired in 1948; and the Huntington Herald-Press.

=== Other business interests ===
Prior to 1960, Pulliam was head of radio stations WAOV and WIRE in Indiana and KTAR in Arizona. He also served three successive terms as a member of the Associated Press’s board of directors, from 1961 to 1969, as well as a vice president of the organization. In addition, Pulliam was a major stockholder of the New York Central Railroad, becoming a director of the railroad company in 1954.

== Political supporter ==
Pulliam was an active supporter of General Dwight D. Eisenhower's bid for U.S. president and served as a delegate to the 1952 Republican National Convention in Chicago, Illinois, where General Eisenhower was named the Republican Party's presidential nominee. However, Pulliam was less willing to endorse Barry Goldwater's candidacy against President Lyndon Johnson in the 1964 presidential race. Well known as a political conservative, Pulliam also wrote and published a syndicated domestic-affairs column called "Window on the Right" during the 1960s. In addition, Pulliam was an outspoken advocate of freedom of the press.

== Death and legacy ==
Pulliam died after suffering a heart attack at his retirement home in Phoenix, Arizona, on June 23, 1975, at the age of eighty-six. His remains are interred at Oak Hill Cemetery in Lebanon, Indiana.

Over a career that spanned six decades, Pulliam either owned or operated forty-six newspapers in the United States. At the time of his death, Pulliam was publisher of The Arizona Republic, the Phoenix Gazette, and owner of the Indianapolis Star, the Indianapolis News, the Muncie Star, the Muncie Press, and the Vincennes Sun Commercial.

Nina (Mason) Pulliam, his widow, became president of Central Newspapers, retaining the office until 1979. She also served from 1975 to 1978 as the publisher of the Arizona Republic and the Phoenix Gazette. She stepped down as publisher of the two Arizona newspapers in 1978 and retired from Central Newspapers in 1979 at the age of seventy-three. Eugene C. and Nina Mason Pulliam were also among the founders of the Phoenix Zoo.

Pulliam's son, Eugene S. Pulliam, took over as publisher of the Indianapolis Star and the Indianapolis News, the Central Newspapers company's two major newspapers in Indianapolis. In 1975, the Indianapolis Star won a Pulitzer Prize for its series on police corruption, with Eugene C. Pulliam's granddaughter, Myrta Pulliam, as a contributor. In 1991 the Indianapolis Star won another Pulitzer Prize for its investigation of medical malpractice in Indiana.

On August 1, 2000, the Gannett acquired Central Newspapers, Inc., for $2.6 billion. The Eugene C. Pulliam Trust, which owned 78 percent of the company's stock, was the principal beneficiary of the transaction. As a condition of his will, Pulliam had ordered that the trust could not sell the corporation unless it was "seriously threatened" by a "substantially complete loss" of value. In a somewhat controversial move the trustees interpreted this clause loosely and declared that the merger would be the only way to prevent the corporation from suffering a long-term loss of value.

== Honors and awards ==
- Received honorary degrees from Wabash College, Indiana University, Huntington College, Franklin College, Indiana Technical College, Vincennes University, Arizona State University, Baker University, and Norwich University.
- Elected an honorary president of the national Sigma Delta Chi journalism society in 1959; named a Sigma Delta Chi fellow in 1967; awarded the Wells Key, Sigma Delta Chi's highest honor for members, in 1969.
- Named an honorary member of the International Printing Pressmen and Assistants Union of North America in 1965.
- Named a trustee of William Allen White Foundation at the University of Kansas in 1966.
- Inducted into the Indiana Journalism Hall of Fame in 1966.
- Received the John Peter Zenger Award for Press Freedom from the University of Arizona in 1965.
- Received the Golden Plate Award of the American Academy of Achievement in 1968.
- The Eugene C. Pulliam Fellowship for Editorial Writing, a program of the Sigma Delta Chi Foundation, was introduced in 1977 with funding from his widow, Nina Pulliam, to provide an annual cash award (US$75,000 in 2019) to editorial writers and columnists working at a news publication in the United States.
- Inducted into DePauw University's Media Hall of Fame in 1995, along with his son.

== Selected published works ==
- South America, Land of the Future, Jewel of the Past (1951).
- The People and the Press: Partners for Freedom (1965), coauthored with Frederic S. Marquardt
- The Unchanging Responsibility of the American Newspaper in a Changing Society (1970)
