= Phoenix Gazette =

Defunct daily Arizona newspaper

- Type: Afternoon daily newspaper
- Owner(s): Central Newspapers, Inc. (1946–1997)
- Founded: 1881
- Ceased publication: 1997
- Language: English
- Headquarters: Phoenix
- Sister newspapers: The Arizona Republic
- OCLC number: 2251533

The Phoenix Gazette was a newspaper published in Phoenix, Arizona, United States. It was founded in 1881, and was known in its early years as the Phoenix Evening Gazette.

== History ==
In 1889, it was purchased by Samuel F. Webb, who at the time was a member of the 15th Arizona Territorial Legislature, as the Councilor from Maricopa County, the upper house of the legislature.

In 1930 it was purchased by Charles Stauffer and W. Wesley Knorpp, the owner of its one-time rival The Arizona Republic. Both papers were subsequently acquired by Eugene C. Pulliam, in 1946.

Under Pulliam's management, it continued to operate as the main evening paper for the Phoenix area for several decades. During the 1970s and 1980s it was published weekday and Saturday afternoons.

In August 1995, the staffs of the Republic and the Gazette merged, and the Gazette mostly became an afternoon edition of the Republic with a few updates. Eventually the Gazette's circulation declined and it ceased publication in January 1997.
