= Eugene S. Pulliam =

American newspaper publisher (1914–1999)

- Born: Eugene Smith Pulliam; September 7, 1914; Atchison, Kansas, US
- Died: January 20, 1999 (aged 84); Indianapolis, Indiana, US
- Resting place: Crown Hill Cemetery and Arboretum, Section 45, Lot 5; 39.8197581°N 86.1708945°W
- Education: DePauw University
- Occupation: Newspaper publisher
- Spouse: Jane (Bleecker) Pulliam
- Children: Myrta Pulliam, Deborah Pulliam, Russell Pulliam
- Parent(s): Eugene C. Pulliam and Myrta (Smith) Pulliam
- Relatives: Dan Quayle (nephew)
- Awards: Hoosier Press Association's First Freedom Award (1995)

Eugene Smith Pulliam (September 7, 1914 – January 20, 1999) was the publisher of the Indianapolis Star and the Indianapolis News from 1975 until his death. He was also a supporter of First Amendment rights, an advocate of press freedom, and opposed McCarthyism. The Kansas native, DePauw University graduate (class of 1935), and World War II veteran of the U.S. Navy and U.S. Naval Reserve pursued a six-decade-long career in journalism that included work for the United Press new agency, as news director of WIRE-AM in Indianapolis, and in various editorial and publishing positions at the Star and News before he succeeded his father, Eugene C. Pulliam, as publisher of the two newspapers. During Eugene S. Pulliam's tenure as publisher of the Star, it received two Pulitzer Prizes; one in 1975 for a series of articles on police corruption in Indianapolis and Marion County, Indiana, and another in 1991 for investigation of medical malpractice in Indiana. Pulliam also became executive vice president of Central Newspapers, Inc., the media holding company his father founded in 1934. Dan Quayle, Eugene C. Pulliam's grandson and Eugene S. Pulliam's half nephew, served as the 44th Vice President of the United States from 1989 to 1993.

== Early life ==
Pulliam was born on September 7, 1914, in Atchison, Kansas, to Myrta (Smith) and Eugene C. Pulliam. At that time his father was editor and publisher of the Atchison Daily Champion, the first of forty-six newspapers that he eventually owned. In 1915 Eugene C. Pulliam sold the Daily Champion to purchase the Franklin Evening Star and moved the family to Indiana. Myrta Pulliam died in 1917 and Eugene C. Pulliam married Martha Ott (1891–1991) of Franklin, Indiana, in 1919. Eugene C. and Martha (Ott)) Pulliam had two daughters. Eugene S. Pulliam's half-sisters were Martha Corinne Pulliam, who later married James Cline Quayle, and Helen Suzanne Pulliam, who later married William Murphy. In 1923 Eugene C. Pulliam sold the Franklin Evening Star and purchased the Lebanon Reporter. "Young Gene" as he was known began working during his youth delivering the Lebanon Reporter and the Indianapolis News. He also had an apprenticeship at the Reporter.

Pulliam enrolled at DePauw University in Greencastle, Indiana, and earned a bachelor's degree in history in 1935. Pulliam edited the DePauw Daily, an independent student newspaper that his father founded when he was a student at DePauw, and served as president of Sigma Delta Chi, a journalism fraternity his father founded in 1909 with nine other DePauw students. Sigma Delta Chi was later renamed the Society of Professional Journalists. Eugene S. Pulliam was a DePauw University trustee for twenty years.

== Marriage and family ==
Pulliam was married from 1943 until his death in 1999 to Jane (Bleecker) Pulliam (1918–2003). They were the parents of three children. Their two daughters were Myrta Pulliam, director of electronic news and information at Indianapolis Newspapers at the time of her father's death, and Deborah S. Pulliam, a textile artist, freelance writer, and historian. Their son Russell Pulliam was an editor at the Indianapolis News at the time of his father's death. Dan Quayle, the 44th Vice President of the United States from 1989 to 1993, was the son of Pulliam's half-sister, Martha C. (Pulliam) Quayle and her husband, James C. Quayle.

== Career ==
=== Early years ===
After graduating from DePauw University in 1935, Pulliam worked for the United Press news service in Chicago, Illinois; Detroit, Michigan; and Buffalo, New York. Pulliam returned to Indianapolis, Indiana, in 1938 to serve as news director of WIRE-AM, one of the radio stations his father also owned. During World War II Pulliam served in the U.S. Navy and U.S. Naval Reserve. He retired in 1948 as a lieutenant commander. In the meantime, Pulliam's father formed Central Newspapers, Inc., in 1934 as a holding company for his publishing interests. During his father's sixty-three years as a newspaper publisher, he acquired forty-six newspapers across the United States. In addition to the Franklin Evening Star and the Lebanon Reporter, Central Newspapers holdings included, among others, the Indianapolis Star, the Arizona Republic, the Phoenix Gazette, and the Indianapolis News.

=== Newspaper publisher ===
After retiring from the military, Pulliam resumed his journalism and publishing career at the Indianapolis Star, which his father had purchased in 1944, and served as aviation editor, assistant city editor, and city editor at the newspaper. In 1948 he was named managing editor of the Indianapolis News which Central Newspapers acquired the same year. Pulliam became assistant publisher of both newspapers in 1962. He succeeded Eugene C. Pulliam as publisher of the Star and the News following his father's death on June 23, 1975. Budget-conscious Pulliam was known for his close scrutiny of the newspaper's expenses, but refused a recommendation from the company's accountants to charge for obituaries: "People get mentioned in the paper only when they are born and when they die," he once said, "so we're not going to charge them for dying."

During Eugene S. Pulliam's tenure as publisher of the Indianapolis Star, its staff was awarded two Pulitzer Prizes. In 1975 the news staff won the award for local investigative reporting for its series in 1974 on local police corruption and corruption the Marion County, Indiana, prosecutor's office. In 1991 Star reporters Joseph T. Hallinan and Susan M. Headden won the investigative reporting award for their series of reports on medical malpractice in Indiana.

Pulliam also rose through the ranks at Central Newspapers. At the time of his father's death in 1975, Pulliam was executive vice president of Central Newspapers. In 1979 he became president of Phoenix Newspapers, Inc., following the retirement of Nina Mason Pulliam, his stepmother, as publisher of the Arizona Republic and the Phoenix Gazette in 1978 and as president of Central Newspapers in 1979.

=== Political views ===
Pulliam was an advocate of First Amendment rights and press freedom. He was among the journalists who were critical of U.S. Senator Joseph McCarthy's interrogation of James W. Wechler, editor of the New York Post, during closed Senate hearings on April 24 and May 5, 1953. Pulliam served as a member of the American Society of News Editors's eleven-person special committee that reviewed Senator McCarthy's questioning of Wechler. Committee members did not agree that McCarthy's questions interfered with press freedom, but Pulliam, along with J. R. Wiggins, managing editor of the Washington Post, Herbert Brucker, editor of the Hartford Courant, and William M. Tugman, editor of the Register-Guard in Eugene, Oregon, filed a signed report that challenged McCarty's methods, believing his tactics were a threat to First Amendment rights.

Eugene S. Pulliam, or "Young Gene" as he was known "was quiet and calm and did not allow his conservative views to leak into the news columns." However, he did critique the press for its coverage of the 1988 United States presidential election, when Dan Quayle, Pulliam's nephew, was the Republican Party's vice presidential nominee and elected to office. Pulliam chastised the press for what he claimed to have been "unfair and inaccurate reporting" during the campaign.

== Death and legacy ==
Pulliam died in Indianapolis on January 20, 1999, at the age of eighty-four.

== Honors and awards ==
- Inducted into the Indiana Journalism Hall of Fame in 1987.
- Awarded Hoosier Press Association's First Freedom Award in 1995.
- Inducted into DePauw University's Media Hall of Fame in 1995, along with his father.

== Tributes ==
- The Eugene S. Pulliam School of Journalism at Butler University is named in his honor.
- In April 2000, the DePauw University's media building was renamed the Pulliam Center for Contemporary Media following a US$5 million donation to the school from Eugene C. Pulliam's family that also endowed the Eugene S. Pulliam Visiting Professorship in Journalism.
- The annual The Eugene S. Pulliam First Amendment Award from the Sigma Delta Chi Foundation is given in honor of Pulliam's dedication to First Amendment rights and values at the annual Society of Professional Journalists's national convention. The award honors individuals or groups whose efforts have contributed to protecting and preserving First Amendment rights.
- The annual Eugene S. Pulliam National Journalism Writing Award from the Pulliam family sponsors through Ball State University is an award competition with a US$1,000 cash prize.
- The Eugene S. Pulliam Internship Program is offered by the Hoosier State Press Association to undergraduate college students from Indiana or others attending Indiana colleges or universities to participate in paid internships at Indiana newspapers.
