= The Lebanon Reporter =

American newspaper in Indiana, founded 1891

- Type: Daily newspaper
- Format: Broadsheet
- Owner(s): Community Newspaper Holdings Inc.
- Publisher: Beverly Joyce
- Founded: 1891 (134 years ago)
- Headquarters: 117 East Washington Street, Lebanon, Indiana 46052 United States
- Circulation: 5,326 daily
- Website: reporter.net

The Lebanon Reporter is a daily newspaper serving Lebanon, Indiana, and adjacent portions of Boone County, Indiana.

== History ==
It was founded in 1891. It is owned by Community Newspaper Holdings Inc.

In May 2021, The Zionsville Times-Sentinel merged with The Lebanon Reporter.

The paper's marketing slogan is "Something for Everyone."
