= US Senate career of Dan Quayle =

Dan Quayle
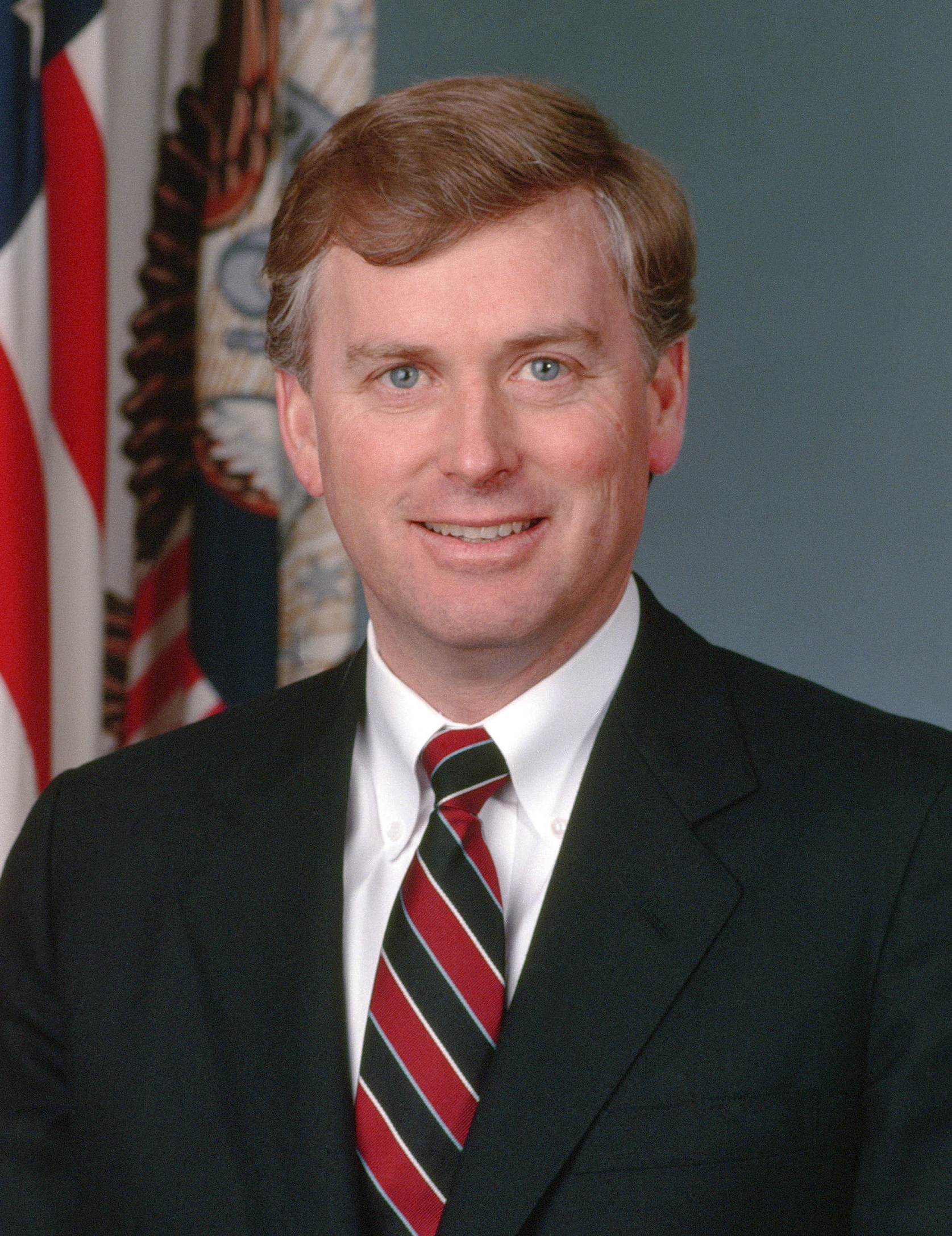
- Official vice presidential portrait, c. 1989

President of the United States Senate
- In office January 20, 1989 – January 20, 1993
- President pro tem: Robert Bryd
- Preceded by: George H. W. Bush
- Succeeded by: Al Gore

United States Senator from Indiana
- In office January 3, 1981 – January 3, 1989
- Preceded by: Birch Bayh
- Succeeded by: Dan Coats

Dan Quayle served as a United States Senator from Indiana from the years 1981 to 1989. A member of the Republican Party, Quayle served in the United States House of Representatives from 1977 until 1981. Quayle resigned his Senate seat after being elected Vice President of the United States. Upon his inauguration he became President of the United States Senate serving from 1989 to 1993.

Representative Quayle did not seek a third term in the United States House of Representatives and instead ran in the 1980 United States Senate election in Indiana challenging incumbent Senator, Birch Bayh. Quayle won in a close race and assumed office at the age of 33 years old. Quayle was one of the youngest senators elected in the United States and the youngest elected from the state of Indiana. Quayle would then run for re-election in the 1986 United States Senate election in Indiana and would win in a landslide against democratic nominee, Jill Long Thompson. During his tenure he co-authored the Job Training Partnership Act of 1982. Quayle also served as Chair of the Senate Committee System Study Committee. Quayle served during the Carter Administration for a brief amount of time (Note: The Carter Administration ended on January 20, 1981, meaning Quayle served for 17 days of the administration.) and for mostly the entirety of the Reagan Administration from the years 1981 until 1989. (Note: Quayle resigned his seat on January 3, 17 days before the Reagan administration ended.)

In the 1988 United States presidential election after George H. W. Bush selected Dan Quayle to be his running mate. Quayle was little known but was popular within the Republican party. The pair won the election in a landslide defeating Michael Dukakis and Lloyd Bentsen and Quayle resigned his senate seat on January 3 and was succeeded by fellow hoosier, Dan Coats. Upon Quayle's swearing in as Vice President of the United States, he became President of the United States Senate serving from 1989 until 1993. During his tenure as President of the Senate Quayle cast zero tie breaking votes. (Note: The only other vice presidents with this distinction include John Tyler, William R. King, Andrew Johnson, Thomas A. Hendricks, Theodore Roosevelt, Charles W. Fairbanks, Calvin Coolidge, Lyndon B. Johnson, Gerald Ford, Nelson Rockefeller and Joe Biden.) Bush and Quayle ran for re-election in the 1992 United States presidential election and lost to Bill Clinton and Al Gore. As President of the Senate, Quayle presided over the Electoral college vote count and verified his and Bush's loss. On January 20, 1993, Al Gore took over as President of the United States Senate.

Quayle was involved with the United States Senate for a total of 12 years, serving for 8 years as a senator and 4 years as President of the United States Senate. Quayle was well respected during his time within the Senate. During his time in Congress, Quayle served in the 95th (1977–1979) to the 100th (1987–1989) Congresses and during his time as President of the Senate he served in the 101st (1989–1991), the 102nd (1991–1993) and he served for 17 days in the 103rd (1993) Congress.

== Elections ==

=== 1980 ===
In 1978, Darrel Christian, writing for the Associated Press, believed that Quayle would use a 1978 House victory to "springboard" a future run for one of Indiana's Senate seats. After two terms in the House of Representatives, Quayle decided to challenge three-term incumbent Democratic senator Birch Bayh. Quayle stated that he decided to run because he felt that Bayh's liberal views did not reflect the political positions of Indianans and that they led to poor economic results. He blamed liberal politicians, including Bayh, Ted Kennedy, and George McGovern, for supporting policies that led to high inflation rates. Prior to the election, Quayle began traveling across Indiana, visiting all 92 counties in the state to help generate support for his primary bid. In the primary election, he faced Roger Marsh. Marsh was a harsh critic of Quayle, leading to backlash from within the Indiana Republican Party. Due to this, Quayle was considered the favorite to receive the nomination. Quayle defeated Marsh in a landslide in the primary election.

Quayle's competitor from the Democratic party was Incumbent Senator Birch Bayh who was running for a fourth term in the Senate. Senator Bayh was a very popular within the state of Indiana. He was Chairman of Senate Intelligence Committee and architect of 25th and 26th Amendments. This election was one of the key races in the country, and signaled a trend that would come to be known as Reagan's coattails, describing the influence Ronald Reagan had in congressional elections. Bayh was expected to win the election in a landslide although throughout the weeks the election tightened even more and by election day it was a dead heated race. The race was very close but Quayle came out victorious and won by over 160,000 votes, Quayle received 53.79% of the vote to Bayh's 46.21%.

=== 1986 ===
Senator Quayle ran for re-election to the Senate. Quayle was unopposed in the Republican primary. His democratic opponent was Jill Long Thompson. Quayle was very popular in the senate and had many supporters. From the beginning, Quayle was expected to win the race. Jill Long Thompson struggled to get funding for her campaign. Incumbent Senator Dan Quayle ended up winning the race in a landslide and got 60.57% of the vote to his opponents, 38.51% of the vote. This was the last election in which Quayle ran for the United States Senate as he resigned after winning the 1988 United States presidential election and became Vice President of the United States.

== Committee assignments ==
- United States Committee on Labor and Human Resources
- United States Committee on Armed Services
- United States Committee on Budget
- United States House Committee on Appropriations

== United States Senator from Indiana (1981–1989) ==
=== Tenure ===
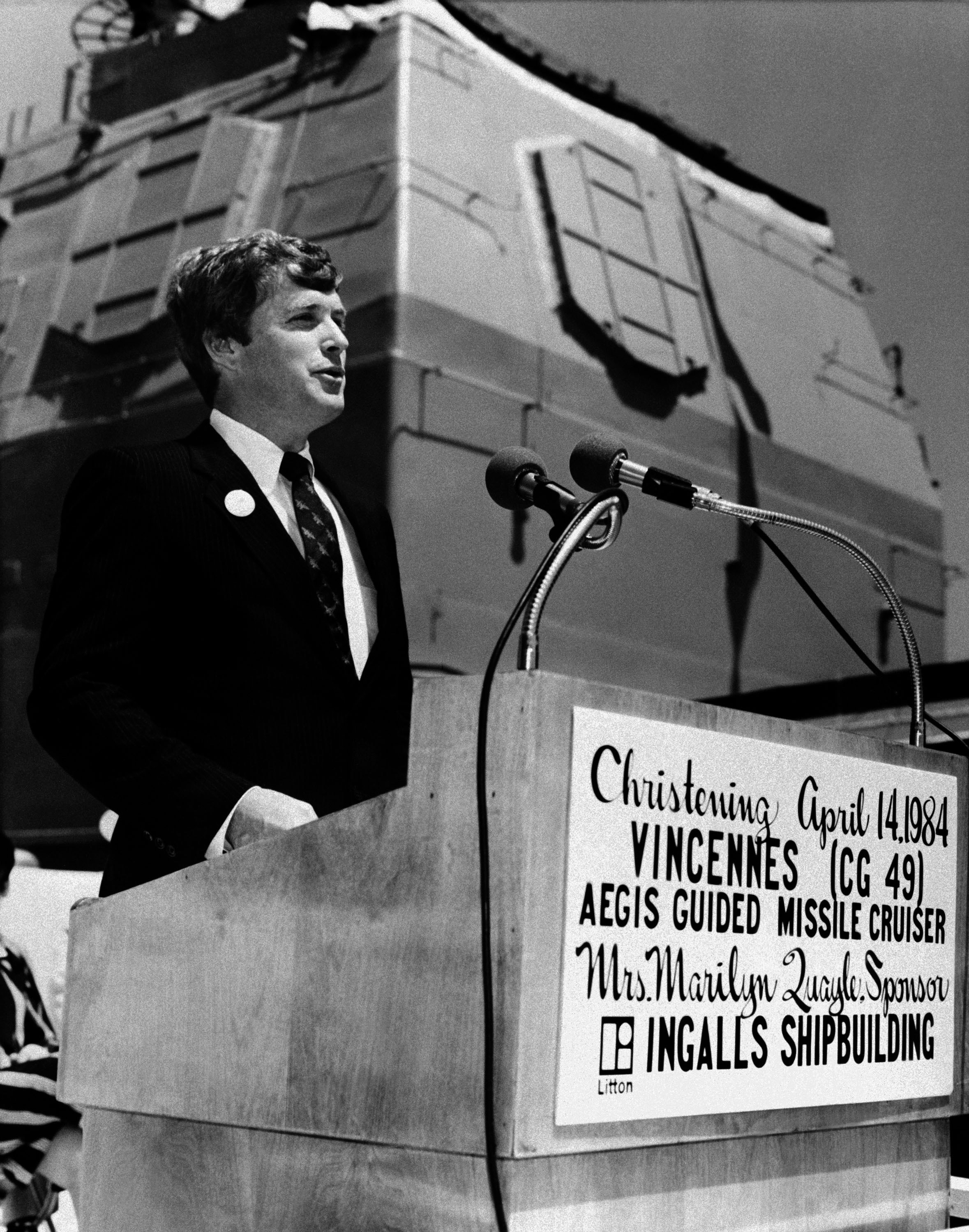
Quayle at Pascagoula, 1984

During Quayle's tenure in the United States Senate, he served on the Labor and Human Resources Committee, the Budget Committee, the Armed Services Committee and the United States House Committee on Appropriations. Quayle worked with Senator Ted Kennedy to pass a job training bill, with unemployment being a major concern for Quayle. After a relatively easy reelection campaign in 1986, Quayle quietly positioned himself as a potential vice presidential candidate in the 1988 United States presidential election. Quayle sponsored a total of 30 bills while in the Senate. He was the sole sponsor of 18 bills. Three bills went into law, and the other 27 failed to pass through Congress. Bills that became laws:

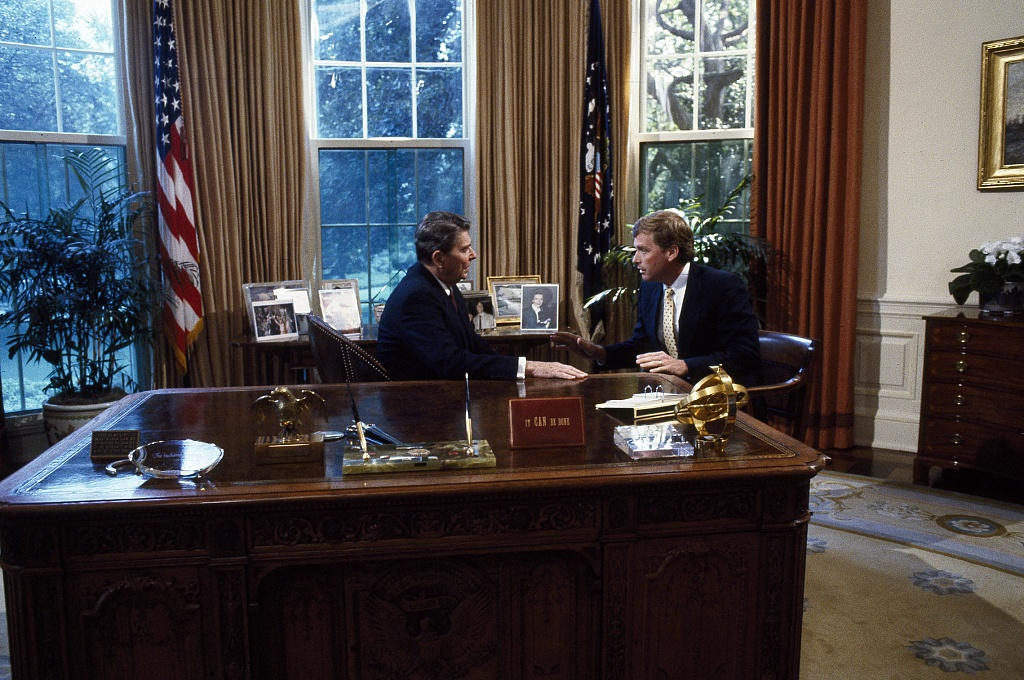
Ronald Reagan and Dan Quayle (1986)

- S. 2036 (97th Congress) – Job Training Partnership Act (JTPA) of 1982: Quayle's signature legislative achievement, co-authored with Senator Ted Kennedy, which overhauled federal job training programs and established Private Industry Councils.
- S. 2742 (98th Congress) – Education for Economic Security Act Amendments of 1984: A bill that revised and extended federal financial assistance programs for improving math, science, and foreign language education.
- S. 2068 (99th Congress) – Job Training Partnership Act Amendments of 1986: A legislative package introduced to streamline and improve the performance standards of his original 1982 job training act.

== Resignation and replacement in the Senate ==
Republican nominee, George H. W. Bush selected Senator Dan Quayle to be his running mate in the 1988 United States presidential election. Quayle accepted and became less involved within the senate during the campaign. Their competitors were Michael Dukakis and Lloyd Bentsen. During a debate between Bentsen and Quayle, Quayle repeatedly compared himself to former President John F. Kennedy. Bentsen, a friend of Kennedy, denied the comparison, saying, "Senator, I served with Jack Kennedy. I knew Jack Kennedy. Jack Kennedy was a friend of mine. Senator, you're no Jack Kennedy". On November 8, 1988, the Bush-Quayle ticket defeated the Dukakis-Bentsen ticket by over seven million votes, winning 40 states. Quayle was elected the 44th Vice President of the United States.

Due to his and then-Vice President George H.W. Bush's victory in the 1988 presidential election, Quayle resigned from the Senate. Republican Representative Dan Coats of Indiana's 4th congressional district was appointed to fill the vacancy. Coats ran for reelection in the 1990 special election in Indiana winning the remainder of Quayle's term.

== President of the United States Senate (1989–1993) ==
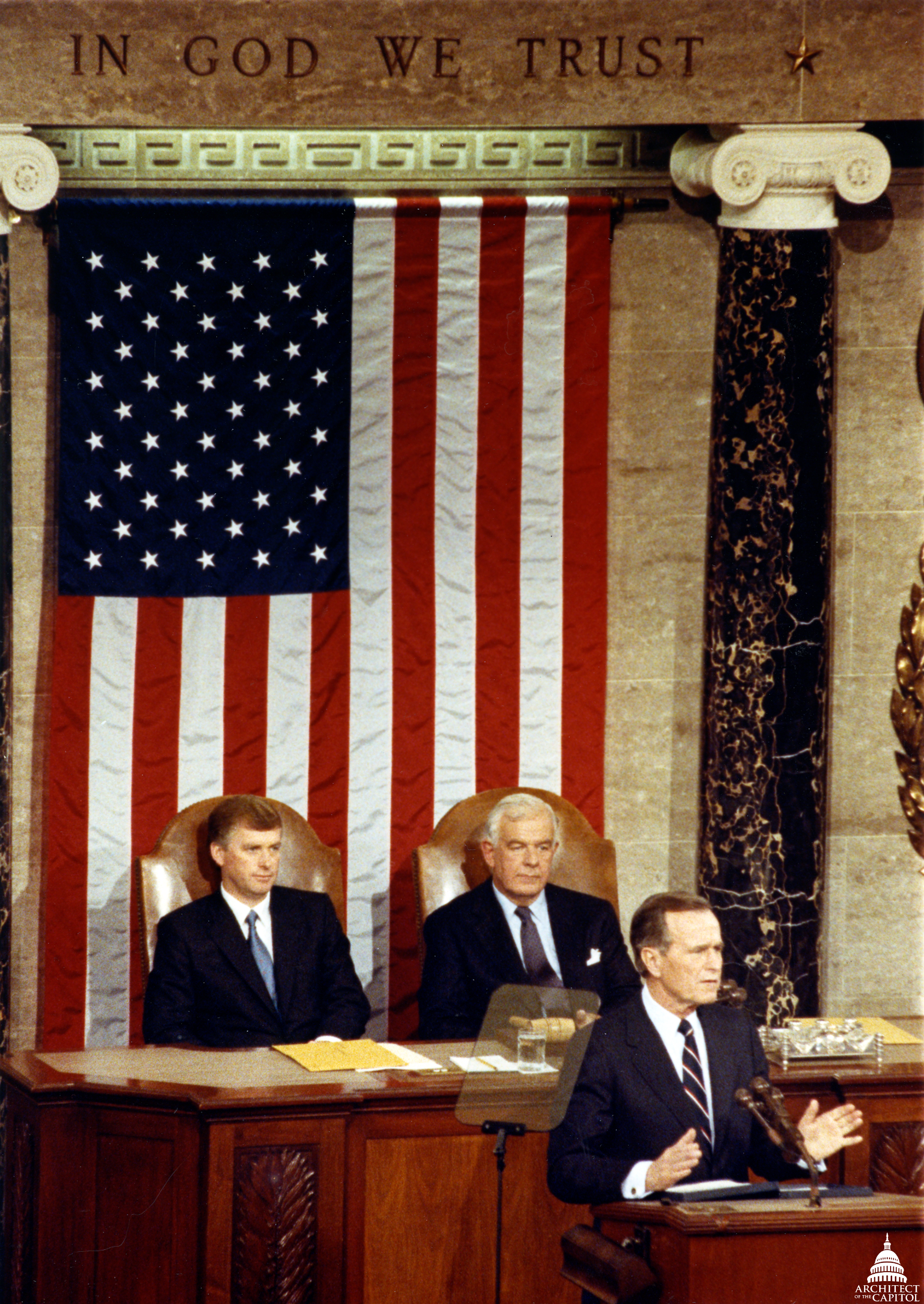
1990 State of the Union

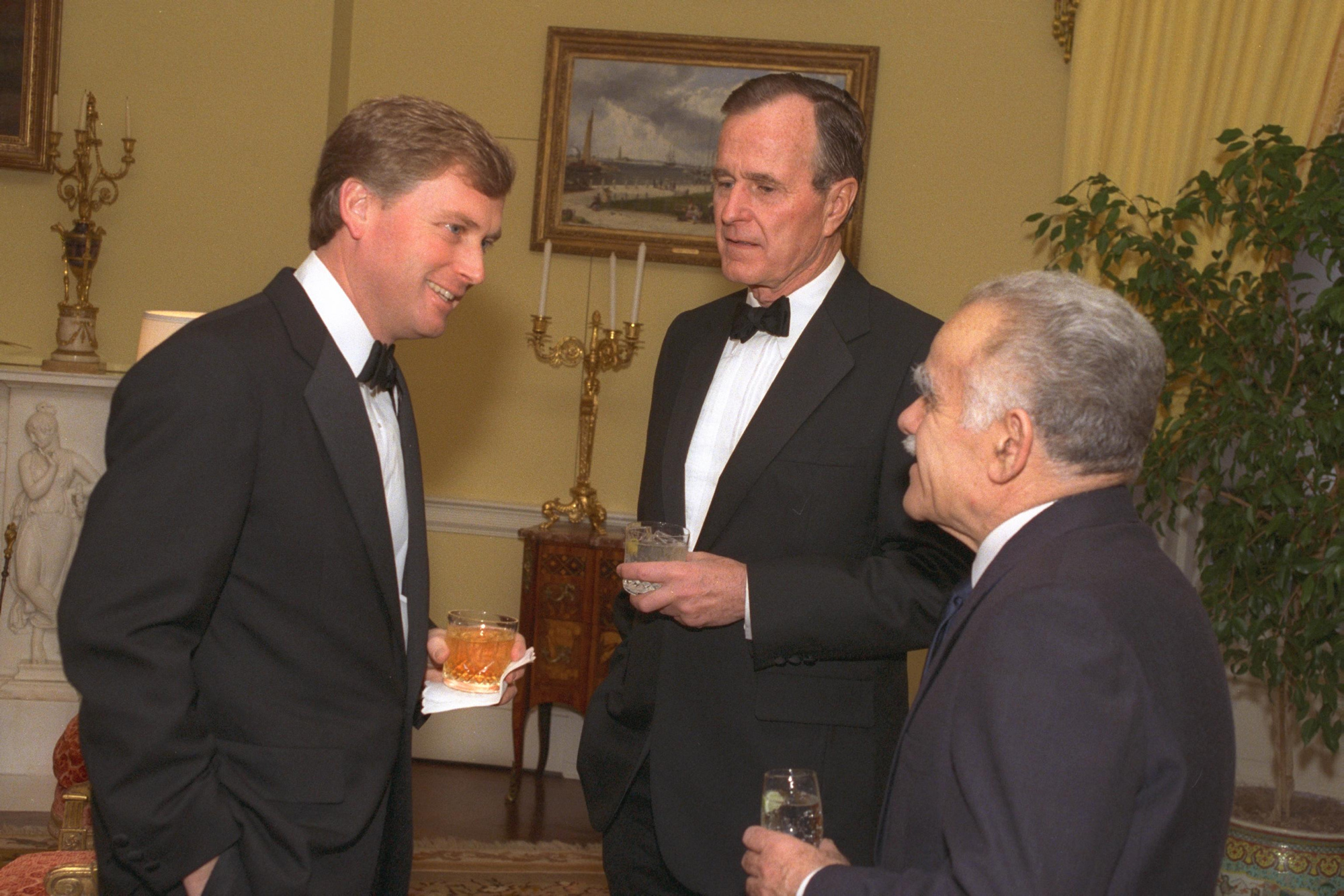
President George H. W. Bush and Quayle

=== Tenure ===
During Quayle's tenure as President of the Senate he cast zero tie breaking votes. Quayle was present for the 1989 State of the Union Address, the 1990 State of the Union Address, the 1991 State of the Union Address and the 1992 State of the Union Address.

==== 1992 U.S. Presidential Election ====
Quayle and Bush were challenged by Democrats Arkansas governor Bill Clinton and Tennessee senator Al Gore. Additionally, independent businessman Ross Perot ran a third party campaign. On election day, Clinton and Gore defeated both the Bush-Quayle and Perot tickets. This would bring the end to Quayle's time in the Senate and the end of him being President of the United States Senate.

==== Electoral ballot count, 1993 ====
After losing the 1992 United States presidential election Quayle finished his duties such as swearing in new senators for the next Congress. One of his duties was the Electoral ballot count to confirm the winners of the election, Bill Clinton and Al Gore. This took place on January 6 of 1993, 17 days before the First inauguration of Bill Clinton and Al Gore.

== Legacy throughout the U.S. Senate ==
On September 19, 2000, Dan Quayle came back to the Senate and gave a speech.

== See also ==
- Vice presidency of Dan Quayle
- Electoral history of Dan Quayle
- List of tie-breaking votes cast by the vice president of the United States
- US Senate career of Barack Obama
- US Senate career of Joe Biden
- US Senate career of Kamala Harris
- US Senate career of JD Vance
- US Senate career of Hillary Clinton
