= Electoral history of Dan Quayle =

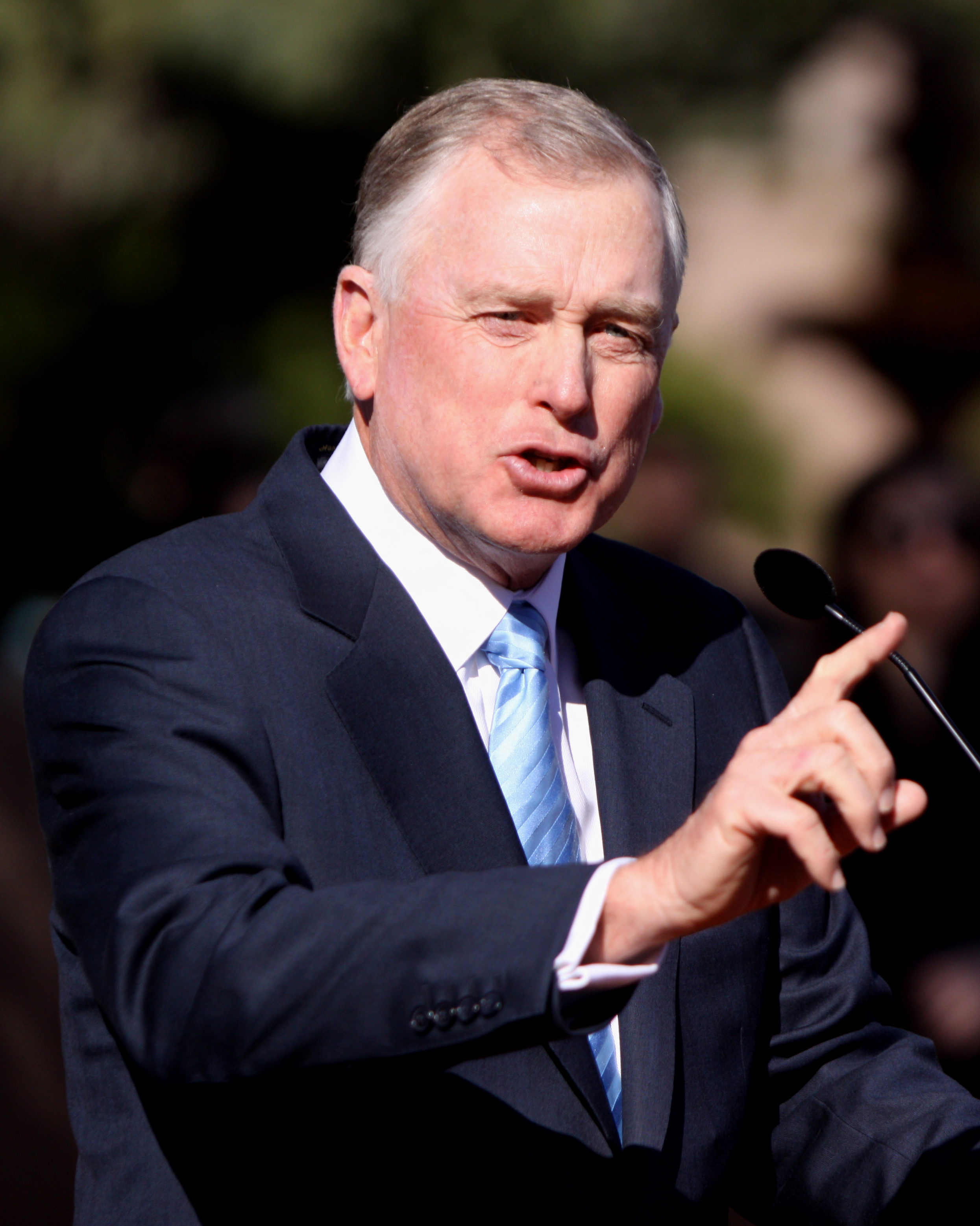
Quayle speaking at a campaign for 2012 Republican presidential nominee Mitt Romney.

Dan Quayle, the 44th vice president of the United States (1989–1993), has run for public office several times, beginning in 1976. He is a member of the Republican Party, one of two major parties in the United States. Quayle represented Indiana's 4th congressional district in the United States House of Representatives from 1977 to 1981 and served as a United States senator from Indiana from 1981 to 1989.

Quayle began his political career in 1976 by unseating incumbent Democratic representative J. Edward Roush. He won a second term against John D. Walda. After serving two terms in the House, Quayle upset three-term incumbent Democratic senator Birch Bayh as part of a Republican landslide. In 1986, he won a second term in a landslide victory against Jill Long.

In 1988, Quayle was chosen by Vice President George H. W. Bush to serve as his running mate in the 1988 presidential election. Quayle and Bush won the election, defeating Democrats Massachusetts governor Michael Dukakis and Texas senator Lloyd Bentsen, taking office on January 20, 1989. He and Bush ran for reelection but were defeated in the 1992 presidential election by Arkansas governor Bill Clinton and Tennessee senator Al Gore. Quayle considered a presidential bid in 1996 before unsuccessfully seeking the Republican nomination in 2000.

== United States House of Representatives (1976–1978) ==
=== 1976 ===
In 1976, Quayle, then a general manager of the Huntington Herald-Press, decided to challenge the incumbent representative for Indiana's 4th congressional district, Democrat J. Edward Roush. Quayle stated that part of his decision to run was because he felt there was a need for congressional reform, labeling Roush's long career as part of the problem. Quayle was challenged for the nomination by Dennis L. Wright. Throughout the primary, due to Wright struggling to raise funding for his campaign, Quayle was seen as the forerunner. Quayle defeated Wright by a margin of 2,558 votes. Wright later switched parties and sought the Democratic nomination the following election.

Republican primary results
Party	Candidate	Votes	%
Republican	Dan Quayle	3,473	79.15%
Republican	Dennis L. Wright	915	20.85%
Total votes		4,388	100.00

Due to Roush's popularity, Quayle was expected to lose the general election. Despite this, Quayle defeated Roush by a margin of 19,401 votes, around ten percent of the vote. Quayle credited his victory to his connections with newspapers and well-placed advertisements. He was the sole challenger in Indiana to unseat an incumbent representative.

1976 United States House of Representatives elections in Indiana's 4th congressional district
Party	Candidate	Votes	%
Republican	Dan Quayle	107,762	54.4
Democratic	J. Edward Roush (Incumbent)	88,361	44.6
American	Gail E. Crain	2,060	1.0
Total votes		198,183	100.00
Republican gain from Democratic			

=== 1978 ===
In 1978, Quayle ran for reelection, winning the Republican nomination unopposed. In the general election, he was challenged by Democrat John D. Walda. If he won a second term, Quayle planned to run for Senate in 1980. The South Bend Tribune criticized Walda's campaign as being directionless and unclear on his views. Quayle told the South Bend Tribune that his aides advised against participating in debates with Walda. However, he went against their advice and debated Walda anyways; he explained that he believed it was important to be open. On election day, Quayle received almost twice as many votes as Walda and won a second term.

1978 United States House of Representatives elections in Indiana's 4th congressional district
Party	Candidate	Votes	%
Republican	Dan Quayle (incumbent)	80,527	64.4
Democratic	John D. Walda	42,238	33.8
American	Terry Eugene Hively	2,352	1.9
Total votes		125,117	100.00
Republican hold			

== United States Senate (1980–1986) ==
=== 1980 ===
In 1978, Darrel Christian, writing for the Associated Press, believed that Quayle would use a 1978 House victory to "springboard" a future run for one of Indiana's Senate seats. After two terms in the House of Representatives, Quayle decided to challenge three-term incumbent Democratic senator Birch Bayh. Quayle stated that he decided to run because he felt that Bayh's liberal views did not reflect the political positions of Indianans and that they led to poor economic results. He blamed liberal politicians, including Bayh, Ted Kennedy, and George McGovern, for supporting policies that led to high inflation rates. Prior to the election, Quayle began traveling across Indiana, visiting all 92 counties in the state to help generate support for his primary bid. In the primary election, he faced Roger Marsh. Marsh was a harsh critic of Quayle, leading to backlash from within the Indiana Republican Party. Due to this, Quayle was considered the favorite to receive the nomination. Quayle defeated Marsh in a landslide.

Republican primary results
Party	Candidate	Votes	%
Republican	Dan Quayle	397,273	77.06%
Republican	Roger Marsh	118,273	22.94%
Total votes		515,546	100.00

1980 U.S. Senate map

On November 4, 1980, while Bayh was expected to win reelection, Quayle won in an upset victory by a margin of 166,452 votes. Quayle's win was a part of the Republican landslide in both Indiana and the nation as a whole, with Republicans winning every statewide seat in Indiana.

1980 United States Senate election in Indiana
Party	Candidate	Votes	%
Republican	Dan Quayle	1,182,414	53.8
Democratic	Birch Bayh (Incumbent)	1,015,962	46.2
Total votes		2,198,376	100.00
Republican gain from Democratic			

=== 1986 ===
1986 U.S. Senate map

In 1986, Quayle sought reelection, facing Democratic challenger Jill Long. Pundits believed Quayle would easily win reelection. Additionally, Long struggled to fund her campaign, raising just over $100,000 to Quayle's $2,200,000. A debate between the pair was held on September 7, 1986. On election day, Quayle was re-elected in a landslide. Due to his and Vice President George H.W. Bush's victory in the 1988 presidential election, Quayle resigned from the Senate. Republican representative Dan Coats of Indiana's 4th congressional district was appointed to fill the vacancy. Coats ran for reelection in the 1990 special election in Indiana, winning the remainder of Quayle's term.

1986 United States Senate election in Indiana
Party	Candidate	Votes	%
Republican	Dan Quayle (Incumbent)	936,143	60.6
Democratic	Jill Long	595,192	38.5
Libertarian	Bradford L. Warren	8,314	0.5
American	Rockland R. Snyder	5,914	0.4
Total votes		1,545,563	100.00
Republican hold			

== Presidential elections (1988–2000) ==
=== 1988 ===
==== Nomination ====
After Vice President George H. W. Bush won the 1988 Republican Party presidential primaries, he selected Quayle as his running mate. The selection of Quayle surprised many of Bush's closest advisers, who had expected Bush to pick a more well-known running mate. However, Bush adviser Roger Ailes helped convince Bush that Quayle would be able to effectively attack the Democratic presidential nominee, Massachusetts governor Michael Dukakis. Bush eventually chose Quayle due to his youth and experience in domestic policy. Additionally, Bush felt the need to "balance the ticket" geographically, and he thought that selecting Quayle, a midwesterner, would help him do so. During a 2016 interview with Indianapolis Monthly, Quayle explained that he believed he was selected due to his age and his role in writing the Job Training Partnership Act of 1982.

==== General election ====
Electoral College map of the 1988 presidential election

In the general election, Quayle and Bush ran against Democrats Dukakis and Texas senator Lloyd Bentsen. During a debate between Bentsen and Quayle, Quayle repeatedly compared himself to former president John F. Kennedy. Bentsen, a friend of Kennedy, denied the comparison, saying, "Senator, I served with Jack Kennedy. I knew Jack Kennedy. Jack Kennedy was a friend of mine. Senator, you're no Jack Kennedy". On November 8, 1988, the Bush-Quayle ticket defeated the Dukakis-Bentsen ticket by over seven million votes, winning 40 states. Quayle was elected the 44th vice president of the United States.

1988 United States presidential election
Candidate	Running mate	Party	Popular vote		Electoral vote	
Candidate	Running mate	Party	Votes	%	Votes	%
George H. W. Bush	Dan Quayle	Republican	48,886,588	53.37	426	79.33
Michael Dukakis	Lloyd Bentsen	Democratic	41,809,485	45.65	111	20.67
Ron Paul	Andre Marrou	Libertarian	431,750	0.47	0	0.00
Lenora Fulani	Joyce Dattner	New Alliance	217,221	0.24	0	0.00
David Duke	Floyd Parker	People's	47,004	0.05	0	0.00
Eugene McCarthy	Florence M. Rice	Citizens	30,905	0.03	0	0.00
Others			171,733	0.19	0	0.00
Total			91,594,686	100.00	537	100.00

Note: A faithless elector from West Virginia voted for Bentsen for president and Dukakis for vice president.

=== 1992 ===
==== Nomination ====
Throughout Bush's presidency, there existed widespread speculation about Bush potentially replacing Quayle as his running mate in his expected 1992 reelection. The choice of running mate was considered to be particularly important given Bush's age and widely reported health issues. As early as 1989, Quayle's poor public standing was noted by The Washington Post, which conducted a poll that found voters did not consider him fit to take over the presidency by a 52 to 38 percent margin. In 1990, The New York Times reported that there was a movement from Republican voters to have Quayle dropped from the ticket in 1992.

Bush did not want to drop Quayle, as he felt doing so would admit that choosing Quayle in 1988 had been a mistake. Bush's children George and Jeb recommended replacing Quayle with Secretary of Defense Dick Cheney. Former presidents Richard Nixon and Gerald Ford also urged Quayle's removal from the Republican ticket. Ultimately, on August 19, 1992, Quayle and Bush were renominated at the 1992 Republican National Convention. Bush received 2,166 delegates, and Quayle was nominated through a voice vote.

==== General election ====
Electoral College map of the 1992 presidential election

Quayle and Bush were challenged by Democrats Arkansas governor Bill Clinton and Tennessee senator Al Gore. Additionally, independent businessman Ross Perot ran a third party campaign. On election day, Clinton and Gore defeated both the Bush-Quayle and Perot tickets.

1992 United States presidential election
Candidate	Running mate	Party	Popular vote		Electoral vote	
Candidate	Running mate	Party	Votes	%	Votes	%
Bill Clinton	Al Gore	Democratic	44,909,806	43.02	370	68.77
George H. W. Bush	Dan Quayle	Republican	39,104,550	37.46	168	31.23
Ross Perot	James Stockdale	Independent politician	19,743,821	18.91	0	0.00
Andre Marrou	Nancy Lord	Libertarian	290,087	0.28	0	0.00
Bo Gritz	Cyril Minett	Populist	104,014	0.10	0	0.00
Lenora Fulani	Maria Muñoz	New Alliance	73,952	0.07	0	0.00
Others			171,733	0.16	0	0.00
Total			104,397,963	100.00	538	100.00

=== 2000 Republican primary ===
In late 1994, Quayle considered running for president in the 1996 presidential election, establishing an exploratory committee and forming a political action committee. Quayle held several rallies and was set to formally announce his campaign in April 1995. However, on February 9, 1995, despite being popular among conservatives, Quayle decided against running, citing low campaign donation numbers. The decision against a presidential bid was seen as a surprise by many pundits, with various Republicans speculating that the choice was made following health concerns regarding a benign tumor and blood clots that were found in his lungs. The following year, several of his political allies attempted to get Quayle to run in the 1996 Indiana gubernatorial election; however, he opted against it, as he believed that being out of office would help him in a future presidential bid. Quayle later told journalist David S. Broder that he regretted not running.

In the years leading up to the 2000 presidential election, news sources began to speculate that Quayle would again attempt a run for the presidency. On February 3, 1999, Quayle announced his bid for presidency and began his campaign. On April 8, Reuters reported that Quayle's campaign had raised over $2 million, placing him behind Texas governor George W. Bush and Arizona senator John McCain, who had raised $7 million and $4 million, respectively, but ahead of activist Gary Bauer, who had raised about $1.4 million. Despite a weak performance in the 1999 Iowa straw poll, Quayle promised to stay in the race until the New Hampshire primary and Iowa caucus. However, some of his aides told The Washington Post that both Quayle and his wife Marilyn felt that even if he won in New Hampshire, he could not clinch the nomination in the remaining primaries. Quayle exited the race in September 1999. He later endorsed Bush, who defeated Gore in the general election.
