= Vice presidency of Dan Quayle =

U.S. vice presidential tenure from 1989 to 1993

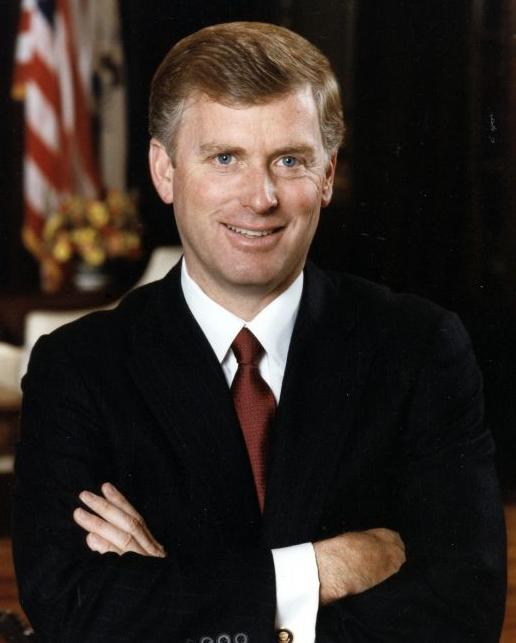
- Official portrait, 1989
- Vice presidency of Dan Quayle; January 20, 1989 – January 20, 1993
- President: George H. W. Bush
- Cabinet: See list
- Party: Republican
- Election: 1988
- Seat: Number One Observatory Circle
- Seal of the Vice President

Dan Quayle was the 44th vice president of the United States during the presidency of George H. W. Bush, from January 20, 1989, to January 20, 1993. Quayle, a member of the Republican Party who previously served as the junior U.S. senator representing Indiana from 1981 to 1989, was selected as incumbent vice president Bush's running mate and took office following their victory in the 1988 presidential election over Democratic nominees Michael Dukakis and Lloyd Bentsen.

Quayle was the first Baby Boomer elected to the vice presidency or presidency. Quayle's tenure was defined by a series of gaffes, most famously writing potato as "potatoe" during a spelling bee. Bush and Quayle lost the 1992 presidential election to Bill Clinton and Al Gore. As vice president in his capacity as the president of the Senate, Quayle oversaw the certification of Clinton and Gore as the winners of the election on January 6, 1993. Bush and Quayle were later succeeded in office by Clinton and Gore on January 20.

In April 1999, Quayle launched a 2000 presidential bid but withdrew by September. He endorsed Bush's son, George W. Bush in 2000. Quayle played a central role in advising his fellow Hoosier and Vice President Mike Pence to certify the 2020 United States presidential election as per the Senate rules, rather than cooperate with a plan by then-president Donald Trump that sought to overturn the election.

== 1988 vice presidential campaign ==
On August 16, 1988, at the Republican convention in New Orleans, Louisiana, George H. W. Bush chose Quayle to be his running mate in the 1988 United States presidential election. The choice immediately became controversial. Outgoing President Reagan praised Quayle for his "energy and enthusiasm". Press coverage of the convention was dominated by questions about "the three Quayle problems". The questions involved his military service, a golf holiday in Florida where he and several other politicians shared a house with lobbyist Paula Parkinson, and whether he had enough experience to be vice president. Quayle seemed at times rattled and at other times uncertain or evasive as he responded to questions. Delegates to the convention generally blamed television and newspapers for the focus on Quayle's problems, but Bush's staff said they thought Quayle had mishandled the questions about his military record, leaving questions dangling. Although Bush was trailing by up to 15 points in public opinion polls taken before the convention, in August the Bush–Quayle ticket took the lead, which it did not relinquish for the rest of the campaign.

In the October 1988 vice-presidential debate, Quayle debated Democratic candidate Lloyd Bentsen. During the debate, Quayle's strategy was to criticize Dukakis as too liberal. When the debate turned to Quayle's relatively limited experience in public life, he compared the length of his congressional service (12 years) with that of President John F. Kennedy (14 years); Kennedy had less experience than his rivals during the 1960 presidential nomination. It was a factual comparison, although Quayle's advisers cautioned beforehand that it could be used against him. Bentsen's response—"I served with Jack Kennedy. I knew Jack Kennedy. Jack Kennedy was a friend of mine. Senator, you're no Jack Kennedy"—subsequently became a part of the political lexicon.

The Bush–Quayle ticket won the November election by a 53–46 percent margin, sweeping 40 states and capturing 426 electoral votes. He was sworn in on January 20, 1989 by justice Sandra Day O'Connor, making him the first vice president to be sworn in by a female justice of the Supreme Court. Quayle cast no tie-breaking votes as president of the Senate, becoming only the second vice-president to serve a complete term without breaking a tie. (Note: Charles W. Fairbanks (1905-1909) was the first and Joe Biden (2009-2017) was the third.)

=== Indiana National Guard controversy ===
Since the 1988 United States elections, Quayle has been the subject of controversy regarding his service in the Indiana National Guard from 1969 to 1975. Many of Quayle's political opponents, media outlets, and Vietnam veterans have speculated that Quayle joined the Indiana National Guard as a means to avoid the draft or to avoid being deployed to Vietnam. In August 1988, Quayle denied the accusations. Quayle's draft controversy received renewed attention during the 1992 United States elections after Democratic nominee Bill Clinton was accused of similar draft dodging measures. In September 1992, Quayle acknowledged that joining the Indiana National Guard cut his risks of being deployed to Vietnam, although he defended his decision. In a 1992 interview with NBC's Meet the Press, Quayle was pressed on whether his main motivation was to avoid being sent to fight in Vietnam. Quayle stated that he had preferences for joining the reserves, and that he never asked for preferential treatment. Quayle also noted that had his unit been called, he would have deployed, stating:

Of course you had much less chance to go to Vietnam, but my unit could have been called up to go to Vietnam. And had it been called up, I would have gone.

In a resurfaced 1989 interview with David Hoffman, filmmaker and Vietnam veteran Oliver Stone commented on Quayle and made contrasts between him and then-Nebraska governor Bob Kerrey, noting:

I'm hopeful of people like Bob Kerrey, for example, [the] governor of Nebraska, would be a presidential candidate. He's about forty-two and lost a leg in Vietnam. [He's a] very bright man, compassionate, he's been there. I think he'd make a fine president. Against him would be a guy like Dan Quayle, who is also about the same age, early forties—a heartbeat away from the presidency—a man who has never really suffered pain—a man who went to the National Guard to avoid Vietnam, and yet he's one who always calls for military intervention in Central America, with other people's bodies. You have that hypocrisy at work.

== Vice presidency (1989–1993) ==
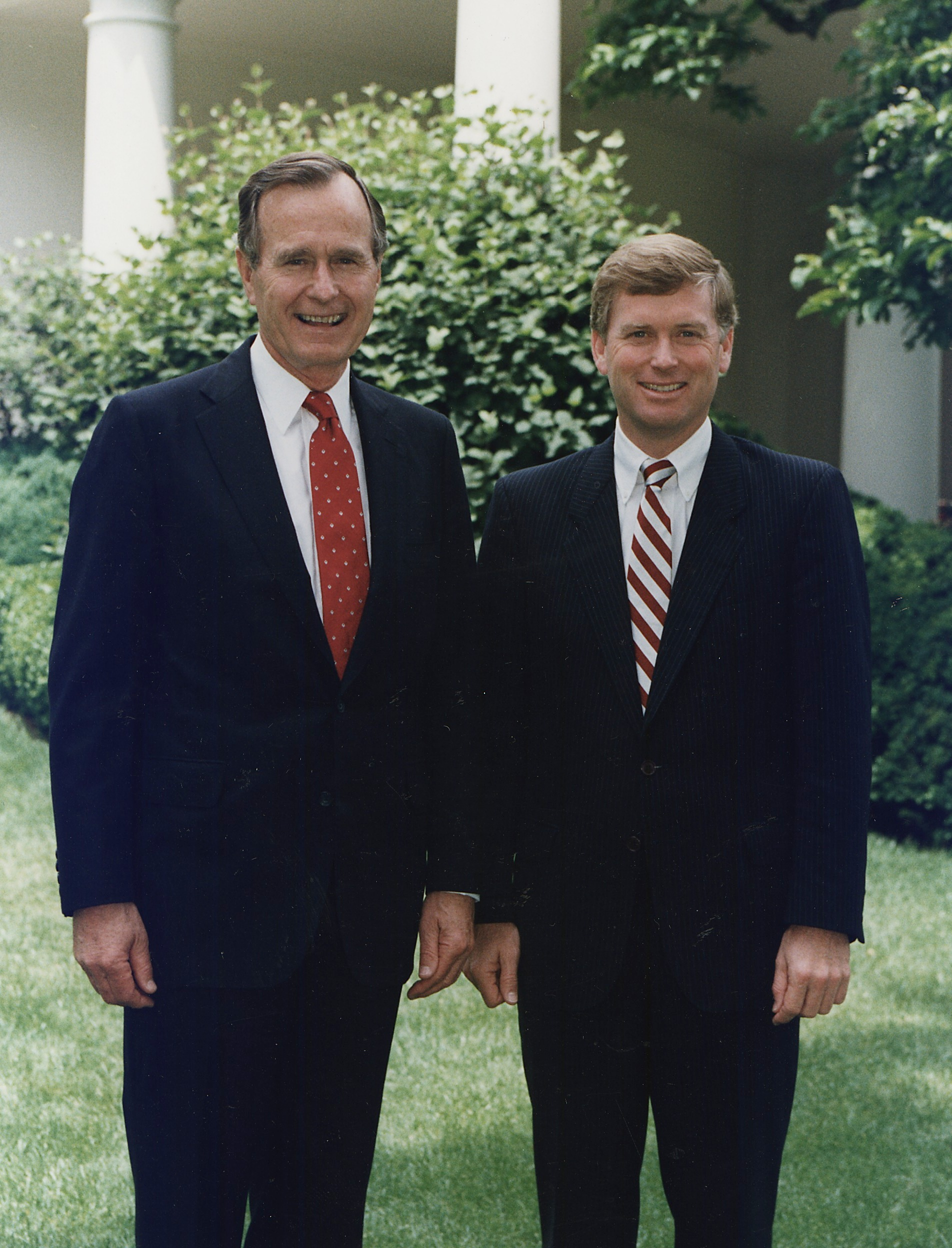
Quayle with President George H. W. Bush in 1989

During his vice presidency, Quayle made official trips to 47 countries. Bush named Quayle head of the Council on Competitiveness and the first chairman of the National Space Council. As head of the NSC he called for greater efforts to protect Earth against the danger of potential asteroid impacts.

After a briefing by Lt. General Daniel O. Graham, (USA Ret.), Max Hunter, and Jerry Pournelle, Quayle sponsored the development of an experimental Single Stage to Orbit X-Program, which resulted in the building of the McDonnell Douglas DC-X. Quayle has since described the vice presidency as "an awkward office. You're president of the Senate. You're not even officially part of the executive branch—you're part of the legislative branch. You're paid by the Senate, not by the executive branch. And it's the president's agenda. It's not your agenda. You're going to disagree from time to time, but you salute and carry out the orders the best you can".

=== Murphy Brown ===
On May 19, 1992, Quayle gave a speech titled Reflections on Urban America to the Commonwealth Club of California on the subject of the Los Angeles riots. In the speech he blamed the violence on a decay of moral values and family structure in American society. In an aside, he cited the single mother title character in the television program Murphy Brown as an example of how popular culture contributes to this "poverty of values", saying, "It doesn't help matters when prime-time TV has Murphy Brown—a character who supposedly epitomizes today's intelligent, highly paid, professional woman—mocking the importance of fathers, by bearing a child alone, and calling it just another 'lifestyle choice'."

The "Murphy Brown speech" became one of the most memorable of the 1992 campaign. Long after the outcry had ended, the comment continued to have an effect on U.S. politics. Stephanie Coontz, a professor of family history and the author of several books and essays about the history of marriage, said that this brief remark by Quayle about Murphy Brown "kicked off more than a decade of outcries against the 'collapse of the family'". In 2002, Candice Bergen, the actress who played Brown, said "I never have really said much about the whole episode, which was endless, but his speech was a perfectly intelligent speech about fathers not being dispensable and nobody agreed with that more than I did." Others interpreted it differently; singer Tanya Tucker was widely quoted as saying "Who the hell is Dan Quayle to come after single mothers?"

=== Gaffes ===
Quayle speaking at Race for the Cure in Washington, D.C. in 1990

Throughout his time as vice president, Quayle was characterized by some media outlets and journalists as being unprepared for the position. Given his position, his comments were heavily scrutinized for factual and grammatical errors. Contributing to this perception of Quayle was his tendency to make public statements that were either incoherent ("I have made good judgments in the past. I have made good judgments in the future"), self-contradictory ("I believe we are on an irreversible trend toward more freedom and democracy, but that could change"), self-contradictory and confused ("The Holocaust was an obscene period in our nation's history. ... No, not our nation's, but in World War II. I mean, we all lived in this century. I didn't live in this century, but in this century's history"), or just confused (such as the comments he made in a May 1989 address to the United Negro College Fund (UNCF). Commenting on the UNCF's slogan—which is "a mind is a terrible thing to waste"—Quayle said, "You take the UNCF model that what a waste it is to lose one's mind or not to have a mind is being very wasteful. How true that is").

On June 15, 1992, Quayle altered 12-year-old student William Figueroa's correct spelling of "potato" to "potatoe" at the Muñoz Rivera Elementary School spelling bee in Trenton, New Jersey. He was the subject of widespread ridicule for his error. According to The New York Times and Quayle's memoirs, he was relying on cards provided by the school, which Quayle says included the misspelling. Quayle said he was uncomfortable with the version he gave, but did so because he decided to trust the school's incorrect written materials instead of his own judgment.

== 1992 vice presidential election ==
In the 1992 election, Bush and Quayle were challenged in their bid for reelection by the Democratic ticket of Arkansas Governor Bill Clinton and Tennessee Senator Al Gore and the independent ticket of Texas businessman Ross Perot and retired Vice Admiral James Stockdale.

As Bush lagged in the polls in the weeks preceding the August 1992 Republican National Convention, some Republican strategists (led by Secretary of State James Baker) viewed Quayle as a liability to the ticket and pushed for his replacement. Quayle ultimately survived the challenge and secured renomination.

During the 1992 presidential campaign, Quayle told the news media that he believed homosexuality was a choice, and "the wrong choice".

Quayle faced off against Gore and Stockdale in the vice presidential debate on October 13, 1992. He attempted to avoid the one-sided outcome of his debate with Bentsen four years earlier by staying on the offensive. Quayle criticized Gore's book Earth in the Balance with specific page references, though his claims were subsequently criticized by the liberal group FAIR for inaccuracy. In Quayle's closing argument, he sharply asked voters, "Do you really believe Bill Clinton will tell the truth?" and "Do you trust Bill Clinton to be your president?" Gore and Stockdale talked more about the policies and philosophies they espoused. Republican loyalists were largely relieved and pleased with Quayle's performance, and his camp attempted to portray it as an upset triumph against a veteran debater, but post-debate polls were mixed on whether Gore or Quayle had won. It ultimately proved to be a minor factor in the election, which Bush and Quayle lost, 168 electoral votes to 370.

== Elections during the Quayle vice presidency ==
Congressional party leaders
		Senate leaders		House leaders	
Congress	Year	Majority	Minority	Speaker	Minority
101st	1989	Mitchell	Dole	Wright	Michel
101st	1989–1990	Mitchell	Dole	Foley (Note: Jim Wright resigned as Speaker of the House on June 6, 1989. Tom Foley was elected to replace Wright as Speaker of the House on June 6, 1989.)	Michel
102nd	1991–1992	Mitchell	Dole	Foley	Michel
103rd (Note: 17 days of the 101st Congress (January 3, 1989 – January 19, 1989) took place under Vice President Bush, and 17 days of the 103rd Congress (January 3, 1993 – January 19, 1993) took place during Quayle's vice presidency.)	1993	Mitchell	Dole	Foley	Michel

Republican seats in Congress
Congress	Senate	House
101st	45	175
102nd	44	167
103rd	43	176

== 2000 presidential campaign ==
Logo from Quayle's 2000 presidential campaign

During a January 1999 appearance on Larry King Live, Quayle said he would run for president in 2000. On January 28, 1999, he officially created an exploratory committee. On April 14, 1999, at a rally held at his alma mater Huntington North High School's gymnasium, Quayle officially launched his campaign for the 2000 Republican presidential nomination. In July 1999, he published his book Worth Fighting For.

During campaign appearances, Quayle criticized fellow candidate George W. Bush. Early on, he criticized Bush's use of the term "compassionate conservative".

Quayle finished eighth in the August 1999 Ames Straw Poll. He withdrew from the race the next month and supported Bush.

== Legacy ==
Dan Quayle played a central role in advising his fellow Hoosier and Vice President Mike Pence to certify the 2020 United States presidential election as per the Senate rules, rather than cooperate with a plan by then-president Donald Trump that sought to overturn the election. Quayle attended President Joe Biden's inauguration on January 20, 2021.

== See also ==
- Presidency of George H. W. Bush
- US Senate career of Dan Quayle
- Electoral history of Dan Quayle
