= 1988 Republican Party vice presidential candidate selection =

1988 Republican vice presidential nomination
- August 16, 1988
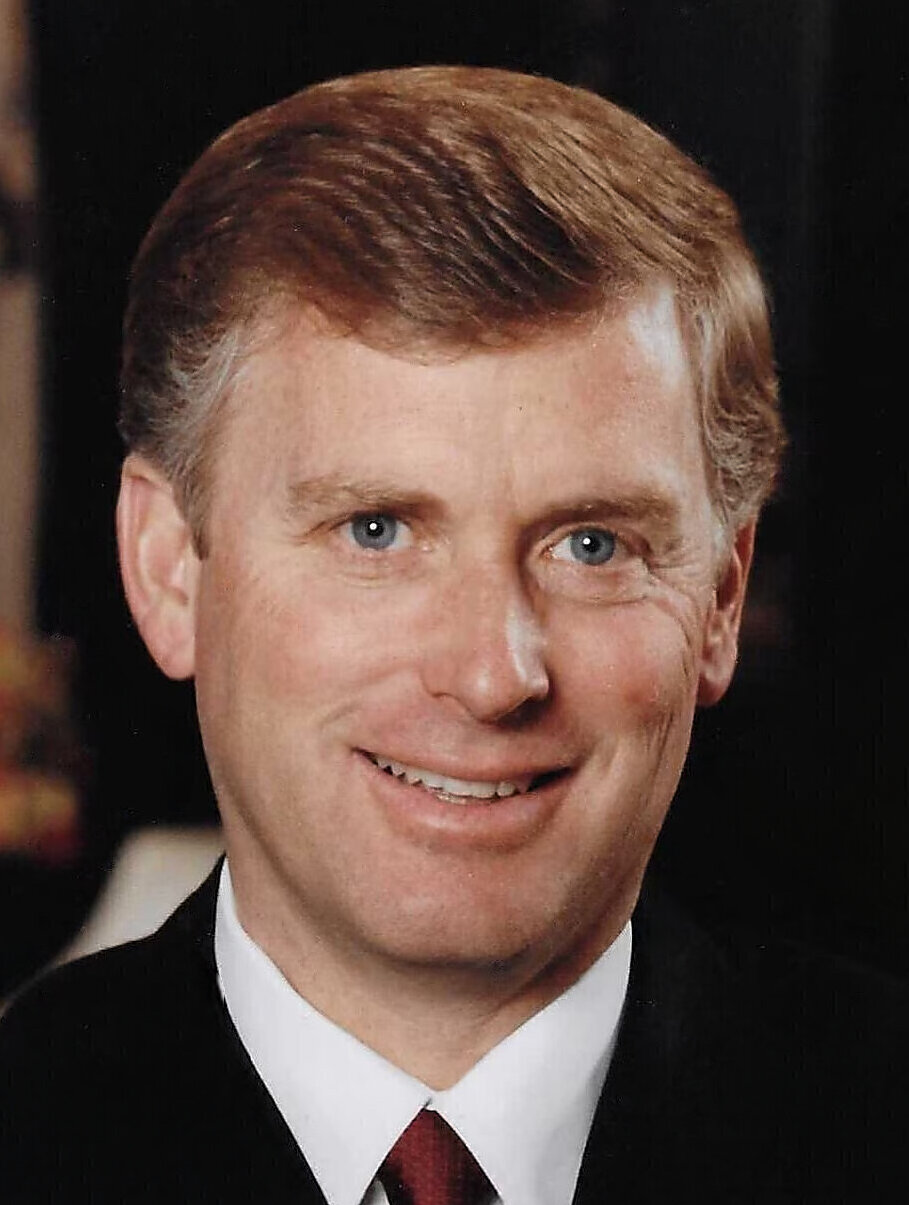
Nominee	Dan Quayle
Home state	Indiana
Previous Vice presidential nominee
George H. W. Bush
Vice presidential nominee
Dan Quayle

Incumbent vice president George H. W. Bush, the 1988 Republican nominee for president of the United States, selected Indiana senator Dan Quayle as his running mate for vice president of the United States on August 16, 1988. The selection of Quayle surprised many of Bush's closest advisers, who had expected Bush to pick a more well-known running mate. Quayle was the first baby boomer generation on a presidential ticket, as well as to be elected to the vice presidency. However, Bush adviser Roger Ailes helped convince Bush that Quayle would be able to effectively attack the Democratic presidential nominee, Michael Dukakis. Bush also liked Quayle's youth and felt that Quayle would make for a loyal vice president. The Bush–Quayle ticket would go on to defeat the Dukakis–Bentsen ticket in the general election but ultimately lost to the Clinton–Gore ticket in 1992.

During the selection process, New York City real-estate developer and future president Donald Trump approached Bush's campaign manager Lee Atwater asking to be considered as a possible choice for running mate. Bush found the request "strange and unbelievable." Contradicting this report, Trump later asserted it was Atwater who approached him asking if he was interested in the position.

== Possible running mates ==
=== Final candidates ===
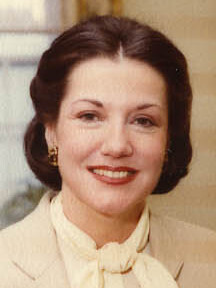
Former Secretary of Transportation
Elizabeth Dole
from Kansas
(1983–1987)

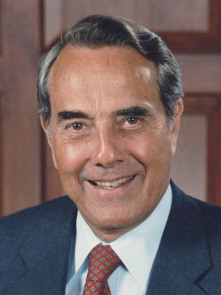
Senator and Senate Minority Leader, and 1976 vice president nominee
Bob Dole
from Kansas
(1969–1996)

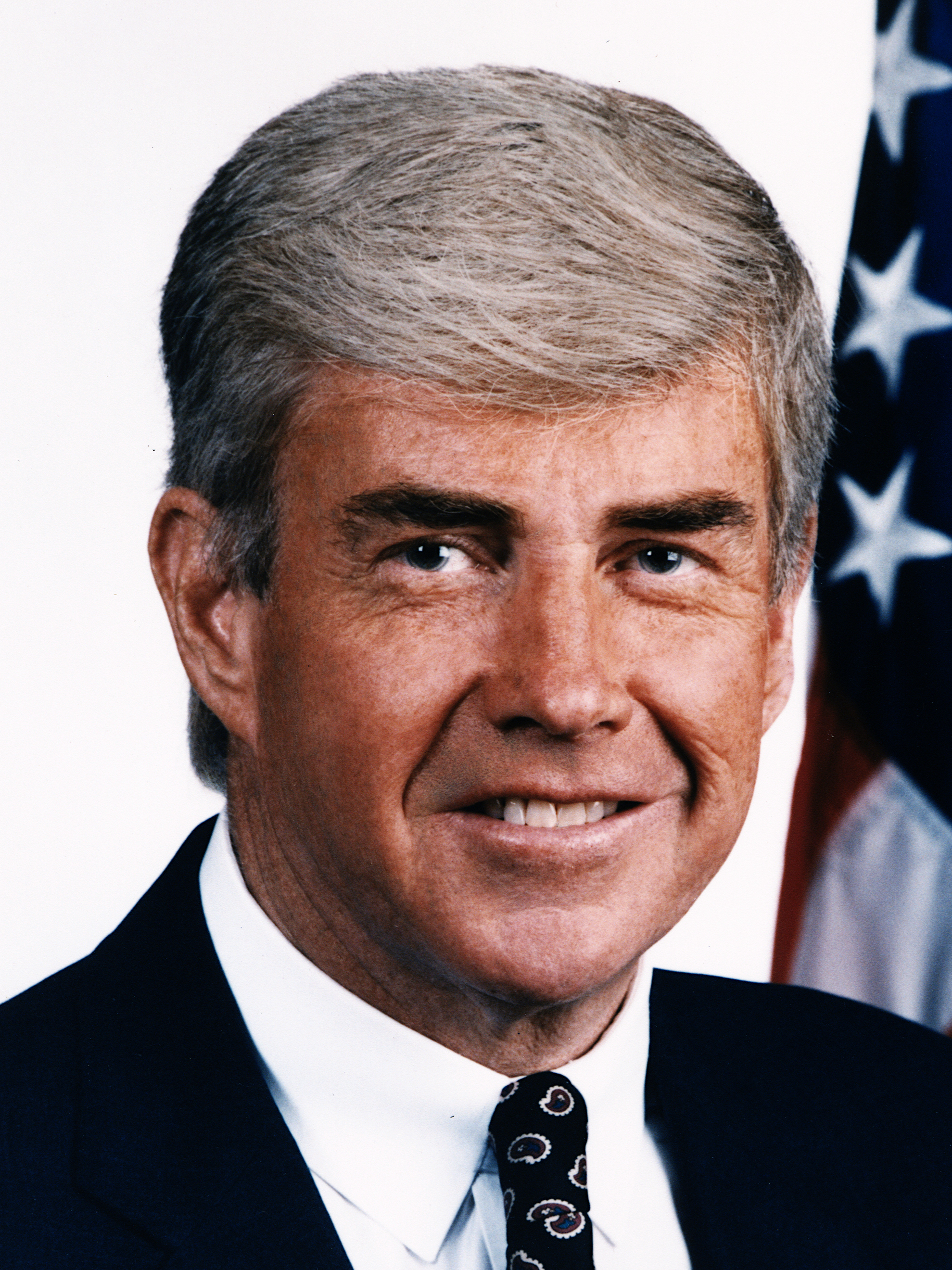
Representative
Jack Kemp
from New York
(1971–1989) (Note: Would be later chosen to become the 1996 Republican vice president nominee.)

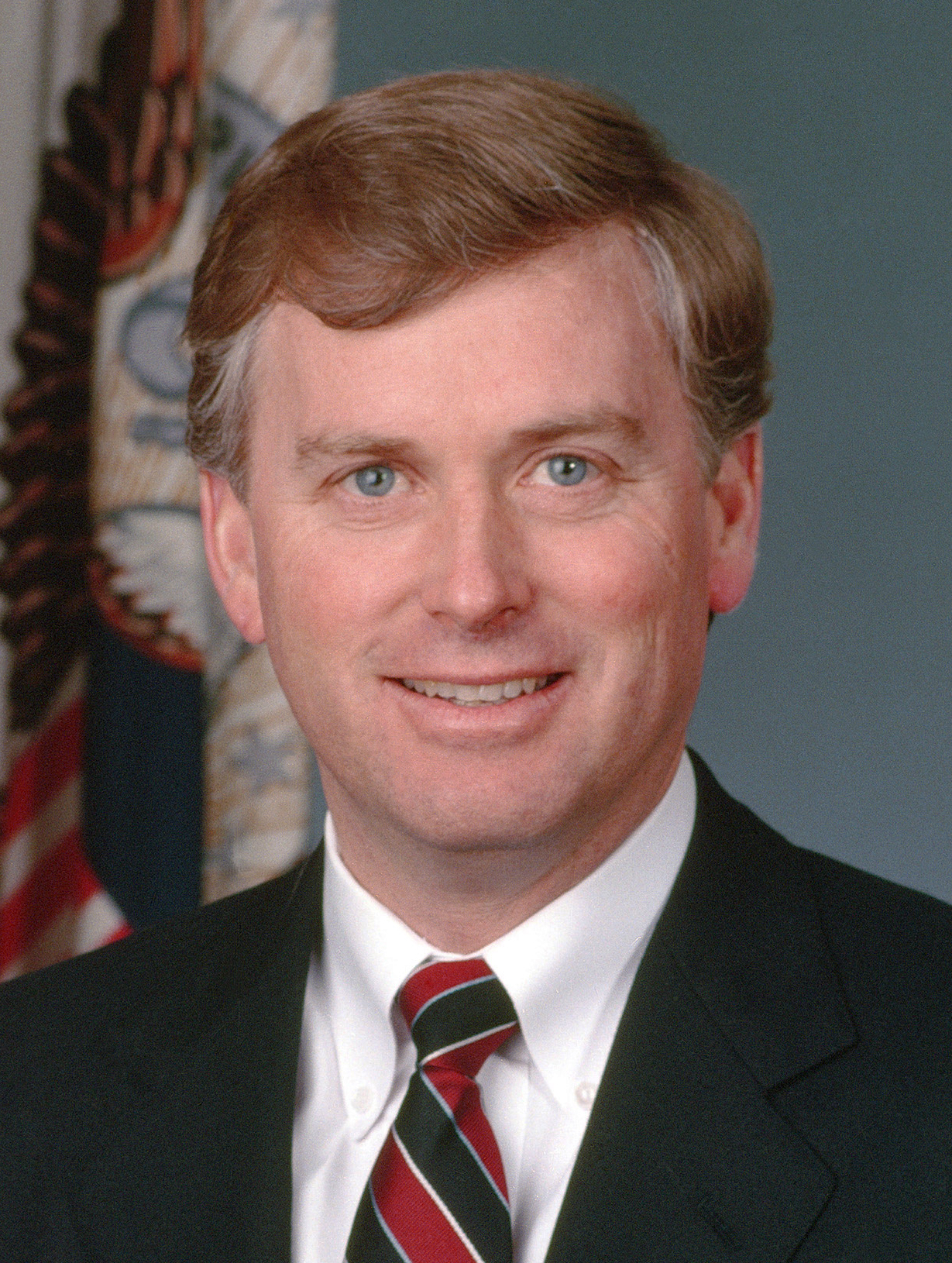
Senator
Dan Quayle
from Indiana
(1981–1989)

== Media speculation on possible running-mates ==
=== Members of Congress ===
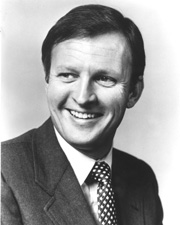
Senator
William L. Armstrong
from Colorado
(1979–1991)

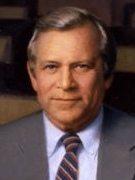
Former Senator
Howard Baker
from Tennessee
(1967–1985)

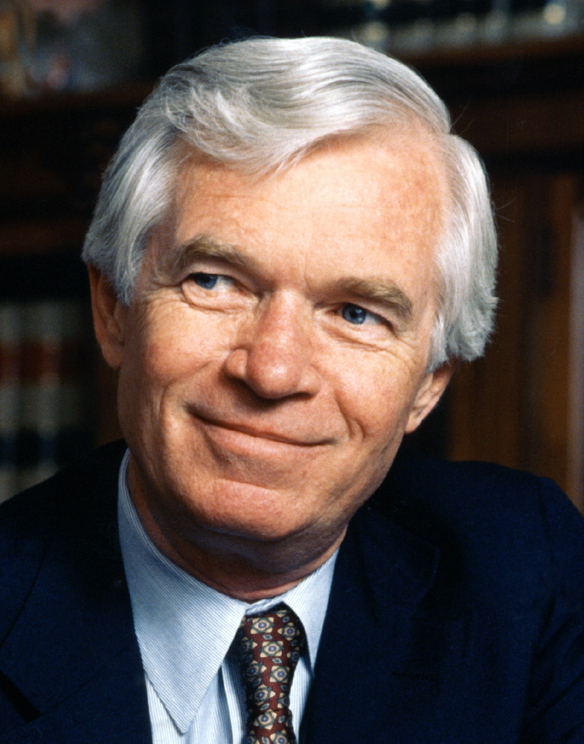
Senator
Thad Cochran
from Mississippi
(1978–2018)

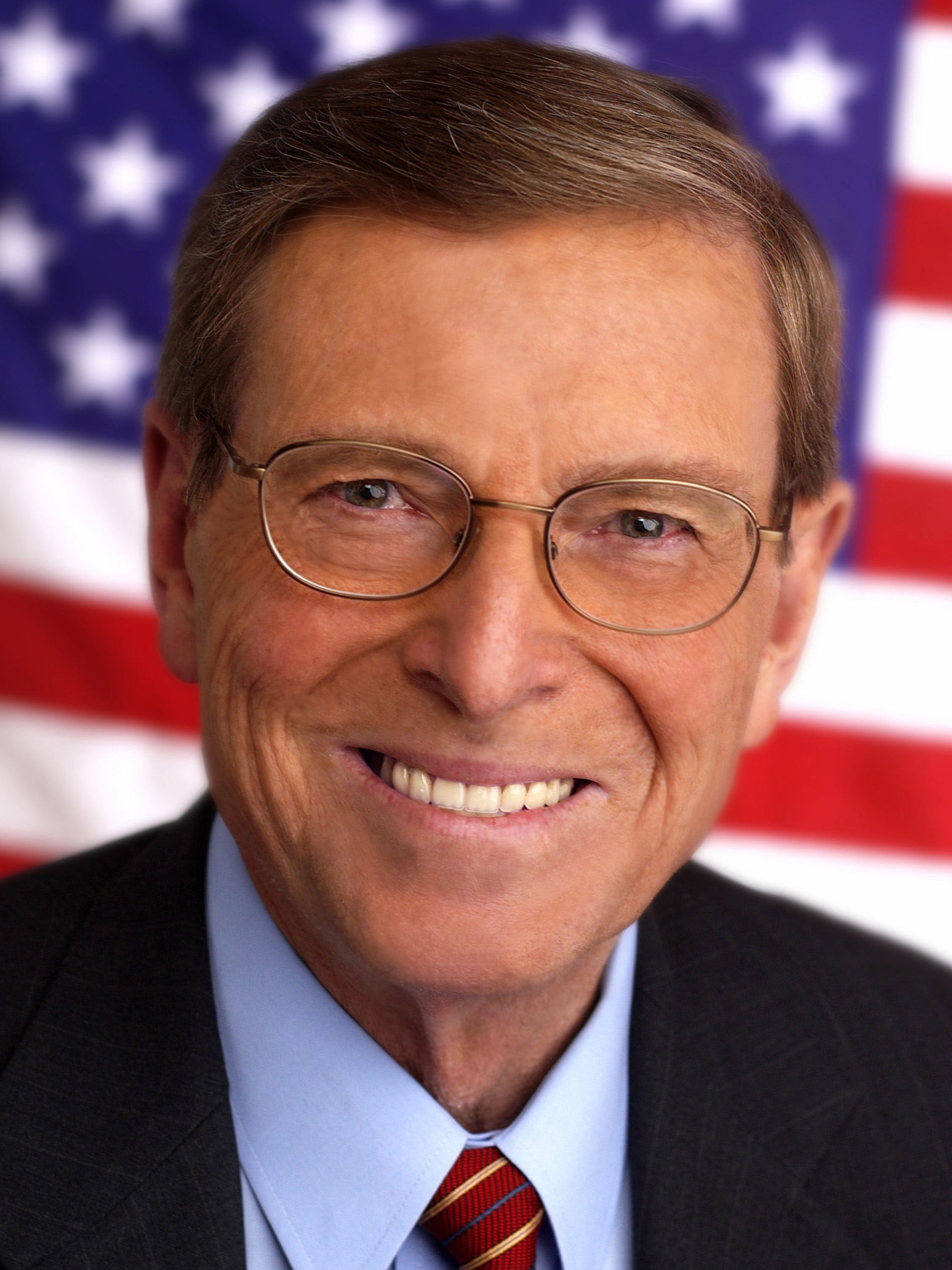
Senator
Pete Domenici
from New Mexico
(1973–2009)

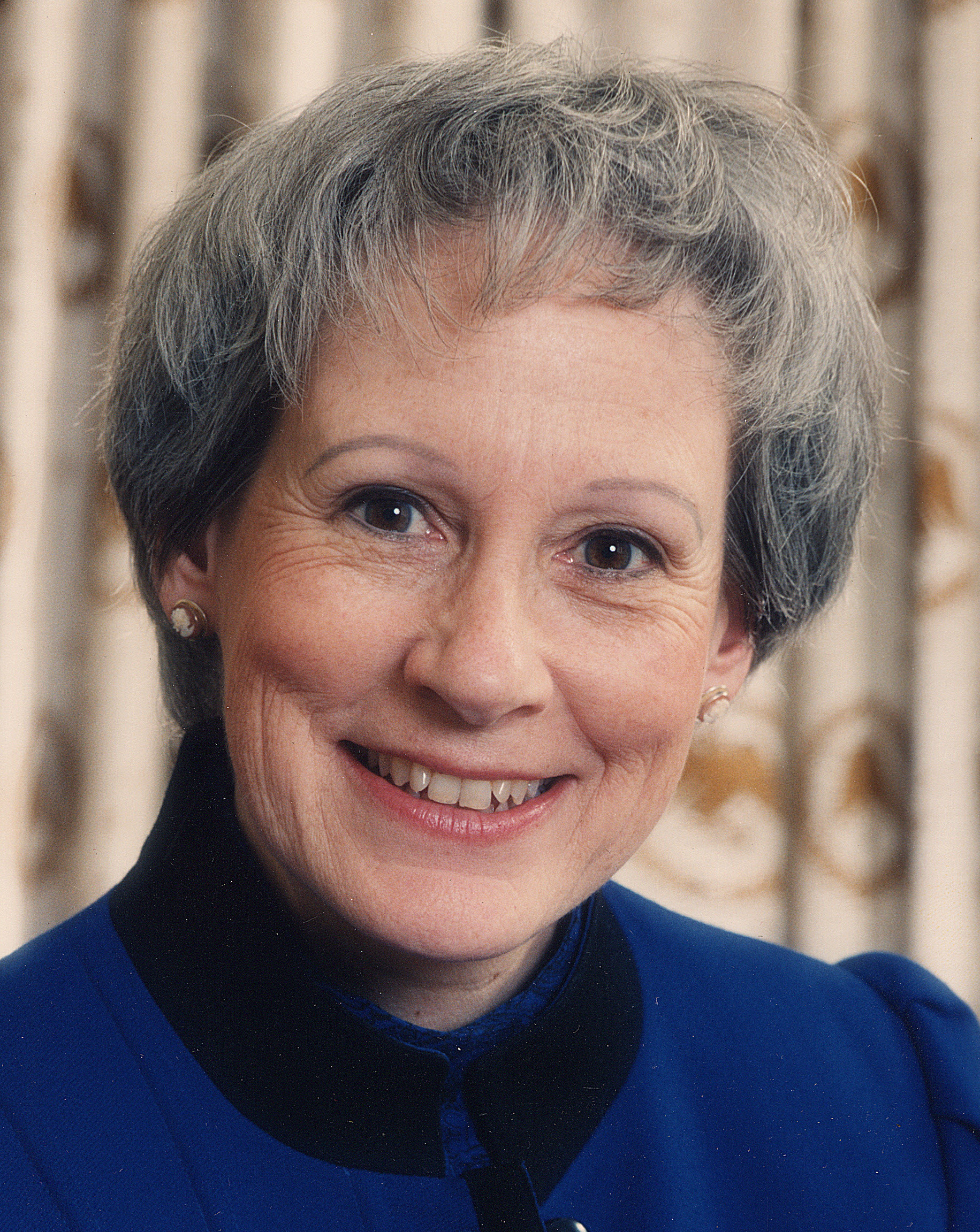
Senator
Nancy Kassebaum
from Kansas
(1978–1997)

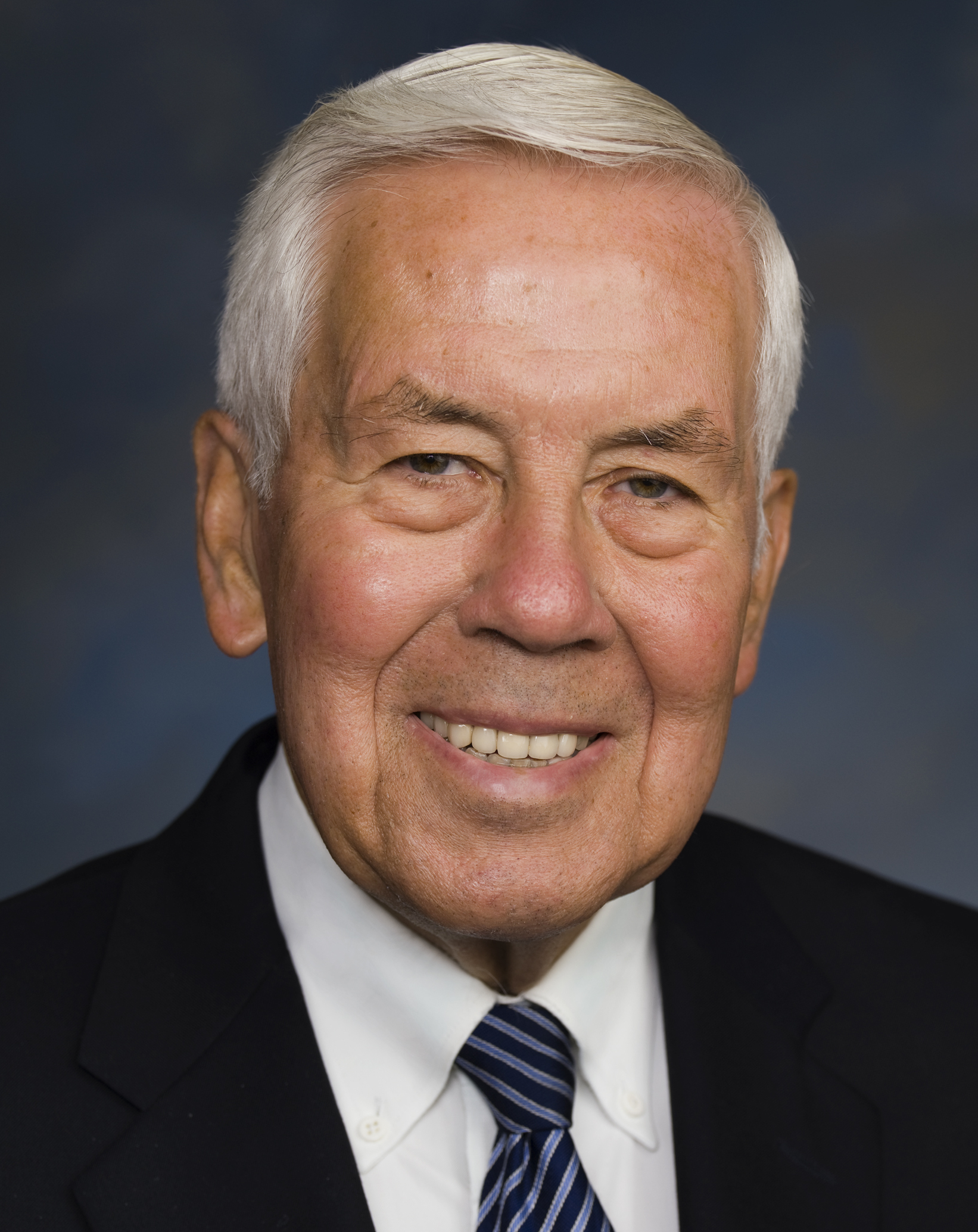
Senator
Richard Lugar
from Indiana
(1977–2013)

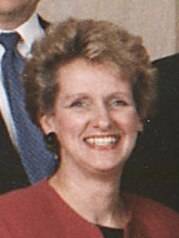
Representative
Lynn Martin
from Illinois
(1981–1991)

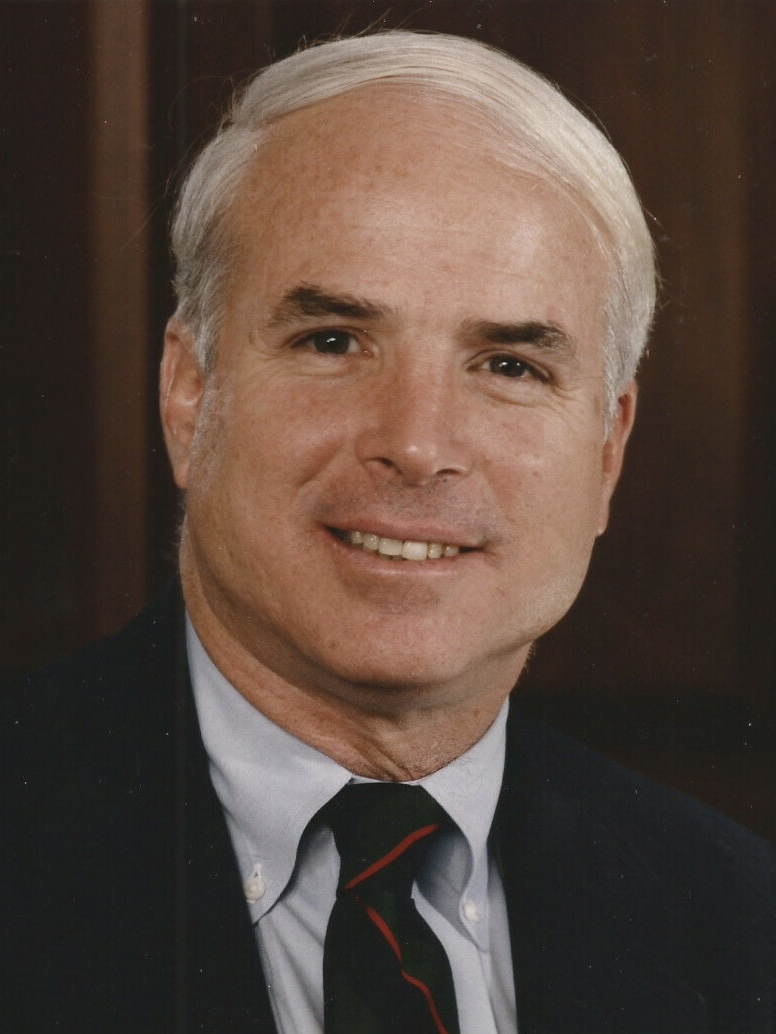
Senator
John McCain
from Arizona
(1987–2018)

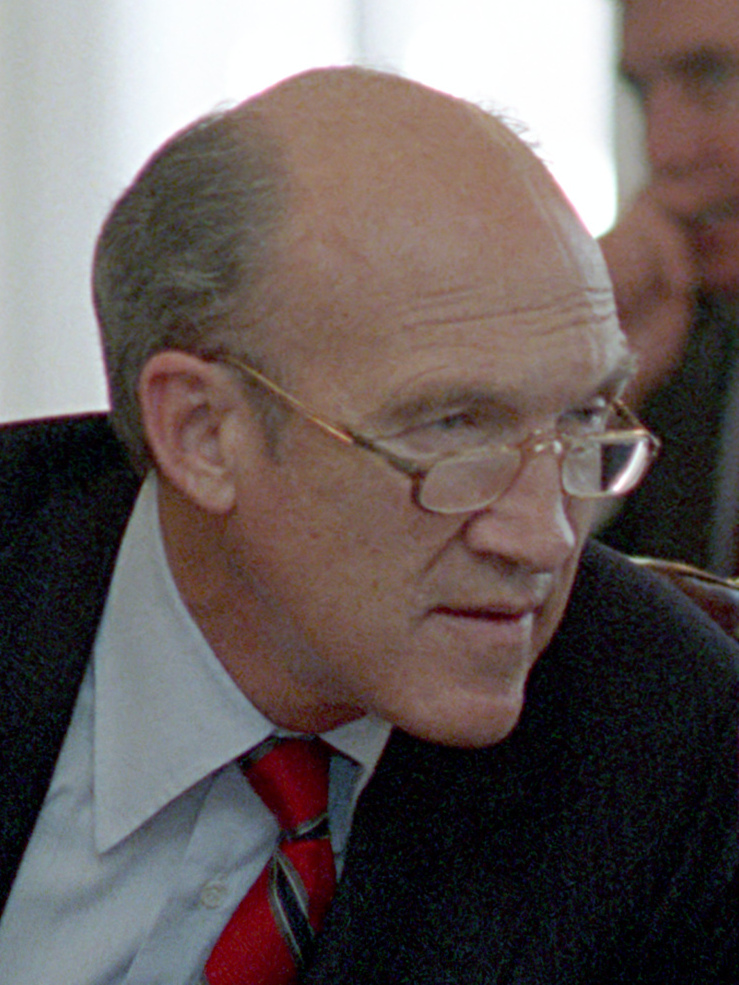
Senator
Alan K. Simpson
from Wyoming
(1979–1997)

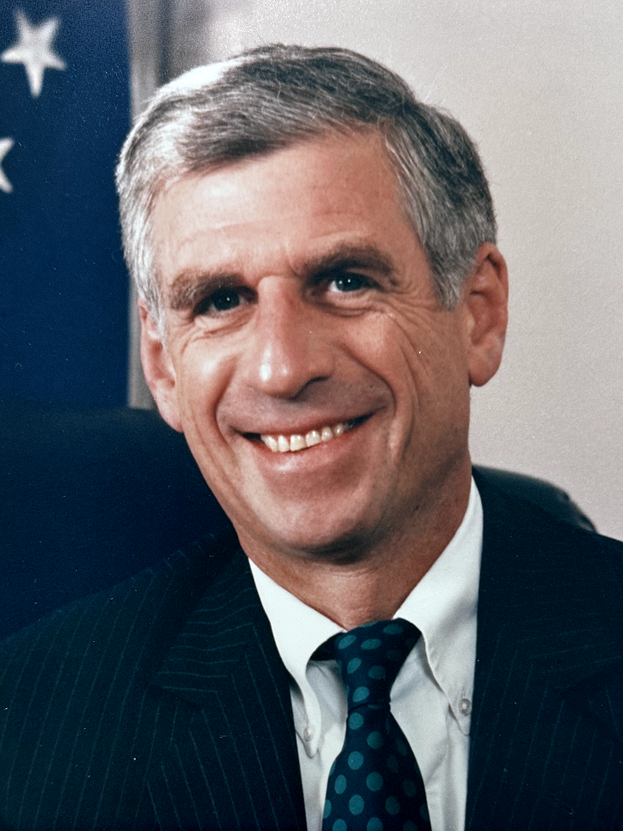
Senator
John Danforth
from Missouri
(1976–1995)

=== Governors ===
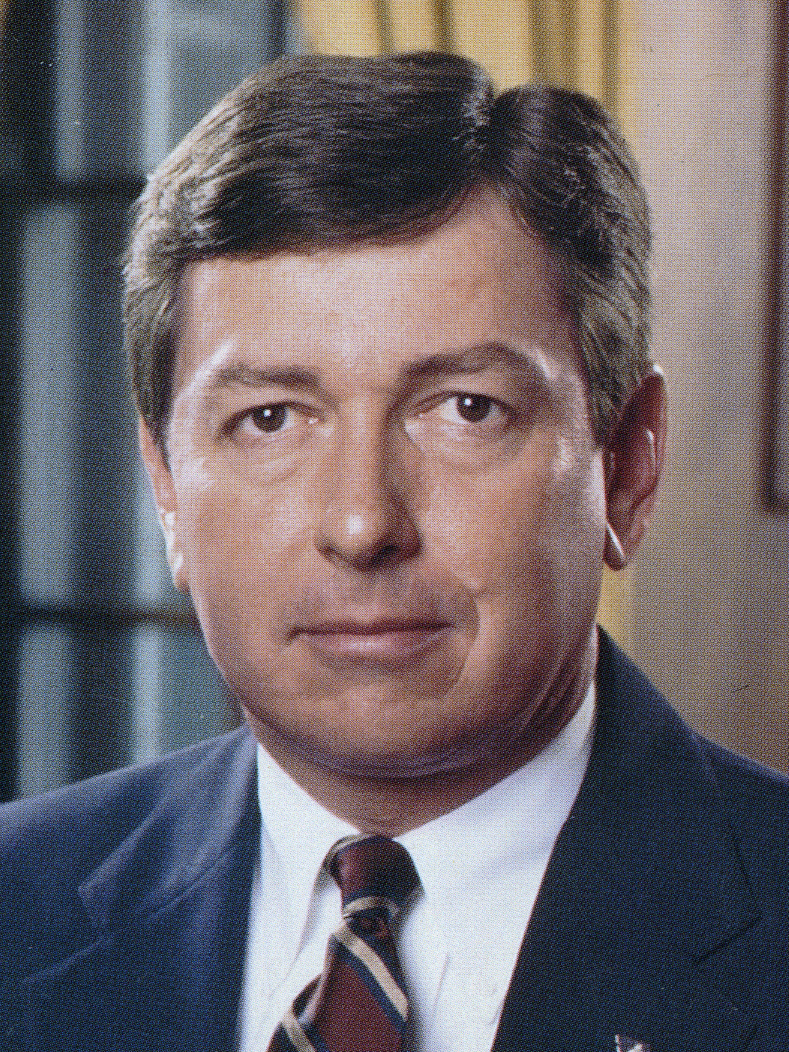
Governor
John Ashcroft
of Missouri
(1985–1993)

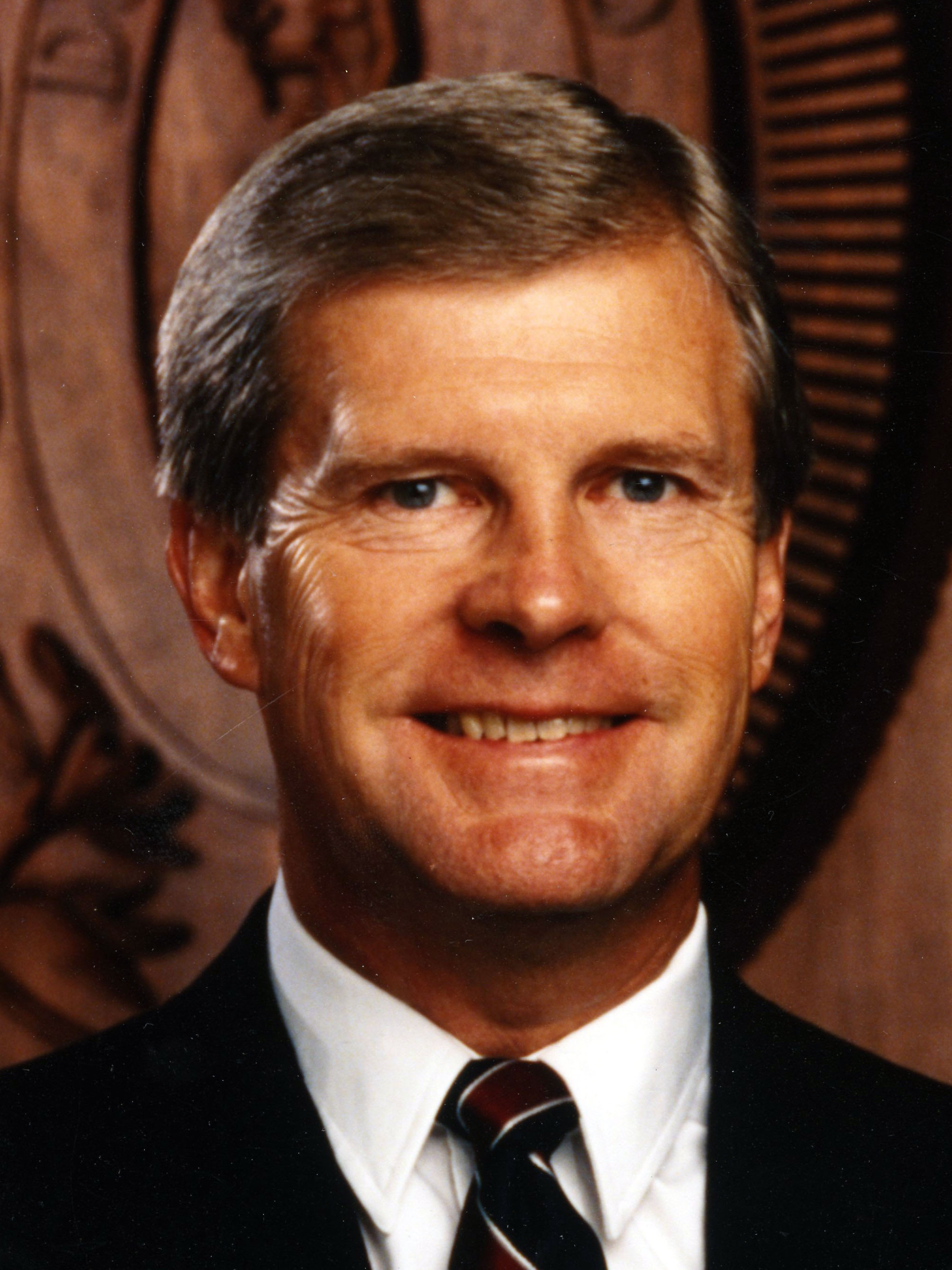
Governor
Carroll Campbell
of South Carolina
(1987–1995)

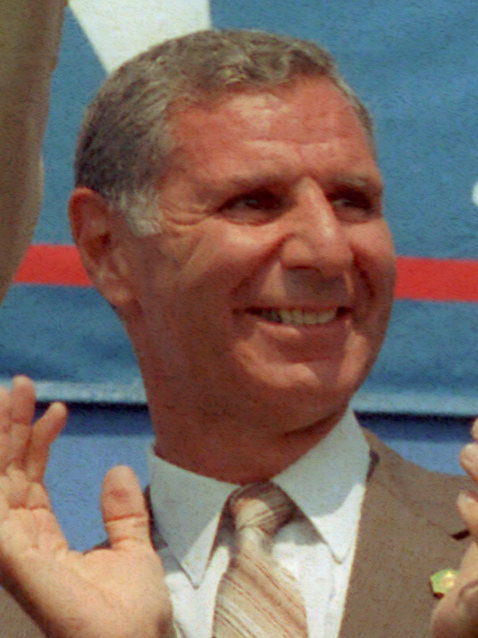
Governor
George Deukmejian
of California
(1983–1991)

Governor
Kay Orr
of Nebraska
(1987–1991)

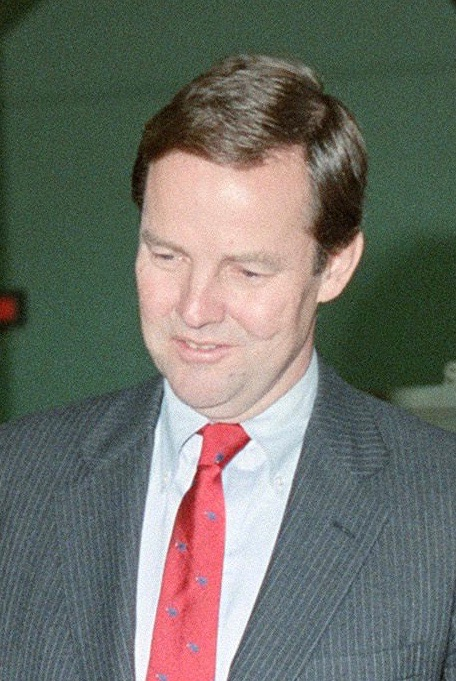
Governor
Thomas Kean
of New Jersey
(1982–1990)

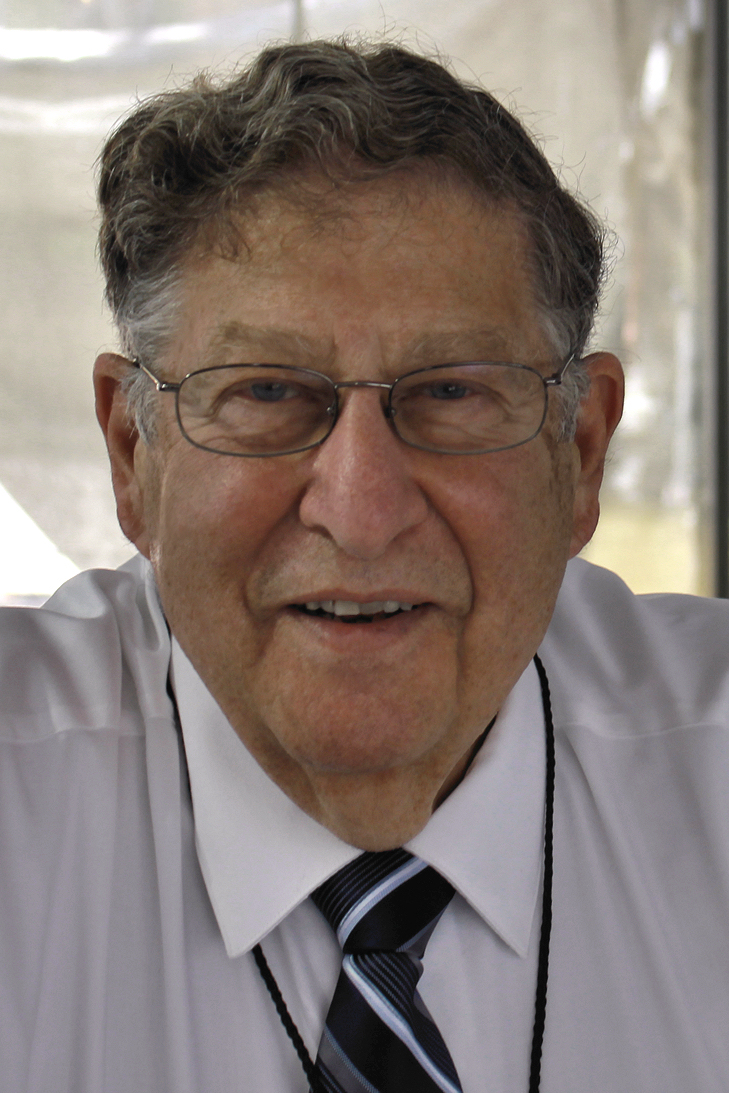
Governor
John H. Sununu
of New Hampshire
(1983–1989)

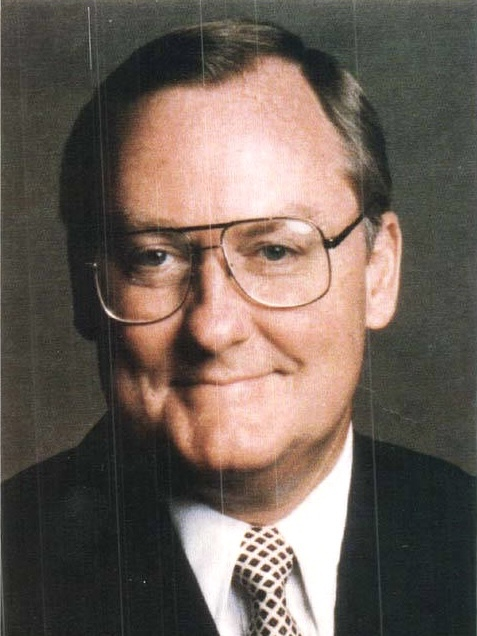
Governor
James R. Thompson
of Illinois
(1977–1991)

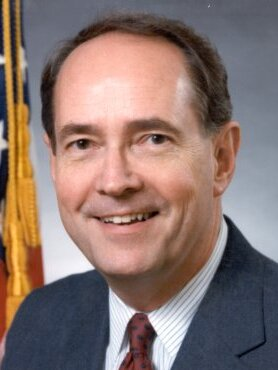
Former Governor
Richard Thornburgh
of Pennsylvania
(1979–1987)

=== Other Individuals ===
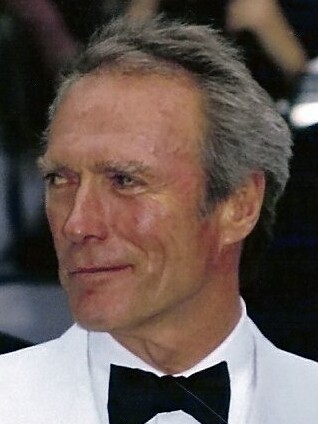
Former Mayor of
Carmel-by-the-Sea, California and Actor
Clint Eastwood
(1986–1988; 1954–present)

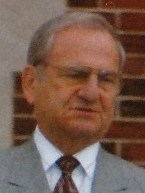
Chairman of Chrysler
Lee Iacocca
(1979–1992)

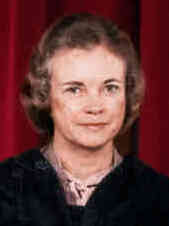
Associate Justice of the Supreme Court
Sandra Day O'Connor
(1981–2006)

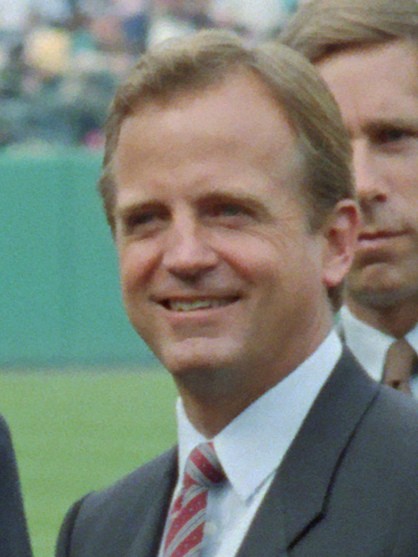
6th Commissioner of Baseball
Peter Ueberroth
(1984–1989)

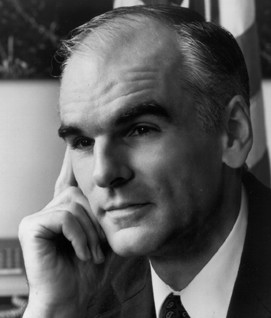
45th United States Secretary of the Interior
Donald Hodel
(1985–1989)

== See also ==
- George H. W. Bush 1988 presidential campaign
- 1988 Republican Party presidential primaries
- 1988 Republican National Convention
- 1988 United States presidential election
- List of United States major party presidential tickets
- Senator, you're no Jack Kennedy
