= 1986 United States Senate election in Indiana =

- November 4, 1986
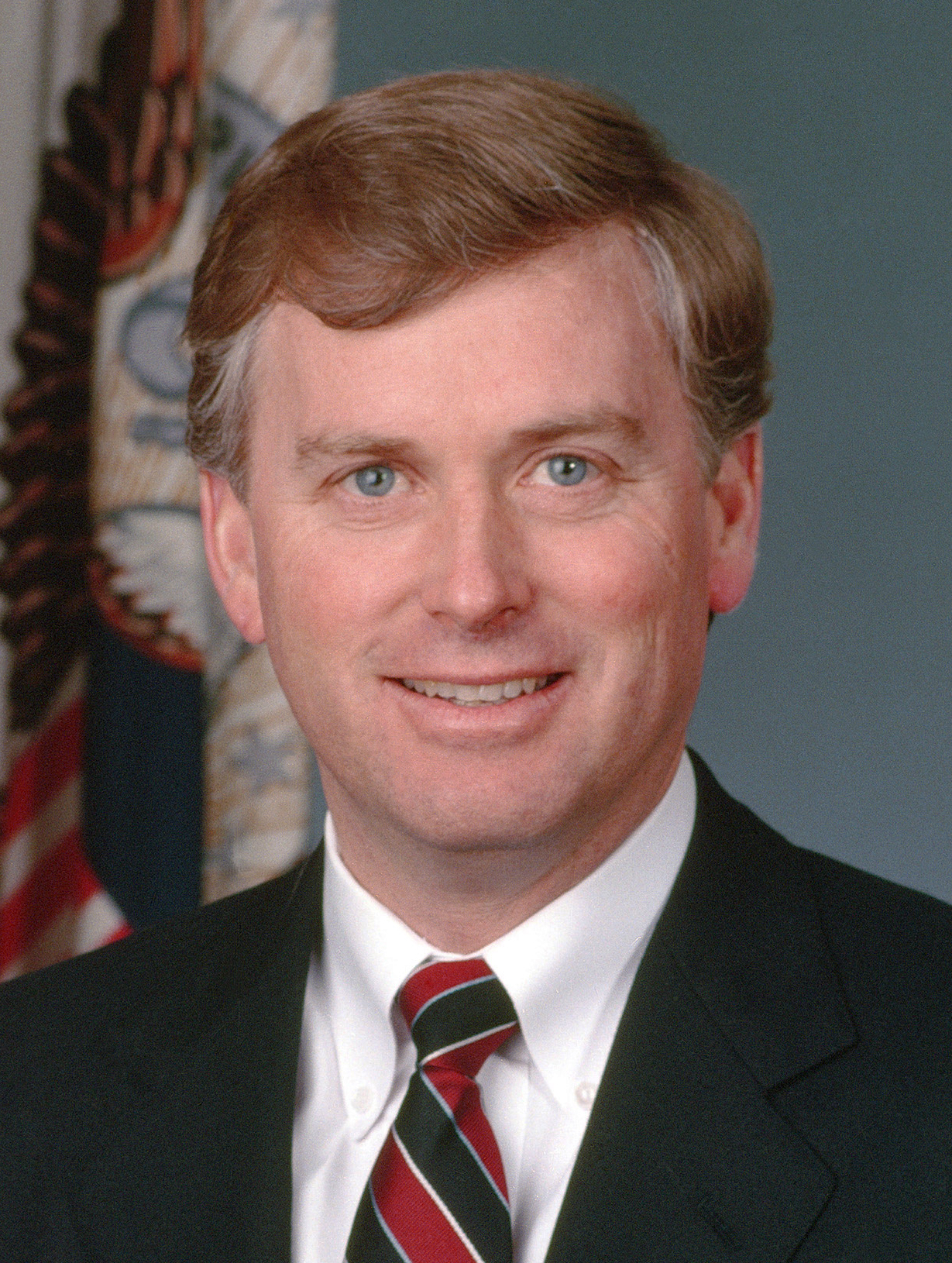

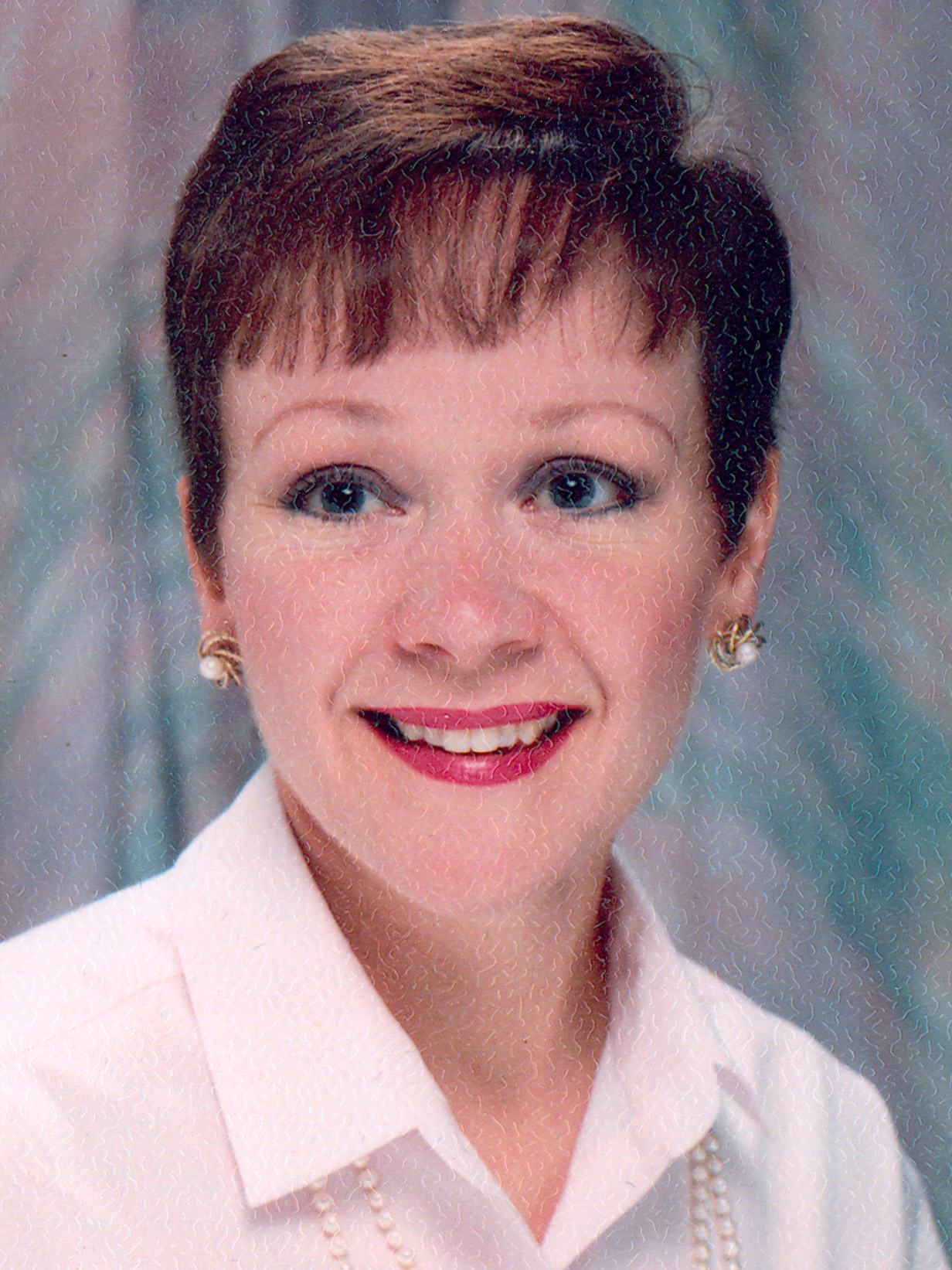
| Nominee | Dan Quayle | Jill L. Long |
| Party | Republican | Democratic |
| Popular vote | 936,143 | 595,192 |
| Percentage | 60.57% | 38.51% |
- County results Quayle: 50–60% 60–70% 70–80% Long: 50–60%
U.S. senator before election
Dan Quayle
Republican
Elected U.S. Senator
Dan Quayle
Republican

The 1986 United States Senate election in Indiana was held on November 4, 1986. Incumbent Republican U.S. Senator Dan Quayle won re-election to a second term. He served his term until 1989 when he resigned to serve as vice president.

== Major candidates ==
=== Democratic ===
- Jill L. Long, Valparaiso City Councilwoman

=== Republican ===
- Dan Quayle, incumbent U.S. Senator since 1981

== General election ==
Quayle sought reelection facing Democratic challenger Jill Long.

Pundits believed Quayle would easily win reelection. Additionally, Long struggled to fund her campaign raising just over $100,000 to Quayle's $2,200,000. A debate between the pair was held on September 7, 1986.

Minor party candidates were often left out of debates and struggled to gain recognition.

== Results ==
On election day, Quayle was reelected in a landslide.

General election results
| Party | Candidate | Votes | % |
|---|---|---|---|
| Republican | Dan Quayle (incumbent) | 936,143 | 60.57% |
| Democratic | Jill L. Long | 595,192 | 38.51% |
| Libertarian | Bradford Warren | 8,314 | 0.54% |
| American | Rockland Snyder | 5,914 | 0.38% |
| Majority | | 340,951 | 22.06% |
| Turnout | | 1,545,563 | |
| Republican hold | | | |

== Aftermath ==
Due to his and then-Vice President George H.W. Bush's victory in the 1988 presidential election, Quayle resigned from the Senate. Republican Representative Dan Coats of Indiana's 4th congressional district was appointed to fill the vacancy. Coats ran for reelection in the 1990 special election in Indiana winning the remainder of Quayle's term.

== See also ==
- 1986 United States Senate elections
