= Senator, you're no Jack Kennedy =

1988 remark made by Lloyd Bentsen

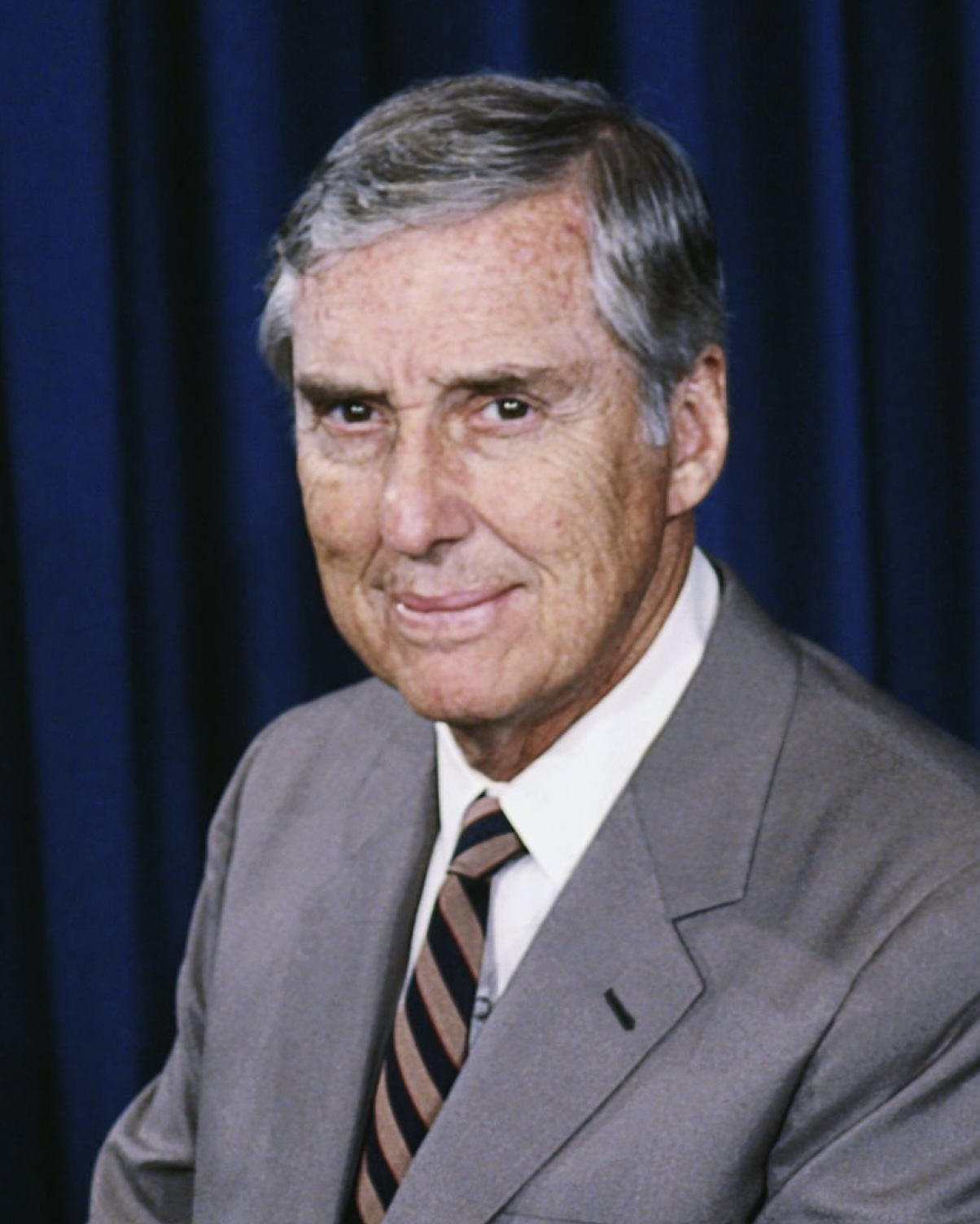
Senator Lloyd Bentsen

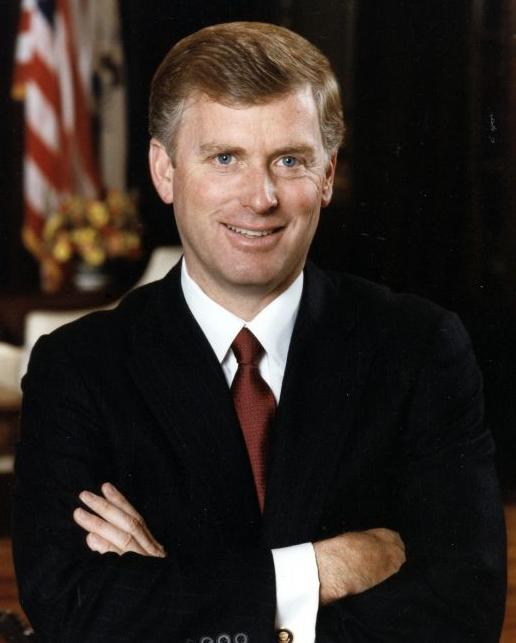
Senator Dan Quayle

"Senator, you're no Jack Kennedy" was a remark made during the 1988 United States vice presidential debate by Democratic nominee Senator Lloyd Bentsen to Republican nominee Senator Dan Quayle in response to Quayle's comparison of his experience in Congress to that of John F. Kennedy, the Democratic 35th president of the United States, whom Bentsen knew from their time as congressmen from the 80th to 82nd Congresses. Since then, the words "You're no Jack Kennedy," or some variation on the remark, have become a part of the political lexicon as a way to deflate politicians or other individuals perceived as thinking too highly of themselves. Michael Dukakis (the Democratic presidential nominee) and Bentsen later went on to lose the 1988 United States presidential election to George H. W. Bush and Quayle, who thus succeeded Bush as vice president of the United States.

== Context ==
The debate was held on October 5, 1988, at the Civic Auditorium in Omaha, Nebraska. One of the moderators, Judy Woodruff, set the stage by addressing the audience: "Based on the history since World War II, there is almost a 50–50 chance that one of the two men here tonight will become president of the United States."

From Martin Van Buren in 1836 up to the time of the debate, no sitting vice president had been elected president. Republican George H. W. Bush hoped to become the first one since that time; in the event he would succeed in being so elected a month later.

After Quayle became Bush's vice presidential running mate, questions were raised in the press about his age (he was 41 at the time); his limited term of service in the Senate; his grades in college; his National Guard duty (which Democrats claimed helped him avoid serving in the military during the Vietnam War); and his overall ability to lead the nation in the case of the incapacitation of the president, which became a central issue in the 1988 debate.

Quayle had routinely been comparing himself to Kennedy in his stump speech.

In a mock debate with Dennis E. Eckart, Bentsen used the casual remark "you're no Jack Kennedy and George Bush is no Ronald Reagan."

Quayle did not directly compare himself with Kennedy in terms of accomplishment, but in terms of length of congressional service; Quayle served for 12 years while Kennedy served for 14. When Kennedy successfully sought the Democratic nomination in 1960, he had less experience than his primary opponents, most of whom had more seniority in the Senate. While it was a statement of fact, some of Quayle's advisors suggested that this comparison could cause trouble.

== Transcript ==
The relevant portion of a transcript of the 1988 vice-presidential debates from the Commission on Presidential Debates:

Tom Brokaw: Senator Quayle, I don't mean to beat this drum until it has no more sound in it. But to follow up on Brit Hume's question, when you said that it was a hypothetical situation, it is, sir, after all, the reason that we're here tonight, because you are running not just for Vice President—(Applause)—and if you cite the experience that you had in Congress, surely you must have some plan in mind about what you would do if it fell to you to become President of the United States, as it has to so many Vice Presidents just in the last 25 years or so.

Quayle: Let me try to answer the question one more time. I think this is the fourth time that I've had this question.

Brokaw: The third time.

Quayle: Three times that I've had this question—and I will try to answer it again for you, as clearly as I can, because the question you're asking is, "What kind of qualifications does Dan Quayle have to be president," "What kind of qualifications do I have," and "What would I do in this kind of a situation?" And what would I do in this situation? ... I have far more experience than many others that sought the office of vice president of this country. I have as much experience in the Congress as Jack Kennedy did when he sought the presidency. I will be prepared to deal with the people in the Bush administration, if that unfortunate event would ever occur.

Judy Woodruff: Senator Bentsen?

Bentsen: Senator, I served with Jack Kennedy. I knew Jack Kennedy. Jack Kennedy was a friend of mine. Senator, you're no Jack Kennedy. (Prolonged shouts and applause.) What has to be done in a situation like that is to call in the—

Woodruff: (Admonishing applauders) Please, please, once again you are only taking time away from your own candidate.

Quayle: That was really uncalled for, Senator. (Shouts and applause.)

Bentsen: You are the one that was making the comparison, Senator—and I'm one who knew him well. And frankly I think you are so far apart in the objectives you choose for your country that I did not think the comparison was well-taken.

== Aftermath ==
Quayle's reaction to Bentsen's comment was played and replayed by the Democrats in their subsequent television ads as an announcer intoned: "Quayle: just a heartbeat away." It proved sure-laugh fodder for comedians, and more and more editorial cartoons depicted Quayle as a child. Saturday Night Live used a child actor to portray Quayle in several sketches.

Avoiding going head-to-head with a seasoned Bentsen, Quayle had spent the debate criticizing presidential nominee Michael Dukakis as too liberal. Quayle felt that he had successfully got that message across since Bentsen did not defend Dukakis.

The Bush–Quayle ticket defeated Dukakis–Bentsen in the presidential election by a margin of 8% of the popular vote and an electoral landslide, with the Democrats winning only ten states. Dukakis never sought elected office again, completing his term as Governor in January 1991, while Bentsen was concurrently running for and won re-election to the senate and served until his appointment as Secretary of the Treasury in January 1993.

== Legacy ==
=== United States ===
Four years later at the 1992 Republican National Convention, Ronald Reagan answered claims by Bill Clinton's campaign, while poking fun at his own age, by saying, "This fellow they've nominated claims he's the new Thomas Jefferson. Well, let me tell you something. I knew Thomas Jefferson. He was a friend of mine. And governor, you're no Thomas Jefferson."

At the 1992 vice presidential debate during his opening statement, Democratic nominee Al Gore took a humorous shot at Quayle over the Jack Kennedy comparison. Quayle was running for re-election and trying to make up for his performance in the 1988 debate. Gore was also taking a shot at President George Bush's comparisons of the accomplishments of his administration to that of Harry S. Truman. Gore said to Quayle, "I'll make you a deal this evening. If you don't try to compare George Bush to Harry Truman, I won't compare you to Jack Kennedy." The audience reacted with laughter.

In 2008, Ronald Reagan's daughter Patti Davis paraphrased the quotation in reference to a number of presidential candidates invoking her father's name during the 2008 United States presidential campaign, "Where is Lloyd Bentsen when you need him? 'I knew Ronald Reagan ... senator (or governor), you're no Ronald Reagan.'"

At the 2012 vice presidential debate, Vice President Joe Biden made a similar statement in reaction to Republican vice presidential nominee Paul Ryan's citation of a policy taken by President Kennedy. Biden quipped at Ryan, "Oh, now you're Jack Kennedy?" to laughter.

During the eleventh 2016 Republican primary debate moderated by Fox News, Ohio Governor and presidential candidate John Kasich delivered his own version of the line saying, "You know, we hear about Ronald Reagan rebuilding the military. I was there when Ronald Reagan rebuilt the military. I worked with him. I was there when Ronald Reagan rebuilt the economy. I was there, and I worked with him. I knew Ronald Reagan. And I'll leave it right there with what comes after that. You can figure that one out."

At the 2016 Democratic National Convention, former Reagan administration official Doug Elmets, referencing the presidential campaign of Donald Trump, stated, "I'm here tonight to say: I knew Ronald Reagan. I worked for Ronald Reagan. Donald Trump, you are no Ronald Reagan."

On November 25, 2017, White House Press Secretary Sarah Huckabee Sanders posted on Twitter, comparing herself to the character C. J. Cregg from The West Wing on an incident involving a situation where the White House was receiving one of the White House Thanksgiving turkeys set to be pardoned by President Donald Trump. After her tweet, actor Bradley Whitford, who portrayed White House Deputy Chief of Staff Josh Lyman on the show, replied, "I know C.J. Cregg. C.J. Cregg is a friend of mine. You're no C.J. Cregg." Actress Allison Janney, who played C.J. in the series, also replied, thanking Whitford for his sentiment.

During the 2025 New York City mayoral general election debate on October 16, 2025, Republican nominee Curtis Sliwa told former governor Andrew Cuomo: "I knew Mario Cuomo. You're no Mario Cuomo, Andrew Cuomo."

In June 2026, a protester displayed "You're No JFK" on a placard in connection with the removal of Donald Trump's name from the Kennedy Center.

=== Elsewhere ===
In October 2012, at the UK Conservative Party Conference in Birmingham, Foreign Secretary William Hague made a response to a speech that Labour leader Ed Miliband had given at his own party conference in the previous week, in which Miliband compared his party with Benjamin Disraeli's One Nation Conservatism ideology. Hague said, "To borrow a turn of phrase, we were led by Disraeli, our predecessors knew Disraeli, Disraeli was a Conservative through and through, and, Ed Miliband, you are no Disraeli."

In June 2017, after the Irish Taoiseach Leo Varadkar nominated former attorney general Maire Whelan as a judge to the Court of Appeals and was accused of pressuring President Michael D. Higgins to sign off on her confirmation, he claimed appointments like this have precedent such as in the cases of Frank Clarke, Adrian Hardiman and Donal O'Donnell. Fianna Fáil Leader Micheál Martin claimed it "stunk to high heaven" and quipped "with the greatest of respect, Máire Whelan is no Frank Clarke, is no Adrian Hardiman, and is no Donal O'Donnell."

On June 10, 2019, Canadian actor Kiefer Sutherland, grandson of former NDP leader and Saskatchewan Premier Tommy Douglas, posted a statement on Twitter, directed at Ontario Progressive Conservative Premier Doug Ford and responding to Lisa MacLeod, a Minister in Ford's government, comparing their government's provincial budget to Douglas's fiscal record. The statement included the phrase, "I knew Tommy Douglas and you Sir, are no Tommy Douglas".

=== Parodies and popular media ===
References to and parodies of the famous quotation have often appeared in popular culture.

- On an episode of Saturday Night Live, several candidates for the Democratic nomination for president of the United States were debating each other at a time when President George H. W. Bush was enjoying enormous popularity in the polls. All of the candidates tried to make the other ones look good since no one wanted to face Bush in the election. At one point, Bentsen, played by host Kiefer Sutherland, remarked, "I knew Jack Kennedy, I worked with Jack Kennedy. I am no Jack Kennedy."
- In the Seinfeld episode "The Phone Message", George says: "So I just stood there, like, remember how Quayle looked when Bentsen gave him that Kennedy line? That's what I looked like."
- In the Disney film George of the Jungle, during the wedding, Ursula's mother (Holland Taylor) — pouting over multiple appearances of gorillas — complains to her husband, "Arthur, I wish you could do something about these monkeys. I feel like Jane Goodall". Ape (voiced by John Cleese) replies, "Madam, I knew Jane Goodall, and you are no Jane Goodall."
- In the Night Court episode "This Old Man", Dan Fielding (John Larroquette), while running for the New York State Assembly, spends the night with a wealthy woman who claims to have (for similar prurient reasons) donated a large sum to John F. Kennedy's campaign; the next morning, Dan is outraged to receive a pittance in the mail, along with a note: "Dear Dan, you're no Jack Kennedy."
- In the 30 Rock episode "There's No I in America", Jack Donaghy tells Liz Lemon in a presidential-style debate: "Miss Lemon, I know Scottie Pippen. I own a Fuddruckers with Scottie Pippen. And you, sir, look like Scottie Pippen."
- In the Ugly Betty episode "Giving Up the Ghost", while chewing out Amanda, Sheila tells her, "I knew Fey Sommers. I worked with Fey Sommers. I once made out with Fey Sommers. You are no Fey Sommers." (Fey was the late editor of Mode, the magazine Betty worked for.)
- In the Justice League episode "Secret Society", the Flash attempts to interrogate a thug by dangling him off the ledge of a building. The thug jibes, "Who do you think you are, Batman? Look, buddy, I know Batman, I once ratted out a counterfeiter to Batman, and believe me, you are no Batman."
- In the 2001 film Black Knight, Martin Lawrence's character Jamal gives a speech criticizing one of the film's antagonists, saying, "King Leo. He thinks he's King Arthur. Well I know King Arthur. And you, King Leo, are no King Arthur!"
- The Megadeth song "I Know Jack" from the album The System Has Failed contains the soundbite.
