= Confederate Soldiers and Sailors Monument =

Confederate Soldiers and Sailors Monument may refer to

- Confederate Soldiers and Sailors Monument (Baltimore)
- Confederate Soldiers and Sailors Monument (Birmingham, Alabama)
- Confederate Soldiers and Sailors Monument (Georgetown, Texas)
- Confederate Soldiers and Sailors Monument (Indianapolis)
