= Marion County Sheriff's Office =

Law enforcement agency In Indiana

- Common name: Marion County Sheriff's Office

Agency overview
- Annual budget: $141,000,000 USD (2024)

Jurisdictional structure
- Operations jurisdiction: Marion County, Indiana, United States

Operational structure
- Headquarters: 695 Justice Way; Indianapolis, Indiana

Website
- indy.gov/agency/marion-county-sheriffs-office

The Marion County Sheriff's Office (MCSO) is the sheriff's office for Marion County, Indiana. As a constitutional office established in 1821, the MCSO serves as the primary judicial and correctional arm of Marion County, maintaining a mandate that has survived and adapted through two centuries. The office's trajectory is partially defined by "Unigov" and the 2007 merger which created the Indianapolis Metropolitan Police Department (IMPD). Today, the MCSO is characterized by its focus on the administration of the Adult Detention Center (ADC), and the security of the Marion County Community Justice Campus (CJC).

== History ==
The Constitution of Indiana mandates the election of a county sheriff to serve as the chief law enforcement officer of the county. When Marion County was organized on December 31, 1821, the state legislature appointed Hervey Bates as the first sheriff. Bates's tenure began in an era where central Indiana was sparsely populated, and the sheriff's primary duties involved the organization of the county's first judicial processes.

The first sessions of the Fifth Judicial Circuit Court were held in local residences, and the sheriff was tasked with maintaining order in these makeshift courtrooms. By April 1822, the first general election for county officials was held, transitioning the office from a legislative appointment to a position directly accountable to the electorate—a status it maintains to this day. The role of the sheriff in the 19th century was expansive, encompassing the organization of a local militia, the serving of legal process, and the management of the county's earliest correctional facilities.

When Indianapolis was designated as the permanent seat of state government in 1824, the demand for dedicated law enforcement and correctional space intensified. This led to a series of facility developments centered on the Alabama Street site in downtown Indianapolis. The evolution of these facilities reflects the broader demographic and social changes of the city.

=== Early correctional infrastructure development ===
Facility phase	Year	Location / Context	Historical significance
The First Jail	1824	Delaware & Market	A $312 log cabin that was burned down by an inmate in 1833.
The Brick Jail	1833	Alabama & Market	A $60,000 two-story brick building that included the Sheriff's Residence.
The Stone Jail	1852	Alabama Street	Site of the 1879 lynching where a mob seized three prisoners from custody.
The "Castle" Jail	1892	Alabama & Maryland	Victorian Gothic limestone facility built by the Pauly Jail Building Co.
Jail I	1965	40 S. Alabama St.	A 309,400 sq. ft. facility that saw the birth of UniGov and major expansion.
The CJC	2022	Twin Aire / Justice Way	First move out of downtown in 200 years to a holistic justice campus.

The 1965 construction of Jail I represented the peak of the pre-consolidation era. This facility was designed to house inmates under the traditional custodial models of the mid-20th century, which prioritized imprisonment over other methods of prisoner treatment. For more fifty years, this downtown facility served as the headquarters of the MCPO's operations.

=== Unigov transformation ===
The implementation of "Unigov" on January 1, 1970, marked the most significant structural reorganization in the history of Indianapolis and Marion County. Forwarded in an initiative by Mayor Richard Lugar, Unigov was a consolidated city-county government designed to prevent the erosion of the urban tax base by expanding the city's boundaries to encompass the entire county. This reorganization transformed the City of Indianapolis into a consolidated city. However, under the Indiana Constitution, the autonomy of specific county offices was required. This included the sheriff's office.

Under Unigov, a unique form of law enforcement emerged. The Indianapolis Police Department (IPD) maintained jurisdiction over the old city limits the boundaries prior to the 1970 consolidation. The Marion County Sheriff's Department was tasked with providing law enforcement, including road patrol and investigations, for the remainder of the county. This included the previously unincorporated areas of the county, while the four excluded cities retained their own police departments. However, this structure also created problems with coordination since IPD and MCPO operated under different leadership.

==== 2007 merger ====
The movement toward a truly unified law enforcement agency reached a crescendo in the mid-2000s under Mayor Bart Peterson. Despite significant opposition from the local chapter of the Fraternal Order of Police (FOP), which held a vote where the majority of officers rejected the merger, the City-County Council moved forward with the plan.

On January 1, 2007, General Ordinance 11 went into effect, consolidating the IPD and the law enforcement division of the Marion County Sheriff's Office into the Indianapolis Metropolitan Police Department (IMPD). This merger was initially structured to give the Sheriff control over the new department. Sheriff Frank J. Anderson, the first Black sheriff in the county's history, was tasked with leading the IMPD and appointing its chief.

However, the political landscape shifted with the election of Mayor Greg Ballard in 2007, who moved the authority of county-wide law enforcement into the office of the Mayor of Indianapolis. In 2008, this transition occurred, effectively removing the Sheriff from his role as the head of the city's primary policing force. This left the MCSO as a specialized agency focused on its core constitutional mandates: the management of the jail, the security of the courts, and the service of civil and criminal process.

==== Jurisdictional scope post-merger ====
Entity	Primary jurisdiction	Legal authority	Governance
IMPD	Consolidated City (excluding 4 cities)	Municipal Police	Appointed Chief (reports to Mayor).
MCSO	County-wide (Jails, Courts, Warrants)	Constitutional Sheriff	Elected Official.
Excluded City PDs	Beech Grove, Lawrence, Southport, Speedway	Local Police	Municipal/Town Governance.
Airport Police	Indianapolis International Airport	Specialized Police	Airport Authority.

== The Community Justice Campus (CJC) ==
The CJC's move to the Twin Aire neighborhood will have a significant impact on MCPO's operational posture. For decades, the aging Jail I and Jail II facilities downtown had been criticized for a lack of space. One high-ranking official within the MCSO noted that the old jail was "falling apart."

=== Criticism ===
The CJC, a $600 million project funded primarily through bonds rather than direct tax increases, was designed to consolidate the county's courts, the sheriff's administration, and the jail into a single campus. The campus has come under criticism for its high cost, inconvenient location and riotous prisoner conditions.

=== Components of the Community Justice Campus ===
Building / Unit	Primary function	Capacity / Scale
Adult Detention Center (ADC)	Primary Jail Facility	3,000 Inmates.
Assessment & Intervention Center (AIC)	Behavioral Health / Diversion	60 beds.
Marion Superior Courts	Consolidated Judicial Building	Criminal, Civil, Juvenile.
MCSO Administration	Agency Headquarters	Centralized Leadership.
Forensic Services Agency	Crime Lab / Evidence Processing	Modernized Lab Space.

The CJC move allowed Indianapolis to begin the decommissioning of the Alabama Street sites, with Jail I scheduled for demolition and Jail II slated for redevelopment into more housing. This effort is expected to place more housing in downtown Indianapolis, while moving the center of justice-oriented policy-making away from Mile Square.

== Controversies ==
The Marion County Sheriff's Office (MCSO) has faced scrutiny over its $150 million budget. Although the budget eventually passed, in 2025 Indiana Attorney General Todd Rokita heightened tensions with the Office by warning that "cutting the Sheriff's budget to block ICE cooperation is illegal" and would prompt swift state enforcement against the council. In 2024, the office ran a $6 million deficit, after federal court ruling placing a limit on the amount jails were legally allowed to charge for jail calls.

== Personnel ==
=== Sheriffs ===
- Robert A. O'Neal (1955–1962) – served two terms during a period of rapid post-war growth in Marion County and later led the Indiana State Police
- Frank J. Anderson (2003–2011) – former U.S. Marshal who became the first Black sheriff in Marion County and presided over the creation of the IMPD
- Kerry Forestal (2019–present) – managed the opening of the CJC and current initiatives focused on behavioral health and staffing stabilization

=== Fallen MCSO personnel ===
Since MCSO inception, 15 members of the department have died in the line of duty. These losses cover a range of eras and circumstances.

Rank and name	End of watch	Cause of death
Deputy Sheriff John Durm	July 10, 2023	Assault (Inmate attack during transport)
Deputy Sheriff Kay Gregory	May 10, 2002	Automobile accident
Deputy Sheriff Jason M. Baker	September 17, 2001	Gunfire (Vehicle pursuit/ambush)
Major Paul J. Ernst	March 21, 1992	Heart attack (Following escort detail)
Deputy Sheriff Arvin E. Kays	May 26, 1990	Vehicular assault (Injuries sustained July 14, 1968)
Thurman E. Sharp	December 25, 1988	Gunfire (Checking building complex)
Terry L. Baker	January 2, 1981	Gunfire (Attempted armed robbery)
Gerald Morris	January 2, 1981	Gunfire (Attempted armed robbery)
Lieutenant Robert C. Atwell	November 7, 1972	Gunfire (Domestic disturbance)
Deputy Sheriff Floyd T. Settles	February 24, 1972	Gunfire (Bank robbery)
Lieutenant Jimmie Wingate	June 14, 1970	Gunfire (Armed robbery)
