= Confederate Soldiers and Sailors Monument (Georgetown, Texas) =

Confederate memorial in Georgetown, Texas, U.S.

- United States
- The monument in 2014
- Used for those deceased
- Established: 1916
- Location: 30°38′12.5″N 97°40′39″W near Georgetown, Texas

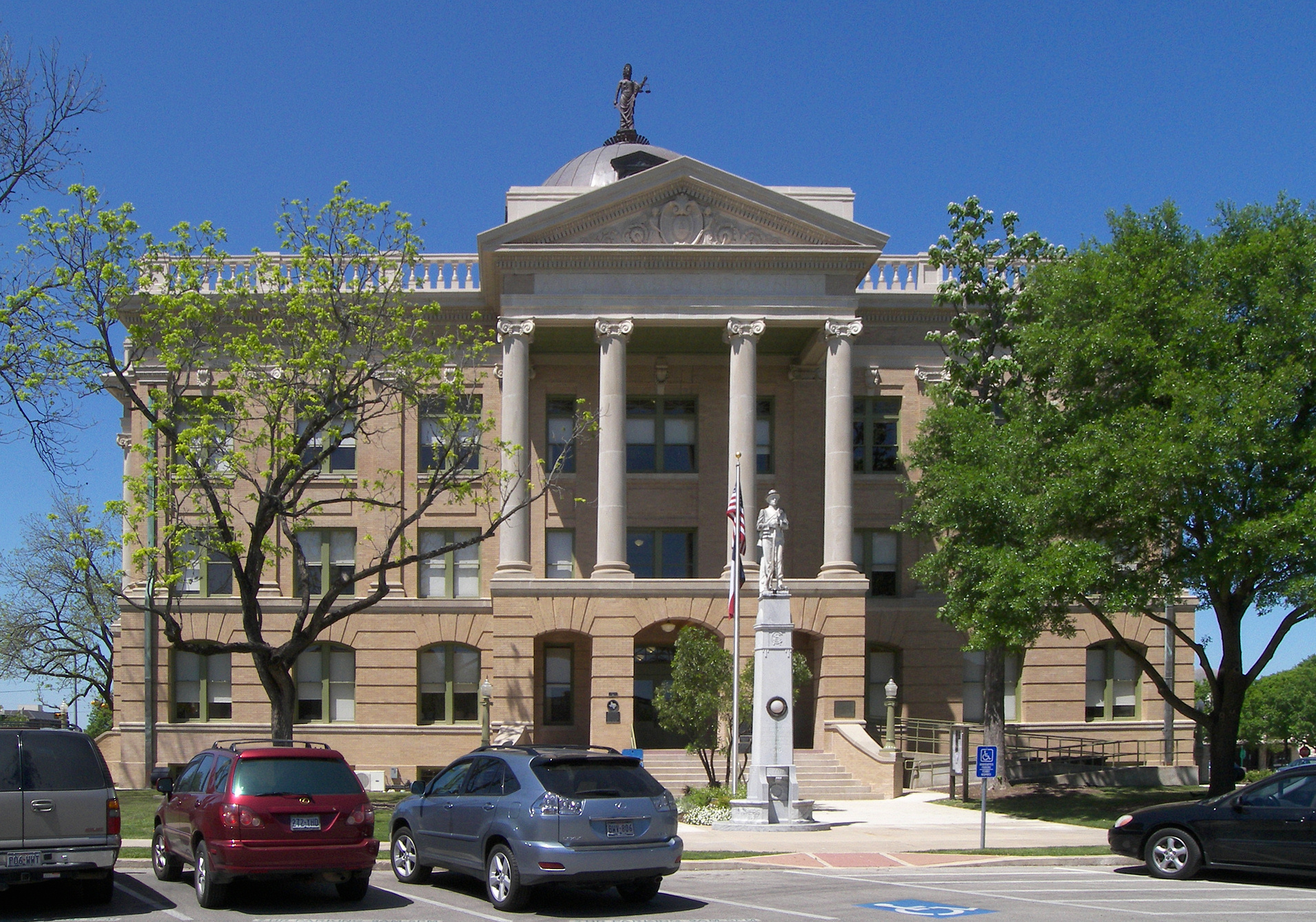
The monument in 2008

The Confederate Soldiers and Sailors Monument is an outdoor Confederate memorial installed outside the Williamson County Courthouse in Georgetown, Texas, United States.

== History ==
The monument was installed in 1916.

An anti-racism group, Courageous Conversations, "wants to put a plaque next to the statue addressing slavery as part of the Civil War. Members say the statue, in its current state, represents slavery. Currently, another plaque sits outside the courthouse referring to African-Americans as 'pioneer settlers.'" Williamson County Commissioners voted 4–1 not to allow the plaque, which would require the approval of the Texas Historical Commission in any event. "The commissioners expressed a desire to discuss the issue more, or even consider erecting a civil rights statue."

== See also ==
- 1916 in art
- List of Confederate monuments and memorials
- Removal of Confederate monuments and memorials
