= Mt. Pisgah Lutheran Church =

Historic church in Indiana, United States

- Mount Pisgah Lutheran Church
- U.S. National Register of Historic Places
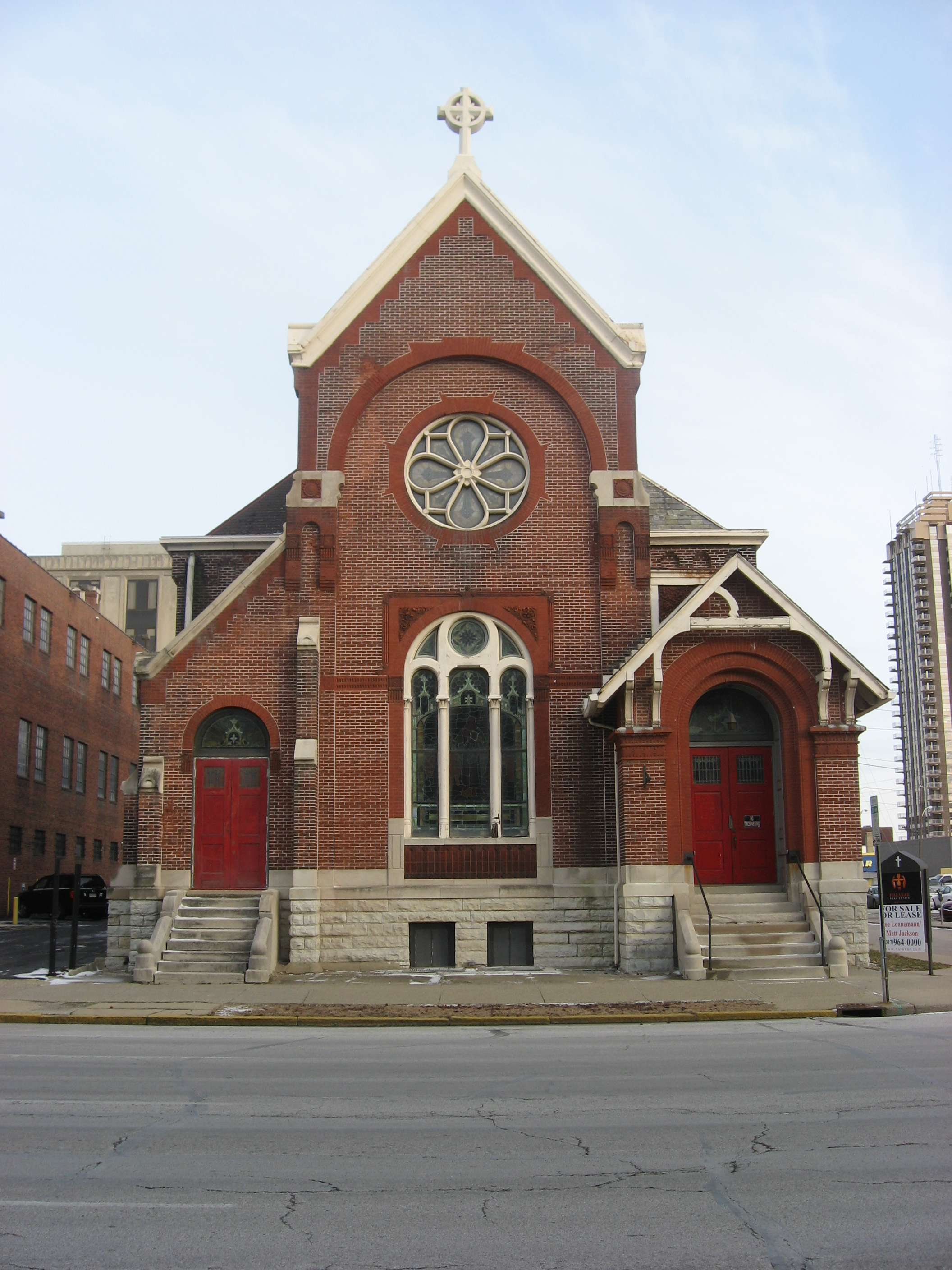
- Former Mount Pisgah Lutheran Church, January 2010

- Location within Indianapolis Location within Indianapolis Location within the United States
- Location: 701 N. Pennsylvania Street, Indianapolis, Indiana
- Coordinates: 39°46′37″N 86°9′20″W
- Area: less than one acre
- Built: 1875, 1885-86
- Architect: Cookingham, Peter P.
- Architectural style: Late Gothic Revival, Romanesque Revival
- Demolished: December 24, 2024
- NRHP reference No.: 78000048
- Added to NRHP: November 28, 1978

Mount Pisgah Lutheran Church, also known in its early years as the First Lutheran Church and First English Lutheran Church, was located at 701 North Pennsylvania Street in downtown Indianapolis, Indiana. The historic church was built by the city's first Lutheran congregation, which organized in 1837, and was its third house of worship. The former church building was subsequently operated as a for-profit event venue under the name The Sanctuary on Penn until it was destroyed by a fire on December 24, 2024.

The red-brick structure was notable because it combined two styles of architecture, Late Gothic Revival and Romanesque Revival, which were popular styles for religious buildings in the late nineteenth century. The L-shaped church was built in two sections. The original chapel, which dated from 1874 to 1875, was a Late Gothic Revival-style building. The Romanesque Revival-style main sanctuary was completed in 1887 on a limestone foundation laid in 1875. The sanctuary featured round-arched windows, a rose window, and brick buttresses with limestone caps. The church was listed on the National Register of Historic Places in 1978.

== History ==
Pastor Abraham Reck organized the city's first Lutheran congregation in 1837 and served as its pastor until 1841. Eventually, the congregation became known as the Mount Pisgah Evangelical Lutheran, First English Lutheran, and First Lutheran Church. The congregation built three churches in downtown Indianapolis at different times and in three different locations. The cornerstone for the congregation's first church at Meridian and Ohio Streets was laid in April 1838. The congregation's second church, which cost $3,000, stood at Alabama and New York Streets. Both of these buildings were later demolished.

For its third church, the Lutheran congregation acquired a lot at the corner of Pennsylvania and Walnut Streets in 1874 for $2,500. The building was constructed in two sections. The chapel dates from 1874 to 1875; the sanctuary was completed in 1887 on a foundation laid in 1874–75. Peter Cookingham was the architect of the chapel. The main sanctuary's architect is not known for certain. Cookingham may have drawn the plans for the sanctuary, but he had left Indianapolis by the time it was completed in 1887.

In March 1970, the congregation voted to sell its North Pennsylvania Street property and relocate east of the downtown area; however, at a meeting held in September 1973, the congregation reversed the decision and remained at the church for several more years. The building was added to the National Register of Historic Places in 1978. Its final owners operated the facility, called The Sanctuary on Penn, as a for-profit venue for weddings and other special events.

On December 24, 2024, around 5:30 AM, the historic church caught fire and was heavily damaged. Later that day, the building was demolished as part of an emergency demolition due to the extent of the damages. As of December 24, 2024, the cause of the fire remains under investigation.

== Description ==
The building, which was constructed in two sections, was notable for its combination of two popular styles of architecture for religious buildings in the late nineteenth century. The first section of the L-shaped, red-brick building was a small, Late Gothic Revival-style chapel dating from 1874 to 1875. Construction on the second section, a Romanesque Revival-style main sanctuary, began in 1885 and was completed in 1886 on a limestone foundation that was laid in 1874–75. The two structures were attached at the southeast corner of the sanctuary. The main sanctuary on North Pennsylvania Street faced west; the attached chapel on Walnut Street faced south.

Few alterations to the building had been made since its completion in 1886. A pipe organ was installed in 1898 on a raised platform behind the altar. In 1915, the church's plain windows were replaced with stained glass. The renovation also included excavation under the sanctuary and a concrete floor to provide space for classrooms and restrooms on the lower level. In addition, an entrance to the basement was added to the building's south elevation.

=== Exterior ===
The Gothic Revival-style chapel was constructed of red brick with a limestone foundation. Brick buttresses were constructed on its corners. The chapel featured a steep, gable roof of slate and tall, narrow windows with two-story arches. The south façade facing Walnut Street had tall, stained-glass windows flanking a larger one. The chapel's entrance featured double doors inset with stained-glass windows. (The chapel's original entrance had double doors with a transom above the entrance that contained the words, Luther Chapel.)

The Romanesque Revival-style main sanctuary was constructed of red brick with a limestone foundation. It featured round-arched windows, a stained-glass rose window, and brick buttresses with limestone caps. The main building's slate roof was framed with wood timbers. The front façade's arched and segmented stained-glass window were installed beneath a stained-glass rose window that dominated the center section. The front façade's two double-door entrances with stained-glass transoms flanked the center section. The southwest entrance had a gable-roof porch supported by wooden brackets. The church had a single cross the peak of the gable roof.

The sanctuary's north and south elevations included four stained-glass windows with rounded arches set in recessed panels. The brick buttresses with limestone caps separated the arched panels. In addition, the upper-most level on the north and south elevations, near the front façade, each included three, round-arched openings with wooden louvers. These may have been intended to house church bells that were never installed.

=== Interior ===
The sanctuary's simple interior included a large stained-glass window on the west wall that depicted Jesus Christ as the Good Shepherd. A Moeller Organ Company pipe organ originally covered the apse; it was moved to the front of the sanctuary, behind the altar, in 1898 and relocated to the rear of the sanctuary during a later renovation to the church.

During renovations made in 1915, the church's plain glass was replaced with stained glass and its electrical fixtures were replaced with gas fixtures. In addition, the second floor above the original chapel was remodeled to create classrooms and the ground beneath the sanctuary was excavated and concrete floor added to create space for classrooms and restrooms. A later renovation included the addition of a false ceiling in the sanctuary. In the 1970s the basement was repainted and the chapel was redecorated.

== Church mission and later use ==
When the church was active as a Lutheran congregation, it helped establish five other congregations in the city: Zion United Church of Christ (1841), Pleasant View Lutheran Church (1844), Gethsemane Lutheran Church (1921), Bethlehem Lutheran Church (1923), and First Latvian Church (1947). The Lutheran congregation also contributed to the development of the Lutheran church in Indiana. In 1920 the Lutheran convention that organized the Indiana Synod was held at the church and the first administrative offices of the Indiana-Kentucky Synod were housed there.

The First Lutheran Church also provided outreach services and community development efforts. After World War II it sponsored Estonian immigrants to Indianapolis and at one time offered Estonian language religious services. The Indianapolis Near East Side Community Organization (NESCO) organized at the church building in 1970.

The facility was last used for a for-profit, private event venue named The Sanctuary on Penn, until the fire on December 24, 2024, destroyed it.

== See also ==
- National Register of Historic Places listings in Center Township, Marion County, Indiana
