= Confederate Soldiers and Sailors Monument (Indianapolis) =

Monument to the Confederate POWs in Indianapolis

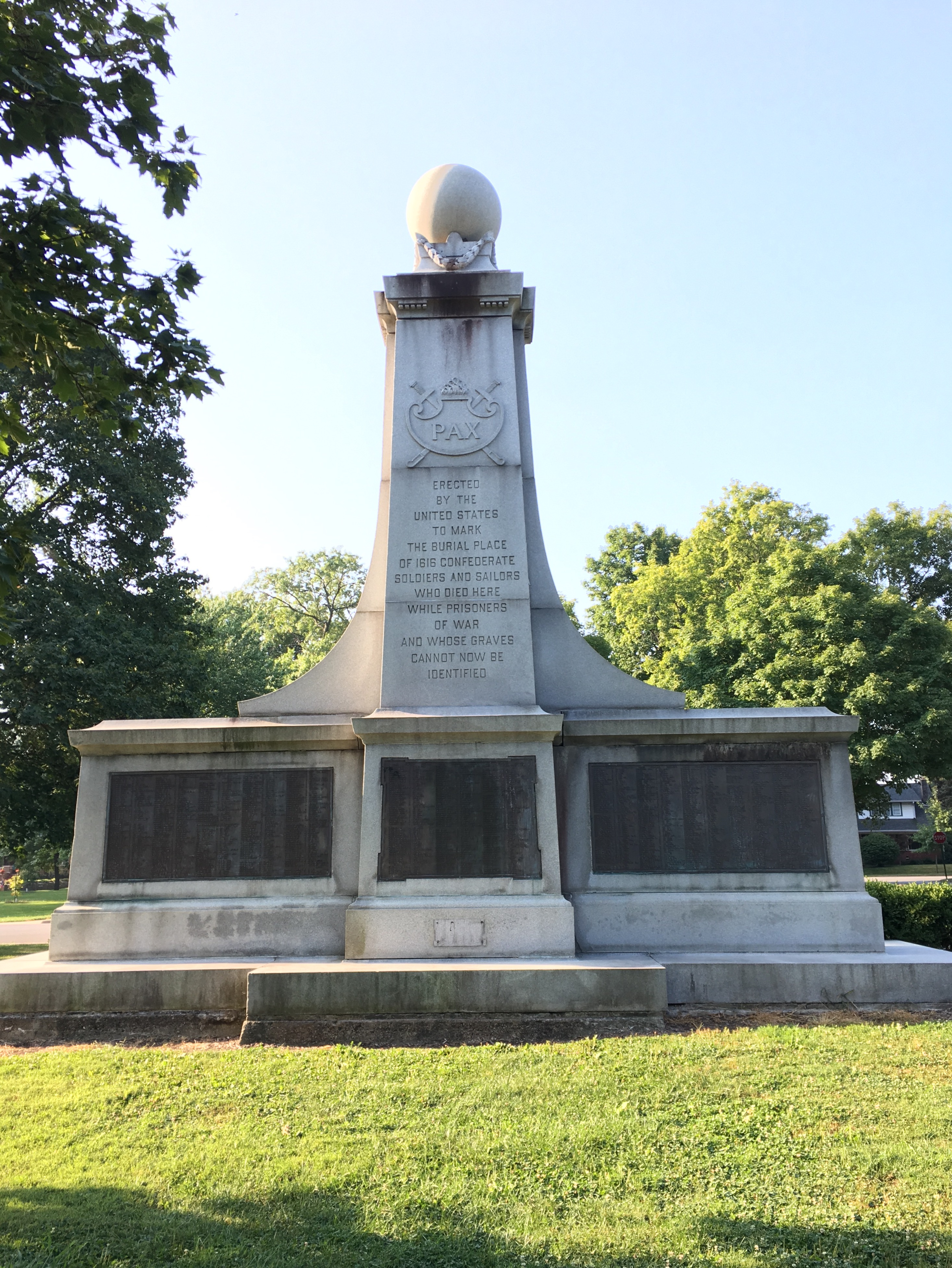
- North face of the monument in 2017
- Location: Garfield Park, Indianapolis, Indiana, US
- Coordinates: 39°43′51″N 86°08′38″W
- Material: Granite
- Width: 20 feet (6.1 m)
- Height: 35–40 feet (11–12 m)
- Completion date: 1912 (at Greenlawn Cemetery); 1928 (moved to Garfield Park)
- Dismantled date: June 8, 2020

The Confederate Soldiers and Sailors Monument (or Garfield Park Confederate Prisoner of War Monument) was a large granite monument that sat at the south entrance of Garfield Park in Indianapolis for nearly a century, before being removed in 2020. It commemorated the Confederate prisoners of war that died at Camp Morton. At 35 feet (11 m) tall and located in the city's oldest public park, it had been the most prominent of the very few Confederate memorials in the Union state of Indiana. It was dismantled and removed by the city of Indianapolis in June 2020 after a yearslong debate, part of a national wave of removal of Confederate memorials during the Black Lives Matter movement.

== Background ==
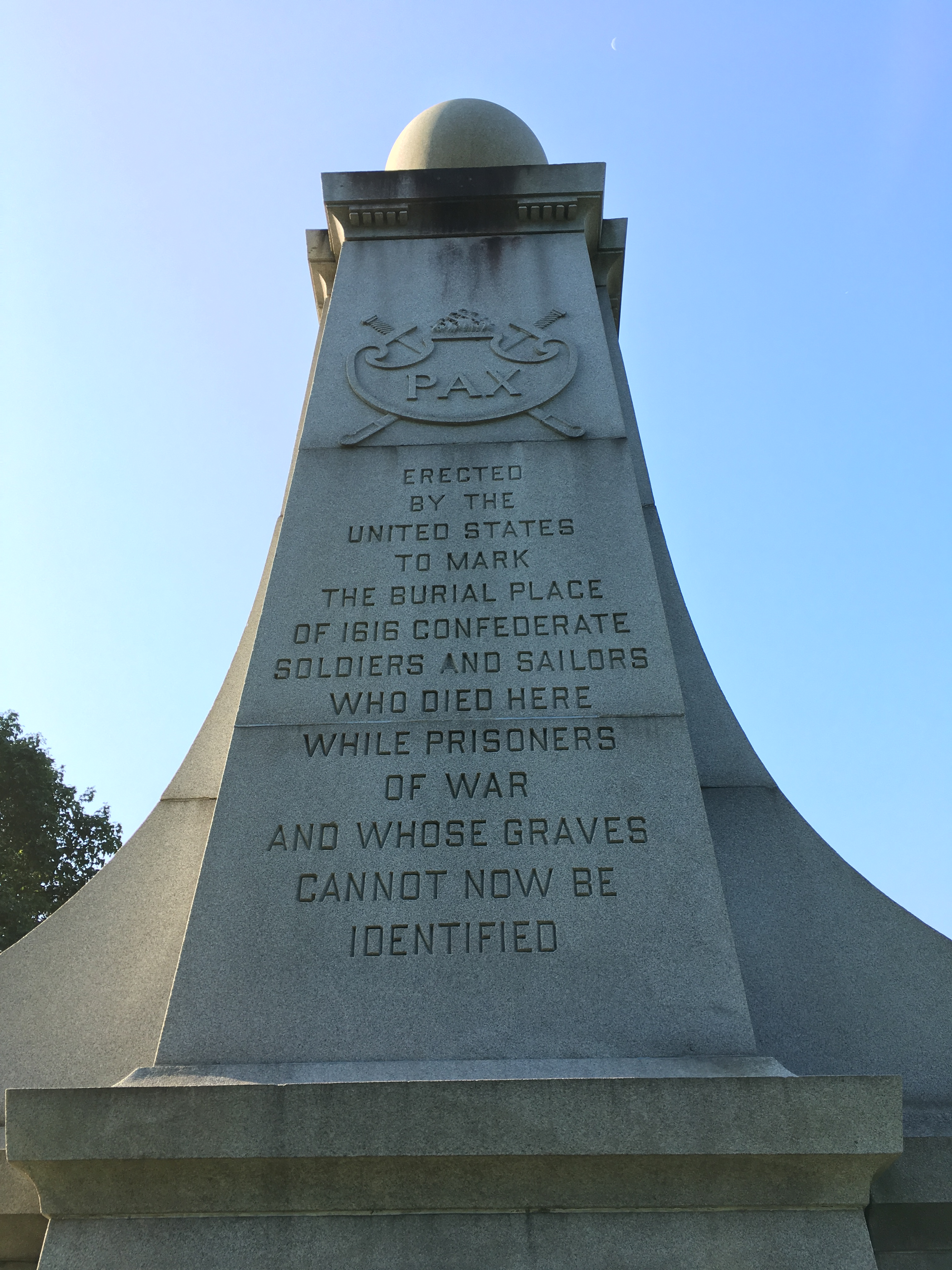
Inscription

Shortly after the start of the Civil War, the original Indiana State Fairgrounds site in present-day Herron–Morton Place Historic District was converted into a Union mustering ground and training camp known as Camp Morton. In 1862, the U.S. government assumed control of the camp and established a prison camp for Confederate soldiers. It quickly became one of the largest prison camps in operation; at its height in 1864, it housed nearly 5,000 prisoners. Due to poor conditions—which included overcrowding, lack of sanitation, malnutrition, disease, and lack of medical care—the mortality rate was high. By the end of the war, more than 1,700 prisoners had died at Camp Morton.

== Description ==
The monument was located within a circular walking path north of Pagoda Drive, just within Garfield Park's south road entrance on East Southern Avenue.

It was made of white granite, and measured 35–40 feet (11–12 m) tall and 20 feet (6.1 m) wide. On its north face, the granite shaft contained the following inscription: "ERECTED BY THE UNITED STATES TO MARK THE BURIAL PLACE OF 1616 CONFEDERATE SOLDIERS AND SAILORS WHO DIED HERE WHILE PRISONERS OF WAR AND WHOSE GRAVES CANNOT NOW BE IDENTIFIED". Six wide bronze plates along the north and south sides of the base listed the names and regiments of the dead.

== History ==
=== Origin and placement ===
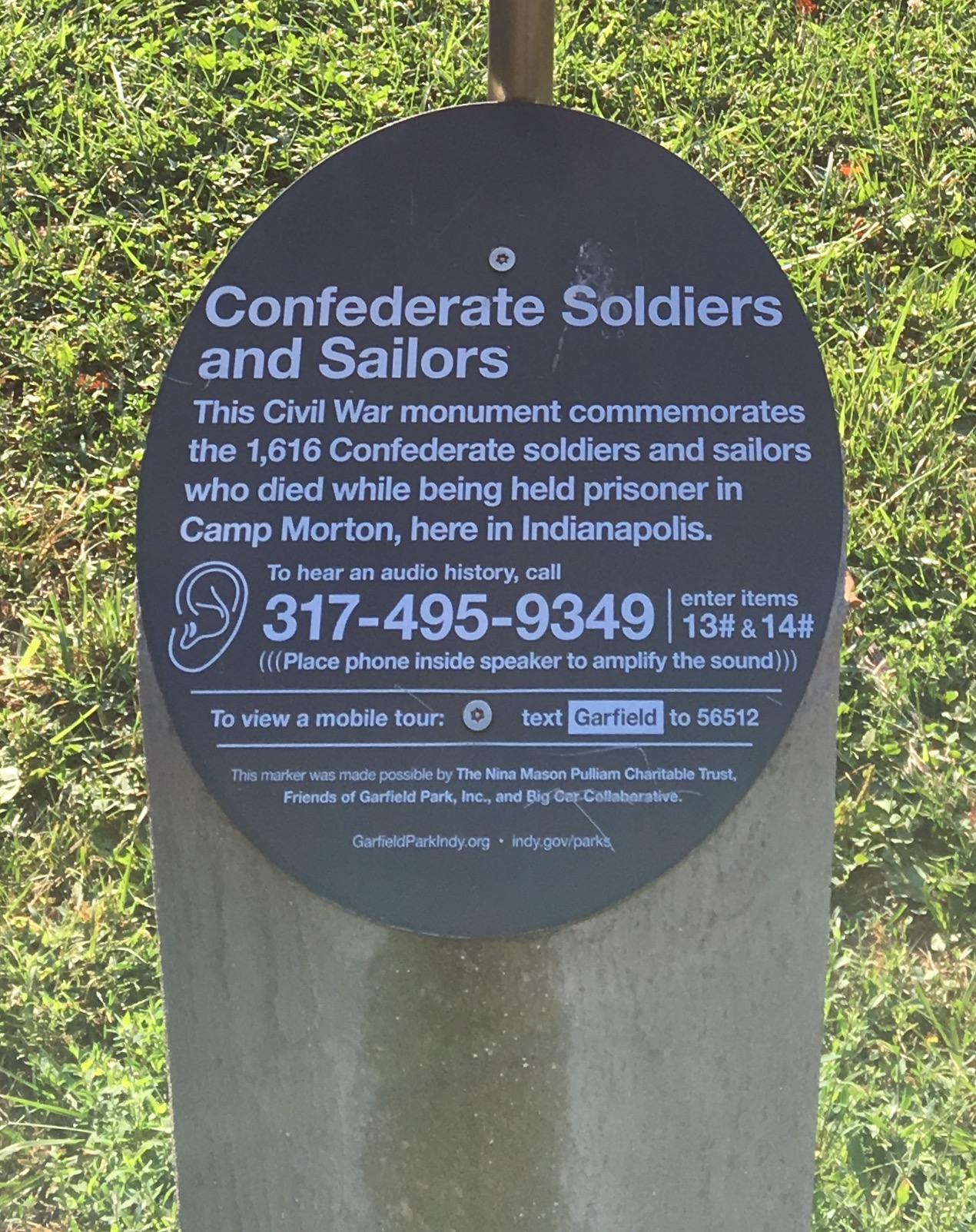
Modern tour marker

A small number of the Confederate dead from Camp Morton were identified and returned to their families after the war, but 1,616 soldiers were buried in a mass grave at Greenlawn Cemetery. In 1909, General William C. Oates, a one-armed confederate former congressman from Alabama, was commissioner in charge of identifying confederate soldiers who died in federal prison camps. A during a visit to Indianapolis in 1908 Gen. Oates spent time trying to identify specific graves, but was unsuccessful due to a fire that had destroyed the original records. Because of this, Oates recommended that a single shaft be erected bearing the names of the soldiers. In May 1909 Van Amringe Granite Company of Boston was awarded the commission to build the monument and the U.S. Congress allocated $6,000 for the work. In 1911, the Confederate Soldiers and Sailors Monument was dedicated at Greenlawn Cemetery during a Memorial Day service with around 300 people in attendance. In 1919, Indiana Senator Harry Elliott Negley proposed that the monument be moved from its unsightly location to that of a public park; possibly University or Military Park. Soon thereafter, The Southern Society, Governor Goodrich and J.H. Lowry (superintendent of Indianapolis parks) undertook review of the two proposed parks as well as Garfield Park. After investigation of the proposed sites, it was recommended that its new location should be Garfield Park. The monument was separated from the grave site and moved to a location near an entrance of Garfield Park; it was officially re-dedicated on Memorial Day in 1929. The Confederate dead were reinterred 1931 at a new plot known as the Confederate Mound in Crown Hill National Cemetery, with a small grave marker bearing no names. There was speculation that the monument may be moved again and re-erected in Crown Hill Cemetery, but no further action was taken.

=== Management ===
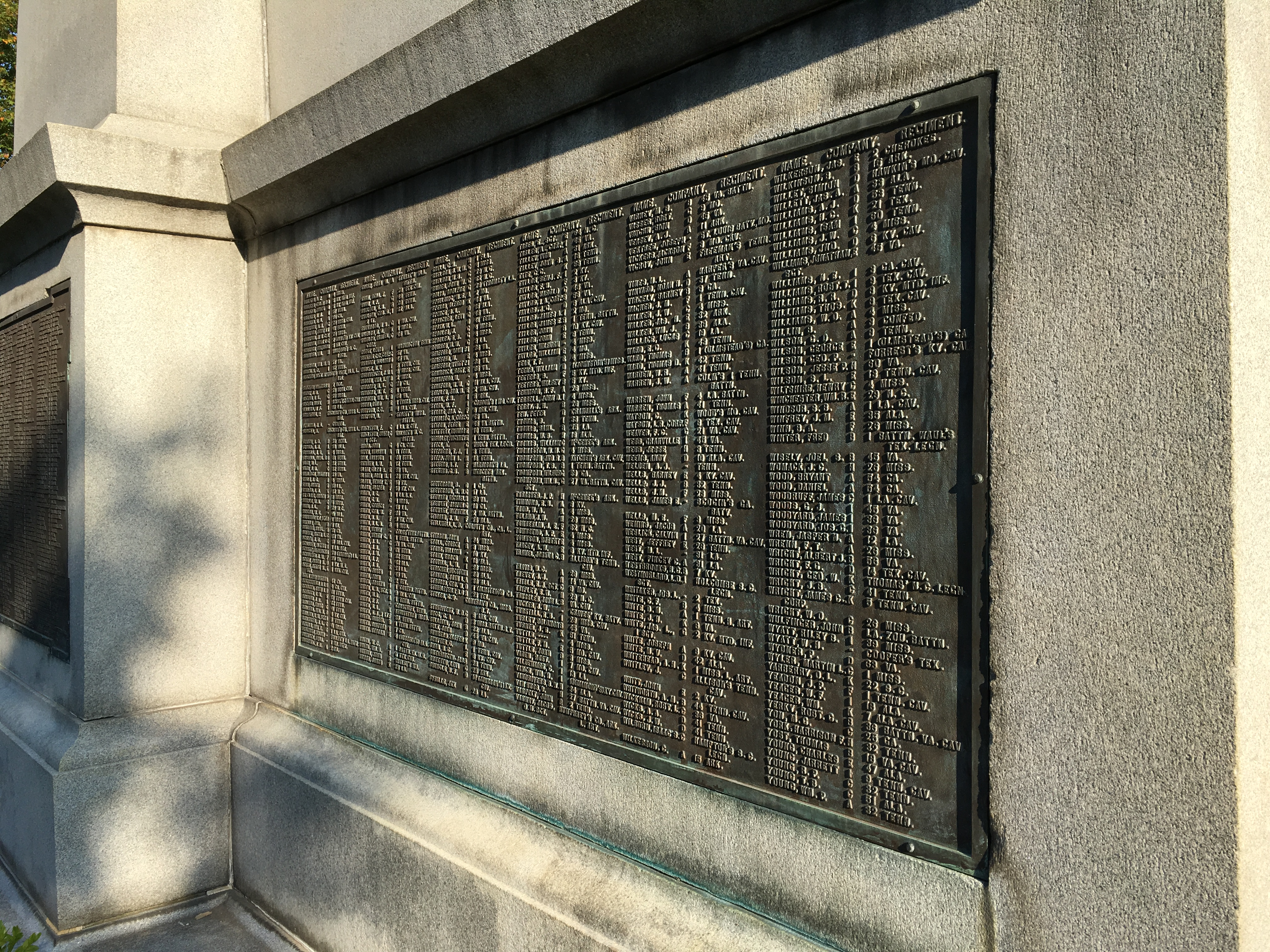
Plaque listing names

In the early 1990s, the local Sons of Confederate Veterans organization began lobbying federal officials to move the monument from Garfield Park to Crown Hill Cemetery to mark the actual Confederate grave site, which had no names listed. While ultimately unsuccessful in moving the monument, the effort resulted in a new memorial being installed in 1993 at Crown Hill's Confederate Mound that includes all of the soldier's names and regiments on 10 new markers with bronze plaques.

In 2014, the local Sons of Confederate Veterans organization partnered with Indy Parks and the Indy Parks Foundation on a plan to restore the monument, which had fallen into disrepair. While some members expressed dissatisfaction with the monument, the Indy Parks board ultimately voted unanimously for the proposal to allow SCV to raise funds for the project on behalf of the Indy Parks Foundation.

In 2015, the Friends of Garfield Park, with funding from the Nina Mason Pulliam Charitable Trust, launched a new audio tour throughout the park, which includes two soundbites discussing the monument. Vista markers shaped like phonograph speakers are at tour sites within the park, and one was placed northwest of the monument.

=== Controversy ===
In 2017, there was renewed public interest in the monument in the wake of the Charlottesville Unite the Right rally and the removal of Confederate monuments in other cities. On August 17, City-County Council President Maggie A. Lewis released a statement expressing a desire to start a conversation about the monument's location in Garfield Park. Monroe Gray, the council's Democratic majority leader, separately stated that he does not believe Garfield Park is an appropriate location, and noted that the monument "holds no historical significance to President Garfield," the park's namesake. Lewis and Mike McQuillen, Council's Republican minority leader, suggested an inventory of all public monuments in Marion County be conducted, so there can be a better understanding of their content, and whether they might cause offense. Following councilors' remarks, the city's Department of Parks and Recreation stated that the monument was "not in a location appropriate for its original purpose," and that it intended to work with the council and partners to "explore all available options to remove the monument from Garfield Park" so that it can be displayed in a setting that provides historical context.

On August 19, 2017, a man was reportedly arrested in the act of vandalizing the monument with a hammer. After the incident, the monument was put under watch by park rangers; it was also reported that a man armed with an AK-47 was guarding the monument, along with others. On August 21, the city added a fence around the monument. That same day, Maggie Lewis stated that there had been "productive discussions" about the monument's potential relocation, and she urged calm.

=== Removal ===
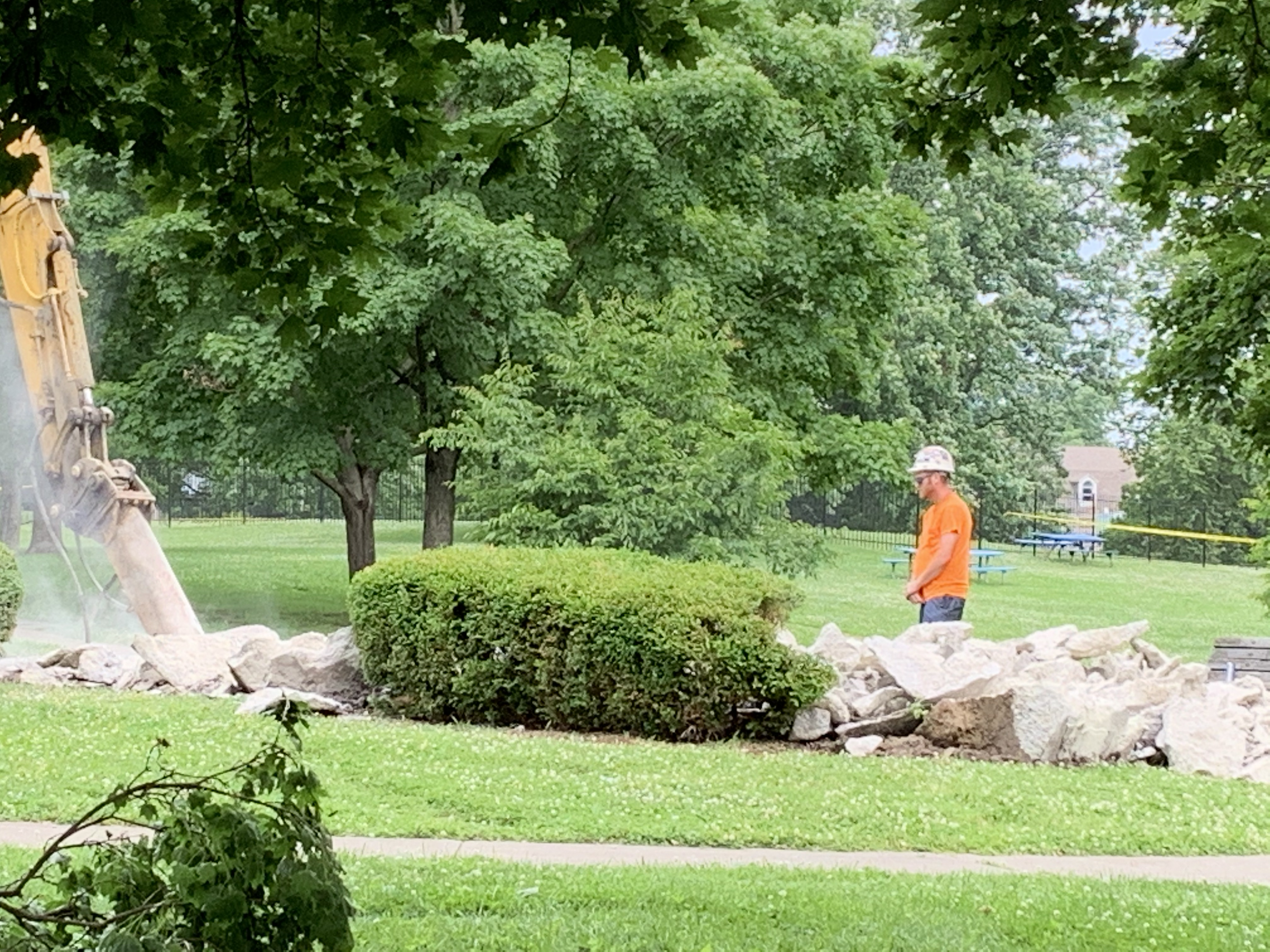
A construction crew uses a hydraulic jackhammer to break up the monument's base on June 9, 2020, one day after the main pieces were hauled off.

After 2017 public discussion around the monument, the Indy Parks and Recreation board passed a non-binding recommendation that the monument be removed, but the city never followed through on funding the proposed project or directing the monument's removal. The protective fencing was later removed. On June 4, 2020, after days of Black Lives Matter protests in Indianapolis and throughout the country after the murder of George Floyd, Mayor Joe Hogsett announced that the city was currently identifying the source of an estimated $50,000–$100,000 which would be required to dismantle the monument, which he said could happen within a week. In his statement, Hogsett said that the city believed the monument belonged in a museum instead of its location in the public park, but that no organization stepped up to assume responsibility, and so "time is up." The monument was dismantled and removed by city crews on the morning of June 8, 2020. This monument was commissioned in 1912 by Greenlawn Cemetery and memorializes Confederate soldiers who died at Camp Morton, a Union prison camp. Efforts by public officials active in the Ku Klux Klan in 1928 lead to the monument's relocation to Garfield Park to make it more visible. A resolution to remove the monument passed the Indianapolis Parks Board in 2017, but was not funded. Mayor Joe Hogsett announced the monument would be removed from the park.

== See also ==
- List of monuments and memorials removed during the George Floyd protests
