= George Floyd protests in Indiana =

Protests in Indiana caused by the murder of George Floyd

- Part of George Floyd protests
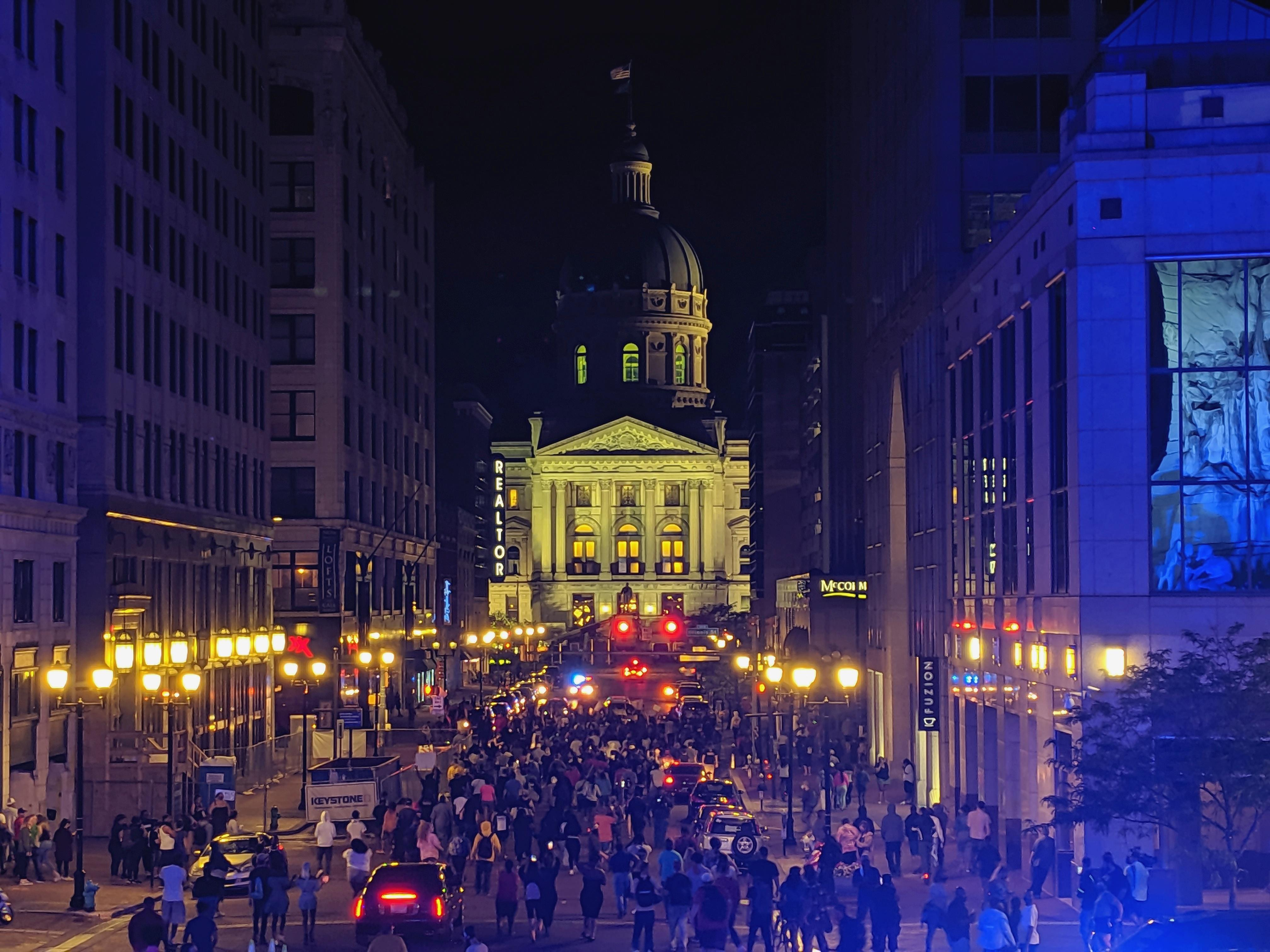
- Crowd of protesters in front of the Indiana Statehouse in Indianapolis on May 29
- Date: May 28 – July 2020 (1 month and 3 days)
- Location: Indiana, United States
- Caused by: Police brutality; Institutional racism against African Americans; Reaction to the murder of George Floyd; Economic, racial and social inequality

Cities in Indiana in which a protest with about 100 or more participants was held

This is a list of George Floyd protests in Indiana, United States. As of July 2020, protests had occurred in at least 25 communities throughout the state.

== Locations ==
=== Anderson ===
More than 100 people attended a march through downtown and congregated at the Anderson Police Department headquarters on May 30. After midnight, a car window was broken and water bottles were thrown at police, but no injuries were reported.

=== Avon ===
Nearly 500 people gathered on June 11 for a peaceful protest organized by recent grads and current high school students outside Avon Town Hall. Roughly a dozen speakers spoke at the event.

=== Bedford ===
More than 100 protesters gathered at the Lawrence County Courthouse Square for a rally on June 7. Some passersby attempted to drown out the rally with music, but the gathering was peaceful.

=== Bloomington ===
Thousands attended a rally that began on the Indiana University campus and ended in downtown Bloomington on June 5. During a protest on July 6, a 66-year-old woman was arrested for driving a car into protesters, causing two injuries.

=== Bluffton ===
On June 6, a group of protesters demonstrated in support of Black Lives Matter in front of the Wells County Courthouse.

=== Brownsburg ===
Several hundred people gathered on June 11 for a peaceful protest that included a lineup of speakers on the lawn outside the Brownsburg town hall. The crowd was bigger than expected.

=== Carmel ===
Hundreds of protesters attended a peaceful march downtown on June 1. Hundreds attended a sit in and march at the gazebo hosted by Carmel Against Racial Injustice (CARI) on June 14. CARI also hosted a chalking event and march on July 11.

=== Columbus ===
A solidarity rally was held on June 4 with hundreds marching from the Bartholomew County Courthouse to Columbus City Hall.

=== Crawfordsville ===
More than 100 demonstrators met to protest racial injustice on June 6. The protesters performed a lie-in for eight minutes and 46 seconds before marching through downtown Crawfordsville. The gathering remained peaceful.

=== Crown Point ===
On June 1, about 40 protesters gathered at the city's square to support Black Lives Matter. As they marched north, they were met by a group of men carrying rifles. Crown Point police escorted the protesters back to the square.

=== Elkhart ===
On June 11, over 100 protesters sang the Michael Jackson song "Man in the Mirror" as they marched through downtown Elkhart to Civic Plaza to show solidarity with Black Lives Matter and George Floyd.

=== Evansville ===
On May 30, a rally being held downtown gathered a crowd of 300. The rally was mostly peaceful, but four protesters were arrested in the evening.

=== Fort Wayne ===
On May 29, hundreds gathered outside the Allen County Courthouse in a peaceful demonstration that turned violent after police fired off tear gas in response to protesters blocking traffic by sitting in the road at Clinton and Main Street, refusing to move. Some establishments were vandalized.

=== Gary ===
Around 200 demonstrators gathered outside city hall in June. The family of Rashad Cunningham, who was killed by Gary police in 2019, were in attendance.

=== Goshen ===
On May 31, demonstrators marched from the Elkhart County Courthouse down Main Street to honor George Floyd and David McAtee. No violence or injuries were reported.

=== Greenfield ===
About 200 people demonstrated in support of racial justice at the Hancock County courthouse on June 4. The group was met by a small group of counter-protesters, but the event remained peaceful.

=== Greenwood ===
A few hundred people came together at a park in Greenwood on Friday, June 12.

=== Hammond ===
Several hundred people attended a rally organized by "Black Lives Matter-Gary" outside the Hammond Police Station on May 30.

=== Indianapolis ===
Crowd of protesters chanting Breonna Taylor's name in front of the Indiana Statehouse in Indianapolis

On May 29, a protest began at Monument Circle to rally against the murder of George Floyd, as well as Dreasjon Reed, who had been killed by Indianapolis police earlier that month. The disorganized protest grew violent after dark, with some protesters breaking windows of businesses. The Key Bank at Market Tower was vandalized, fires were set in trash cans, and numerous stores were looted. Several officers were injured. Tear gas and rubber bullets were used to disperse crowds. Mayor Joe Hogsett condemned the riots while sympathizing with the anger that fueled it. During the night of May 30, three people were killed and two more injured in several shootings. On June 1, roughly 200 protesters marched to the Indiana Governor's Residence north of downtown Indianapolis, where, an hour after the city-mandated curfew, they were twice ordered to disperse and were faced with 50 police officers armed with zip ties, batons, and tear gas. However, one protester began peacefully conversing with officers, who then removed their riot gear and showed solidarity with the protesters, walking with them for one block and some sharing hugs with protesters. The event drew criticism from some protesters, with one tweeting, "We don't shake hands with the enemy."

On June 8, protesters at Monument Circle were struck by a minivan that drove into the crowd. Some protesters attacked the minivan, which drove away with some damage. At least four injuries were reported. The driver, 68-year-old Diane Goebel, was charged with criminal recklessness on June 12.

As of June 11, Indianapolis had seen 14 consecutive days of demonstrations. As of June 16, smaller daily protests were still occurring downtown.

=== Kokomo ===
A former correctional officer injured two people in a hit-and-run against a group of protesters on May 30. Protesters blocked streets on June 1 and demanded consequences for the driver, who was arrested and charged with three counts the next day.

=== Lafayette ===
Around 1,200 protested at a peaceful march on May 31. Despite a largely peaceful protest, minor vandalism occurred and tear gas and rubber bullets were fired without warning. Protests in following days were smaller and more unruly, with five arrests and significantly more police force being used.

=== Marion ===
Two high school students joined the national protest on Friday, May 29. By Saturday May 30, 40 other protesters had joined them. By Sunday, May 31 more than 100 protesters had gathered outside the courthouse.

=== Martinsville ===
Around 80 people met at the Morgan County courthouse square to protest in support of Black Lives Matter on June 7. The group was met by at least 30 counter-protesters, some of whom were armed.

=== Michigan City ===
Around 200 people congregated for a planned protest on May 31. Participants marched to the city's police station, guided by a planned police presence. The protest was largely peaceful, though by nightfall, violence had broken out at Lighthouse Premium Outlet Mall. Windows at the mall were broken, and reports were made of bottles being thrown at police. The chief of police and mayor both acknowledged the demonstrators who protested in peace.

=== Mishawaka ===
Around 30 people protested at the Main Street bridge on July 4. A car drove through the protesters, dragging one of them 50 feet.

=== Mooresville ===
More than 100 protesters met for a March on the Suburbs event on July 3 and were met by a group of counter-protesters, some of whom were armed.

=== Muncie ===
Thousands marched from the Ball State University campus to Muncie City Hall on June 4, forming one of the largest protests in city history.

=== New Albany ===
On June 13, over 300 protesters marched to the City-County building in New Albany. Protesters knelt or laid down for 8'45". Notable attendees included local clergy, the chief of police and the mayor.

=== Plainfield ===
About 100 people met for a March on the Suburbs event at town hall on July 4 and were met by a group of counter-protesters wielding at least two long rifles.

=== Peru ===
On June 6, roughly 300 Black Lives Matter protesters marched from Peru High School to the Miami County Courthouse in Peru.

=== Richmond ===
Hundreds gathered for a rally and march through downtown Richmond on May 31. Organizers spoke about experiences with policing and the protest remained peaceful.

=== South Bend ===
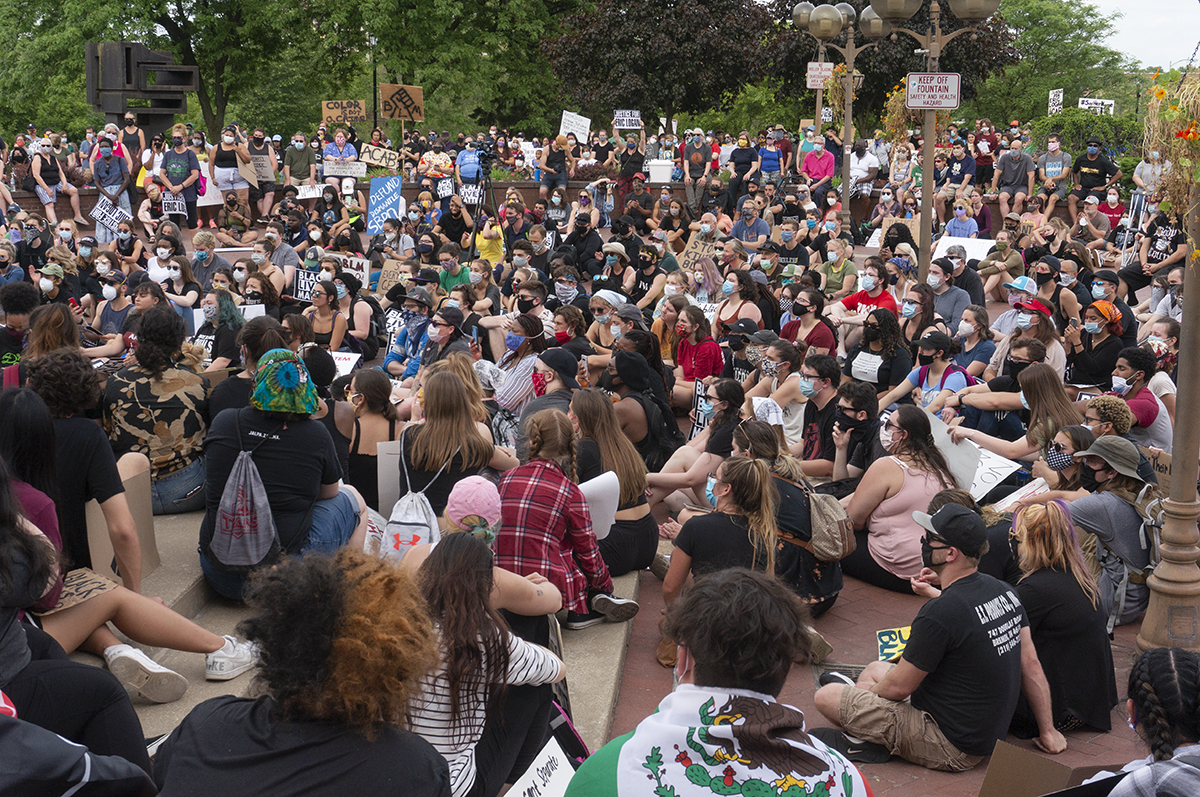
Crowd of protesters in South Bend

Hundreds protested at two peaceful marches downtown on May 30. Police barriers were broken and insults were hurled at police, but the marches were otherwise peaceful. Ideas for change were discussed.

=== Shelbyville ===
On June 6, a crowd of around 100 people gathered in front of and marched from the Shelby County courthouse and down State Road 44, eventually returning to the courthouse. Organizers and community members spoke about their experiences with policing and the justice system. The protest remained largely peaceful.

=== Terre Haute ===
A crowd of more than 100 marched from the Vigo County courthouse to the Terre Haute police department on June 6. The protest, like others that had occurred that week, remained peaceful.

=== Warsaw ===
Hundreds gathered on June 4 for a peaceful demonstration at the Kosciusko County Courthouse.
