= Bloomberg Center for Cities at Harvard University =

Research center located at Harvard University

The Bloomberg Center for Cities at Harvard University is a multidisciplinary research center in Cambridge, Massachusetts. Founded in 2021, the Bloomberg Center for Cities serves a global community committed to improving public management, leadership, and governance in cities.

The center unites expertise across disciplines and schools at Harvard to produce research, train current and future leaders, and develop resources for global use. Its mission is to convene, inform, inspire, and support city leaders, scholars, students, and others who work to improve the lives of city residents around the world. The Bloomberg Center for Cities at Harvard University is an interfaculty initiative by Harvard University.

== History ==
The center was founded in 2021 with Bloomberg Philanthropies, the philanthropic organization that encompasses the charitable giving of founder Michael R. Bloomberg. The center hosted an opening celebration in April 2023.

The Bloomberg Center for Cities at Harvard University builds on the Bloomberg Harvard City Leadership Initiative, which was launched in 2017 as a collaboration among Harvard Kennedy School, Harvard Business School, and Bloomberg Philanthropies to equip mayors and senior city officials to tackle complex challenges in their cities.

== Programs and Faculty ==
The center's inaugural director is Dr. Jorrit de Jong, Emma Bloomberg Senior Lecturer in Public Policy and Management, Harvard Kennedy School, who has also served as the Faculty Co-chair of the Bloomberg Harvard City Leadership Initiative since its inception. The executive director of the center is David L. Margalit.

More than 50 Harvard faculty are affiliated with the center. Their scholarship spans a range of disciplines, and they hold appointments at numerous Harvard graduate and professional schools, including:

- Harvard Faculty of Arts and Sciences
- Harvard Business School
- Harvard Graduate School of Design
- Harvard Graduate School of Education
- Harvard John A. Paulson School of Engineering and Applied Sciences
- Harvard Kennedy School
- Harvard Law School
- Harvard Medical School
- Harvard T.H. Chan School of Public Health

The center houses several faculty-led labs and programs. As of January 2024, they include the Bloomberg Harvard City Leadership Initiative, the Civic Power Lab, Data-Smart City Solutions, the Equity and Just Outcomes Hub, and The People Lab.

Academic activities at the center include:

- Multidisciplinary research on public management, leadership, and governance
- Executive education for (aspiring) city leaders
- Development of learning tools and resources, including freely accessible resources produced by the Bloomberg Harvard City Leadership Initiative
- Experiential learning opportunities for students
- Convenings to exchange knowledge between scholars, students, and practitioners

== Residential Faculty ==
- Jorrit de Jong, Director, Bloomberg Center for Cities at Harvard University, Faculty Co-chair, Bloomberg Harvard City Leadership Initiative, Emma Bloomberg Senior Lecturer in Public Policy and Management, Harvard Kennedy School
- Rawi Abdelal, Herbert F. Johnson Professor of International Management, Harvard Business School, Emma Bloomberg Co-chair of the Bloomberg Harvard City Leadership Initiative
- Anthony Foxx, Emma Bloomberg Professor of the Practice of Public Leadership
- Stephen Goldsmith, Derek Bok Professor of the Practice of the Urban Policy, Harvard Kennedy School, and the Director of the Data-Smart City Solutions program at the Bloomberg Center for Cities at Harvard University
- Kimberlyn Leary, Senior Fellow, Bloomberg Center for Cities at Harvard University, Associate Professor of Psychology, Harvard Medical School, Associate Professor in the Department of Health Policy and Management, Harvard T.H. Chan School of Public Health
- Matthew Lee, Associate Professor of Public Policy and Management, Harvard Kennedy School
- Elizabeth Linos, Emma Bloomberg Associate Professor for Public Policy and Management, Harvard Kennedy School, Faculty Director of The People Lab
- Liz McKenna, Assistant Professor of Public Policy, Harvard Kennedy School, Faculty Director of the Civic Power Lab

The Bloomberg Center for Cities is located at the Harvard Kennedy School at Harvard University.
