= Paul Cantwell =

American politician (1927–1997)

Member of the Indiana House of Representatives from the 97th district
- In office 1992 – 1994
- Succeeded by: Irene Heffley

Member of the Indianapolis City-County Council from District 23
- In office 1971–1979
- Preceded by: council newly-established
- Succeeded by: Stanley P. Strader

Member of the Marion County Board
- In office 1966–1971
- Succeeded by: council disestablished

Personal details
- Born: September 15, 1927 Indiana
- Died: June 30, 1997 (aged 69)
- Party: Democratic
- Children: 5 (including Maria)
- Occupation: Masonry contractor; politician

Military service
- Allegiance: United States
- Branch/service: United States Navy
- Years of service: 1945–1946

Paul Francis Cantwell (September 15, 1927 – June 30, 1997) was an American politician, active in Indianapolis, who served as a Democratic member of the Indiana House of Representatives the Indianapolis City-County Council, and the Marion County Board. He was his party's nominee in the 1979 Indianapolis mayoral election.

== Early life, education, and career ==
Cantwell was born September 15, 1927, and grew up in the Indianapolis-area suburb of Beech Grove, Indiana. His mother was active in Indianapolis politics. Cantwell himself began working in politics as a political volunteer at the age of fifteen, beginning by organizing at the precinct-level. He graduated high school in 1945 at Cathedral High School. After graduating high school, he enlisted in the United States Navy, serving on a tanker in the China Sea during World War II. After being discharged, he returned to Indianapolis and took classes at Butler University, Indiana University–Purdue University Indianapolis, and the University of Indianapolis. He worked jobs in the petroleum and construction industries while a student, and ultimately did not complete his degree. He began his professional career as a masonry contractor, and became an advocate for trade unions.

In 1965, Cantwell was hired to work as an administrative assistant for Congressman Andrew Jacobs Jr. in Washington, D.C. He held this job for a year, before returning to Indianapolis and beginning his own political career.

== Marion County Commissioner (1966–1971) ==
In 1966, Cantwell won election as a Marion County Commissioner. During part of his tenure as a commissioner, he was the president of the Marion County Board of Commissioners. During part of his tenure on the board, he also served on the Metropolitan Thoroughfare Commission and as president of the Marion County Drainage Board. Cantwell was a vocal supporter of James W. Beatty's Democratic primary challenge to incumbent Indianapolis mayor John J. Barton in the 1967 Indianapolis mayoral election. Cantwell was standing alongside Robert F. Kennedy when Kennedy gave his 1968 speech on the assassination of Martin Luther King Jr.

The county commission was a three-member body. In the 1960s, Candwell and fellow Democrat Birney Weber together gave the council a Democratic majority, which had been rare in its history. While they were of the same party, however, Cantwell and Weber were not united in their positions on a number of local matters. Cantwell served on the county commission until it was abolished in the city-county consolidation that replaced the previously separate Marion County and Indianapolis governments with the Unigov.

Cantwell supported the expansion Indianapolis Public Library into a countywide system. In 1970, he filed a lawsuit seeking to give the City of Indianapolis government a greater level of control over the Citizens Gas & Coke utility company.

== Indianapolis City-County Council (1971–1979) ==
Cantwell began serving on the newly created Indianapolis City-County Council after the city-county consolidation that established the Unigov in 1970. He was elected to the 23rd district seat on new council in the 1971 election. His district represented areas around the southeast side's Garfield Park neighborhood. He was re-elected in 1975 for a second 4-year term. The creation of the Unigov had essentially ensured that Republicans would have majority control over the Indianapolis government. In the 1971 election, Cantwell was one of only one of eight Democrats elected to the 29-member council. For the duration of his eight years on the City–County Council, Cantwell led its minuscule Democratic caucus, serving as the council's minority leader.

On the council, Cantwell was a fierce critic of the city's Republican leadership. He believed that criticism was a means of pressuring better governance. On the council, Cantwell garnered significant local attention for being a frequent critic in opposition to Republican-led budget plans. He was often the chief critic in government, and on some matters was even the only council member to raise criticism. He led opposition against several bond issues, asserting a belief that the City of Indianapolis was too highly indebted to afford issuing more bonds. He would often arouse public controversy in an effort to draw attention and scrutiny towards Republican budget decisions. He managed to defeat some bonds, with Mayor William H. Hudnut III being successfully pressured to scale-back a number of requests for bond-issues to fund parks, sanitation, and transportation projects.

Cantwell was involved in council efforts which established the Indiana Housing Authority to oversee the city's public housing.

In 1975, Cantwell was one of the plaintiffs in a lawsuit arguing that the legislation creating Unigov denied certain voters the equal protection guaranteed in the Fourteenth Amendment to the United States Constitution. The lawsuit, in part, argued that this right was violated by the fact that the Unigov legislation allowed four city-county councilmen elected at-large from the entire Unigov to sit on councils for special police and fire department districts which only served part of the Unigov area. The lawsuit sought to have the four at-large council members barred from these boards, which would have had the consequence, with the composition of the council in 1975, of giving Democrats control of these boards. The lawsuit was unsuccessful, with the plaintiffs losing the case in the United States Court of Appeals for the Seventh Circuit.

== 1979 mayoral campaign ==
In 1979, Cantwell ran as the Democratic nominee in the 1979 Indianapolis mayoral election. Statutes prevented Cantwell from seeking re-election to the council while running for mayor. He opted to resign early from the city council in order to focus on his campaign. The city's Democratic party was poorly-organized, and Cantwell received no organizational support from it. Consequently, his campaign was a grassroots and independent operation.

Cantwell lost to Hudnut, the incumbent Republican mayor, in what was reported to have been the greatest margin of defeat for a Democratic candidate in an Indianapolis mayoral election in 150 years. During the campaign, Cantwell struggled to raise funds, while Hudnut was able to spend a considerable amount on his own campaign. Additionally at the time of the election, Cantwell's son Danny was awaiting trial for murder. Cantwell argued that the charges were political, and were retribution for his investigations of police corruption. Danny Cantrell would later be acquitted in 1980. In the conceding council election, Cantwell's former seat was won by Republican nominee Stanley P. Strader.

== Indiana House (1992–94) ==
In 1992, Cantwell was elected to the Indiana House of Representatives district 97, representing portions of the Southside of Indianapolis. He defeated Robert L. Murley in the Democratic primary, capturing more than 70% of the vote. He won the general election by a narrow 250-vote margin over Republican nominee Irene Heffley, a real estate broker. This close race came despite the seat had originally been expected to be a "safe Democratic" seat. On the same night he won this election, his daughter Maria, by then already a member of the Washington House of Representatives, won election to the United States House of Representatives.

Cantwell was an opponent of the construction of the Victory Field baseball stadium in Indianapolis, strongly preferring to see the continued use of the existing Bush Stadium.

In 1994, Cantwell lost reelection in a rematch against Heffley, being defeated 4,782 votes to 4,037 votes in the wave election year of the "Republican Revolution".

== Personal life ==
Cantwell and his wife had five children together, including their daughter Maria who was elected to the United States Senate from Washington. The Cantwells had divorced by the time he ran for mayor.

In his political career, Cantwell locally earned the nickname "Mr. Democrat".

On June 30, 1997, Cantwell died of laryngeal cancer at the age of 69.
