= 1995 Indianapolis mayoral election =

- November 7, 1995
- Turnout: 26.51% ▼21.33pp
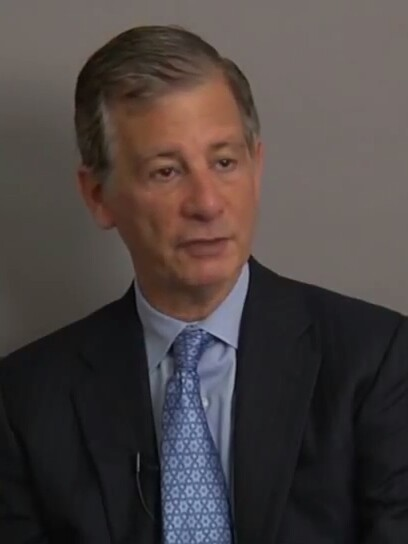

Nominee	Stephen Goldsmith	Z. Mae Jimison	Steve Dillon
Party	Republican	Democratic	Libertarian
Popular vote	64,209	39,539	7,175
Percentage	57.89%	35.65%	6.47%
Mayor before election
Stephen Goldsmith
Republican
Elected mayor
Stephen Goldsmith
Republican

The Indianapolis mayoral election of 1995 took place on November 7, 1995. Incumbent Republican mayor Stephen Goldsmith was easily reelected to a second term. His Democratic opponent, Zilthia Mae Jimison, was the first African-American nominated for mayor of Indianapolis by a major political party.

Goldsmith would run unsuccessfully for governor in 1996, narrowly losing to Democrat Frank O’Bannon.

== Election results ==
Indianapolis mayoral election, 1995
Party	Candidate	Votes	%
Republican	Stephen Goldsmith (incumbent)	64,209	57.89
Democratic	Z. Mae Jimison	39,539	35.65
Libertarian	Steve Dillon	7,175	6.47
Total votes		110,923	100
Majority		24,670	22.24
Republican hold			

Preceded by 1991	Indianapolis mayoral election 1995	Succeeded by 1999
