= Marie Hammontree =

American author (1913–2012)

Marie Gertrude Hammontree (June 19, 1913 – December 7, 2012) was an American children's book author known for her biographies of famous people. Her works include Albert Einstein, Young Thinker and Walt Disney, Young Movie Maker.

== Life and career ==
Hammontree was born in Jefferson County, Indiana to Harry Clay and Hatie Agnes Hamontree. She and her family eventually moved to Indianapolis where she graduated from Arsenal Technical High School in 1929. She enrolled at Butler University and attended classes for three years but for financial reasons, she had to leave the university.

She worked as an office secretary before joining the Bobbs-Merrill Publishing Company as a stenographer and then as a secretary in the publicity department. When World War II started, she found work as a censor and later as a surgical stenographer at Indiana University Medical Center.

In 1948 she returned to Butler University to complete the degree requirements in English in 1949. She took a brief job at a New York City publishing house but after only one year she was forced to return to Indianapolis to help care for her mother. In 1950 she found a job working as a stenographer for the Federal Bureau of Investigation in Indianapolis and she was promoted throughout the next seven years until she was secretary to the agent in charge of the Indianapolis office.

Even as she worked for the FBI in 1952, Hammontree began writing children's books with biographies of famous people. Her first book, published by Bobbs–Merrill, was about William James Mayo and Charles Horace Mayo, the brothers who co-founded the Mayo Clinic. Other biographies included A. P. Giannini, founder of Bank of America, Mahatma Gandhi, Albert Einstein and Walt Disney. Hammontree retired from the F.B.I. in 1975 and worked part-time for Indianapolis mayor Bill Hudnut and the Republican Party until 1992.

In 1988, she moved to Marquette Manor, an assisted living facility in Indianapolis where she lived for many years. She continued to update her published works. She was also a supporter of the Republican Party, and wrote articles for the facility newsletter called the Marquette Mirror. She died at 99 on December 7, 2012.

== Archives ==
Four boxes of Hammontree's papers can be found at the William Henry Smith Memorial Library of the Indiana Historical Society in Indianapolis. The collection includes the author's correspondence, writings and other materials concerning her career as a children's book biographer from 1952 to 1997.
