= Baltimore Colts relocation to Indianapolis =

NFL franchise relocation

The Colts moved from Baltimore to Indianapolis after the 1983 NFL season.

On the night of March 28–29, 1984, Robert Irsay, then-owner of the Baltimore Colts of the National Football League (NFL) covertly moved the team to Indianapolis, Indiana, where it would begin play as the Indianapolis Colts in the 1984 NFL season.

The city government of Baltimore, Maryland, had proved unwilling to replace the team's three-decade-old home stadium, and the Maryland General Assembly was on the verge of passing legislation allowing the city to seize the team via eminent domain. The move embittered many Baltimoreans for decades. Its effects on the NFL include a similar controversy that 12 years later brought Baltimore its current franchise, the Ravens.

== Actions leading up to the move ==
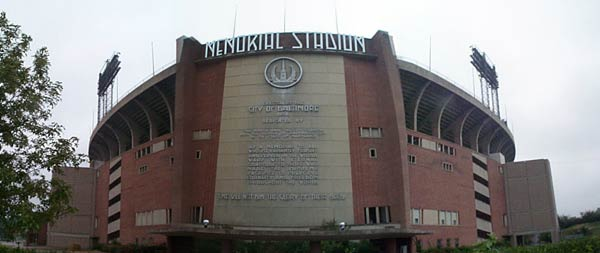
The Colts had played at Memorial Stadium since 1953

The Colts had played at Baltimore Memorial Stadium since the 1953 NFL season, sharing the facility with Major League Baseball's Baltimore Orioles. In May 1969, the city of Baltimore announced it would seek a substantial increase in Memorial Stadium rental fees from Colts owner Carroll Rosenbloom and the team itself. Rosenbloom had already called the stadium "antiquated" and had threatened to stop playing there unless improvements were made. Rosenbloom even considered using $12 million to $20 million of his own money to help fund the building of a new football-only stadium on land in adjoining Baltimore County. In November 1971, Rosenbloom announced that the Colts would not return to Memorial Stadium when their lease ran out after the 1972 season and that he was no longer interested in negotiating with the city. He wanted out of Baltimore for several reasons: team revenue, disputes with Baltimore Orioles owners over stadium revenue, a running feud with the Baltimore press, and his new wife's desire to move to the West Coast. After the 1971 season, Rosenbloom and Irsay swapped teams, the former taking ownership of the Los Angeles Rams and the latter the Colts.

In 1971, Baltimore mayor William Donald Schaefer and Maryland governor Marvin Mandel created a committee to examine the city's stadium needs. Their report was a blow to Memorial Stadium. Some of the problems mentioned: 10,000 of the stadium's seats had poor views of the field; 20,000 seats were outdated bench seats without back support; 7,000 seats were poorly constructed temporary bleachers that were installed for football games only. There was not enough office space for the front offices of either the Orioles or Colts, much less both teams combined. The teams had to share locker rooms. The upper deck of Memorial Stadium did not circle the field, ending instead at the 50-yard line. Any expansion plans for the stadium had usually mentioned less attractive (and less expensive) end-zone seats, not upper-deck seating. Even the bathroom facilities were deemed inadequate.

=== Baltodome project ===
Maryland's planners proposed the Baltodome, a facility near the city's Inner Harbor known as Camden Yards. The new stadium would host 70,000 fans for football games, 55,000 for baseball, and 20,000 as an arena for hockey or basketball. For an estimated $78 million, the city would build a facility that would have kept all parties happy: Baltimore Mayor Schaefer, Governor Mandel, Orioles owner Jerold Hoffberger, Colts owner Irsay, and the Stadium Complex Authority, whose chairman, Edmond Rovner, said in 1972, "A major consideration in Mr. Irsay's trading of franchises was the city's firm commitment to proceed with these plans".

However, the proposal did not receive support to pass the Maryland legislature, in spite of assurances that contributions from taxpayers would be limited strictly to city and state loans. On February 27, 1974, Mandel pulled the plug on the idea. Hoffberger was blunt: "I will bow to the will of the people. They have told us what they want to tell us. First, they don't want a new park and second, they don't want a club." Irsay was willing to wait. "It's not a matter of saying that there will be no stadium. It's a matter of getting the facts together so everybody is happy when they build the stadium. I'm a patient man. I think the people of Baltimore are going to see those new stadiums in New Orleans and Seattle opening in a year or two around the country, and they are going to realize they need a stadium...for conventions and other things besides football."

Hyman Pressman, Baltimore's comptroller, was against using any public funds to build a new stadium. During the 1974 elections, Pressman had an amendment to the city's charter placed on the fall ballot. Known as Question P, the amendment called for declaring "the 33rd Street stadium as a memorial to war veterans and prohibiting use of city funds for construction of any other stadium." The measure passed 56 percent to 44 percent, and the same political motivations that had been used to upgrade Baltimore Stadium, originally built in 1922, in the late 1940s and rename it Memorial Stadium, effectively destroyed any chance of a new, modern sports complex being built in Baltimore.

=== 1975–1980 ===
Although the Colts made the playoffs for three straight years from 1975 to 1977, there had still been no progress made on a new park for the team. Robert Irsay first spoke with Phoenix, Arizona, in 1976 and then Indianapolis, Indiana, in 1977 about the possibility of moving his team to one of those cities. In 1976, he acknowledged publicly that he had received an attractive offer to move the franchise to Phoenix. Then, in 1977, he said, "I like Baltimore and want to stay there, but when are we going to find out something about our stadium? I'm getting offers from towns like Indianapolis to build me a new stadium and give me other inducements to move there. I don't want to but I'd like to see some action in Baltimore." In 1979, Hoffberger sold the Orioles to Washington, D.C. attorney Edward Bennett Williams, who declared 1980 to be a trial year for the fans of Baltimore. He then went on to explain his concerns with Memorial Stadium, saying it had "inadequate parking and inadequate access and egress. Frankly, I don't know if those problems will ever be solvable at that location."

Irsay began shopping the Colts around in earnest, talking first to officials from the Los Angeles Memorial Coliseum Commission, Memphis, Tennessee, and Jacksonville, Florida, where he visited the Gator Bowl packed with 50,000 cheering fans trying to convince him that Jacksonville would be the best home for the Colts. That same year Irsay presented Maryland Governor Harry Hughes with a request for $25 million in renovation to the 64,124 seat Memorial Stadium. Irsay's request for $25 million in improvements was decreased to $23 million by the Maryland legislature. The plan added more seats (but none of the revenue-generating skyboxes), improved the plumbing, and gave both teams better office space. The plan's approval was contingent on both the Colts and Baltimore Orioles signing long-term leases. The Orioles challenged the requested football improvements and refused to sign anything more than a one-year lease. Irsay also refused to sign long term. As a result, the funds and improvements never came.

== Move to Indianapolis ==
In the middle 1970s when the NFL was planning its expansion from 26 to 28 teams — an agreed part of the NFL/AFL merger — Indianapolis was one of ten cities considered. It was considered a strong candidate because it was located at the junction of more major highways than any other city and had a large population in both the metropolis and surrounding rural areas. However, when the final decision was made in 1974, Indianapolis was rejected because, as Dan Rooney of the Rooney family, who owned the Pittsburgh Steelers, emphasized, "We had no choice [but to remove Indianapolis from the list of expansion candidates]. Indianapolis had no suitable stadium."

"I have not any intentions of moving the goddamn team. If I did, I will tell you about it, but I'm staying here."

— Robert Irsay, January 20, 1984

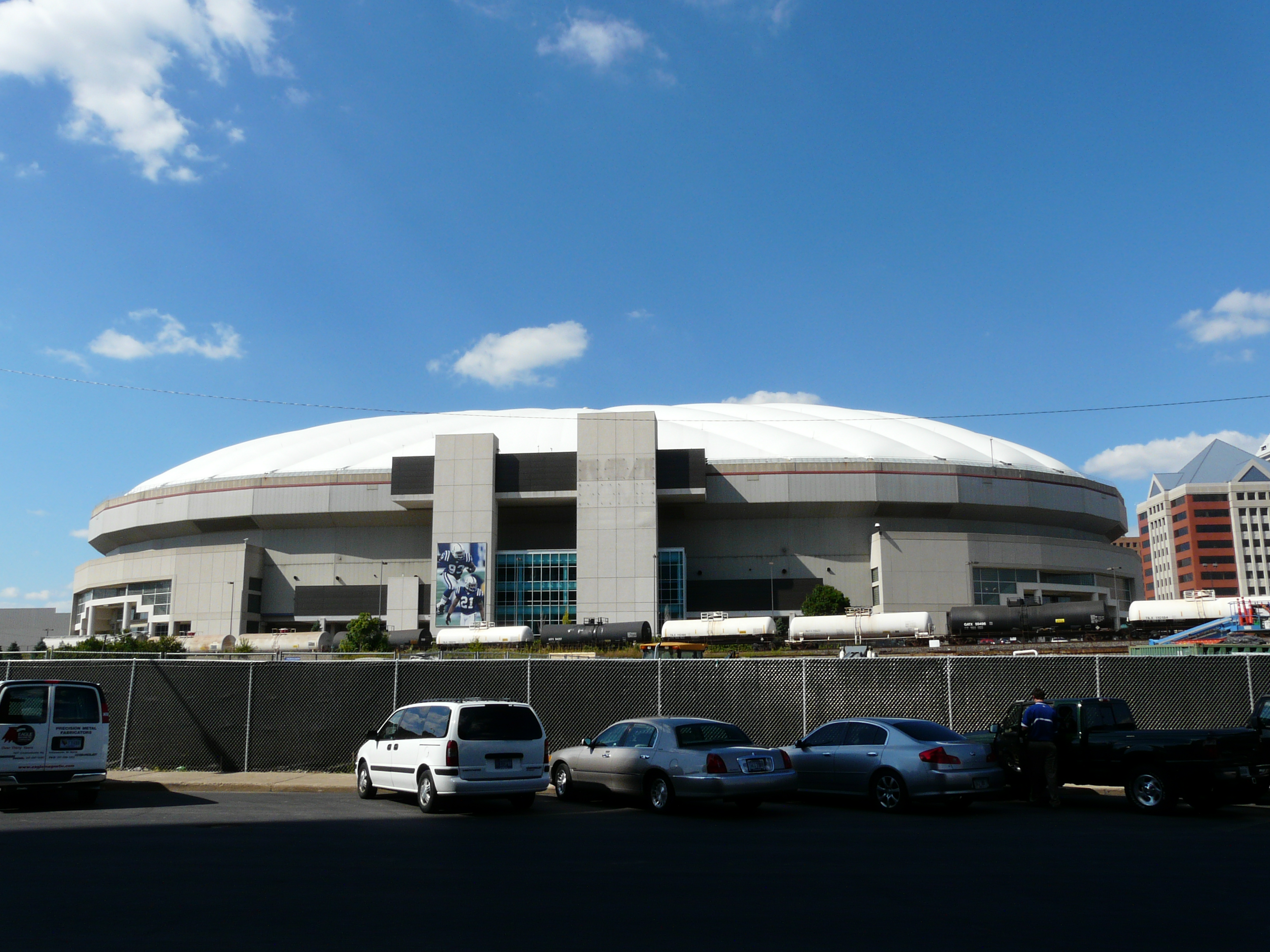
The Hoosier Dome was constructed with a view to attract an NFL franchise to Indianapolis

Under the administration of Mayor Richard Lugar and then continuing with successor, William Hudnut, the city of Indianapolis was making a serious effort to reinvent itself into a "Great American City." From the early 1970s through the 1980s, Indianapolis businessman and civic leader Robert V. Welch was instrumental in leading the way to build consensus among NFL hierarchy and Indianapolis community leaders that Indianapolis could support an NFL franchise. As a result of this and many other initiatives, Indianapolis community leaders created the Indiana Sports Corporation in 1979 to attract major sports events to central Indiana. With respect to the NFL, Welch spent more than a decade to position Indianapolis as the NFL's leading choice for franchise expansion with Welch as the local owner and as such, Hudnut appointed a committee in 1980 to study the feasibility of building a new stadium that could serve primarily as a boon to the city's convention business and, secondarily, as a lure for an NFL team.

=== Construction of the Hoosier Dome begins ===
In 1982, construction of the Hoosier Dome (later renamed the RCA Dome) began. Deputy Mayor David Frick, who later led the negotiations with the Colts and then went on to become chairman of the Indiana state commission that oversaw construction of the RCA Dome's replacement, Lucas Oil Stadium, later said that the RCA Dome was a key to changing the city's image. "Sports was an element in our game plan to change the image of the city back in the late 1970s, early 1980s."

Baltimore reportedly did offer Irsay a $15 million loan at 6.5%, a guarantee of at least 43,000 tickets sold per game for six years, and the purchase of the team's Owings Mills training facility for $4 million.

=== Negotiations with Phoenix and Indianapolis ===
On March 2, 1984, NFL owners voted to give Irsay permission to move his franchise to the city of his choosing. Irsay continued discussions with several cities hungry for an NFL franchise including Phoenix, Indianapolis, Jacksonville, Memphis, and Birmingham. Even New York City made overtures to Irsay, because while it had two NFL teams nominally representing it, both no longer played in the city or state of New York after the Jets had left Shea Stadium to join the Giants in Giants Stadium in New Jersey. Eventually, Irsay narrowed the list of cities to two, Phoenix and Indianapolis. In January 1984, Baltimore mayor Schaefer stated, "We're not going to build a new stadium. We do not have the bonding capacity. We don't have the voters or taxpayers who can support a $60 million stadium. One-third of the people in Baltimore pay taxes. Unless private enterprise builds it, we won't build it."

The Phoenix Metropolitan Sports Foundation, headed by real estate developer Eddie Lynch, along with Arizona Governor Bruce Babbitt and other top Arizona officials, had secretly met with Irsay early in January 1984. Preliminary talks seemed promising. Phoenix was offering a below market rate $15 million loan and rent-free use of the 71,000–seat Sun Devil Stadium on the campus of Arizona State University. A second meeting was scheduled between Irsay and the Phoenix group. But when word of a second scheduled meeting leaked out and was reported by the media on the Friday before the Super Bowl, Irsay canceled.

In January 1984, NFL Commissioner Pete Rozelle announced that expansion had been put on hold. As a result of that announcement, Indiana Pacers' owner Herb Simon contacted Colts officials in order to take negotiations between the club and Indianapolis to the next level. Mayor Hudnut then assigned deputy mayor Frick to begin secret negotiations with Colts counsel Michael Chernoff. On February 13, Colts representatives came to town to look at the Hoosier Dome construction. Colts owner Robert Irsay visited on February 23. "He [Irsay] was visibly moved," former deputy mayor Dave Frick said commenting on Irsay's reaction to entering the brand new domed stadium. "Emotionally, he was making the move."

Meanwhile, in Annapolis, the Maryland General Assembly became involved in the dispute. On March 27, 1984, the Maryland Senate passed legislation giving the city of Baltimore the right to seize ownership of the Colts by eminent domain, an idea first floated in a memo written by Baltimore mayoral aide Mark Wasserman. Irsay said that his move to Indianapolis was "a direct result" of the eminent domain bill. Chernoff said of the move by the Maryland legislature: "They not only threw down the gauntlet, but they put a gun to his head and cocked it and asked, 'Want to see if it's loaded?' They forced him to make a decision that day."

=== March 29, 1984 ===
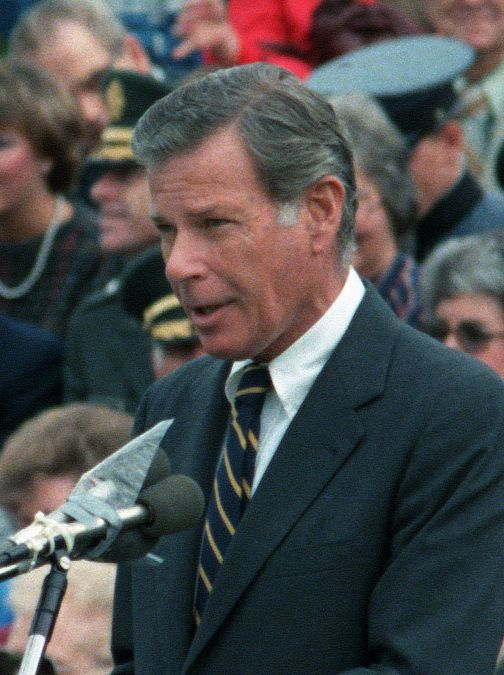
Although Maryland Governor Harry Hughes signed a bill allowing the city of Baltimore to seize the Colts by eminent domain, it was too late to prevent the organization from moving to Indianapolis.

It remains debatable as to the exact effect a state eminent domain law might have had on the NFL if Irsay had not taken immediate action. It is considered extremely unlikely that NFL owners would have favored a government owning or operating one of its franchises. However, the NFL was reluctant to engage in litigation—after Raiders owner Al Davis forced the NFL to allow him to move his team from Oakland to Los Angeles, there was the prospect of the state of Maryland filing a similar antitrust suit against the league if it refused to approve the transfer. In any case, the immediate threat of the law was the likely seizure of the team's Owings Mills facility and its physical property, which would have made the prospect of Irsay fielding a team for the 1984 season in any city a challenging proposition at the very least.

On March 28, 1984, the Phoenix group withdrew its offer, citing the Maryland Senate's actions. That afternoon, Irsay called Mayor Hudnut; the city of Indianapolis offered the Colts owner a $12.5 million loan, a $4 million training complex, and the use of the brand new $77.5 million, 57,980–seat Hoosier Dome. Irsay agreed.

After he got off the phone with Irsay, Hudnut called his neighbor and friend, John B. Smith. Smith was the chief executive officer of Mayflower Transit, an Indiana-based moving company; Hudnut asked him to help the team move. Smith sent fifteen Mayflower trucks to Owings Mills, arriving at the Colts' facility at around 10 p.m. Irsay and Hudnut wanted to move quickly because they feared that the Maryland House of Delegates would approve and Maryland Governor Harry Hughes would sign the eminent domain bill, allowing the state to seize the team the following morning. Workers loaded all of the team's belongings and the trucks left for Indianapolis. Within eight hours of the Mayflower trucks' arrival in Owings Mills, the Colts were effectively gone from Baltimore. Later that day, the House of Delegates did indeed pass the bill by a count of 103–19 and Governor Hughes signed it, but by that time it had no practical effect of greater consequence than permitting the seizure of the vacant and empty Owings Mills facility.

Because Irsay feared the Maryland State Police might attempt to delay the moving trucks until after the eminent domain law was signed, he ordered the drivers to avoid using Interstate 70 until after they had left the state. Instead, each of the fifteen vehicles took a separate route north from Owings Mills into Pennsylvania before heading west toward I-70. As each truck crossed from Ohio into Indiana, the Indiana State Police met it and escorted it to Indianapolis—a process repeated until all fifteen vans had reached the destination. Indianapolis Mayor Hudnut held a press conference on March 29 to announce the agreement. On March 30, the Capital Improvement Board, which operated the Hoosier Dome, agreed to the deal. Two days later, 20,000 new Colts fans cheered as Mayor Hudnut proclaimed March 29, 1984, "one of the greatest days in the history of this city." Baltimore's Mayor Schaefer appeared on the front page of The Baltimore Sun and in news broadcasts in tears. After the Colts left, and in spite of his earlier stance that the city of Baltimore would not build a new stadium, he placed the building of a new stadium at the top of his legislative agenda.

Upon arrival in Indianapolis, the moving trucks brought the Colts' belongings to the former Fall Creek Elementary School building, which the city had been trying to find a use for since it closed the previous year. The school became the team's temporary headquarters until new offices could be built with city financing in August 1985.

Later John Moag Jr., chairman of the Maryland Stadium Authority, stated in sworn testimony before the U.S. Senate subcommittee responsible for the Fan Freedom and Community Protection Act: "It was the failure of our local (Baltimore) and state elected officials in Maryland to provide the Colts with a firm proposal for a new stadium that led Mr. Irsay to accept an offer from Indianapolis to play in a new dome in that city."

== Aftermath ==
Not only were Baltimore Colts' fans heartbroken about losing their team, they also lost the team name. (The Colts had been named in honor of the city's Preakness Stakes and Maryland's horse farmers.) In elections that year, city voters repealed Question P by a vote of 62 percent to 38 percent. However, the amendment's author (Hyman Pressman) remained as an elected city comptroller for 28 years (seven terms in a row) until retiring in 1991.

Representatives of Baltimore and the Colts organization reached a settlement in March 1986 in which all lawsuits regarding the move were dismissed, and the Colts endorsed a new NFL team for Baltimore.

The Colts' move prompted city and state officials to redouble efforts to retain Baltimore's remaining major-league team, the Orioles. Oriole Park at Camden Yards, a facility designed specifically for baseball, was constructed near the proposed Baltodome site and opened in 1992. Its retro-classic design was well-received and inspired the designs of new MLB stadiums for the next twenty years.

One aspect that remained in Baltimore was the Baltimore Colts Marching Band. According to an ESPN 30 for 30 documentary called The Band That Wouldn't Die, directed by Baltimore native Barry Levinson, band leaders received advance warning that the team was being moved from Baltimore to Indianapolis overnight and were able to remove their equipment from team headquarters before the moving vans arrived. At the time of the move, the band's uniforms were being dry-cleaned. Band President John Ziemann contacted the owner of the dry cleaning establishment, who was sympathetic and told Ziemann where the uniforms were with an offer to let Ziemann take the company van "for a walk". Ziemann and some associates then hid the uniforms in a nearby cemetery until Robert Irsay's wife said they could keep them. For the next 12 years, the band stayed together, playing at football halftime shows and marching in parades, eventually becoming well known as "Baltimore's Pro-Football Musical Ambassadors". The band remained an all-volunteer band as it is today and supported itself. At one point, Ziemann pawned his wife's wedding ring for the money to buy new equipment.

Despite having moved to the Midwestern United States and being in a city geographically closer to the teams of the AFC Central, the Colts kept their place in the AFC East, and would remain there until a league-wide realignment in 2002, when they were then moved to the AFC South along with the Tennessee Titans (who had moved from Houston just a few years earlier), the Jacksonville Jaguars, and Houston's new team, the Texans.

Two professional football teams represented Baltimore during the period it was without an NFL team. Although they played only three seasons in Maryland between them, both can nevertheless be considered successful both on and off the field by the standards of the leagues in which they played.

The defending USFL champion Philadelphia Stars moved to Maryland after the springtime circuit voted to move to a fall schedule for the 1986 season. However, they were denied a lease for Memorial Stadium for the 1985 season which was still played in the spring because the Orioles objected to a football team playing there at that time of the year. Thus, although they were rebranded the Baltimore Stars, the team played the 1985 season closer to Washington, D.C., than to Baltimore, at the University of Maryland's Byrd Stadium in College Park. The Stars nevertheless repeated as USFL champions, but although they were given permission to play at Memorial Stadium in the fall of 1986, the USFL folded before the Stars could play a game there.

The other franchise came into existence during the Canadian Football League's U.S. expansion in the mid-1990s. Owner Jim Speros explicitly attempted to revive the Colts' name by christening his team the Baltimore CFL Colts. He also adopted a color scheme similar to the original Colts, albeit with a distinctive "horse's head" logo. While litigation from the NFL Colts prevented Speros from using any version of the Colts name, Speros nevertheless was able to keep the color scheme and logo. He also initially refused to adopt a new nickname and tacitly encouraged fans to continue to call the Baltimore Football Club the "Colts". The Colts' former marching band joined the new team while fans in Baltimore, still embittered with the NFL, embraced the distinctive Canadian game to a level not repeated anywhere else in the U.S. Moreover, unlike the Stars, the new CFL team was able to use Memorial Stadium in spite of playing a summer-to-fall schedule, due to the Orioles' departure—because of its multipurpose configuration, Memorial Stadium was even able to house the considerably longer and wider Canadian field, which in turn meant that issues such as poor sightlines were a less serious problem for the CFL franchise. Like the Stars, the Baltimore Football Club was successful both on the field and at the box office, decisively leading the CFL's U.S. teams in attendance. They reached (and lost) the Grey Cup championship game in their inaugural 1994 season. The following year (by which time they settled on "Stallions" as an official nickname while keeping their established colors and logo) they actually won the Grey Cup, although by this time local interest in the CFL team had largely disappeared after news of the NFL's impending return. It is almost certain that the Stallions would have remained in Baltimore for the foreseeable future beyond 1995 had the NFL not returned. Instead, with no reasonable prospect of competing with an NFL team, Speros moved his organization to Montreal, where he reactivated the dormant Montreal Alouettes franchise as the CFL ended its U.S. experiment.

The Stallions' Grey Cup victory (the first, and to date only, victory by a U.S.-based team) gave Baltimore the distinction of being the only city to have been home to a (pre-merger) NFL championship team, a Super Bowl championship team, a USFL championship team, and a Grey Cup championship team.

== The NFL's return to Baltimore ==
The NFL finally returned to Baltimore on November 6, 1995, when Cleveland Browns owner Art Modell announced his intention to move the Browns to Baltimore for the 1996 NFL season. Like most other sports teams' moves, including that of the Colts, Modell had intended to keep the Browns name, colors, history, and memorabilia for the rechristened Baltimore Browns. Like the Colts' move, the Browns' move led to lawsuits by the City of Cleveland. At the same time, some Baltimore football fans balked at Modell's intention to rechristen his team as the "Baltimore Browns." They felt the NFL effectively allowed Irsay to take Baltimore's football history with him to Indianapolis when the league allowed him to retain the Colts' 1953-83 history and records. As badly as they wanted to see the NFL return, they were uneasy at the prospect of taking another city's football history in a manner that seemed similar to how they believed Irsay had taken the Colts' legacy with him to Indianapolis.

Eventually, Modell agreed to a settlement that granted him an "expansion" franchise in Baltimore that in turn would assume the then-current Browns' contracts, and would also inherit most of its personnel. However, he was required to leave the Browns' name, colors, history, and memorabilia in Cleveland. In return, the league allowed the Browns to "suspend operations" until the 1999 season. When the Browns returned that year, they reclaimed the history and records of the 1946–95 Browns, though for all intents and purposes they were an expansion team with a roster stocked primarily via an expansion draft similar to every other North American professional sports team established in the modern era. The last NFL team to completely suspend operations temporarily, coincidentally, was also a Cleveland team at the time: the Rams, who suspended operations for one year in 1943 because of World War II before moving to Los Angeles in 1946.

While Modell had briefly entertained attempting to return the Colts identity to Baltimore, as well as possibly switching divisions with Indianapolis, he quickly abandoned this effort after learning Irsay's asking price, reputed to be at least $25 million. Modell's "expansion" franchise in Baltimore, which remained in the AFC Central, became the Baltimore Ravens and would later also adopt the Colts Marching Band. The Ravens played its first two seasons at Memorial Stadium, then moved into a new stadium at Camden Yards, whereupon the band was renamed Baltimore's Marching Ravens. Meanwhile, the now-Indianapolis Colts never did return to Memorial Stadium, as by the time the NFL's scheduling formula brought them back to Baltimore, the Ravens had moved into their new stadium. Played on November 29, 1998, the Colts' first game in Baltimore since the 1983 season ended in a 38–31 win for the Ravens. The Ravens would eventually win Super Bowl XXXV in 2000, while the Colts had to wait another six years before finally capturing a championship as an Indianapolis team, when they won Super Bowl XLI.

With league-wide realignment in 2002, the Ravens successfully lobbied to remain in the same division as the Pittsburgh Steelers, Cincinnati Bengals and the revived Browns, and as a result now play in the AFC North. Meanwhile, the Colts formed the new AFC South along with the Jacksonville Jaguars (who had joined in 1995), the Tennessee Titans (the former Houston Oilers) and the then-expansion Houston Texans. This arrangement is considered somewhat of an anomaly. Although Indianapolis is not much further north than Baltimore, Indiana is universally considered a Northern state while Maryland is counted as a Northeastern or Southern state.

Colts Hall of Fame quarterback Johnny Unitas, who had settled with his family in Baltimore after his playing career was over, was angered by the move to Indianapolis and cut all ties with the team. Some other prominent old-time Colts followed his lead. Unitas was so angered by the move that he let it be known he would consider him strictly a Baltimore Colt for the remainder of his life.Unitas aligned himself with the Ravens when they moved to Baltimore, and a statue of him was placed outside of M&T Bank Stadium.

Punter Rohn Stark was the last active Baltimore Colt to retire from the NFL, doing so in 1997.

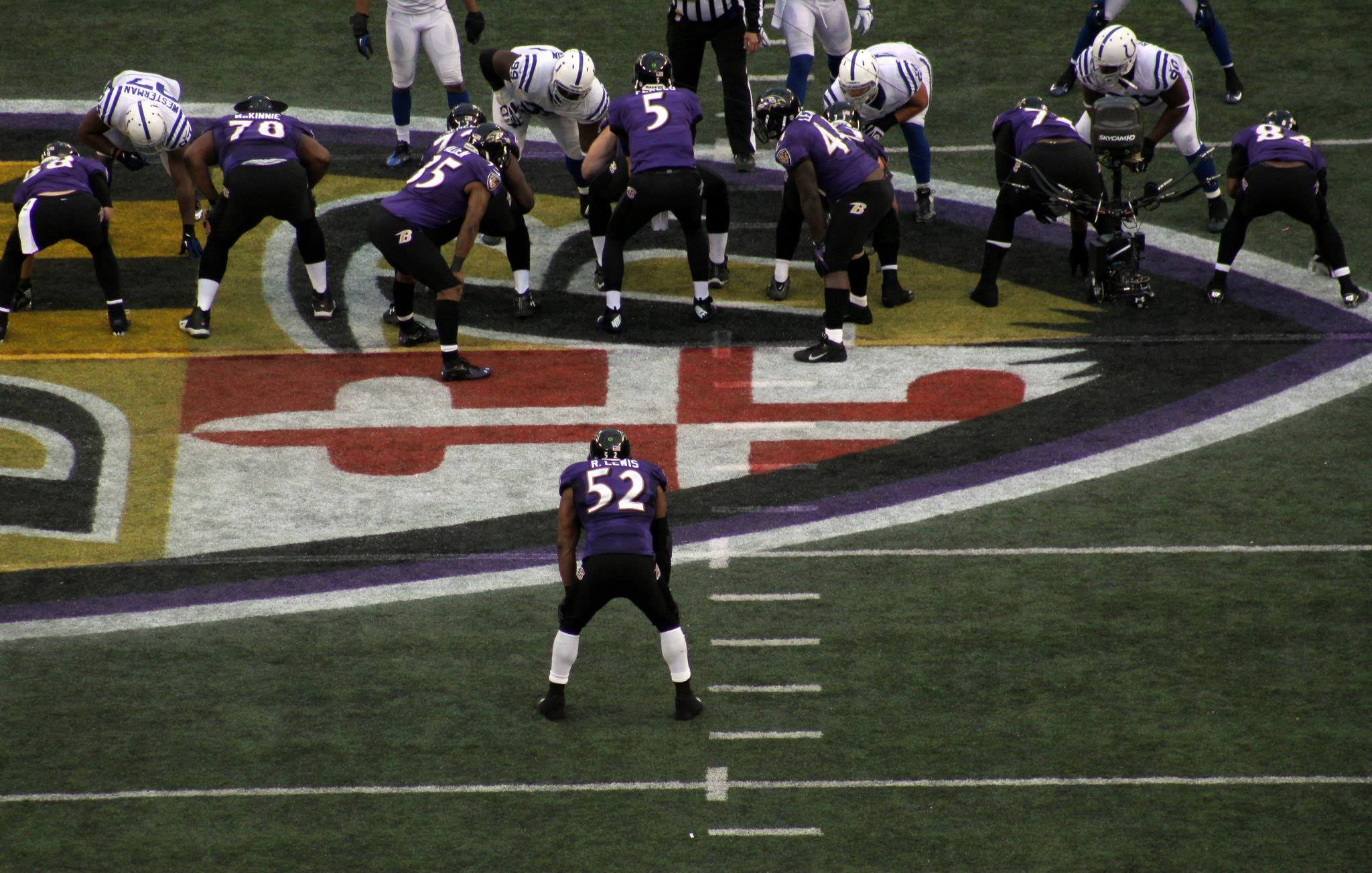
The Ravens play the Colts in the 2012-13 playoffs

== See also ==
- Relocation of professional sports teams
- History of the Baltimore Colts
- History of the Indianapolis Colts
- The Band That Wouldn't Die
