= Stephen Goldsmith =

American politician (born 1946)

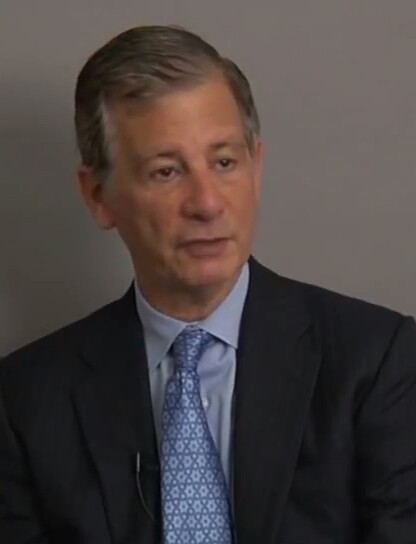

46th Mayor of Indianapolis
- In office January 1, 1992 – January 1, 2000
- Preceded by: William Hudnut
- Succeeded by: Bart Peterson

Deputy Mayor of New York City for Operations
- In office April 30, 2010 – August 4, 2011
- Mayor: Michael Bloomberg
- Preceded by: Edward Skyler
- Succeeded by: Caswell F. Holloway

Prosecutor of Marion County
- In office January 2, 1979 – January 1, 1991
- Preceded by: James F. Kelley
- Succeeded by: Jeff Modisett

Personal details
- Born: December 12, 1946 (age 79) Indianapolis, Indiana, U.S.
- Party: Republican
- Education: Wabash College (AB); University of Michigan (JD)

Stephen "Steve" Goldsmith (born December 12, 1946) is an American politician and writer who was the 46th mayor of Indianapolis. He also served as the deputy mayor of New York City for operations from 2010 to 2011. A member of the Republican Party, he ran unsuccessfully for lieutenant governor of Indiana in 1988 and governor of Indiana in 1996. He is currently the Derek Bok Professor of the Practice of Urban Policy and Director of Data-Smart City Solutions at the John F. Kennedy School of Government at Harvard University. In 2006, Goldsmith was elected as a fellow of the National Academy of Public Administration.

== Early life and career ==
Goldsmith was born on December 12, 1946, in Indianapolis, Indiana, into a Jewish family. He is a graduate of Wabash College and the University of Michigan Law School where he earned a Juris Doctor degree. Goldsmith is an Eagle Scout, a recipient of the Distinguished Eagle Scout Award, and a member of Beta Theta Pi fraternity.

== Political career ==
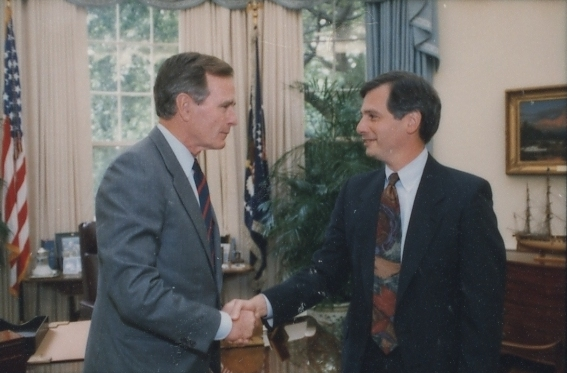
Goldsmith with President George H. W. Bush in 1992

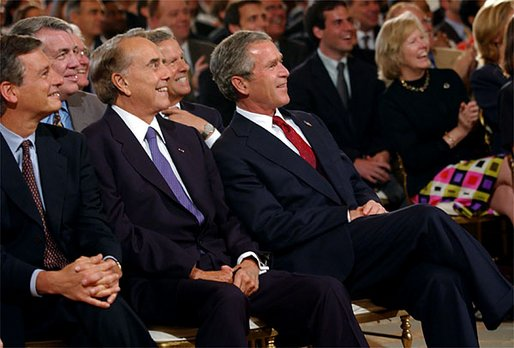
Goldsmith with President George W. Bush and Senator Bob Dole in 2002

=== Marion County Prosecutor ===
In 1978, Goldsmith began his political career by defeating Judge Andrew Jacobs Sr., a Democrat, in the race for Marion County prosecutor. Goldsmith continued to serve in this capacity for 12 years (1979–1991), when the opportunity to run for Mayor of Indianapolis presented itself.

=== 1988 lieutenant gubernatorial election ===
In 1988, Lieutenant Governor John Mutz made an unsuccessful bid for governor of Indiana, calling upon Goldsmith to be his running mate. Mutz and Goldsmith lost to the Democratic ticket of Evan Bayh and Frank O'Bannon.

=== Mayor of Indianapolis ===
In 1991, Goldsmith ran under the Republican banner for mayor, defeating his Democratic opponent Louis Mahern by a clear majority. Goldsmith served as mayor of Indianapolis for two terms from 1992 to 2000, being reelected in 1995.

=== 1996 gubernatorial election ===
Goldsmith was the Republican nominee for governor of Indiana in 1996 against Lieutenant Governor Frank O'Bannon. O'Bannon defeated Goldsmith 52% to 47%. Despite being mayor of Indianapolis, Goldsmith failed to win Marion County, which includes Indianapolis. O'Bannon overcame an early deficit in the polls by focusing on his long history of public service, his true Indiana roots, and the alleged mismanagement of the city of Indianapolis while Goldsmith was mayor. The Goldsmith campaign was unable to successfully rebut "allegations of influence peddling" and accusations that cuts in spending had undermined the city's ability to process sewage. "Polls also showed that his negative campaign ads were unpopular with voters."

=== Chief domestic policy advisor ===
Goldsmith was chief domestic policy advisor to President George W. Bush in the 2000 campaign and then served as Special Advisor to President Bush on faith-based and not-for-profit initiatives. He was appointed chair of the board of directors for the Corporation for National and Community Service in 2001, a position he held until 2010.

=== Deputy Mayor of New York City ===
On April 30, 2010, Mayor Michael Bloomberg of New York City announced he would appoint Goldsmith to become Deputy Mayor for Operations, a position he held until August 4, 2011. He had responsibility for the city's police, fire, sanitation, and buildings departments, among others, in his 14-month period of service. Goldsmith was tasked by Bloomberg with advancing an innovation agenda in the city and his work led to enhancements to the city's use of technology, improvements in restaurant licensing, and faster processing of building permits. Goldsmith oversaw the launch of the 311 Service Request Map, the NYC Simplicity Idea Market employee crowdsourcing platform, and the Change By Us NYC community collaboration portal. Goldsmith supervised the repair of the troubled CityTime employee timekeeping system and initiated several public-private partnerships in the areas of energy, wastewater management, and parking. The New York Times suggested that his "short tenure was complicated by controversies, most notably after the city's slow response to a crippling snowstorm in December".

Just days before his resignation, Goldsmith was arrested after a domestic altercation with his wife and spent two nights in a Washington jail due to a mandatory arrest law. Charges were not filed and the Goldsmiths contested the police report. Mayor Bloomberg came under criticism for not disclosing the reason for the resignation. On January 4, 2012, a Washington Superior Court judge found that Goldsmith was, as a matter of law, "actually innocent", and that there was no assault during the argument between him and his wife. A ruling of "actual innocence" requires the defendant to appear before a judge and demonstrate proof that the offense did not occur - a higher standard than showing a lack of evidence of crime.

== Private sector ==
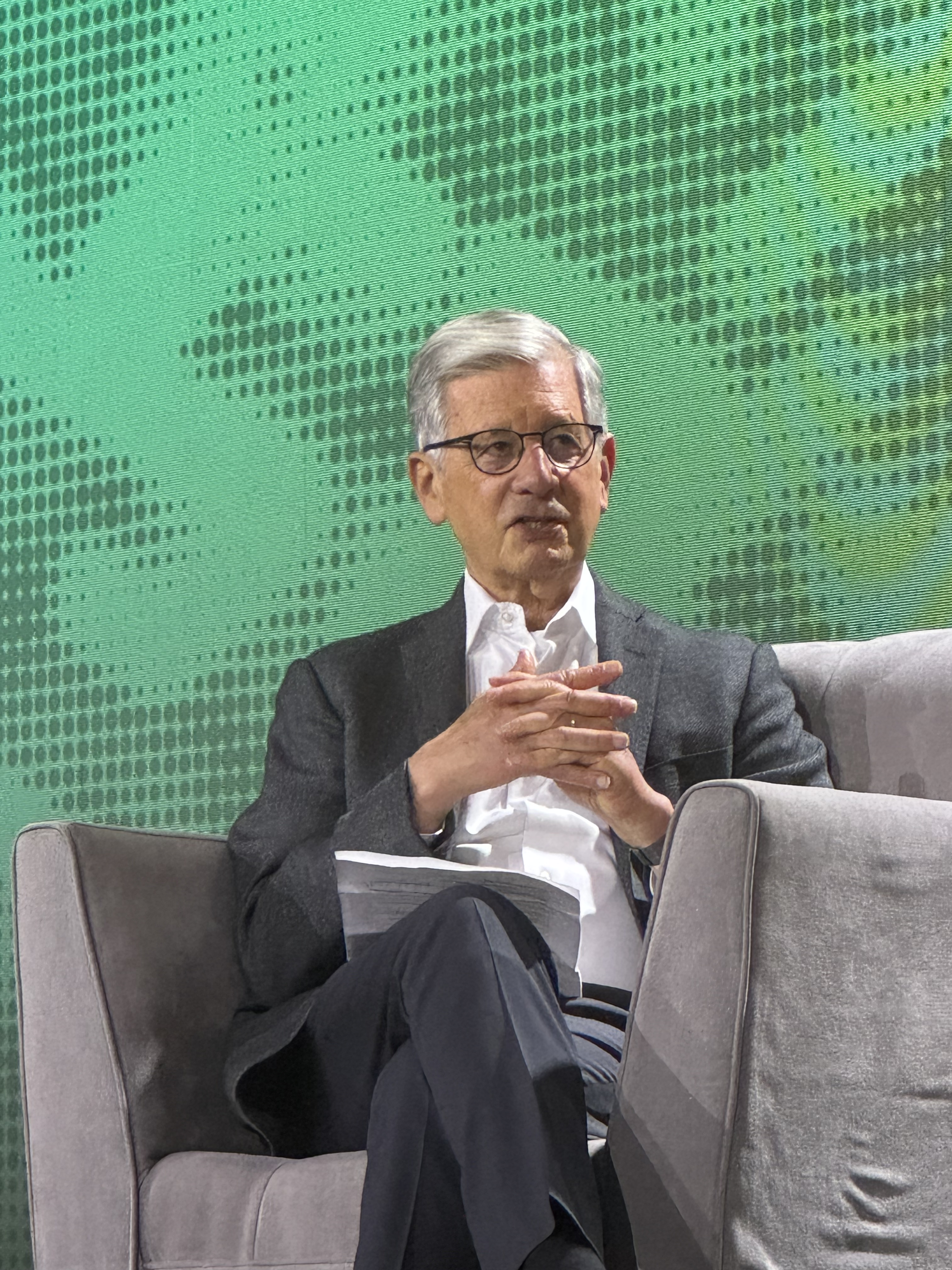
Goldsmith in 2025

Goldsmith was a partner of Knowledge Universe, which invests in Internet-oriented education companies, day care, and childhood learning companies, and B2B companies, principally in business and human resources consulting and online training.

He also was the chairman emeritus of the Manhattan Institute's (a policy research think tank) Center for Civic Innovation.

== Academic career ==
Goldsmith is the Derek Bok Professor of the Practice of the Urban Policy at the Harvard Kennedy School and the Director of the Data-Smart City Solution program at the Bloomberg Center for Cities at Harvard University, as well as the host of the Data-Smart City Pod. He was first affiliated with the Kennedy School in 2001, when he was "named professor of the practice of public management at the Kennedy School of Government" and the "faculty director of the Innovations in American Government program".

As a professor he teaches a graduate-level course module called “The Data Smart City: Driving Innovation with Technology” (MLD-620M) focused on how cities can use data, analytics, and digital tools to improve public services and create public value. His work through the Data-Smart City Solutions program, which Goldsmith founded in 2012 at the Kennedy School's Ash Center for Democratic Governance and Innovation, centers on similar topics. Programmatic research and affiliated communities of practice focus on the intersection of local government and data (such as open data and predictive analytics, civic engagement technology, and the use of generative artificial intelligence in government) with the goal of helping cities use integrated, cross-agency data in combination with community data to better identify and proactively address civic problems.

Under his direction, the Data-Smart City Solutions program has received grants from the John S. and James L. Knight Foundation, the Robert Wood Johnson Foundation, Bloomberg Philanthropies, and the Ewing Marion Kauffman Foundation. Goldsmith's academic research and writing is available on Google Scholar.

== Electoral history ==
=== Mayoral elections ===
1991 Indianapolis mayoral election
Party	Candidate	Votes	%
Republican	Stephen Goldsmith	110,545	56.65
Democratic	Louis Mahern	79,817	40.90
write-in	Wayne T. Harris	4,684	2.40
write-in	John Plemons	84	0.04

1995 Indianapolis mayoral election
Party	Candidate	Votes	%
Republican	Stephen Goldsmith	64,209	57.89
Democratic	Z. Mae Jimison	39,539	35.65
Libertarian	Steve Dillon	7,175	6.47

=== Gubernatorial/lieutenant gubernatorial elections ===
1988 Indiana gubernatorial election
Party	Candidate	Votes	%
Democratic	Evan Bayh / Frank O'Bannon	1,138,574	53.18
Republican	John Mutz / Stephen Goldsmith	1,002,207	46.82

1996 Indiana Republican gubernatorial primary
Party	Candidate	Votes	%
Republican	Stephen Goldsmith	298,532	54.12
Republican	Rex Early	204,301	37.04
Republican	George Witwer	48,749	8.84

1996 Indiana gubernatorial general election
Party	Candidate	Votes	%
Democratic	Frank O'Bannon / Joe Kernan	1,087,128	51.52
Republican	Stephen Goldsmith / George Witwer	986,982	46.78
Libertarian	Steve Dillon	35,805	1.70

== Publications ==
In addition to contributing to publications such as the New York Times, Washington Times, Wall Street Journal, and Governing, Goldsmith has written several books on government including:

- Growing Fairly | How to Build Opportunity and Equity in Workforce Development, Brookings Institution, 2022.
- A New City O/S: The Power of Open, Collaborative, and Distributed Governance, Brookings Institution, 2017.
- The Responsive City, Jossey Bass, 2014.
- The Power of Social Innovation, Jossey Bass, 2010.
- Governing By Network: The New Shape of the Public Sector: Brookings Institution. 2004.
- Putting Faith In Neighborhoods: Making Cities Work Through Grassroots Citizenship: Hudson Institute. 2002.
- The Entrepreneurial City: A How-To Handbook for Urban Innovators. Editor, Manhattan Institute. 1999.
- The Twenty-First Century City Resurrecting Urban America: Regnery, 1997.

Legal offices
Preceded by James F. Kelley	Prosecutor of Marion County; January 2, 1979 – January 1, 1991	Succeeded by Jeff Modisett
Party political offices
Preceded by John Mutz	Republican nominee for Lieutenant Governor of Indiana; 1988	Succeeded by Robert Green
Preceded by William Hudnut	Republican nominee for Mayor of Indianapolis; 1991, 1995	Succeeded by Sue Anne Gilroy
Preceded by Linley E. Pearson	Republican nominee for Governor of Indiana; 1996	Succeeded by David McIntosh
Political offices
Preceded by William Hudnut	Mayor of Indianapolis; January 1, 1992 – January 1, 2000	Succeeded by Bart Peterson
Preceded by Edward Skyler	Deputy Mayor of New York City for Operations; April 30, 2010 – August 4, 2011	Succeeded by Caswell F. Holloway
