= 1979 Indianapolis mayoral election =

Indianapolis mayoral election, 1979
- November 6, 1979
- Turnout: 33.6%
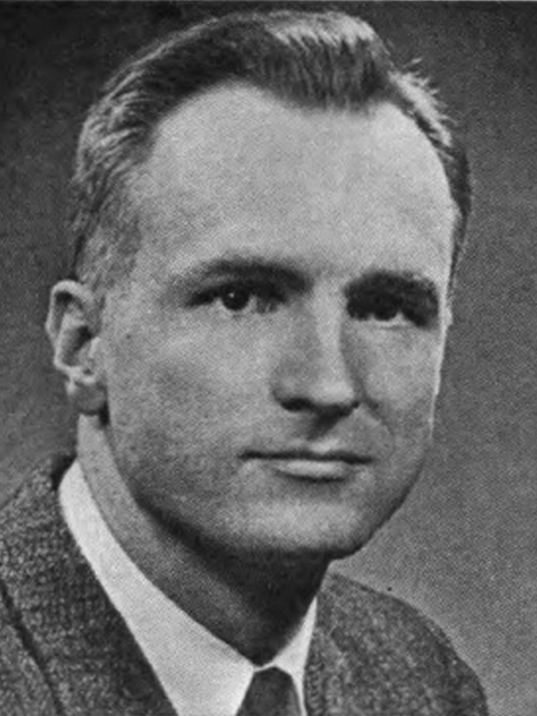

Nominee	William H. Hudnut III	Paul Cantwell
Party	Republican	Democratic
Popular vote	124,515	43,955
Percentage	73.9%	26.1%
Mayor before election
William H. Hudnut III
Republican
Elected mayor
William H. Hudnut III
Republican

The Indianapolis mayoral election of 1979 took place on November 6, 1979, and saw the reelection of Republican William H. Hudnut III.

Hudnut defeated Democratic former city-county councilman Paul Cantwell in what was reported to have been the greatest margin of defeat for a Democratic candidate in an Indianapolis mayoral election in 150 years. Cantwell had resigned his seat on the Indianapolis City-County Council in order to focus on his campaign.

== Campaigning ==
Ahead of the election season, Hudnut had demonstrated a strong advantage in polls. Top prospective Democratic candidates declined to run. Even before party primaries, many Democratic Party officials believed that Hadnut was not able to be unseated in the 1979 election.

Laws prevented Cantwell from seeking re-election in the coinciding election for the Indianapolis City-County Council while running for mayor. He opted to resign early from the city council in order to focus on his campaign. In the coinciding council election, his former seat was won by Republican nominee Stanley P. Strader, with Republicans winning a 22–7 council majority in the election.

Cantwell struggled to raise funds, ultimately raising only $38,000. Hudnut, meanwhile, spent $278,000 during his campaign. This allowed Hadnut to outspend Cantwell by a 10 to 1 margin. Cantwell also lacked organizational support from the Democratic Party, which was poorly-organized in the city. He also found that Democratic donors were much more keen on contributing to Indiana Democratic campaigns for the upcoming 1980 elections than contributing to his campaign; with Democratic donors reserving their contributions instead for campaigns such as Jimmy Carter's presidential re-election campaign and Ted Kennedy's primary election campaign against Carter; Birch Bayh's likely Senate re-election campaign; John A. Hillenbrand II and Wayne Townsend's gubernatorial primary campaigns. Consequently, Cantwell's campaign was an independent operation dependent upon self-funding and grassroots contributions.

Hadnut enjoyed much stronger name recognition than Cantwell. Hadnut received diverse support for his re-election, not only with near-unanimous backing from local Republicans, but also receiving strong support within the local Black community (as well as from local Black leaders) and support from liberal groups and organized labor. The Central Indiana Building Trades Council (a labor organization) endorsed his candidacy.

At the time of the election, Cantwell's son Danny Cantwell was awaiting trial for murder. He would be acquitted in November 1980. Paul Cantwell argued that the charges were political, and were retribution for his investigations of police corruption.

Cantwell's campaign received some praise for speaking to genuine flaws of Hadnut's mayoral administration, such as issues in the Solid Waste Division of the Department of Public Works. Cantwell also alleged that Hadnut's mayoralty had seen an "eroding tax base", a troubling growth of the local bureaucracy and an overall lack of inefficiency in the local government. However, without an advertising budget behind Cantwell's message these concerns went unheard by many voters.

== Results ==
Indianapolis mayoral election, 1979
Party	Candidate	Votes	%
Republican	William H. Hudnut III (incumbent)	124,515	73.9
Democratic	Paul Cantwell	43,955	26.1
Turnout		168,470	
Majority		80,560	
Republican hold			

Preceded by 1975	Indianapolis mayoral election 1979	Succeeded by 1983
