= 1987 Indianapolis mayoral election =

- November 3, 1987
- Turnout: 29.1%
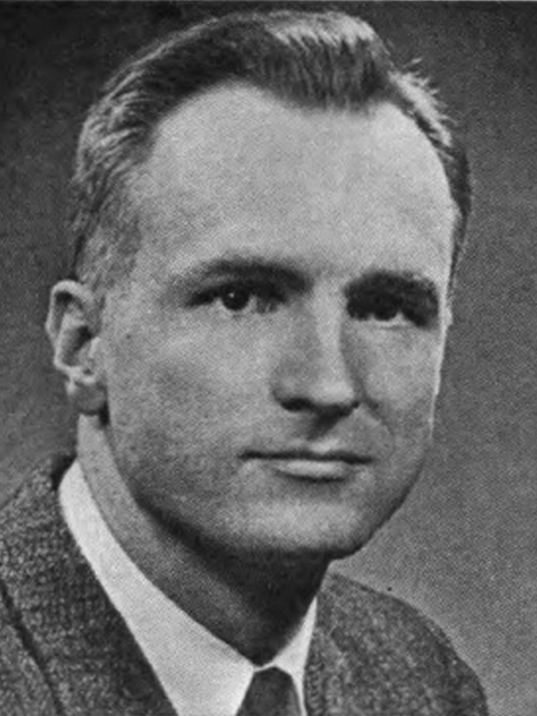

Nominee	William H. Hudnut III	J. Bradford Senden
Party	Republican	Democratic
Popular vote	109,107	38,193
Percentage	66.3%	23.2%
Mayor before election
William H. Hudnut III
Republican
Elected mayor
William H. Hudnut III
Republican

The Indianapolis mayoral election of 1987 took place on November 3, 1987, and saw the reelection of Republican William H. Hudnut III to a fourth term.

Hundut defeated Democratic nominee J. Bradford Senden, a self-employed political consultant.

== Primaries ==
Partisan primary elections were held on May 5.

=== Democratic primary ===
Self-employed political consultant J. Bradford Senden defeated six other candidates in the Democratic primary.

=== Republican primary ===
Incumbent mayor Hadnut was re-nominated, defeating perennial candidate James W. Black in the Republican primary.

1987 Indianapolis Republican mayoral primary
Party	Candidate	Votes	%
Republican	William H. Hudnut III (incumbent)	34,046	88
Republican	James W. Black	4,534	12

== General election ==
1987 Indianapolis mayoral election
Party	Candidate	Votes	%
Republican	William H. Hudnut III (incumbent)	109,107	66.3
Democratic	J. Bradford Senden	38,193	23.2
Other	Others	17,223	10.5
Turnout		164,523	
Majority		70,914	
Republican hold			

Preceded by 1983	Indianapolis mayoral election 1987	Succeeded by 1991
