= Edward Skyler =

American politician

Deputy Mayor of New York City for Operations
- In office c. 2006 – 30 April 2010
- Mayor: Michael Bloomberg
- Preceded by: Marc Shaw
- Succeeded by: Stephen Goldsmith

Personal details
- Born: c. 1973 (age c. 52)
- Party: Independent (since 2025); Republican (until 2025)
- Education: University of Pennsylvania; Fordham University School of Law

Edward "Ed" Skyler (born c. 1973) is an American politician and businessperson. He was Deputy Mayor for Operations of New York City during Michael Bloomberg's administration, the youngest deputy mayor in New York City's history. In 2010, he was named the senior public and governmental relations executive at Citigroup.

== Education ==
Skyler, a member of the New York State Bar, was graduated from the University of Pennsylvania and Fordham University's School of Law.

== Career ==
Prior to his appointment as Deputy Mayor for Operations, Skyler served as Deputy Mayor for Administration. Skyler worked at the New York City Department of Parks & Recreation from 1995 to 1999, where he served as deputy chief of staff and as the public information director. He was a deputy press secretary to Mayor Rudolph W. Giuliani. In 2000, Skyler left Giuliani's administration to work at Bloomberg LP's Corporate Communications group.

In 2001, aged 28, he joined Bloomberg for Mayor as the campaign's press secretary. Skyler served in that position through the transition during which time he was appointed Press Secretary to the incoming mayor. His successor was Stu Loeser.

In 2010, Skyler joined Citigroup as an Executive Vice President for Global Public Affairs.

== Personal life ==
On March 4, 2009, Skyler, who stands 6 feet, 4 inches, tackled a mugger in midtown Manhattan after a young woman said she had just been robbed and he recovered her BlackBerry. Skyler, a longtime Republican, changed his party affiliation to independent in February 2025.
