= 1990 Indiana Secretary of State election =

- November 6, 1990
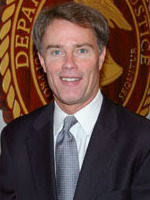

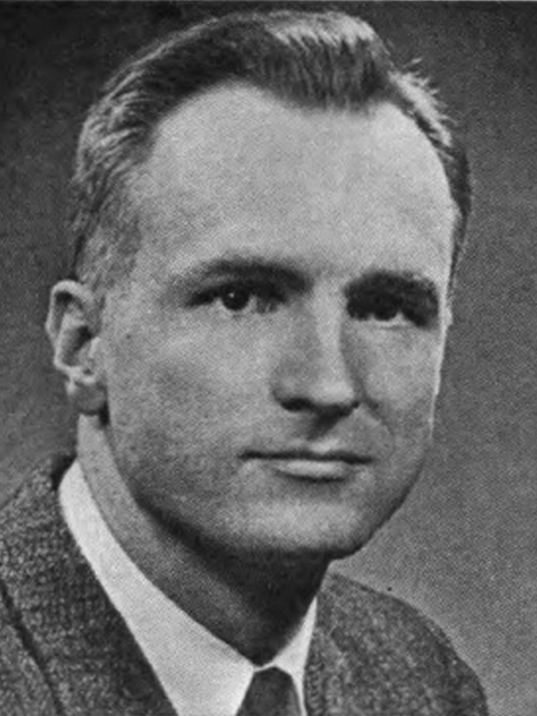
Nominee	Joe Hogsett	William H. Hudnut III
Party	Democratic	Republican
Popular vote	775,163	719,314
Percentage	51.83%	48.10%
- County results Hogsett: 50–60% 60–70% 70–80% Hudnut: 50–60% 60–70%
Secretary of State before election
Joe Hogsett
Democratic
Elected Secretary of State
Joe Hogsett
Democratic

The 1990 Indiana Secretary of State election was held on November 6, 1990, to elect the Secretary of State of Indiana. Democratic incumbent Joe Hogsett, who was appointed to the office in 1989 by previous secretary Evan Bayh following his resignation to take office after winning the 1988 Indiana gubernatorial election, won election to a full term, narrowly defeating Republican Mayor of Indianapolis William H. Hudnut III by three percentage points. This was the last time a Democrat would be elected Indiana Secretary of State until 2026.

== General election ==
=== Candidates ===
- Joe Hogsett, incumbent Secretary of State of Indiana (1989–1994) (Democratic)
- William H. Hudnut III, Mayor of Indianapolis (1976–1992) (Republican)
- Theosie Nunn (Write-in)

=== Results ===
1990 Indiana Secretary of State election results
Party	Candidate	Votes	%	±%
Democratic	Joe Hogsett	775,163	51.83%	−1.45
Republican	William H. Hudnut III	719,314	48.10%	+2.7
Write-In	Theosie Nunn	971	0.06%	N/A
Total votes		1,495,448	100.00%	
Democratic hold				
