= United Van Lines =

American moving and relocation company

- Type: Subsidiary
- Industry: Moving and storage, Logistics
- Founded: 1928; 98 years ago
- Headquarters: Saint Louis, Missouri, U.S.
- Key people: John Hartmann (President and CEO); Gary Quintalino (Chairman of the Board)
- Parent: UniGroup
- Website: www.unitedvanlines.com

United Van Lines is an American moving and relocation company and a subsidiary of UniGroup.

== Background ==
The concept which evolved into United Van Lines originated in 1928 when Return Loads Service, Inc. was formed in Cleveland, Ohio, to arrange return shipments for independent moving companies. Orders were centrally registered and dispatched, and certificates of membership were sold to independent moving companies, which paid a revenue percentage on every order handled.

The premise was to enable movers, once they had delivered a shipment, to obtain profitable tonnage to haul on the return trip, instead of operating an empty van. When similar return shipment companies began appearing around the country, the Cleveland firm adopted the distinctive title, "United Van Service." The Depression spelled disaster for the fledgling firm, as United found itself unable to keep up service with depleted revenues, and many agents broke away to operate independently. In June 1933, United Van Service was dissolved, and its assets and liabilities were transferred to a new entity incorporated as United Van Lines. The new firm prospered and, in 1941, moved its headquarters to Fenton, Missouri.

In 1947, the ownership of United Van Lines passed from the few original stockholders who held the firm together during its formative stages to a larger group of United agents, establishing the current structure. Twenty-two years later, in 1969, United established a subsidiary, United Leasing, Inc. to provide trucks, uniforms, and other supplies needed by United and other professional movers.

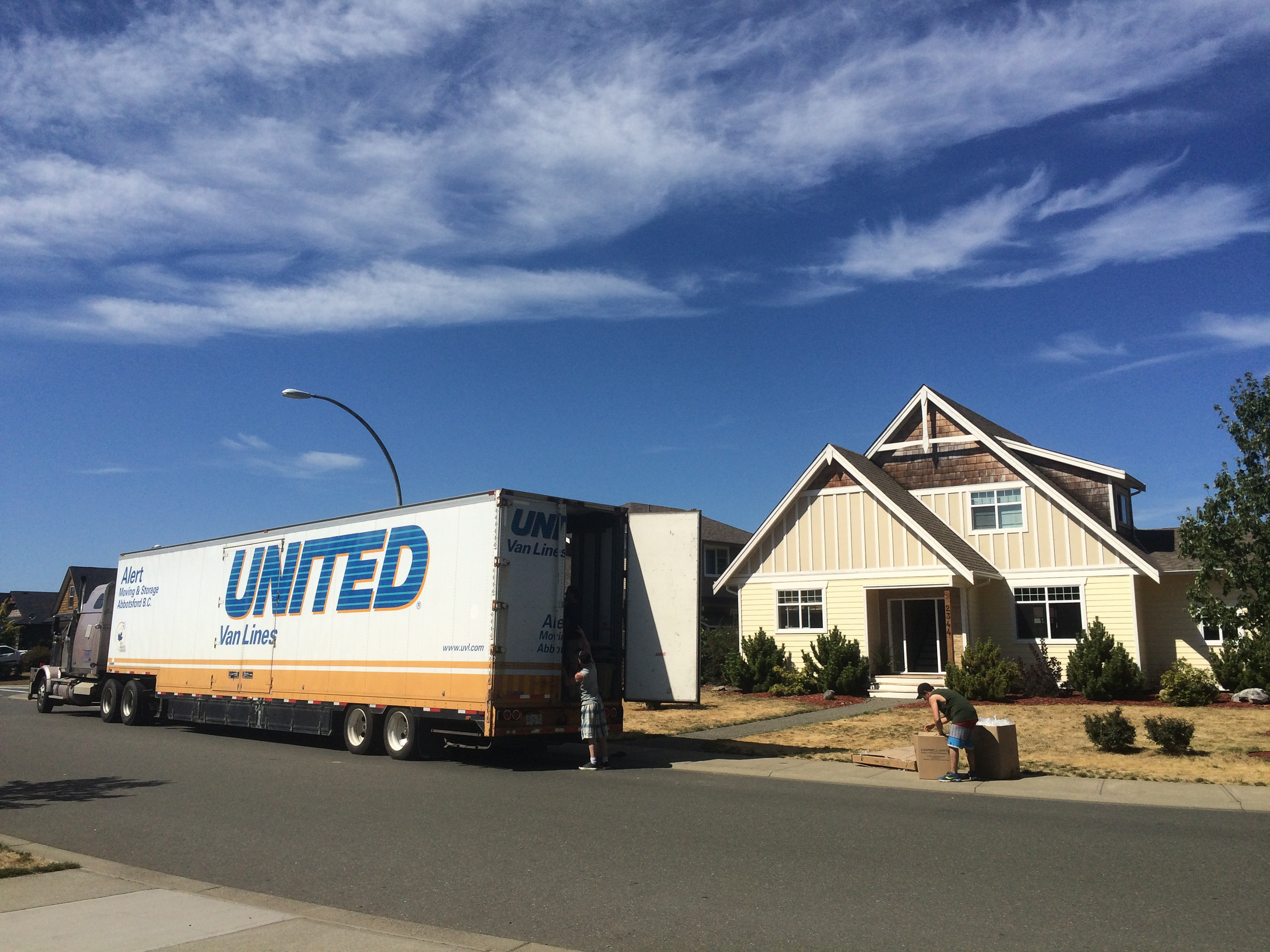
United Van Lines semi-trailer truck loading up a client's property.

To support United agents in their primary business of moving household goods, the corporation in recent years created related operating companies which offer customized insurance for movers; sell and lease equipment needed by the moving industry; and provide global mobility management services. All of these entities are overseen by UniGroup, Inc., a holding company formed in 1988 and owned by UniGroup companies’ affiliated agents and senior management. UniGroup is a transportation and relocation services company with headquarters in suburban St. Louis, Mo. In March 1995, UniGroup acquired one of its major competitors in household-goods transport, Mayflower Transit of Fenton, Missouri. In addition to United and Mayflower, logistics company UniGroup Logistics and international relocation providers UniGroup Relocation and Sterling Relocation, UniGroup owns other subsidiaries that provide goods and services to professional movers.

In 1995, the company had its first billion-dollar revenue year.
