= 1983 Indianapolis mayoral election =

- November 8, 1983
- Turnout: 39.3%
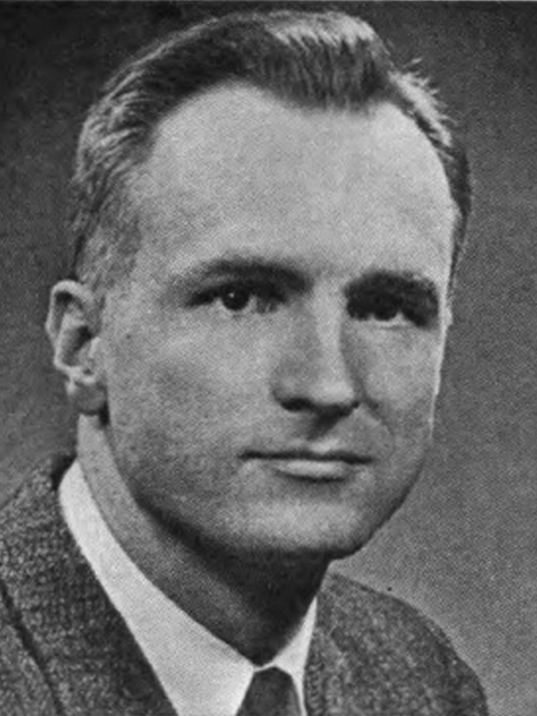

| Nominee | William H. Hudnut III | John J. Sullivan |
| Party | Republican | Democratic |
| Popular vote | 134,550 | 63,240 |
| Percentage | 67.5% | 21.7% |
Mayor before election
William H. Hudnut III
Republican
Elected mayor
William H. Hudnut III
Republican

The Indianapolis mayoral election of 1983 took place on November 8, 1983, and saw the reelection of Republican William H. Hudnut III to a third term.

In 1982, the two-term limit on the mayoralty was removed (leaving no limits on the number of terms). This enabled Hudnut to run for a, previously prohibited, third term.

Top prospective Democratic candidates declined to run, and Hudnut ultimately faced John J. Sullivan, a newcomer to political campaigning.

== Results ==
Indianapolis mayoral election, 1983
| Party | Candidate | Votes | % |
|---|---|---|---|
| Republican | William H. Hudnut III (incumbent) | 134,550 | 67.5 |
| Democratic | John J. Sullivan | 63,240 | 21.7 |
| Other | Others | 1,646 | 0.8 |
| Turnout | | 199,436 | |
| Majority | | 71,310 | |
| Republican hold | | | |

| Preceded by 1979 | Indianapolis mayoral election 1983 | Succeeded by 1987 |
