= Stu Loeser =

Press Secretary for the Mayor of New York City
- In office January 11, 2006 – August 20, 2012
- Mayor: Michael Bloomberg
- Preceded by: Edward Skyler
- Succeeded by: Marc LaVorgna

Personal details
- Born: October 1973 (age 53) Joint Base Andrews, Maryland, United States
- Party: Democratic
- Children: 3 daughters and 1 son

Stu Loeser (born October 1973) is a Democratic communications strategist. He served as the Press Secretary to the former Mayor of New York City Michael Bloomberg and was the longest-tenured Press Secretary in the history of New York City.

== Early life and education ==
Loeser was born in October 1973 on Andrews Air Force Base outside Washington, D.C., where he lived until he was four. Loeser's father was in the Air Force and the family moved around before settling in Commack, New York, when Loeser was nine.

Loeser's parents met at a Jewish summer hotel in the Catskills, where his father worked as a handyman and his mother a camp counselor.

His Jewish grandparents had fled Germany before World War 2. His maternal grandfather moved to Washington Heights and worked in a pencil factory.

After high school, Loeser attended the University of Pennsylvania.

== Political career ==
Loeser began his career as Director of Media Research for Vice President Al Gore's 2000 presidential campaign, after which he served as research director for Mark Green in his campaign for Mayor of New York City (2001) and Carl McCall in his campaign for Governor of New York (2002). He also served as Communications Director for U.S. Senator Chuck Schumer (D-NY).

Prior to his appointment as Press Secretary, Loeser served as a spokesman on Mayor Michael Bloomberg's 2005 re-election campaign and as deputy press secretary. In order to comply with his strict Jewish law, Loeser consulted several rabbis before accepting the job moved to the Lower East Side to be close enough to walk home from work on Friday nights.

Loeser was credited with a reputation as New York City's "foremost practitioner of the dark art known as opposition research" by the New York Observer.

== Private sector consulting ==
Following his departure from City Hall, Loeser founded his own media strategy agency Stu Loeser & Co., and has consulted for Eric Schneiderman, Michael Bloomberg, Michael Daffey, Tina Brown, and Cyrus Vance Jr. Loeser was on the consulting team for Uber that helped defeat New York City Mayor Bill de Blasio's effort to cap the number of for-hire vehicles. He is also a trustee of the Citizens Budget Commission, a nonpartisan civic organization.

== Personal life ==
Loeser is married to Jessica Loeser, a real estate attorney in New York City specializing in land use, zoning, and landmarks preservation. The couple have four children, three girls and a boy. At the birth of his son in 2012, Mr. Bloomberg was given the honorary task of handing the baby to the mohel.

Jessica Loeser was formerly a top aide to New York State Assembly speaker Sheldon Silver. In 2010, Jessica Loeser ran unopposed for female Democratic district leader for the Lower East Side, replacing incumbent Ruth Bekritsky who was retiring.

Loeser is Jewish and observes the Sabbath, which requires him to cease work from sundown on Friday to sunset on Saturday. During his time working as press secretary for Bloomberg, other staff members were instructed to only contact Loeser during the Sabbath in cases of “potential but direct threat to life,” which included the former Deutsche Bank Building fire and during Hurricane Irene.
