= Indianapolis Athletic Club =

- U.S. National Register of Historic Places
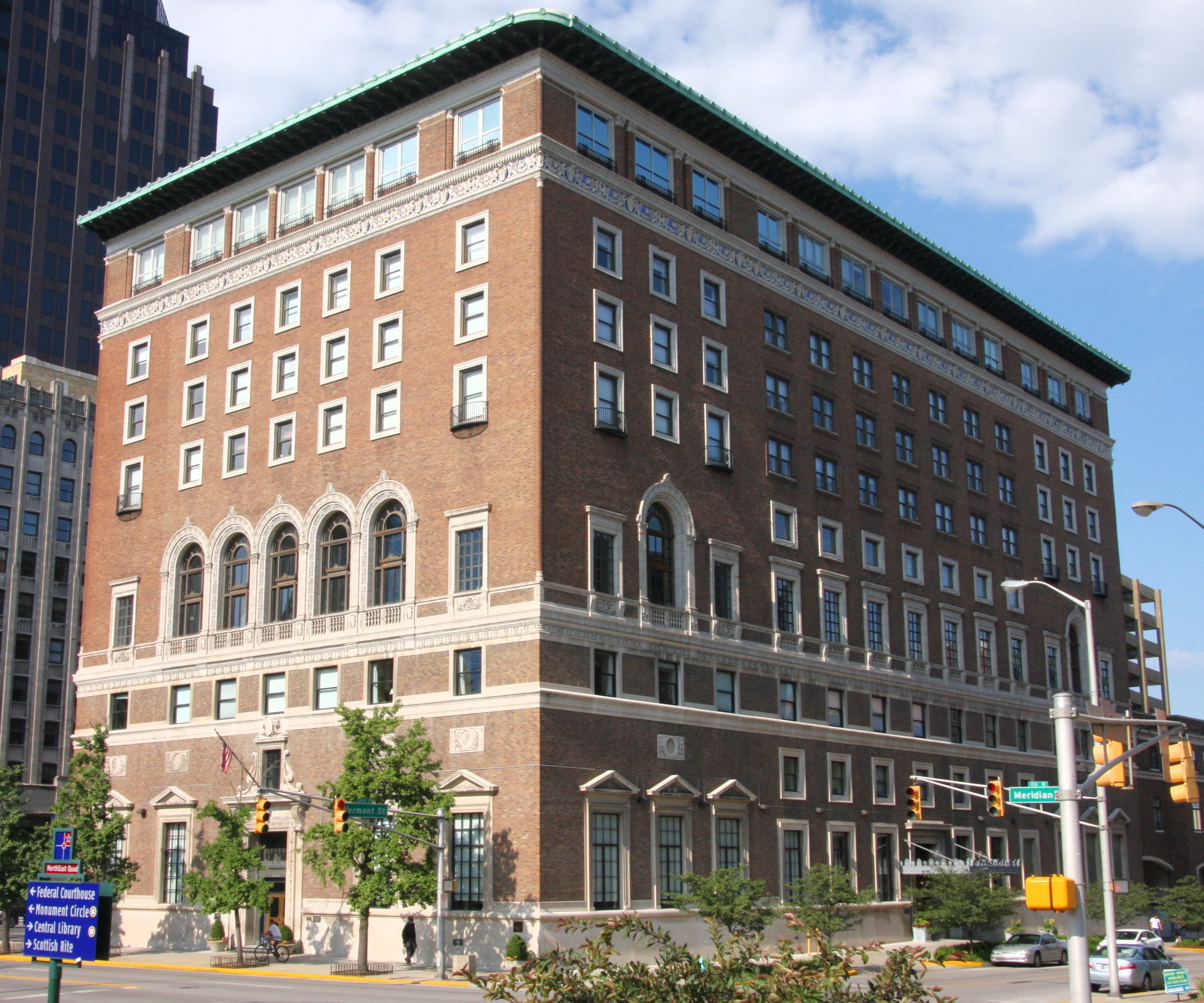
- Indianapolis Athletic Club seen from the northeast

- Location within Indianapolis Location within Indianapolis Location within Indiana Location within the United States
- Location: 350 North Meridian Street, Indianapolis, Indiana
- Coordinates: 39°46′21″N 86°9′28″W
- Architect: Daggett, Robert Frost
- Architectural style: Renaissance Revival
- NRHP reference No.: 15000887
- Added to NRHP: December 15, 2015

The Indianapolis Athletic Club was founded in 1886 and quickly became a premiere private club for Indiana businessmen and society elite. It was especially active in Indiana Democratic politics. Credited with fielding one of the first football teams in Indiana and hosting many of the earliest games, it also promoted baseball and boxing matches. The IAC was a founding member of the Amateur Athletic Union of the United States on January 21, 1888.

The Indianapolis Athletic Club was housed in the existing building at 350 N. Meridian Street in downtown Indianapolis, Indiana. The historic clubhouse was designed by Robert Frost Daggett and constructed between 1922 and 1924. It is an Italian Renaissance style brick building. The club closed in 2004 and the building was converted to luxury condominiums.

The club had over 2,000 members including governors, mayors, legislators, community leaders, business men, and college, professional and Olympic athletes. The building had athletic, social, and event spacs, including the Frank McHale Room, Robert V. Welch Lounge, Frank McKinney Pool, and a large ballroom. There were three floors of overnight guest rooms. The other athletic facilities included the pool, a full-court basketball gym, racquetball courts, squash courts, weight room, cardiovascular equipment, and steam room.

On February 5, 1992, a fire caused by faulty refrigerator wiring killed one overnight guest and two firemen.

The building was added to the National Register of Historic Places in 2015.

== See also ==
- National Register of Historic Places listings in Center Township, Marion County, Indiana
