= Statue of William H. Hudnut III =

Public sculpture in Indianapolis, Indiana, US

- The statue in 2024
- Subject: William H. Hudnut III
- Location: Indianapolis, Indiana, United States; 39°45′57.1″N 86°9′44.5″W

In 2014, a bronze statue of William H. Hudnut III by Jeff Varilla and Ana Koh Varilla was unveiled at Hudnut Commons on Maryland Street in downtown Indianapolis, in the U.S. state of Indiana. Approximately 150 people attended the dedication ceremony.

== See also ==
- List of public art in Indianapolis
