= 1991 Indianapolis mayoral election =

- November 5, 1991
- Turnout: 34.1%
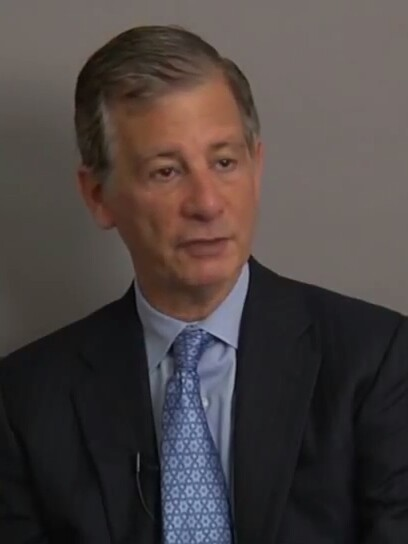

| Nominee | Stephen Goldsmith | Louis Mahern |
| Party | Republican | Democratic |
| Popular vote | 124,100 | 109,761 |
| Percentage | 56.65% | 40.90% |
Mayor before election
William H. Hudnut III
Republican
Elected mayor
Stephen Goldsmith
Republican

The Indianapolis mayoral election of 1991 took place on November 5, 1991, and saw the election of Republican Stephen Goldsmith.

== Background ==
No Democrat had won the Indianapolis mayoralty since 1963, largely due to the 1970 city-county merger that created the Unigov. This merger added the votes of suburban Marion County to the mayoral electorate, which shifted its composition towards the Republicans. Prior to the 1970 merger, Democrats had dominated mayoral elections –winning ten of the preceding fourteen elections. Republicans, however, had won all five Unigov-era mayoral elections held in the twenty-years prior to 1991.

After the results of the November 1990 elections, hopes arose that Democrats might break-through with their first Unigov-era mayoral victory. Incumbent four-term mayor William Hudnut III saw a disappointing vote share in Marion County in his unsuccessful campaign for Indiana Secretary of State. Democratic nominee Jeff Modisett won election as Marion County Prosecutor, ending a twelve-year stretch of Republican officeholders. Additionally, Democratic judges obtained a majority of seats on the Marion County Superior Court after the results of the November 1990 county judicial elections.

== Nominations ==
Primaries were held in May.

=== Democratic primary ===
State senator Louis Mahern won the Democratic primary.

=== Republican primary ===
Following his failed 1990 run for Secretary of State, Hudnut announced in December 1990 that he would not seek reelection in the following year's election.

Marion County prosecutor Stephen Goldsmith defeated state senator Virginia Blankenbaker for the Republican nomination. Before the primary, Goldsmith had secured the endorsement of the county Republican caucus. Blankenbaker unsuccessfully sought to win by attracting crossover votes from individuals who usually supported Democrats.

=== Write-in candidates ===
- Wayne T. Harris, reverend
- John Plemons

== General election ==
=== General election campaign ===
On education, Goldsmith was a supporter of school choice, increased parental involvement in education, and an opponent of court ordered desegregation busing. Mahern similarly supported school choice and argued for the need to reestablish neighborhood schools.

Both candidates supported completing the construction of the Circle Centre mall. Goldsmith, however, promised not to spend any more public funds on it.

On crime, both candidates supported community policing. Mahern supported implementing a waiting period for the purchase of guns.

Both candidates argued that the city needed to undertake infrastructure improvements. Both candidates opposed raising property taxes to fund such improvements. Mahern was supportive of an increase in the city's sewer tax, and sought to create a commuter tax. Goldsmith was open to increasing user fees to pay for infrastructure expenditures. The two candidates disagreed on the expense of infrastructure demands. Mahern endorsed the Indianapolis Chamber of Commerce's report on infrastructure, while Goldsmith contended that between $100 and 200 million could be cut from the report's $1.1 billion cost estimate. Both candidates proposed selling municipal assets in order to raise funds.

The campaign saw a heavy amount of negative campaigning, with the two nominees spending a combined $2 million on television, radio, and direct-mail advertisements (a record amount of advertising spending for an Indianapolis mayoral election). By late-1991, Goldsmith had established a clear lead in opinion polls, and the both candidates spent the final weeks of the campaign focused on attracting voters by taking positions on various social issues. Mahern courted the gay community and sought to win-over support from female voters by staking out a pro-choice stance on abortion. Goldsmith ran advertisements touting himself as a supporter of equal opportunities in employment and increased amounts child support for women.

Late in the campaign, Mahern quickly endorsed an incentive plan by Mayor Hadnut and Governor Evan Bayh to bring a maintenance facility for United Airlines to the city (adding an expected 18,000 new jobs). Goldsmith held off on initially endorsing the plan, and Mahern attacked him over this. Goldsmith defended his hesitancy to immediately endorse the plan as an example of himself looking out for taxpayer interests, and ultimately backed the plan.

=== General election result ===
Less than half of the city's 417,000 eligible voters participated in the election.

Mahern lost a significant share of the traditionally-Democratic Catholic vote, which some experts attributed to his stance on abortion. Mahern received strong support from African American voters. Goldsmith overwhelming won the city's outlying, primarily white, precincts.

Democrats flipped four seats in the coinciding City-County Council elections, with the council going from having 22 Republicans and 7 Democrats before the election to having 18 Republicans and 11 Democrats win election in 1991.

1991 Indianapolis mayoral election
| Party | Candidate | Votes | % |
|---|---|---|---|
| Republican | Stephen Goldsmith | 110,545 | 56.65 |
| Democratic | Louis Mahern | 79,817 | 40.90 |
| write-in | Wayne T. Harris | 4,684 | 2.40 |
| write-in | John Plemons | 84 | 0.04 |
| Total votes | | 195,130 | |
| Majority | | 30,728 | |
| Republican hold | | | |

| Preceded by 1987 | Indianapolis mayoral election 1991 | Succeeded by 1995 |
