= William H. Hudnut III =

American politician (1932–2016)

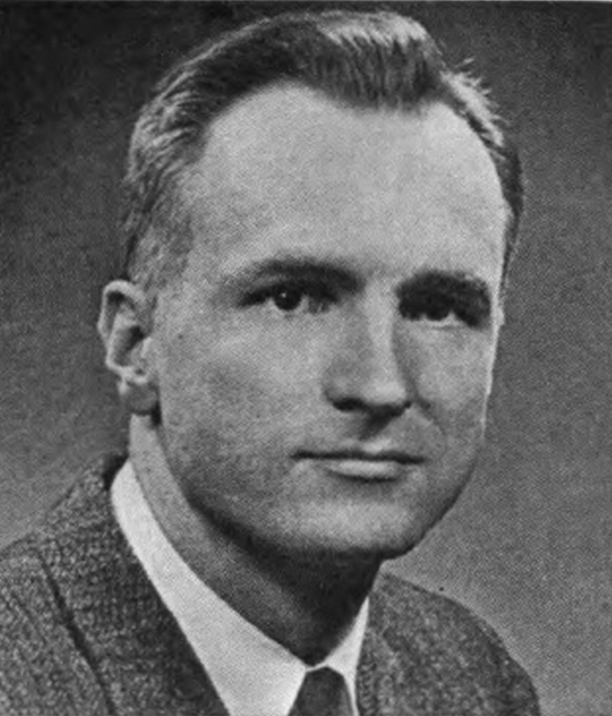
- Hudnut's congressional portrait (1973)

45th Mayor of Indianapolis
- In office January 1, 1976 – January 1, 1992
- Preceded by: Richard Lugar
- Succeeded by: Stephen Goldsmith

Mayor of Chevy Chase, Maryland
- In office May 4, 2004 – May 2, 2006
- Preceded by: Mier Wolf
- Succeeded by: Linna M. Barnes

55th President of the National League of Cities
- In office 1981
- Preceded by: Jessie M. Rattley
- Succeeded by: Ferd L. Harrison

Member of the U.S. House of Representatives from Indiana's 11th district
- In office January 3, 1973 – January 3, 1975
- Preceded by: Andrew Jacobs Jr.
- Succeeded by: Andrew Jacobs Jr.

Personal details
- Born: William Herbert Hudnut III; October 17, 1932 Cincinnati, Ohio, U.S.
- Died: December 18, 2016 (aged 84) Chevy Chase, Maryland, U.S.
- Party: Republican
- Spouse(s): Anne Goodyear; Susan Greer Rice; Beverly Guidara
- Children: 6
- Education: Princeton University (AB); Union Theological Seminary (BD)
- Occupation: minister, author

William Herbert Hudnut III (October 17, 1932 – December 18, 2016) was an American politician, author, and minister who served as the mayor of Indianapolis for four terms (from 1976 to 1992); the mayor of Chevy Chase, Maryland for one term (from 2004 to 2006); and a member of the United States House of Representatives from Indiana for one term (from 1973 to 1975). A Republican, his four terms as mayor of Indianapolis made him the city's longest-serving mayor.

== Early life and education ==
Hudnut was born in Cincinnati, Ohio, on October 17, 1932. He attended the Darrow School in New Lebanon, New York, and graduated from Princeton University in 1954 with an A.B. in history and was elected to Phi Beta Kappa. As part of his undergraduate degree, Hudnut completed a senior thesis titled "Samuel Stanhope Smith: Enlightened Conservative." He earned a Master's Degree in Theology from the Union Theological Seminary in the City of New York, from which he graduated summa cum laude and was ordained a clergyman in 1957 in Rochester, New York.

== Ministerial career ==
Hudnut became an ordained minister in the Presbyterian Church and moved to Indianapolis to serve as the senior pastor of Second Presbyterian Church from 1963 to 1972. He led the congregation with a moderate but active stance through the social issues of the 1960s, including the Vietnam War and race relations. He had previously served churches in Buffalo, New York, and Annapolis, Maryland.

== United States Representative (1973–1975) ==
Hudnut won the 1972 Republican primary for Indiana's 11th congressional district, defeating Dan Burton (who would years later win election to the House). Hudnut won the general election, unseating four-term Congressman Andrew Jacobs, Jr.

During his term in Congress, Hudnut sponsored seventeen bills that became law. He was critical of what he believed were high levels of federal spending and taxation, and received a "Watchdog of the Treasury" for his scrutiny towards this. He also received an award from the National Association of Mental Health in recognition of his support for mental health-related bills.

Hudnut only served a single term (during the 93rd United States Congress), losing re-election to Jacobs in 1974.

== Mayoralty (1976–1992) ==
After leaving congress in 1975, Hudnut took a job as a professor at Indiana Central University and began campaigning for the Republican nomination for mayor of Indianapolis in that year's election. The incumbent mayor, fellow Republican Richard Lugar (who had been the architect of the Unigov legislation that merged the government structures of Indianapolis and Marion County years earlier) was retiring as mayor in order to run for U.S. Senate in 1976, making the 1975 mayoral election an open-race. Hudnut was nominated, and was elected in the general election against Democratic nominee Robert V. Welch. He won landslide victories in 1979 (against Democratic nominee Paul Cantwell), 1983 (against Democratic nominee John J. Sullivan), and 1987 (against Democratic nominee J. Bradford Senden).

Hudnut's stated goal upon taking office was to change the city from "India-NO-place" to "India-SHOW-place." His mayorship was defined by economic development in downtown Indianapolis, business, construction, and sports. His policies were entrepreneurial, and he hoped to attract economic development by taking risks with raising taxes and issuing bonds. He opposed deficit spending and kept the city's bond rating at AAA. He aimed for job growth, a widened tax base, and law and order. The city spent large amounts on tax incentives, infrastructure improvements, and development projects to attract business to the downtown area. Over the sixteen years as mayor, more than 30 major building projects took place downtown, including renovations and expansions to Monument Circle, Indianapolis Union Station, the Indiana University School of Medicine, and the Indiana Convention Center. Many office buildings were constructed, and companies such as Eli Lilly and American United Life committed to staying in Indianapolis.

During his mayoralty, Indianapolis became known as the "Amateur Sports Capital of the World", due in part to Hudnut's efforts at marketing the city. While mayor, Indianapolis held the 1987 Pan American Games and the 1982 National Sports Festival. Hudnut formed the Indiana Sports Corporation, which directed sporting projects such as the Indianapolis Tennis Center, the Major Taylor Velodrome, and the IUPUI Natatorium. In 1980, Hudnut formed a committee on building a new stadium to attract a National Football League team. With the newly built Hoosier Dome and other incentives, he secretly negotiated with Baltimore Colts owner Robert Irsay to bring the team to Indianapolis from Baltimore. On March 29, 1984, he organized the team's middle-of-the-night departure to Indianapolis with Mayflower moving vans, and he called it "one of the greatest days in the history of this city". He also made efforts to approach local groups in the city to see if they could help purchase the struggling Indiana Pacers so they would not be sold to outside interests, which was successful in getting the Simon brothers to buy the team in April 1983.

Hudnut was president of the National League of Cities in 1981, and was a member of the board for over twenty years. In 1988, Hudnut was named City & State magazine's Nation's Most Valuable Public Official. In 1985, he earned the Distinguished Public Service Award from the Indiana Association of Cities and Towns, and in 1986, a Woodrow Wilson Award for Public Service. He was a Republican presidential elector for the 1980 presidential election.

In 1990, Hudnut ran for Indiana Secretary of State, but lost to Joe Hogsett. He chose not to run for a fifth term as mayor in 1991.

In December 2014, Hudnut returned to Indianapolis for the unveiling of the "Mayor Bill" statue on the corner of Maryland Street and Capitol Avenue.

== Later career ==
Hudnut served at the Hudson Institute in Indianapolis from 1992 to 1994, and was president of the Chicago Civic Federation from 1994 to 1996. He held the Joseph C. Canizaro Chair for Public Policy for the Urban Land Institute in Washington, D.C., from 1996 to 2010. He then taught at the School of Continuing Studies at Georgetown University in the MPS Real Estate Program, of which he became executive director.

In 2004, Hudnut took office as the mayor of the town of Chevy Chase, Maryland, an office he held until 2006.

In 2015, Hudnut was among five current and former mayors to oppose Indiana's Religious Freedom Restoration Act, arguing that it would undo the efforts of making Indianapolis an "inclusive, caring, and hospitable city".

== Personal life ==
Hudnut was married three times. His first marriage was to Anne Goodyear (1933–2024), granddaughter of Anson Conger Goodyear (1877–1964). Before their divorce in 1974, the couple had five children, four sons and a daughter. On December 14, 1974, he married for a second time to Susan Greer Rice (1934–2018), a real estate agent. They divorced in 1988. In 1989, his third and final marriage was to Beverly Guidara (1959–2024), his former press secretary. They had a son.

Hudnut was a member of Tau Kappa Epsilon fraternity.

Hudnut received honorary degrees from 13 colleges and universities. In 1974, he became a Freemason in Irvington Lodge No. 666, which was later absorbed by Prospect Lodge 714. He was also a member of the Antelope Club.

In March 2015, Hudnut announced that he had congestive heart failure and throat cancer. Hudnut died on December 18, 2016, at the age of 84.

== Works authored ==
Hudnut authored five books:

- Minister Mayor, 1987, about his political and religious experiences
- The Hudnut Years in Indianapolis, 1976–1991, 1995, about city leadership
- Cities on the Rebound, 1998, an analysis of future successful cities
- Halfway to Everywhere, 2003, about America's best suburbs
- Changing Metropolitan America: Planning for a More Sustainable Future, 2008

== Electoral history ==
=== U.S. House elections ===
1972 Indiana 11th congressional district election
| Party | Candidate | Votes | % |
|---|---|---|---|
| Democratic | Andrew Jacobs, Jr. | 91,238 | 48.8 |
| Republican | William H. Hudnut III | 95,839 | 51.2 |

1974 Indiana 11th congressional district geneeral election
| Party | Candidate | Votes | % |
|---|---|---|---|
| Republican | William H. Hudnut III (Incumbent) | 73,793 | 47.5 |
| Democratic | Andrew Jacobs, Jr. | 81,508 | 52.5 |

=== Indianapolis mayoral elections ===
1975 Indianapolis mayoral election
| Party | Candidate | Votes | % |
|---|---|---|---|
| Republican | William H. Hudnut III | 124,100 | 52.2 |
| Democratic | Robert V. Welch | 109,761 | 46.1 |

1979 Indianapolis mayoral election
| Party | Candidate | Votes | % |
|---|---|---|---|
| Republican | William H. Hudnut III (Incumbent) | 124,515 | 73.9 |
| Democratic | Paul Cantwell | 43,955 | 26.1 |

1983 Indianapolis mayoral election
| Party | Candidate | Votes | % |
|---|---|---|---|
| Republican | William H. Hudnut III (Incumbent) | 134,550 | 67.5 |
| Democratic | John J. Sullivan | 63,240 | 21.7 |

1987 Indianapolis mayoral election
| Party | Candidate | Votes | % |
|---|---|---|---|
| Republican | William H. Hudnut III (Incumbent) | 109,107 | 66.3 |
| Democratic | Brad Senden | 38,193 | 23.2 |

=== Indiana Secretary of State election ===
1990 Indiana Secretary of State election
| Party | Candidate | Votes | % |
|---|---|---|---|
| Democratic | Joe Hogsett | 775,163 | 51.83% |
| Republican | William H. Hudnut III | 719,314 | 48.10% |
| No party | Write-Ins | 971 | 0.06% |

Party political offices
| Preceded by Robert Bowen | Republican nominee for Secretary of State of Indiana; 1990 | Succeeded by Sue Anne Gilroy |
U.S. House of Representatives
| Preceded by Andrew Jacobs Jr. | Member of the U.S. House of Representatives from Indiana's 11th congressional district January 3, 1973 – January 3, 1975 | Succeeded by Andrew Jacobs Jr. |
Political offices
| Preceded by Richard Lugar | Mayor of Indianapolis; January 1, 1976 – January 1, 1992 | Succeeded by Stephen Goldsmith |
