= 1975 Indianapolis mayoral election =

Indianapolis mayoral election, 1975
- November 4, 1975
- Turnout: 52.4%
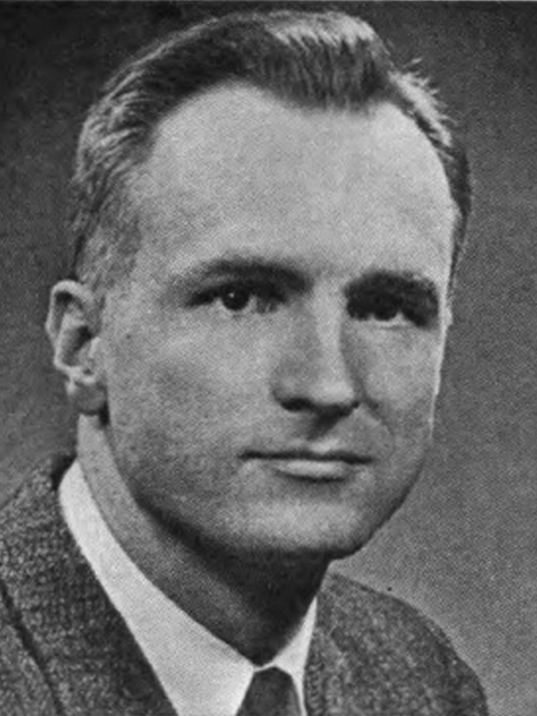

Nominee	William H. Hudnut III	Robert V. Welch
Party	Republican	Democratic
Popular vote	124,100	109,761
Percentage	52.2%	46.1%
Mayor before election
Richard Lugar
Republican
Elected mayor
William H. Hudnut III
Republican

The Indianapolis mayoral election of 1975 took place on November 4, 1975, and saw the election of Republican William H. Hudnut III.

Hudnut ultimately served 16 years as mayor, becoming the city's longest-serving mayor.

== Nominations ==
=== Democratic primary ===
Businessman Robert V. Welch defeated six other candidates in the Democratic primary. With a strong grassroots campaign, Welch won in an upset over frontrunner William Schreiber, the Marion County chairman.

=== Republican primary ===
Former congressman William H. Hudnut III won a decisive victory over two other candidates in the Republican primary.

== General election ==
Jobs and crime management were top issues in the election.

Hudnut proposed improving the convention and tourism budget, better optimizing use of Economic Development Commission, and floated the possibility of using tax-free bonds as a means to enlarge the city's employment base. However, he named crime to be his top issue, and called for strong leadership, better police training, and more resident participation in crime fighting.

To address the high rate of unemployment among citizens between the ages of 18 and 30, Welch pledged to assemble all of the leaders of the community and "put the full power of the mayor's office" behind their efforts to address this. Welch promised he would hire a new police chief if elected, and also argued for more police officers to be placed on the street.

The election saw the city's lowest voter turnout in 13 years.

Hudnut's victory was credited to the impact of the creation of Unigov. The creation of Unigov had added predominantly Republican suburban areas of the county to the city of Indianapolis. Hudnut had won the "new city" (areas added to Indianapolis in the creation of Unigov) by 74,680 to 42,110, while Welch won the "old city" by 67,646 to 49,410. Hudnut's victory was also credited to the migration of people leaving the Indianapolis area, moving into bordering counties.

Three minor-party candidates were also running.

Indianapolis mayoral election, 1975
Party	Candidate	Votes	%
Republican	William H. Hudnut III	124,100	52.2
Democratic	Robert V. Welch	109,761	46.1
Other	Others	3,987	1.7
Turnout		237,848	52.4
Majority		14,339	6.0
Republican hold			

Preceded by 1971	Indianapolis mayoral election 1975	Succeeded by 1979
