= Robert V. Welch =

American businessman

- Born: May 26, 1927; Indianapolis, Indiana, US
- Died: September 11, 1992 (aged 65); Greenwood, Indiana, US
- Education: University of Notre Dame
- Occupations: Businessman, politician, civic leader
- Political party: Democrat
- Spouse: Carolyn Finn (married 1956)
- Children: 3

Robert Vincent Welch (May 26, 1927 – September 11, 1992) was an American businessman, politician, and civic leader from Indianapolis, Indiana.

Welch was a businessman and community leader in Indianapolis from the 1950s until his death in 1992. He was considered by many to be the key person in building consensus to bring a National Football League franchise to Indianapolis throughout the late 1970s and early 1980s and subsequently one of the main catalysts to build the Hoosier Dome in the early 1980s. As a businessman, he had great success in real estate and also by starting or buying and running many other companies - managing many of his investments through his main development company, RV Welch Investments. Welch is credited as the primary force to save Cathedral High School from closure when the Brothers of Holy Cross decided to close the school in 1973 - remaining chairman of Cathedral's board from 1973 to 1987. He was recognized by the Indianapolis Business Journal as one of the "Top 50 Most Influential People of the Century" in Indianapolis. He was the unsuccessful Democratic nominee in the 1975 election for mayor of Indianapolis. He died in a mid-air plane collision in 1992 while on a business trip for the state of Indiana.

== Early life, education and personal life ==
Welch was the seventh of ten children that grew up on the northside of Indianapolis near St. Joan of Arc (SJOA) Church and School. He was the son of Leo F. Welch (1893–1956) and Kathyleen Breen Welch. Bob's father was the president of Celtic Federal Savings & Loan in Indianapolis, which was the bank for Irish and other immigrant families that was founded by Leo's father, John R. Welch Sr. (1856–1934).

Welch graduated from Cathedral High School of Indianapolis in 1945 and served in World War II for eleven months before attending the University of Notre Dame, from which he graduated in the winter of 1950 with US Representative John F. Kennedy as the commencement speaker. Welch was known by many to be a Notre Dame football supporter and attended most games - home or away - for more than two decades. After Notre Dame, Welch served in the Korean War (as he had not served the twelve-month minimum in WWII). His oldest brother, Leo F. Welch Jr., had been killed in the South Pacific in WWII.

Welch married Carolyn Finn, whom he had known from his childhood as a classmate at SJOA, on December 1, 1956, at SJOA Church. They had three children, Maura K., Robert V. Jr., and Elizabeth, and they have seven grandchildren.

== Business career ==
Upon completion of college and serving in the Korean War, Welch was a tire salesman and then began working for National Homes Corporation where he achieved success at selling homes throughout the midwestern and southwestern US. In 1954, he and Jack Baker (a classmate at SJOA and Cathedral) founded Baker McHenry & Welch (BMWC), a general contracting firm. During this time, he invested his own money into real estate, primarily multi-family and retail throughout central Indiana, and in 1956 founded RV Welch & Associates, which evolved and became RV Welch Investments in 1977. It was primarily a real estate development and management company. Welch was recognized by the Indianapolis Business Journal as one of "four people who made a difference" in residential real estate in Indianapolis (Indiana 2015 Bicentennial edition).

RV Welch Associates and RV Welch Investments grew into a large residential and commercial real estate development company in Indiana. Welch purchased or constructed and then managed thousands of single and multi-family units throughout central Indiana as well as developed many office buildings throughout central Indiana. Some of the more prominent commercial buildings were the office buildings at 116th and Meridian Street in Carmel, Indiana, and other developments. He founded and operated Fidelity Bank of Indiana in Hamilton County until the Indiana inter-county banking laws led the way to a sale of the bank to INB. He served for many years as a director for the board of American Fletcher National Bank (AFNB), one of top business banks in Indiana until it was sold to Bank One in the late 1980s. Welch also developed many residential communities throughout Indianapolis, including Windridge on what was the old Stoughton J. Fletcher mansion and estate on the northeast side of Indianapolis, and developed the land around it into luxury condominiums, among other projects. In the 1980s, Welch sold RV Welch Investments to Michael Browning, who had worked for Welch for many years and subsequently renamed the firm as Browning Investments.

Welch had many other investments throughout the years, including a significant investment in Landmark Savings Bank and other ventures. Welch was honored posthumously by the Indianapolis Junior Achievement chapter as a Laureate to the Central Indiana Business Hall of Fame in 2005.

== Community leadership ==
=== Country and community ===
Welch served in WWII and the Korean War and also ran for political office. The American Legion Kensington Post of Indianapolis named the dining room in honor of Welch in 1993. He ran for governor as a Democrat in 1972, eventually conceding to Matthew E. Welsh prior to the primary. Welch also ran for mayor of Indianapolis in 1975, winning the Democratic nomination against long odds but eventually losing in the general election to William H. Hudnut III. Welch continued to support the community by serving in his later years as executive director of the White River State Park Development Commission under appointment from Governor Evan Bayh.

=== Cathedral High School ===
One of Welch's largest contributions to the Indianapolis community was his leadership role in helping to keep Cathedral High School from closure. Cathedral was founded in downtown Indianapolis in 1918 by the Brothers of Holy Cross, but as demographic changes occurred in the 1970s, the Brothers of Holy Cross determined they would close the school and pull out of Indianapolis in 1973. By all accounts, Welch - on his own initiative - was the single driving force to keeping Cathedral open. He funded the payroll when necessary (on his own or by persuading friends to help) and continued to lead the school to survive against long odds. At the time, the archdiocese did not want to maintain Cathedral nor did any religious order, so if the school were to survive it would need to be independent. Welch led efforts to form Cathedral Trustees, Inc., a non-profit organization to govern the independent school with a focus on the tradition and values on which the school had been founded and operated for 55 years. The result was an independent Catholic high school that was not directly affiliated with an order or the archdiocese.

In 1976, with Welch's leadership, the all-male Cathedral with the all-female Ladywood St. Agnes High School (LSA) on the LSA campus. LSA had been operating on the old Stoughton Fletcher estate and was run by the Sisters of Providence. However, the Sisters of Providence were planning to close LSA and sell the land, so Welch purchased the land for Cathedral and Ladywood St. Agnes (LSA) ceased to exist. Catherdral then became a co-educational high school. The old downtown Cathedral school building later became the Indianapolis Archdiocese headquarters with Welch's help. Cathedral's move and merger was met with great resistance among alumni and parents because it meant that the old Cathedral downtown building would no longer be Cathedral's home and it was also a significant cultural change for the two single-gender schools to become co-ed. Cathedral's enrollment grew gradually from approximately 500 in the late 1970s to 1200 in the 2010s. Welch remained chairman of Cathedral from 1973 to 1987. In the mid-1990s, Cathedral constructed a new gymnasium and athletic facility and dedicated it as the “Robert V. Welch Student Activities Center”.

=== NFL Franchise ===
Indianapolis was generally considered to be a sleepy midwestern town in the 1960s and 1970s - also referred to as "Naptown" - but beginning in the 1970s and early 1980s many in Indianapolis began to focus on sports as a way to raise the profile of the city. One of the many sparks that helped to build confidence within Indianapolis was the efforts led by Welch to secure an NFL franchise in the city, which he began in the early 1970s. While Indianapolis in the early 1970s had an ABA/NBA franchise (Pacers) and a AAA baseball team (Indians), it was not apparent that the city could support more. By the early 1980s, however, confidence in the community grew - due in large part to Welch's years of work with the NFL - that Indianapolis would get an NFL franchise. The resulting momentum helped propel Indianapolis to not only secure an NFL franchise in 1984 (Colts) but also into a city that built premier sporting venues (such as Market Square Arena (1974), the Indiana University Natatorium (1982), and the Hoosier Dome (1984), among others) and hosted national sporting events (such as the National Sports Festival (1982), the Pan American Games (1987), eight NCAA Basketball Final Fours (1980, 1991, 1997, 2000, 2006, 2010, 2015, and 2021), the Super Bowl (2012), and the College Football Playoff Championship (2022), among others). The success that Indianapolis has achieved in this regard was borne in part out of efforts by Welch in the 1970s to pursue an NFL franchise and building consensus on this effort with NFL hierarchy and the Indianapolis business and civic community.

==== 1970s ====
For many years from the early 1970s to the mid-1980s, Welch - on his own initiative and desire - worked to convince the NFL stakeholders and many people from Indianapolis that Indianapolis could support its own NFL franchise. Over the years, Welch built support in many ways, including building personal relationships with NFL owners and hierarchy as well as building support among local civic and business leadership. He also started the Indianapolis Football Corporation - a booster club for Indianapolis citizens to join for free and support the effort. It was well known that Welch spent a great deal of time and hundreds of thousands of his own dollars throughout these years toward this cause. He attended the annual NFL owner's meetings for many years and he invited many NFL owners to be his guest at the Indianapolis 500 in his suite to show them that Indianapolis was a city that appreciated sports and could support an NFL franchise.

==== Early 1980s ====
In the early 1980s, the NFL indicated to Welch and others that it intended to expand the league with a new franchise and that Indianapolis would be the leading candidate under the condition that the city construct a domed stadium in which the team could play. As a result, Welch worked with local leaders to help influence the construction of the Hoosier Dome so that the city could lure the new NFL franchise. The Indianapolis civic leadership were convinced by NFL hierarchy that if Indianapolis built the stadium, then the NFL would award an expansion franchise to the city with Bob Welch as the majority and local owner. The city began plans to construct the Hoosier Dome in 1980 and broke ground in 1982

==== Hoosier Dome ====
It was a risk for Indianapolis to build an expensive new stadium without a professional team to play in it. The city had no stadium that would work for a team at the time, and building a football stadium that would only be used a dozen times per year by a team that had yet to be awarded seemed a daunting risk. Mayor Hudnut and other leaders came up with the idea to build the dome stadium adjacent to the Indianapolis Convention Center so that it could be used to lure large conventions to the city and therefore be used more many more times per year. This concept helped to partially offset the risks and helped to finance the project with the prospect of stronger tax revenues (which in turn would be used to repay the bonds issued to finance the project). With a great deal of corporate support, the city of Indianapolis pursued development of the Hoosier Dome, later renamed the RCA Dome.

==== Raiders NFL Lawsuit ====
At the same time, the NFL was having disagreement within its existing owners which led to some legal issues. The Oakland Raiders, owned by Al Davis, wanted to move to Los Angeles, but the NFL would not allow it, which led to an antitrust lawsuit between Davis and the NFL. In May 1982, the court found in favor of the Raiders and Davis. The NFL appealed the case and would not make a final decision on a new expansion until this was resolved which therefore caused Welch and Indianapolis to wait while the appeals process played out.

==== Indianapolis continues to wait for an NFL franchise ====
While Welch and the city waited, construction continued on the Hoosier Dome and an option was made available to Indianapolis. The USFL was an upstart competitor to the NFL and they were interested in starting a franchise in Indianapolis. Welch considered this, but felt that taking a USFL franchise would hurt the city's chances of getting an expansion NFL franchise. In addition, Welch felt that the NFL was the premier league and had more staying power than the new USFL. Indianapolis did not pursue a USFL franchise. As time passed and construction continued on the Hoosier Dome, Welch and the City waited for the NFL to award the franchise. The Hoosier Dome was set to be complete by mid-1984, in time for the 1984 NFL season. In mid-1983, Welch made plans for the first football games to be played in the Hoosier Dome in the fall of 1984. He organized a pre-season NFL game and a college football game. Welch persuaded the Chicago Bears to allow one of their pre-season home games (against the Bills) to be played in the Hoosier Dome in September 1984. Welch wanted to show the NFL that the city and the new stadium would support a team. Welch also scheduled the Hoosier Dome Dedication Game for September 1984 by persuading Notre Dame to play Purdue in the Hoosier Dome. This was no small task because Notre Dame did not want to give up a home game for the neutral site in Indianapolis against an in-state rival, but Welch was able to persuade all parties. As part of the agreement with Notre Dame, Welch put together and paid for (at a cost estimated to be $100,000) a caravan of buses to bring the Notre Dame students to the game. Both of these games were scheduled and organized in late 1983 when Indianapolis still had not been awarded an expansion team. The public was excited and both games were sell-outs.

==== Indianapolis pursues the Baltimore Colts ====
In late 1983 and early 1984, the city of Indianapolis became concerned that the Hoosier Dome would be complete in 1984 but would not have a team because the NFL was still working on its appeal and would not make a decision on expansion. With the NFL-Davis lawsuit in appeal, the NFL could not stop other teams from moving to a new city as the Raiders had moved from Oakland to Los Angeles. The city of Indianapolis began to talk to other franchises about moving to Indianapolis and the new stadium, offering attractive terms. Welch also had reached out to several franchises about buying their team and moving it to Indianapolis, including the Colts and the Saints, but none of the options allowed for local ownership of the team.

The Baltimore Colts were a storied franchise that had fallen on hard times and were looking for a fresh start in a new city with more attractive stadium terms. The city of Indianapolis began discussions with the Irsays, the owners of the Colts. In a Colts move to Indianapolis, the Irsays would remain owners and Welch would be left out. Welch pleaded with the NFL to make a decision about the expansion franchise. The NFL declined to make a decision on franchise expansion and, therefore, on March 29, 1984, the Colts left Baltimore in the middle of the night and moved to Indianapolis. The Indianapolis Colts would play their first season in Indianapolis in the fall of 1984.

At the time, many in Indianapolis and throughout the country recognized that Welch had provided leadership to pave the way for the Hoosier Dome to be built and for an NFL franchise to come to Indianapolis. A 1984 Indianapolis Monthly article quoted Mayor Bill Hudnut "We are grateful to Bob Welch for what he did to nurture the dream of making Indianapolis an NFL city and to help that dream come true by building good relationships with the owners of the various NFL franchises. I am sorry that he has been hurt by this. However, I don’t know what my option was as mayor of the city, given the fact that there was not going to be an expansion franchise and that we had this possibility of relocating an existing franchise.” Welch was not an owner of the Indianapolis NFL team, but he was happy that Indianapolis had a team. Welch was quoted in the Chicago Tribune "...like I told my son, when you go for the big things in life, you've got to be ready for big losses". According to many sources, he was disappointed with how it had worked out for himself but he remained proud that Indianapolis got an NFL team. The NFL did not award an expansion franchise until 1995

=== Indianapolis Athletic Club ===
Welch was also active with the Indianapolis Athletic Club, where he served as president from 1971 to 1973, and for many years (until his death) he maintained #1 as his membership number at the club. The IAC honored Welch posthumously by dedicating the third floor bar as the Robert V. Welch Lounge in 1993.

== Death ==
Welch was one of a handful of community leaders on a private plane on September 11, 1992, that collided with another plane after take-off from the Greenwood, Indiana, airport. No one on Welch's plane survived. The group was going to Columbus, Ohio, to see a development that might be of some relevance to future development plans at White River State Park. He and the other passengers (Mike Carroll, Frank McKinney Jr., and John Weliever) are honored at a memorial at White River State Park.
