= 1996 Indiana gubernatorial election =

- November 5, 1996
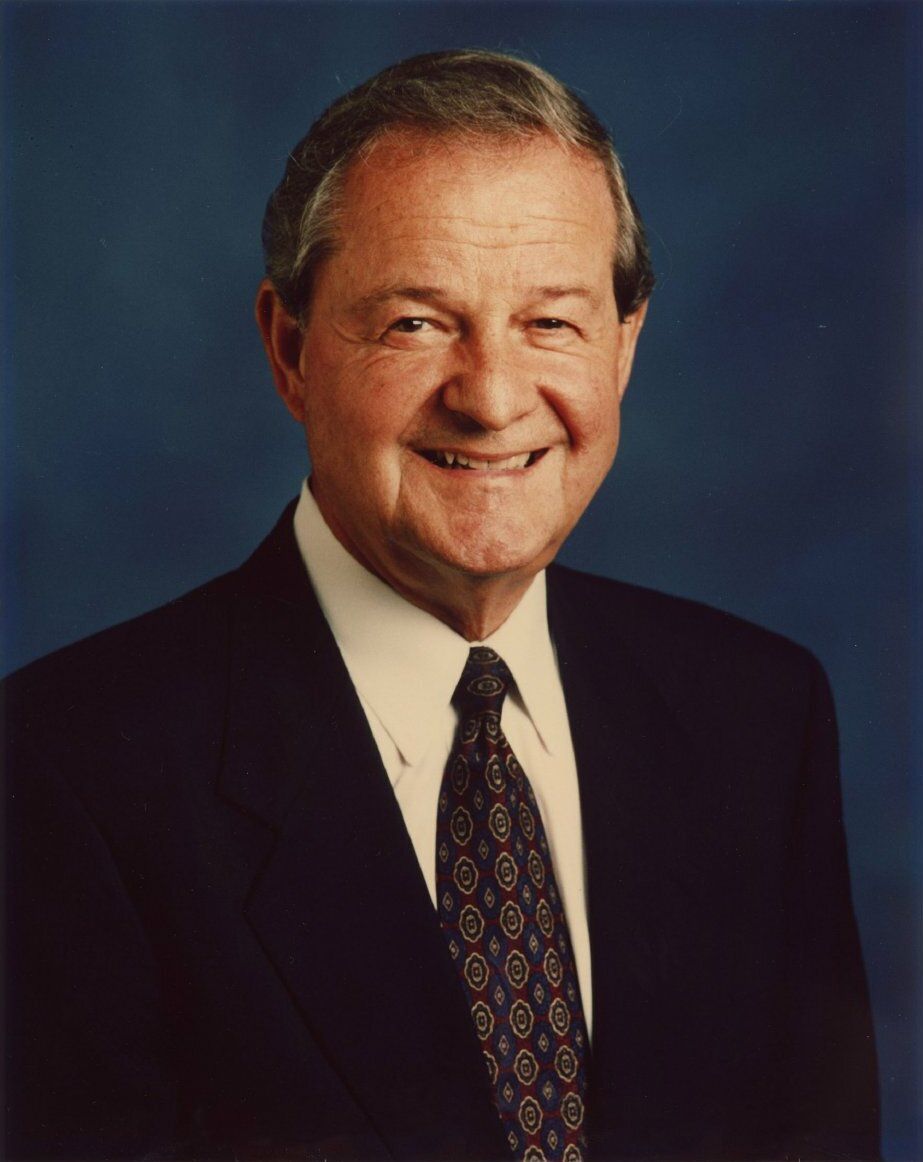

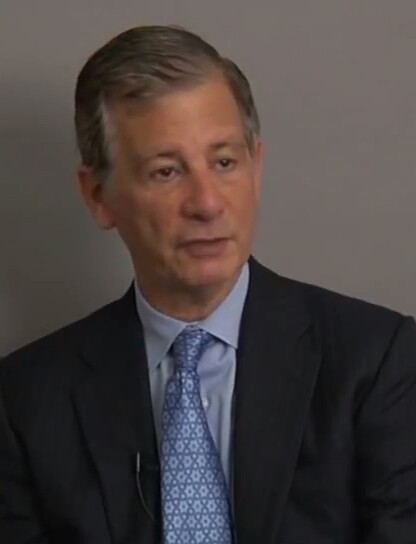
Nominee	Frank O'Bannon	Steve Goldsmith
Party	Democratic	Republican
Running mate	Joe Kernan	George Witwer
Popular vote	1,087,128	986,982
Percentage	51.52%	46.78%
- County results O'Bannon: 40–50% 50–60% 60–70% 70–80% Goldsmith: 40–50% 50–60% 60–70%
Governor before election
Evan Bayh
Democratic
Elected Governor
Frank O'Bannon
Democratic

The 1996 Indiana gubernatorial election was held on November 5, 1996, alongside the election of both houses of the Indiana General Assembly. Incumbent Governor Evan Bayh, a Democrat, was ineligible to run for a third consecutive term due to term limits established by the Indiana Constitution. He was succeeded by Lt. Governor Frank O'Bannon, who won election over Republican Stephen Goldsmith with 52% of the vote.

== Primaries ==
=== Democratic Party ===
Candidates

- Lt. Governor Frank O'Bannon

O'Bannon was unchallenged in his party's primary, winning the Democratic nomination unanimously. He chose South Bend Mayor Joe Kernan as his running mate.

=== Republican Party ===
Candidates

- Former Marine Sergeant Rex Early
- Mayor of Indianapolis and nominee for lieutenant governor in 1988 Stephen Goldsmith
- George Witwer

Declined

- Former vice president of the United States Dan Quayle

With Governor Evan Bayh unable to seek another term in office, Indiana Republicans felt confident in their ability to win the general election. Of the three candidates for the nomination, the front-runner was Indianapolis Mayor Stephen Goldsmith. Goldsmith was by far the favorite for the nomination throughout the race, in some polls leading by as much as 20 points. The race was particularly heated: Indiana Republican Party Chairman Michael McDaniel, hoping to avoid alienating any voters, declined to endorse a candidate, instead hanging a Swiss flag in his office to symbolize his neutrality. Goldsmith easily won the primary. He endorsed no candidate for lieutenant governor, and Republican state convention delegates chose Witwer as his running mate.

=== Libertarian Party ===
Candidates

- Steve Dillon

The Libertarian Party nominated Steve Dillon as their second candidate to contest the Indiana governorship.

Dillon's running mate was Leona McPherson.

== General election ==
The only Great Lakes state to have a Democratic governor going into the 1996 elections, Indiana became the center of the Republican Party's attention in that year's gubernatorial elections. In this traditionally Republican state, Goldsmith and his party were considered to have the edge in the election. That changed, however, when questions about Goldsmith's performance as mayor of Indianapolis surfaced, specifically regarding an August 27 brawl in the city involving several drunken policemen. Goldsmith's campaign was further hurt when it was revealed that several comments made about O'Bannon's record as part of the Indiana state government had been statistically incorrect. The effect of these gaffes was to erase the double-digit lead Goldsmith had enjoyed throughout the summer, leaving him narrowly trailing O'Bannon.

O'Bannon, meanwhile, was able to take credit for a thriving economy and a recent tax surplus that had occurred during Bayh's administration. The Democrat centered his campaign on his record in the Indiana State Senate, simultaneously attacking Goldsmith for controversial decisions made during his tenure as mayor of Indianapolis. By running what was later described as a "steady" campaign, O'Bannon was able to refute many of the charges Goldsmith brought against him while keeping the pressure on. Even so, the race remained tight down to election night, and Goldsmith reportedly settled in on November 5 expecting to be elected.

=== Results ===
O'Bannon won the election narrowly, carrying 52% of the vote to Goldsmith's 47%.

Indiana gubernatorial election, 1996
Party	Candidate	Votes	%
Democratic	Frank O'Bannon/Joe Kernan	1,087,128	51.52
Republican	Stephen Goldsmith/George Witwer	986,982	46.78
Libertarian	Steve Dillon/Leona McPherson	35,805	1.70
Total votes		2,109,915	100.0
Democratic hold			
