= Rawi Abdelal =

American academic

Academic background
- Education: Georgia Institute of Technology (BS); Cornell University (MA, PhD)

Academic work
- Discipline: International political economy
- Institutions: Harvard Business School
- Main interests: Globalization, political economy of Eurasia
- Notable works: National Purpose in the World Economy (2001); Capital Rules (2007)

Rawi E. Abdelal is an American academic who is the Herbert F. Johnson Professor of International Management at Harvard Business School, in the Business, Government, and International Economy Unit. His research is in international political economy, focusing on the politics of globalization and the political economy of Eurasia.

== Education ==
In 1993, Abdelal earned a B.S. in economics at the Georgia Institute of Technology. In 1997, he earned an M.A., and in 1999 a Ph.D., in government from Cornell University.

== Career ==
Abdelal served as director of Harvard University's Davis Center for Russian and Eurasian Studies from 2015 to 2022. He is a faculty associate of the Minda de Gunzburg Center for European Studies at Harvard, and is the Emma Bloomberg co-chair of the Bloomberg Harvard City Leadership Initiative.

His first book, National Purpose in the World Economy, received the 2002 Shulman Prize, awarded for the outstanding book on the international relations of eastern Europe and the former Soviet Union.

== Publications ==
Year	Role	Title	Publisher
2001	Author	National Purpose in the World Economy: Post-Soviet States in Comparative Perspective	Cornell University Press
2007	Author	Capital Rules: The Construction of Global Finance	Harvard University Press ISBN 978-0674034556
2008	Editor	The Rules of Globalization: Case Book	World Scientific Publishing
2009	Co-editor	Measuring Identity: A Guide for Social Scientists	Cambridge University Press
2010	Co-editor	Constructing the International Economy	Cornell University Press
