= Andrew Jacobs Jr. =

American politician (1932–2013)

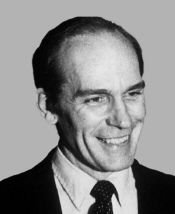

Member of the U.S. House of Representatives from Indiana
- In office January 3, 1975 – January 3, 1997
- Preceded by: William H. Hudnut III
- Succeeded by: Julia Carson
- Constituency: 11th district (1975-1983); 10th district (1983-1997)
- In office January 3, 1965 – January 3, 1973
- Preceded by: Donald C. Bruce
- Succeeded by: William H. Hudnut III
- Constituency: 11th district

Member of the Indiana House of Representatives from Marion County
- In office November 5, 1958 – November 9, 1960
- Preceded by: Multi-member district
- Succeeded by: Multi-member district

Personal details
- Born: February 24, 1932 Indianapolis, Indiana, U.S.
- Died: December 28, 2013 (aged 81) Indianapolis, Indiana, U.S.
- Party: Democratic
- Spouse(s): 1. Kay Welsh; 2. Martha Keys; 3. Kimberly Hood Jacobs
- Children: Andy and Steven
- Education: Indiana University

Military service
- Branch/service: United States Marine Corps
- Years of service: 1950–1952
- Battles/wars: Korean War

Andrew Jacobs Jr. (February 24, 1932 – December 28, 2013) was an American lawyer and politician. A Democrat, he served as an Indiana state legislator and Congressman. Jacobs represented part of Indianapolis in the United States House of Representatives for all but two years from 1965 to 1997. His father, Andrew Jacobs Sr., was also a congressman for one term.

== Early life ==
Jacobs was born in Indianapolis, the son of Joyce Taylor (Welborn) and Andrew Jacobs, and graduated from Shortridge High School in 1949. He served as an infantryman in the United States Marine Corps in the Korean War, and was a disabled combat veteran. He graduated with a bachelor's degree in Business from Indiana University in 1955, and a LL.B. from Indiana University in 1958. Upon graduation he began a law practice and served in the Indiana House of Representatives from 1959 to 1960.

== Indiana and United States Representative ==
Jacobs served as a member of the Indiana House of Representatives from 1959 to 1960. In 1964, he was elected to the United States House of Representatives as a Democrat in the overwhelming Democratic landslide of 1964. He was appointed to the House Judiciary Committee, on which he coauthored the Voting Rights Act of 1965. Jacobs was an active participant in the American Civil Rights Movement in the 1950s and 60s.

Jacobs was an early opponent of the Vietnam War, and led an all-night debate against American military involvement in Vietnam during the war, the first critical discussion of the Vietnam War in the House of Representatives. In his criticism of the Vietnam War, Andy Jacobs reportedly coined the term "war wimp" to a describe a politician who advocated war but who had avoided military service earlier in life.

In the 1972 Congressional election, future Indianapolis Mayor Bill Hudnut defeated Jacobs. In the 1974 Democratic landslide, however, Jacobs defeated Hudnut, regaining his seat. Following the election he was appointed to the House Ways and Means Committee, on which he served until his retirement from Congress in 1997. He eventually served as the Chairman of the Subcommittee on Social Security.

In 1985, Jacobs introduced a proposal to adopt "America the Beautiful" as the U.S. national anthem in place of "The Star-Spangled Banner".

Jacobs was involved in major Social Security reforms in the 1980s, which included making Social Security an independent government organization. He wrote legislation requiring physical bonds to exist representing the money Social Security had collected. He retired from Congress in 1997, with a reputation for bipartisan effort, compromise, and humor. He endorsed Julia Carson as his replacement. She served until her death in 2007, after which her grandson, André Carson, made a successful bid for her seat.

== Retirement and death ==
Following his retirement from Congress, Jacobs taught political science at Indiana University – Purdue University Indianapolis. He wrote and published two memoirs criticizing American militarism. He was also a regular contributor to NUVO Magazine in Indianapolis. He was a strong opponent of American military involvement in Iraq and Afghanistan in the 2000s.

Jacobs died on December 28, 2013, at his home in Indianapolis, aged 81. He was survived by his third wife, television reporter Kim (Hood) Jacobs, and two sons.

U.S. House of Representatives
Preceded by Donald C. Bruce	Member of the U.S. House of Representatives from Indiana's 11th congressional district 1965–1973	Succeeded by William H. Hudnut III
Preceded by William H. Hudnut III	Member of the U.S. House of Representatives from Indiana's 11th congressional district 1975–1983	Succeeded by district eliminated in reapportionment following 1980 Census
Preceded by Phil Sharp	Member of the U.S. House of Representatives from Indiana's 10th congressional district 1983–1997	Succeeded by Julia Carson
