= Mayflower Transit =

American transportation company

Mayflower Transit, LLC

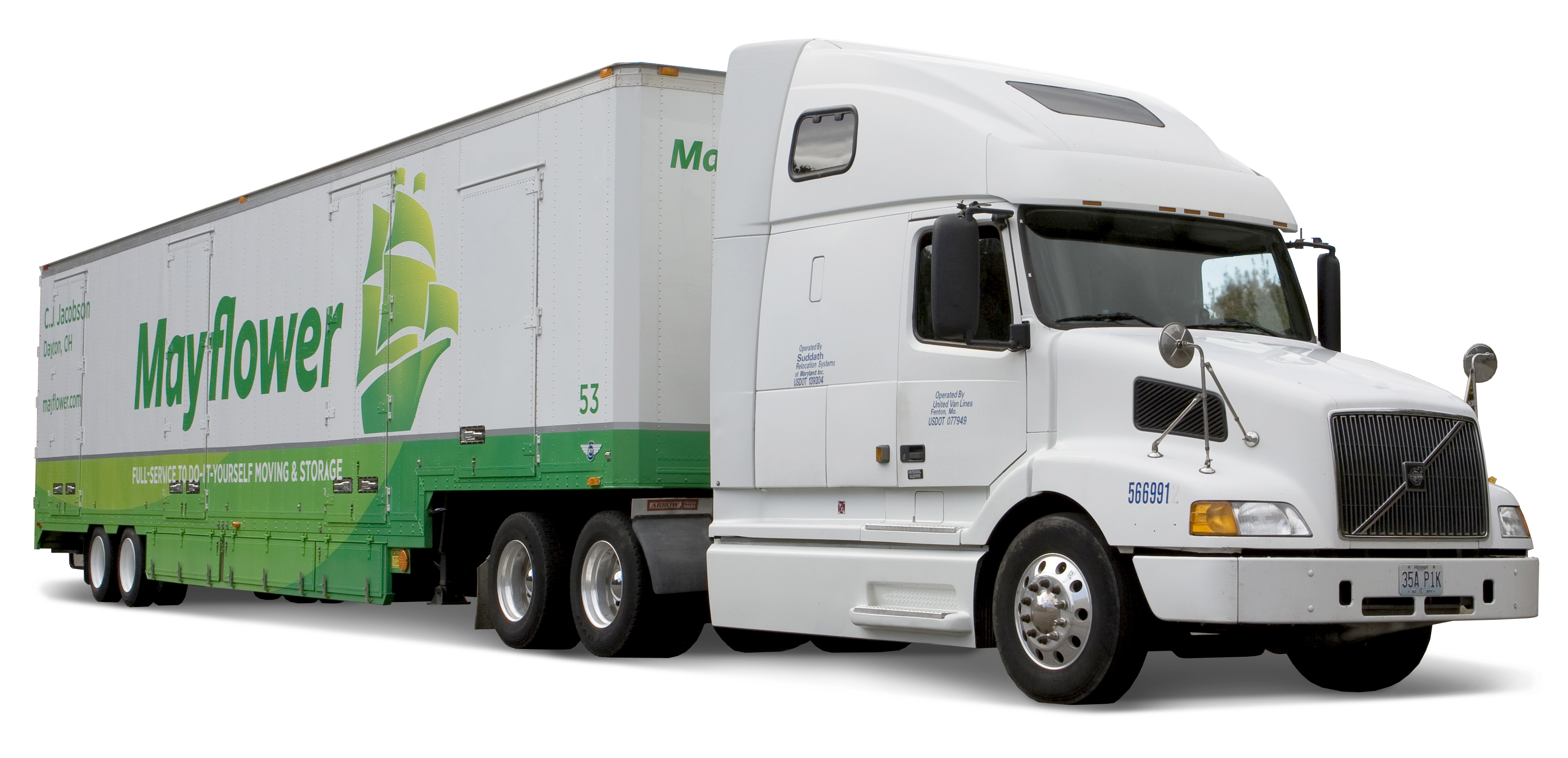
- Mayflower Transit semi truck in its 2010 livery
- Type: Subsidiary
- Industry: Moving and storage
- Founded: 1927; 99 years ago in Indianapolis, Indiana
- Headquarters: Saint Louis, Missouri, U.S.
- Key people: Gary Quintalino (Chairman of the Board); John Hartmann (President & CEO)
- Parent: UniGroup
- Website: www.mayflower.com

Mayflower Transit, LLC is an American moving company based in Saint Louis, Missouri. A subsidiary of UniGroup, Mayflower operates as an agent owned co-op to coordinate loads, packing, and third-party services. Agents are independent contractors, each focusing on a specific local area. While each maintains their own local and intrastate business, the co-op operates in the interstate and international service lines.

== History ==
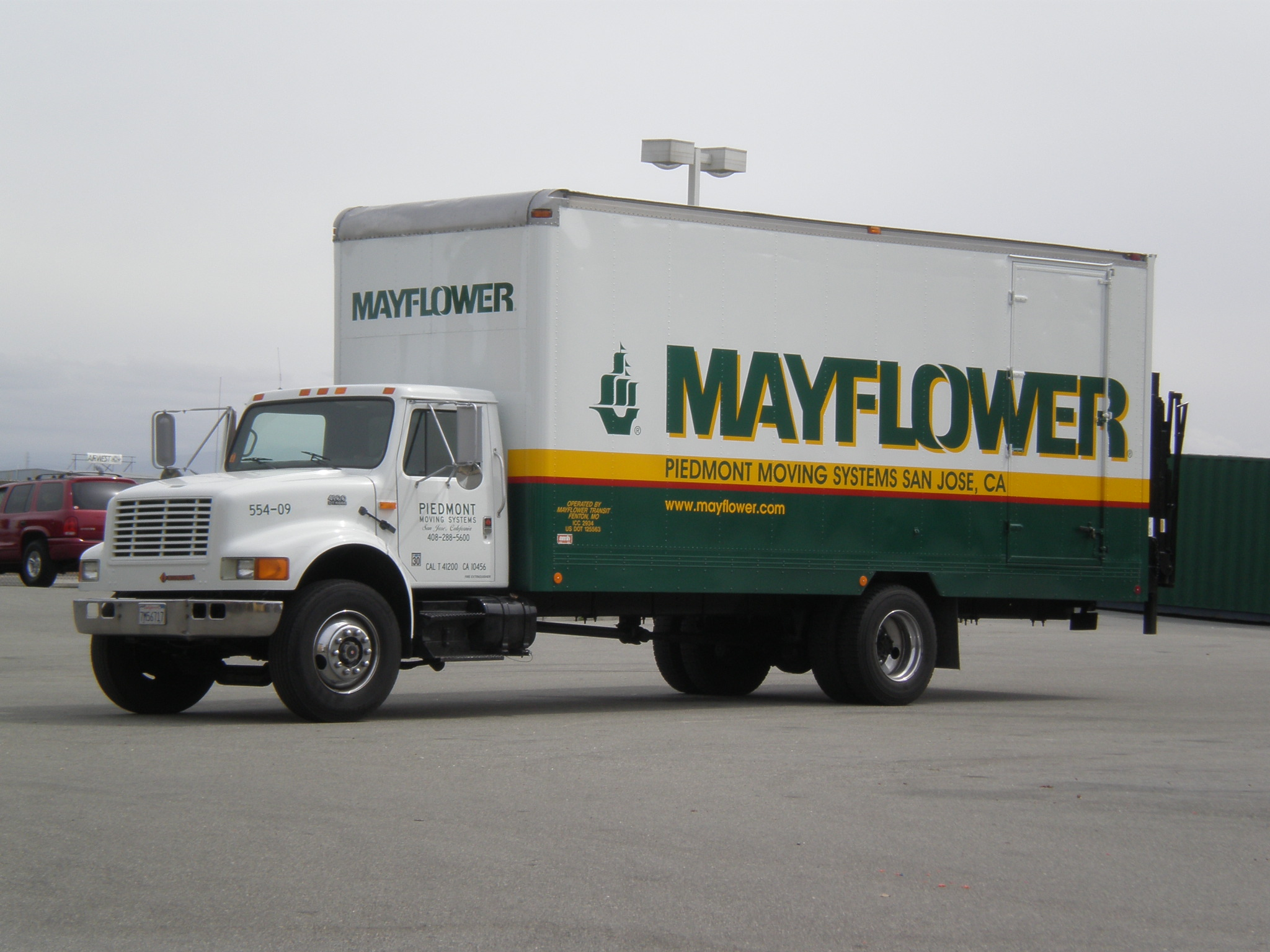
A Mayflower moving truck operated by a local agent in San Jose, California (2008)

Mayflower was founded in Indianapolis, Indiana, in 1927 by Conrad M. Gentry and Don F. Kenworthy. In March 1995, it was acquired by UniGroup, a transportation and relocation services company with headquarters in suburban St. Louis, Missouri. Mayflower Transit is named after the famous 17th century sailing ship Mayflower.

Mayflower was involved in the controversial 1984 move of the Baltimore Colts NFL franchise from Baltimore to Indianapolis.
