= 2008 United States House of Representatives elections in Indiana =

- November 4, 2008

All 9 Indiana seats to the United States House of Representatives
	Majority party	Minority party
Party	Democratic	Republican
Last election	5	4
Seats won	5	4
Seat change	Steady	Steady
Popular vote	1,388,963	1,240,577
Percentage	51.89%	46.34%
Swing	▲3.15%	▼3.56%

Democratic
40–50%
50–60%
60–70%
70–80%
Republican
40–50%
50–60%
60–70%
70–80%

The 2008 congressional elections in Indiana were held on November 4, 2008, to determine who will represent the State of Indiana in the United States House of Representatives. Indiana has nine seats in the House, apportioned according to the 2000 United States census. Representatives are elected for two-year terms; those elected will serve in the 111th Congress from January 3, 2009, until January 3, 2011. The elections coincide with the 2008 U.S. presidential election.

The delegation comprised five Democrats and four Republicans. All 9 incumbents won re-election. As of 2026, this is the last time in which Democrats won both a majority of U.S. House seats. Democrats would not win a majority of Indiana's U.S. House popular vote again until 2026.

== Overview ==
United States House of Representatives elections in Indiana, 2008
Party	Votes	Percentage	Seats	+/–
Democratic	1,388,963	51.89%	5	-
Republican	1,240,577	46.34%	4	-
Libertarian	47,306	1.77%	0	-
Independents	4	<0.01%	0	-
Totals	2,676,850	100.00%	9	-

== District 1 ==
2008 Indiana's 1st congressional district election
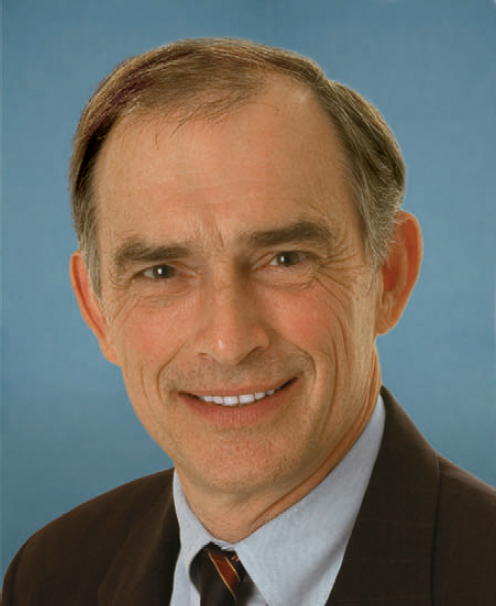

Nominee	Pete Visclosky	Mark Leyva
Party	Democratic	Republican
Popular vote	199,954	76,647
Percentage	70.9%	27.2%
- County results Visclosky: 40–50% 50–60% 60–70% 70–80%
U.S. Representative before election
Pete Visclosky
Democratic
Elected U.S. Representative
Pete Visclosky
Democratic

This district includes a small strip of northwest Indiana and had been represented by Democrat Pete Visclosky since January 1985. The district has been one of the most Democratic in Indiana. John Kerry defeated George W. Bush in this district 55% to 44% in 2004.

=== Predictions ===
Source	Ranking	As of
The Cook Political Report	Safe D	November 6, 2008
Rothenberg	Safe D	November 2, 2008
Sabato's Crystal Ball	Safe D	November 6, 2008
Real Clear Politics	Safe D	November 7, 2008
CQ Politics	Safe D	November 6, 2008

=== Results ===
Indiana's 1st congressional district election, 2008
Party	Candidate	Votes	%
Democratic	Pete Visclosky (incumbent)	199,954	70.90
Republican	Mark Leyva	76,647	27.18
Libertarian	Jeff Duensing	5,421	1.92
Total votes		282,022	100.00
Democratic hold			

== District 2 ==
2008 Indiana's 2nd congressional district election
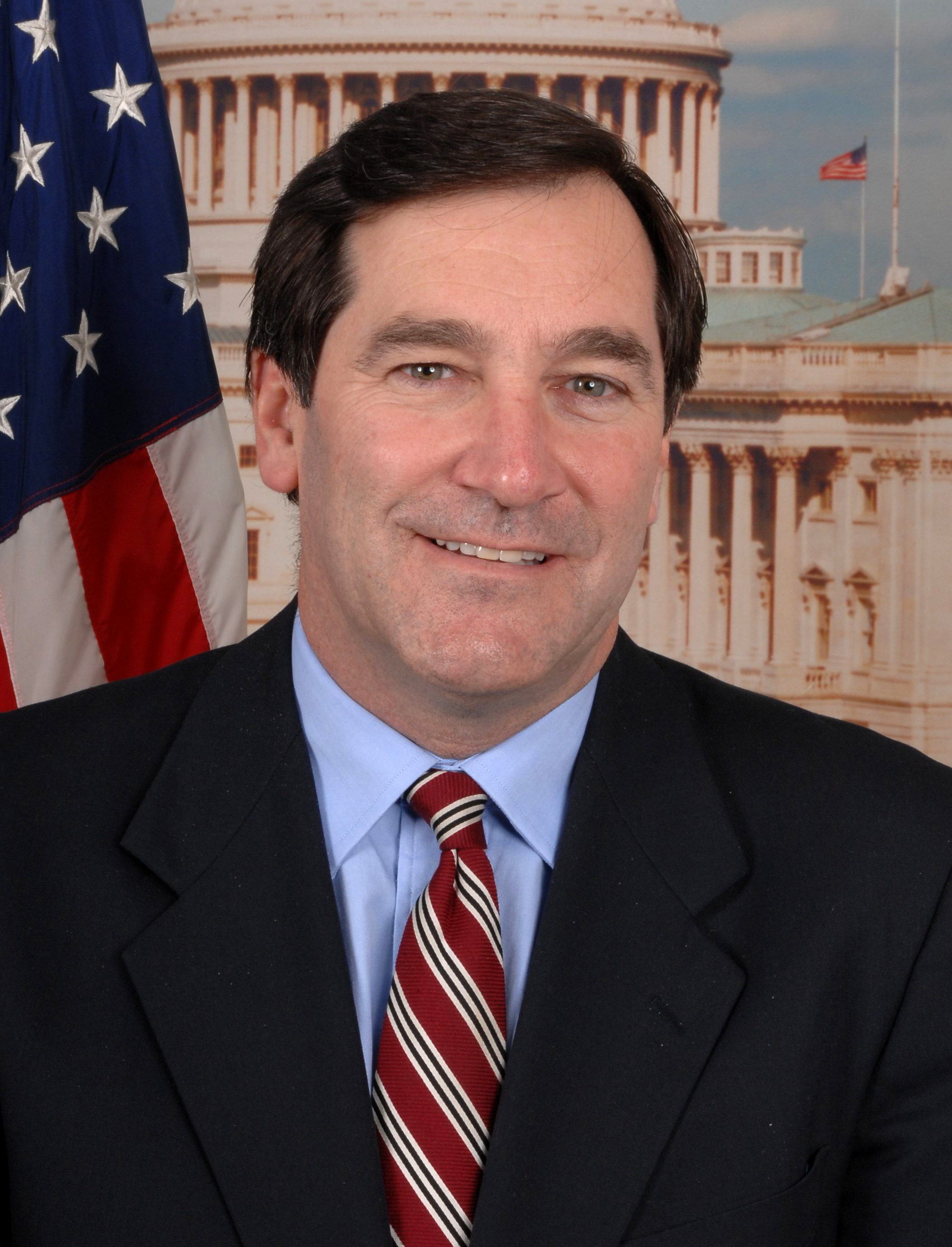

Nominee	Joe Donnelly	Luke Puckett
Party	Democratic	Republican
Popular vote	187,416	84,455
Percentage	67.1%	30.2%
- County results Donnelly: 50–60% 60–70% 70–80%
U.S. Representative before election
Joe Donnelly
Democratic
Elected U.S. Representative
Joe Donnelly
Democratic

This district is centered on South Bend, Indiana and the Indiana portion of the Michiana region. It had been represented by Democrat Joe Donnelly since January 2007.

=== Predictions ===
Source	Ranking	As of
The Cook Political Report	Safe D	November 6, 2008
Rothenberg	Safe D	November 2, 2008
Sabato's Crystal Ball	Safe D	November 6, 2008
Real Clear Politics	Safe D	November 7, 2008
CQ Politics	Safe D	November 6, 2008

=== Polling ===
Source	Date	Joe Donnelly (D)	Luke Puckett (R)
South Bend Tribune/ Research 2000	September 29–30, 2008	53%	35%

=== Results ===
Indiana's 2nd congressional district election, 2008
Party	Candidate	Votes	%
Democratic	Joe Donnelly (incumbent)	187,416	67.09
Republican	Luke Puckett	84,455	30.23
Libertarian	Mark Vogel	7,475	2.68
Total votes		279,346	100.00
Democratic hold			

== District 3 ==
2008 Indiana's 3rd congressional district election
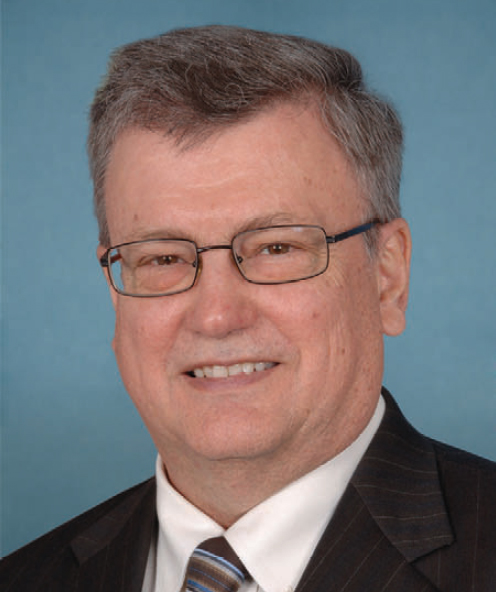

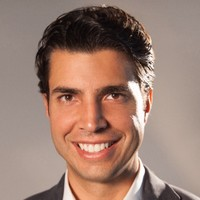

Nominee	Mark Souder	Mike Montagano	William R. Larsen
Party	Republican	Democratic	Libertarian
Popular vote	155,693	112,309	14,877
Percentage	55.0%	39.7%	5.3%
- County results Souder: 50–60% 60–70%
U.S. Representative before election
Mark Souder
Republican
Elected U.S. Representative
Mark Souder
Republican

This district is located in the northeast corner of Indiana and has a large population center in Fort Wayne. Republican Mark Souder represented the district since January 1995 and was challenged by Mike Montagano in 2008. George W. Bush defeated John Kerry in this district 68% to 31%.

=== Polling ===
Source	Date	Democrat: Mike Montagano	Republican: Mark Souder
Howey Gauge	October 23–24, 2008	44%	41%
Research 2000	October 16–18, 2008	40%	45%
Winston Group	October 15–16, 2008	41%	50%
Cooper and Secrest	October 6–7, 2008	39%	44%
Cooper and Secrest	April 24–27, 2008	28%	55%

==== Predictions ====
Source	Ranking	As of
The Cook Political Report	Lean R	November 6, 2008
Rothenberg	Likely R	November 2, 2008
Sabato's Crystal Ball	Lean R	November 6, 2008
Real Clear Politics	Lean R	November 7, 2008
CQ Politics	Lean R	November 6, 2008

=== Results ===
Indiana's 3rd congressional district election, 2008
Party	Candidate	Votes	%
Republican	Mark Souder (incumbent)	155,693	55.04
Democratic	Mike Montagano	112,309	39.70
Libertarian	William R. Larsen	14,877	5.26
Total votes		282,879	100.00
Republican hold			

== District 4 ==
2008 Indiana's 4th congressional district election
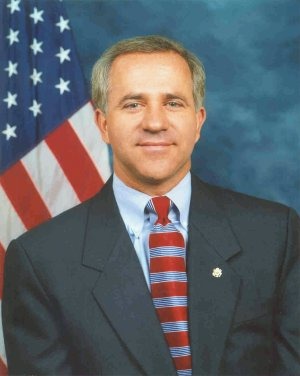

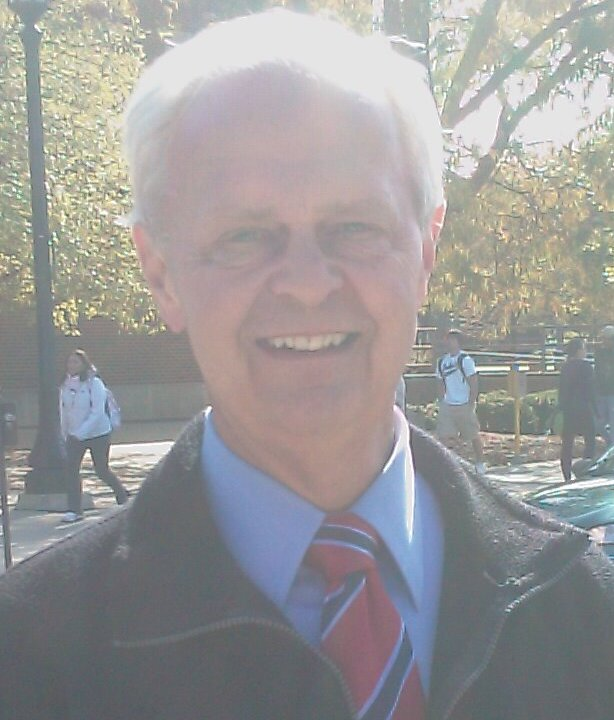
Nominee	Steve Buyer	Nels Ackerson
Party	Republican	Democratic
Popular vote	192,526	129,038
Percentage	59.9%	40.1%
- County results Buyer: 50–60% 60–70% Ackerson: 50–60%
U.S. Representative before election
Steve Buyer
Republican
Elected U.S. Representative
Steve Buyer
Republican

This district is located in west-central Indiana. Located within the district is the city of West Lafayette, Lafayette, Bedford, Monticello, Brownsburg, Plainfield, Zionsville, Lebanon, Frankfort, Greenwood and parts of Indianapolis and many smaller suburban towns. It had been represented by Republican Steve Buyer since January 1993.

=== Polling ===
Source	Date	Democrat: Nels Ackerson	Republican: Steve Buyer
Journal & Courier	September 12–14, 2008	36%	38%

==== Predictions ====
Source	Ranking	As of
The Cook Political Report	Safe R	November 6, 2008
Rothenberg	Safe R	November 2, 2008
Sabato's Crystal Ball	Safe R	November 6, 2008
Real Clear Politics	Safe R	November 7, 2008
CQ Politics	Safe R	November 6, 2008

=== Results ===
Indiana's 4th congressional district election, 2008
Party	Candidate	Votes	%
Republican	Steve Buyer (incumbent)	192,526	59.87
Democratic	Nels Ackerson	129,038	40.13
Total votes		321,564	100.00
Republican hold			

== District 5 ==
2008 Indiana's 5th congressional district election
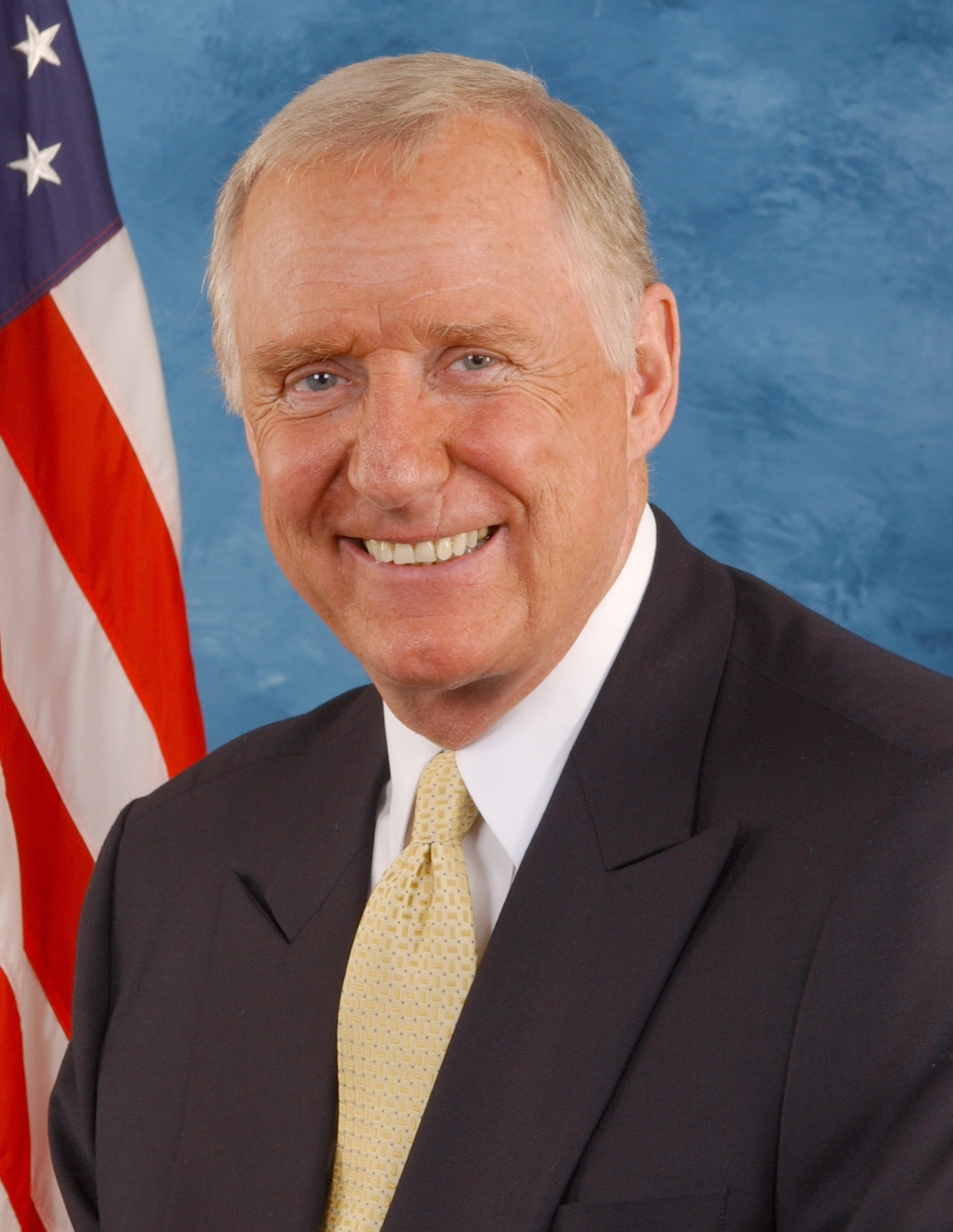

Nominee	Dan Burton	Mary Etta Ruley
Party	Republican	Democratic
Popular vote	234,705	123,357
Percentage	65.5%	34.5%
- County results Burton: 60–70% 70–80%
U.S. Representative before election
Dan Burton
Republican
Elected U.S. Representative
Dan Burton
Republican

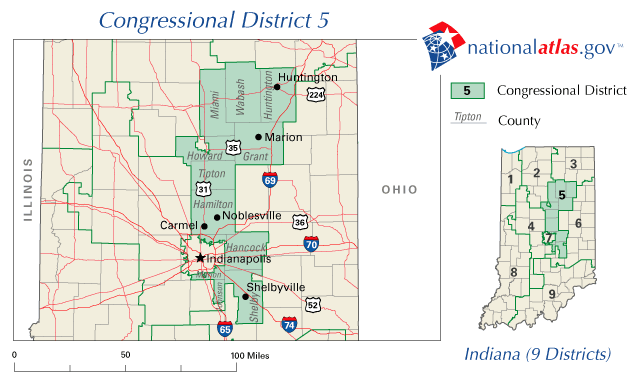

This district located mostly north of Indianapolis is one of the most reliably Republican in America, having voted 71%-28% for George W. Bush in 2004. It was represented by Republican Dan Burton.

=== Predictions ===
Source	Ranking	As of
The Cook Political Report	Safe R	November 6, 2008
Rothenberg	Safe R	November 2, 2008
Sabato's Crystal Ball	Safe R	November 6, 2008
Real Clear Politics	Safe R	November 7, 2008
CQ Politics	Safe R	November 6, 2008

=== Results ===
Indiana's 5th congressional district election, 2008
Party	Candidate	Votes	%
Republican	Dan Burton (incumbent)	234,705	65.55
Democratic	Mary Etta Ruley	123,357	34.45
Total votes		358,062	100.00
Republican hold			

== District 6 ==
2008 Indiana's 6th congressional district election
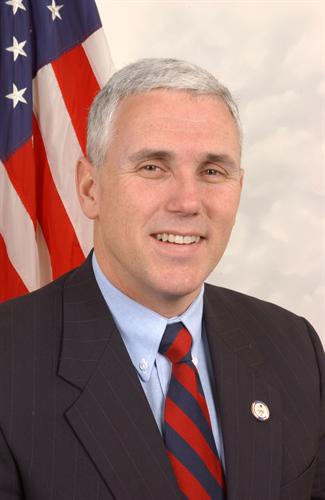

Nominee	Mike Pence	Barry Welsh
Party	Republican	Democratic
Popular vote	180,608	94,265
Percentage	64.0%	33.4%
- County results Pence: 50–60% 60–70% 70–80%
U.S. Representative before election
Mike Pence
Republican
Elected U.S. Representative
Mike Pence
Republican

This district takes in a large portion of eastern Indiana, including the cities of Muncie, Anderson, and Richmond. It was represented by Republican Mike Pence.

=== Predictions ===
Source	Ranking	As of
The Cook Political Report	Safe R	November 6, 2008
Rothenberg	Safe R	November 2, 2008
Sabato's Crystal Ball	Safe R	November 6, 2008
Real Clear Politics	Safe R	November 7, 2008
CQ Politics	Safe R	November 6, 2008

=== Results ===
Indiana's 6th congressional district election, 2008
Party	Candidate	Votes	%
Republican	Mike Pence (incumbent)	180,608	63.95
Democratic	Barry Welsh	94,265	33.38
Libertarian	George T. Holland	7,539	2.67
Total votes		282,412	100.00
Republican hold			

== District 7 ==
2008 Indiana's 7th congressional district election
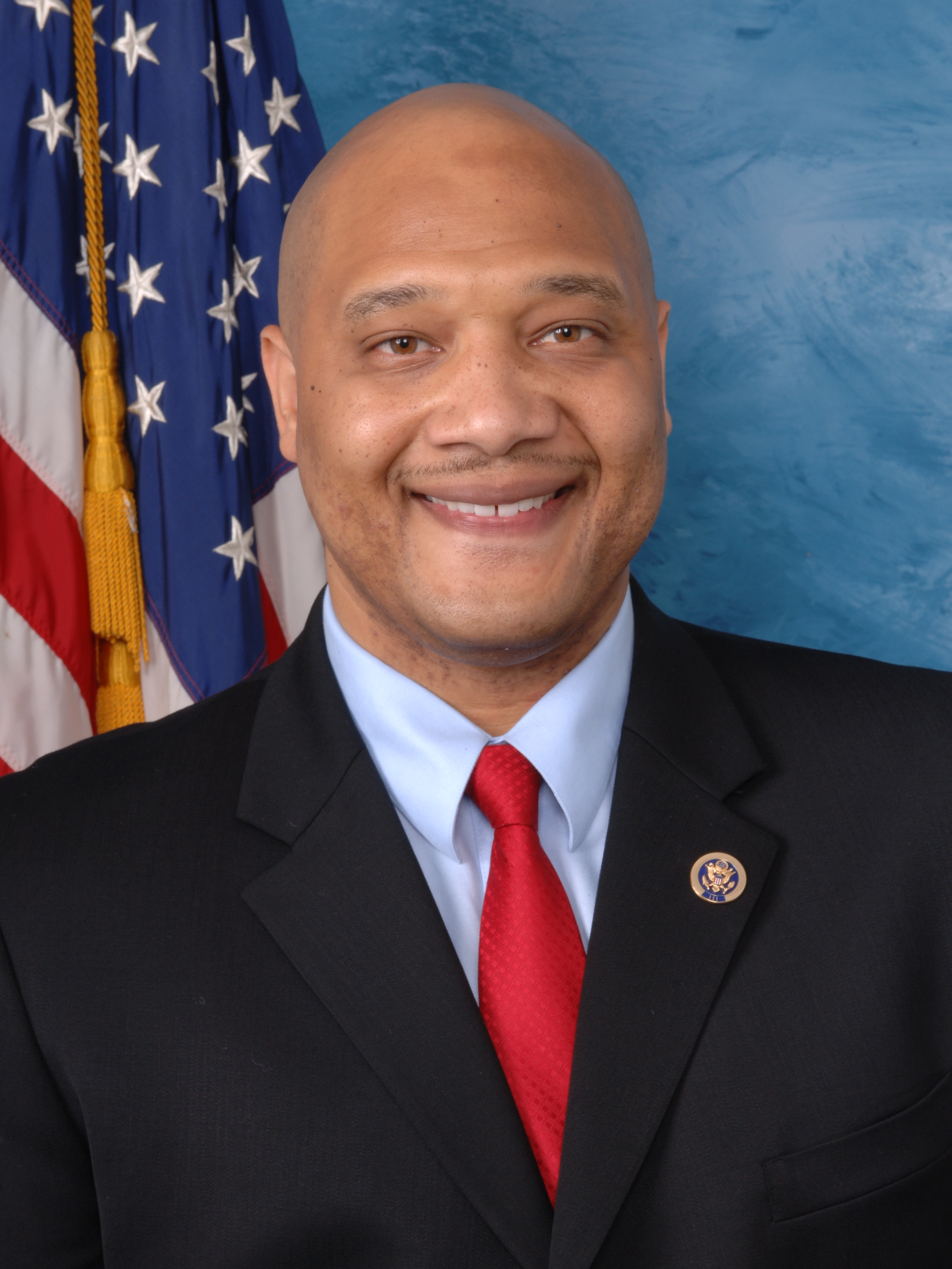

Nominee	André Carson	Gabrielle Campo
Party	Democratic	Republican
Popular vote	172,650	92,645
Percentage	65.1%	34.9%
- County results Carson: 60–70%
U.S. Representative before election
André Carson
Democratic
Elected U.S. Representative
André Carson
Democratic

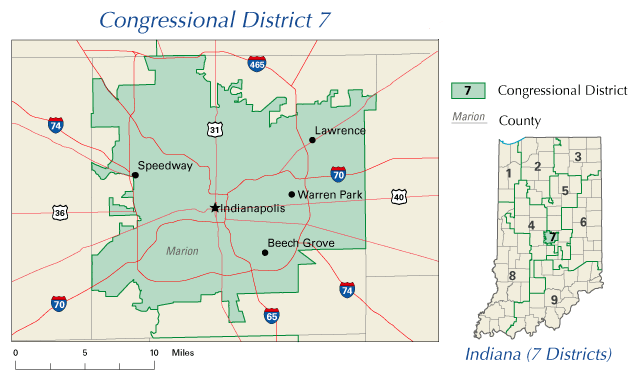

This district is in the heart of Central Indiana and encompasses most of Marion County/Indianapolis. André Carson won the special election to fill this seat and represented Indiana's 7th congressional district since March 13, 2008.

Carson won the primary election with 46%, while Woody Myers received 24%, David Orentlicher received 21%, and Carolene Mays received 8%. Carson and his Republican challenger in the special election, Jon Elrod, were set to face off in the general election but Elrod dropped out. Gabrielle Campo was selected by a party caucus to face the incumbent, Carson. John Kerry defeated George W. Bush in this district 58% to 41% in 2004.

=== Predictions ===
Source	Ranking	As of
The Cook Political Report	Safe D	November 6, 2008
Rothenberg	Safe D	November 2, 2008
Sabato's Crystal Ball	Safe D	November 6, 2008
Real Clear Politics	Safe D	November 7, 2008
CQ Politics	Safe D	November 6, 2008

=== Polling ===
Source	Date	Democrat: André Carson	Republican: Gabrielle Campo
Research 2000/WISH-TV	October 24–28, 2008	53%	38%
Research 2000/WISH-TV	September 29-October 3, 2008	51%	35%

=== Results ===
Indiana's 7th congressional district election, 2008
Party	Candidate	Votes	%
Democratic	André Carson (incumbent)	172,650	65.08
Republican	Gabrielle Campo	92,645	34.92
Write-ins		4	0.00
Total votes		265,299	100.00
Democratic hold			

== District 8 ==
2008 Indiana's 8th congressional district election
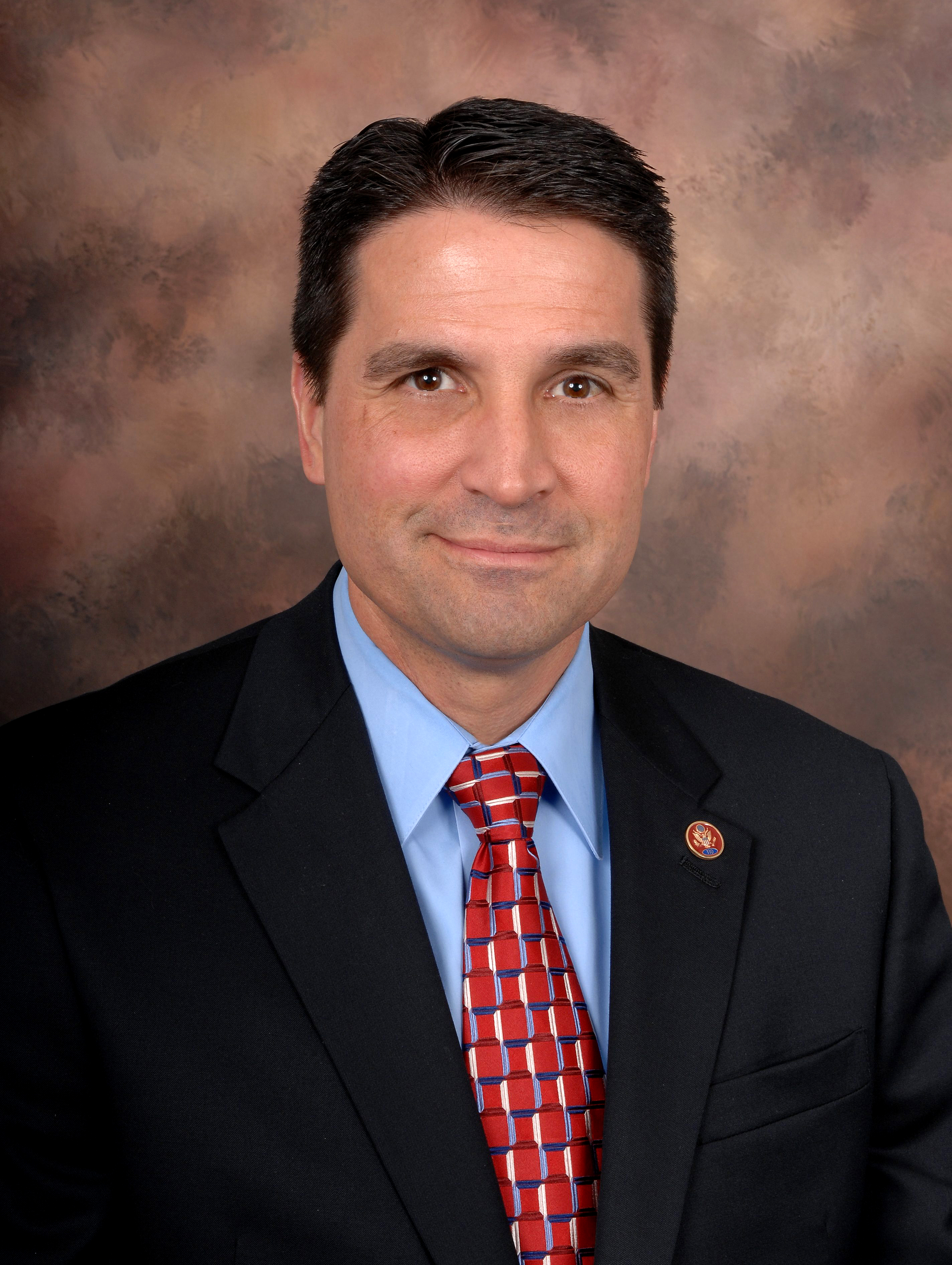

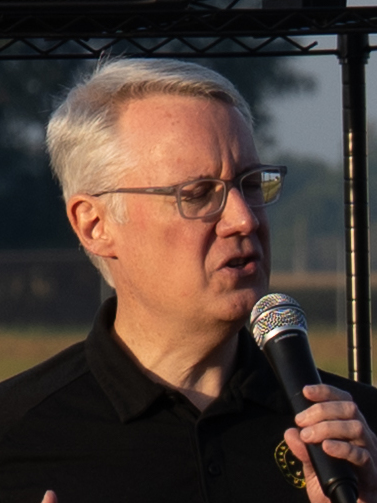
Nominee	Brad Ellsworth	Greg Goode
Party	Democratic	Republican
Popular vote	188,693	102,769
Percentage	64.7%	35.3%
- County results Ellsworth: 50–60% 60–70%
U.S. Representative before election
Brad Ellsworth
Democratic
Elected U.S. Representative
Brad Ellsworth
Democratic

This district has been nicknamed the "Bloody Eighth" because of a series of hard-fought tight campaigns and political reversals. It ousted six incumbents from 1966 to 1982. The election in 1984 was so close that it was decided in Congress. In 2000, a New York Times reporter said of the district: "With a populist streak and a conservative bent, this district does not cotton to country-club Republicans or to social-engineering liberals," and also said "More than 95 percent white and about 41 percent rural, the region shares much of the flavor of the Bible Belt." Evansville and Terre Haute are located within its limits and was represented by Democrat Brad Ellsworth.

=== Predictions ===
Source	Ranking	As of
The Cook Political Report	Safe D	November 6, 2008
Rothenberg	Safe D	November 2, 2008
Sabato's Crystal Ball	Lean D	November 6, 2008
Real Clear Politics	Safe D	November 7, 2008
CQ Politics	Safe D	November 6, 2008

=== Results ===
Indiana's 8th congressional district election, 2008
Party	Candidate	Votes	%
Democratic	Brad Ellsworth (incumbent)	188,693	64.74
Republican	Greg Goode	102,769	35.26
Total votes		291,462	100.00
Democratic hold			

== District 9 ==
2008 Indiana's 9th congressional district election
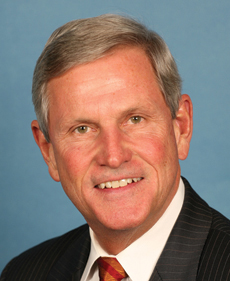

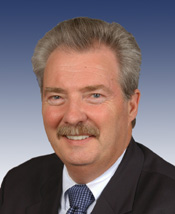
Nominee	Baron Hill	Mike Sodrel
Party	Democratic	Republican
Popular vote	181,281	120,529
Percentage	57.8%	38.4%
- County results Hill: 40–50% 50–60% 60–70% Sodrel: 40–50% 50–60%
U.S. Representative before election
Baron Hill
Democratic
Elected U.S. Representative
Baron Hill
Democratic

This district is located in southeast Indiana. This swing district has been recently fought out by Democrat Baron Hill and Republican Mike Sodrel. Hill beat Sodrel in 2002, Sodrel beat Hill in 2004, and Hill beat Sodrel in 2006 to become the 9th's representative. Hill spent the most on his campaign of those in Indiana, spending $2.2 million. The largest city located within the district is Bloomington followed by Columbus, New Albany, Jeffersonville, and Clarksville which all have Democratic Mayors or Council Presidents.

=== Polling ===
Source	Date	Democrat: Baron Hill	Republican: Mike Sodrel
Survey USA	October 22–23, 2008	54%	39%
Survey USA	October 4–5, 2008	53%	38%
Research 2000/WISH-TV	September 29-October 3, 2008	49%	37%
Survey USA	September 8–10, 2008	50%	39%
Survey USA	July 28–30, 2008	49%	42%
Survey USA	June 16–18, 2008	51%	40%

==== Predictions ====
Source	Ranking	As of
The Cook Political Report	Safe D	November 6, 2008
Rothenberg	Safe D	November 2, 2008
Sabato's Crystal Ball	Lean D	November 6, 2008
Real Clear Politics	Safe D	November 7, 2008
CQ Politics	Likely D	November 6, 2008

=== Results ===
Indiana's 9th congressional district election, 2008
Party	Candidate	Votes	%
Democratic	Baron Hill (incumbent)	181,281	57.77
Republican	Mike Sodrel	120,529	38.41
Libertarian	D. Eric Schansberg	11,994	3.82
Total votes		313,804	100.00
Democratic hold			

== See also ==
- United States House of Representatives elections, 2008
- Indiana gubernatorial election, 2008

Preceded by 2006 elections	United States House elections in Indiana; 2008	Succeeded by 2010 elections
