= Demographics of the 110th United States Congress =

The One Hundred Tenth United States Congress was the meeting of the legislative branch of the United States federal government, between January 3, 2007, and January 3, 2009, during the last two years of the second term of President George W. Bush. It was composed of the Senate and the House of Representatives. The apportionment of seats in the House was based on the 2000 U.S. census.

== Overview ==
In the Senate, there are 16 women, the highest number in history (Barbara Boxer, D-CA; Maria Cantwell, D-WA; Hillary Clinton, D-NY; Susan Collins, R-ME; Elizabeth Dole, R-NC; Dianne Feinstein, D-CA; Kay Bailey Hutchison, R-TX; Amy Klobuchar, D-MN; Mary Landrieu, D-LA; Blanche Lincoln, D-AR; Claire McCaskill, D-MO; Barbara Mikulski, D-MD; Lisa Murkowski, R-AK; Patty Murray, D-WA; Olympia Snowe, R-ME; Debbie Stabenow, D-MI). There are 13 Jews, three Hispanics (Mel Martinez, R-FL; Bob Menendez, D-NJ; Ken Salazar, D-CO) two Asian Americans (Daniel Akaka, D-HI; Daniel Inouye, D-HI), and one Arab American (John Sununu, R-NH). The average age of senators in 2007 is 62 years. The oldest senator in 2007 is President pro tempore Robert Byrd (90); the youngest is John Sununu (44).

The 110th Congress includes the most religiously diverse House in history, including the first Muslims (Keith Ellison, D-MN and André Carson, D-IN), the first Buddhists (Mazie Hirono, D-HI and Hank Johnson, D-GA), 30 Jews, and one atheist (Pete Stark, D-CA). There are 42 African Americans (including two non-voting delegates) and 74 female representatives. There are also 27 Hispanics, four Asian Americans (Mazie Hirono, D-HI; Michael Honda, D-CA; Doris Matsui, D-CA; and David Wu, D-OR), and one Native American (Tom Cole, R-OK). There is one openly gay man (Barney Frank, D-MA) and one lesbian (Tammy Baldwin, D-WI).

== Religious demographics ==
As of June 2008, the top five denominations in the Congress are Roman Catholic (29.3%), Baptist (11.1%), Methodist (10.2%), Jewish (7.8%), and Presbyterian (7.6%). Protestant denominations have held a large majority throughout congressional history, reflecting America's traditional demographics. Members of Protestant denominations currently hold 58.0% of seats. Catholics have also been in Congress from the beginning and have seen continuous representation since then. Charles Carroll was in the Continental Congress and was appointed to the Senate in 1789. Daniel Carroll of Maryland and Thomas Fitzsimons of Pennsylvania were Catholics in the first session of the House of Representatives. Gabriel Richard became the first Catholic priest in Congress in 1823. Quakers have also served in Congress since its inception, with Philemon Dickinson in the Senate and a pair of House members in Lambert Cadwalader and John Hathorn. Quaker representation has not been continuous, and only one member of the current Congress belongs to the group, Representative Rush Holt.

In 1844, Lewis Charles Levin became the first Jew to be elected to Congress. In 1845, David Levy Yulee was chosen as the first Jewish member of the Senate, although he later became a convert to Christianity. Jews have been continuously represented in the House since the election of Isidor Rayner in 1887. Since the election of Herbert Lehman to the Senate in 1948, the upper house has also contained at least one Jewish member. A record 42 Jews currently serve in Congress.

Not until 1966 was a member of an Orthodox faith elected to Congress. Nick Galifianakis became the first member of this group to serve in the legislature. In 1977, Paul Sarbanes became the first US Senator of Orthodox beliefs. Despite having a relatively small number of adherents, this group has been continuously represented in both houses since the initial elections. Senator Olympia Snowe, as well as Representatives John Sarbanes, Zack Space, Gus Bilirakis, and Niki Tsongas are current members of Congress that follow Greek Orthodoxy, while Representative Melissa Bean adheres to Serbian Orthodoxy.

Dalip Singh Saund, who was elected in 1956 and served until 1963, was the first, and so far only, Sikh in Congress. In 2007, Keith Ellison of Minnesota became the first practicing Muslim to become a member of the United States Congress; he was joined by André Carson of Indiana following a special election on March 11, 2008. Mazie Hirono of Hawaii and Hank Johnson of Georgia became the first two Buddhists to be elected to the United States Congress on November 7, 2006. Johnson is a member of the Soka Gakkai sect, and Hirono (albeit nonpracticing) is a member of the Jodo Shinshu sect.

Members of the Church of Jesus Christ of Latter-day Saints (Mormons) have been in Congress since Utah was established as a territory in 1851. Delegate John Milton Bernhisel became the first Mormon in Congress that same year. When Utah received statehood in 1896, Clarence Emir Allen became the first representative of a state that practiced the Mormon faith, and since then Mormons have had continuous representation in the Lower House. Frank J. Cannon became the first Latter-day Saint member of the Senate, also in 1896. However, after he left office the next year, Mormons did not return to the Senate until 1905, when George Sutherland started a string of continuous representation for the group. Currently, eleven representatives and five senators are part of this religious group.

As of a statement in March 2007, California Rep. Pete Stark became the only publicly stated atheist in the history of Congress. He was formerly of the Unitarian Universalist faith. Numerous members of Congress throughout history have also declined to list an official religion, including 10 current representatives.

== Gender ==
As of 2007, 477 members of Congress are male (84%) and 88 are female (16%). The global average for female representation at the parliamentary level in 2007 was 17.0%.

Jeannette Rankin was the first woman elected to Congress, in 1916. Women could not vote or be elected in most of the United States until the Nineteenth Amendment was ratified in 1920. Rebecca Felton was the first woman to become a Senator in 1922, serving for a brief two-day period when she was appointed to fill a vacancy left by Georgia Senator Thomas E. Watson. The first woman to win a race for Senate was Hattie Caraway, who won a special election in January 1932 to fulfill her late husband's Senate term of office. Caraway subsequently won the scheduled November 1932 election, eventually serving two more full terms.

In the early days following the legalization of national women's suffrage, most women elected to Congress were chosen as replacements for deceased husbands. Prior to the 1960s, most female members of Congress were either involved in this process of "widow's succession" or were members of influential political families. Elected to the House in 1965, Patsy Mink became the first non-white woman to enter Congress (she is of Japanese American heritage). Until 1992, a year that saw the election of four new female senators, the US Senate had never had more than three women serving at a time. Nancy Pelosi became the first female leader of a major party when she took over the position of House Minority Leader in 2002, and she is currently (since 2007) the first woman to serve as Speaker of the House.

In the 109th United States Congress, there were 70 women serving the U.S. House and 14 in the U.S. Senate, which was the highest number of women to hold Congressional office in the United States up until that time. Those numbers went up in the 110th Congress, with 74 women in the House and 16 in the Senate.

== Sexual orientation ==
There have been five openly gay members in the history of Congress. Gerry Studds (elected in 1972) became the first openly gay man when he acknowledged his homosexuality in 1983. Barney Frank (elected in 1980) is currently the only openly gay male in Congress; he first spoke publicly about his sexual orientation in 1987. Steve Gunderson, elected in 1980 and outed in 1994, and Jim Kolbe, elected in 1984 and outed in 1996, are two other previous members of Congress that were openly gay. Current congresswoman Tammy Baldwin is the first and so far only open lesbian to win election to Congress. In 1998, she became the first gay person to win election to Congress as a non-incumbent. Former California representative Michael Huffington is bisexual, but did not come out until after his term had ended.

== Occupational background ==
Members of Congress come from a variety of occupational backgrounds. 215 members (159 in the House and 58 in the Senate) have worked in some aspect of law during their career, whether as an attorney, paralegal, policy analyst, or bureaucratic official, with 180 members of the House and 58 of the Senate holding Juris Doctor degrees. 189 members (162 in the House and 26 in the Senate) have worked in some segment of private sector business, with 18 members holding MBA degrees. 82 representatives and 14 senators have worked in education as a teacher or school administrator. 109 Congress members have served as political aides at some level, including 10 working as congressional pages and 16 working as members of the White House staff.

24 members of Congress have worked in the medical field, including 12 M.D.s, 3 nurses, 2 dentists, 2 veterinarians, 1 psychologist, 1 psychiatrist, 1 optometrist, and 1 pharmacist. 15 members are former law enforcement specialists, including 5 sheriffs, 4 police officers, 2 state troopers, 2 probation officers, 1 FBI agent, and 1 border patrol agent. 9 scientists serve in Congress, including 4 chemists, 3 physicists, 1 biologist, and 1 biomedical engineer. 6 members of Congress are ordained ministers, while 5 are certified public accountants.

Several members of Congress were nationally famous prior to entering politics, namely Hall of Fame MLB pitcher Jim Bunning, and NFL quarterback Heath Shuler. Other congressmen have held a variety of jobs ranging from social worker to mortician to riverboat captain.

== Race/ethnicity ==
African Americans currently make up about 13% of the US population but have historically been underrepresented in Congress. There currently are 52 African-American representatives (12%) and two African-American delegates in the United States House of Representatives, representing 26 states, plus the U.S. Virgin Islands and the District of Columbia. Senators Tim Scott, Cory Booker, and Kamala Harris are the only current black senate members (3%). Until the emancipation of enslaved African Americans after the Civil War and the passage of the Civil Rights Act of 1866, blacks were generally barred from voting outside of the Northeast and in the South, particularly. As a result of these new laws, Joseph Rainey and Jefferson F. Long won election to Congress in majority-black districts and Hiram Rhodes Revels was appointed as senator from Mississippi (then a majority-black state) in 1870. However, the end of Reconstruction in 1876 marked a weakening of black rights and by 1901, when George Henry White left the House after losing a reelection bid, there were no African Americans left in Congress.

In 1929, Oscar Stanton de Priest became the first African American congressman since George Henry White. He and his successor, Arthur W. Mitchell, spent their tenure as the only African Americans in Congress while representing a majority-black House district in Chicago. In 1970, a year that saw the election of four black freshman congressmen, black membership in the House reached double-digits. Shirley Chisholm became the first African American female member of Congress when she won a 1968 election in New York, while Andrew Young of Georgia became the first modern African American congressman from the South after he won election in 1972.

Only 10 African Americans have served in the U.S. Senate. Hiram Revels and Blanche Bruce both served during Reconstruction in then majority-black Mississippi. In the modern era, Edward Brooke (served 1967–79), Carol Moseley Braun (served 1993–99 as the first black female senator), Barack Obama (served 2005–08), Rolan Burris, Cory Booker, Tim Scott, Mo Cowan (2013), and Kamala Harris (2017–present) are the only blacks to have served in the upper house.

Representation of Hispanics is somewhat complex, particularly because of the different ways to define membership in this group. Hispanics represent over 14% of the U.S. population, while the Senate is 3% Hispanic and the House is approximately 5% (25 members) Hispanic. Hispanics make up only 4% of American voters, so Hispanic political incorporation has been relatively high compared with previous immigrant groups. The Congressional Hispanic Caucus has 21 members. Joseph Marion Hernández, a Spanish American, was the first Hispanic in Congress. He was a Whig Party territorial representative for Florida in 1822. The first to represent a state was Romualdo Pacheco, who represented California in 1877. In 1929, Octaviano Ambrosio Larrazolo became the first Hispanic to be elected to the United States Senate. Ileana Ros-Lehtinen, a Cuban American first elected in 1989, was the first Hispanic woman in Congress. While Hispanic women have served in House, none have been elected to the Senate.

Unlike black Americans, Hispanics never were legally barred from the polls, and in New Mexico and California, Hispanics were a large and influential minority. Since the election of Dennis Chavez and Joachim O. Fernández to the House in 1931, Hispanics have continuously been represented in Congress. Most Hispanic members of Congress, including all elected prior to 1970, were of Mexican descent. Herman Badillo won election in 1970 to become the first Puerto Rican in Congress, Ileana Ros-Lehtinen was elected in 1989 as the first Cuban American congresswoman, and Richard Pombo won a seat in 1993 as the first Portuguese American member of congress.

Prior to 2005, only three Hispanics won a term in the U.S. Senate. These members were Octaviano Larrazola (served 1928–29), Dennis Chavez (formerly of the House, and served 1935–62), and Joseph Montoya (also formerly a House member, served 1964–77), all of Mexican descent. However, two Hispanics won Senate seats in 2004, Ken Salazar and Mel Martinez (the first Cuban American senator), and Bob Menendez was appointed and subsequently elected in 2006.

Asian Americans and Pacific Islanders also have a high level of political incorporation regarding their actual voting population. But, as a result of this group's historically low voting rates, overall political incorporation of the general population is relatively low. Although the population of this group has increased in size by 600% in 30 years due to immigration, heavy naturalization and voter outreach efforts have provided this primarily foreign-born community with less than 1% of voters but 1.25% of the congressional population. However, since they represent 4.4% of the total population in the United States, this 1.25% still represents less than one-third of the total Asian American and Pacific Islander population. There are six members of this group in the House and two in the Senate. Senator Daniel Inouye and Representatives Mike Honda, Doris Matsui, and Mazie Hirono are all Japanese Americans. Senator Daniel Akaka is a Native Hawaiian, while Delegate Eni Faleomavaega is a Samoan. Bobby Scott of Virginia, who is also half-black, has Filipino American ancestry.

Robert William Wilcox, a Native Hawaiian who served as Hawaiian territorial delegate from 1900 to 1903, was the first Pacific Islander chosen to serve in Congress. Dalip Singh Saund (served 1957–63) was the first South Asian American in Congress and is one of only two Indian Americans to be elected to the legislature. Hiram Fong, who served three decades in the Senate from 1959 to 1977, remains the sole Chinese American member to have ever entered Congress. Daniel Inouye (serving since 1959) was the first Japanese American in the House and later the first in Senate. Patsy Mink (served 1965-77 and again from 1990 to 2002) was the first Asian American woman in Congress. Daniel Akaka (serving since 1977) is thus far the only native Hawaiian to serve in either the House or the Senate. Jay Kim, who was born in Seoul and served from 1993 to 1999, remains as the only Korean American to have entered Congress, while current congressman David Wu became the first Taiwanese American representative in 1999. Bobby Scott, elected in 1993, is the only member of Congress to have Filipino ancestry.

Only five members of the U.S. Senate have been of Asian American or Pacific Islander backgrounds. Four of these politicians have been from Hawaii, with senators Hiram Fong, Spark Matsunaga, and Daniel Akaka providing a continuous hold for this ethnic group on a Class I seat from that state since its inception. Daniel Inouye has held the state's other Senate seat for all but four years of statehood. Samuel Hayakawa (in office 1977–83) of California is the only other Asian to have served in the upper house. Hayakawa is actually of Japanese Canadian descent, but worked as a college professor in the United States.

Jewish Americans (29 members of the House and 13 members of the Senate) have a level of political incorporation that is much greater than their voting population would suggest (2% of the population).

Compared with the primarily European American, African American, Latino, and Asian/Pacific American communities, American Indians, comprising 1.5% of the population, are the most underrepresented group. Tom Cole, Markwayne Mullin, Sharice Davids, and Deb Haaland were the only registered American Indians in the House during the 110th Congress. Tracking Native American members of Congress is complex, since many people of mixed blood are not registered as part of the American Indian population. Charles Curtis, who was three-quarters Native American and had ancestries from various tribes, was elected in 1892 as the first U.S. representative from this group. Curtis accomplished several other firsts during his political tenure. He became the first American Indian to serve in the US Senate (in office 1907-13 and 1915–29), to lead a major party (served as Republican Senate Majority Leader from 1925 to 1929), and to obtain the office of Vice President.

Several of the nation's major tribes have been represented in Congress in limited numbers. Charles David Carter (served 1907–27) was the first Choctaw in Congress; William Wirt Hastings (served 1915–35) was the first Cherokee in the legislature; Ben Reifel (served 1961–71) was the first Sioux to win election to the body. Other than Curtis, only a few members of the U.S. Senate have been American Indians. Robert Latham Owen (served 1907–25) and Ben Nighthorse Campbell (served 1993–2005 after several previous terms in the House and the first Cheyenne in Congress) are the others to have earned that distinction.

Middle Eastern Americans also have typically low levels of voting incorporation, except among a particular voting group. As a whole, Middle Eastern Americans are not measured by the U.S. Census, which, combined with differences in the definition of this group, makes measuring its population percentage difficult. Estimates place about 1.8% of the nation's population to be of this origin. However, nearly all Middle Eastern members of Congress have been from one group, Lebanese Americans. George Kasem became the first Lebanese congressman when he won his only term in 1958. Since Abraham Kazen took office in 1977 (served until 1985), Lebanese Americans have been consistently represented in Congress. Currently, there are four Lebanese members of the House: Nick Rahall, Ray LaHood, Charles Boustany, and Darrell Issa.

Five members of the U.S. Senate have been of Middle Eastern descent, with all five coming from Arab American backgrounds and four holding Lebanese descent. James Abourezk, who served from 1973 to 1979, became the first Lebanese American member of the upper house. George Mitchell (served 1980–95), who is half Lebanese, became the first Middle Eastern American party leader, as he served as Senate Majority Leader from 1989 to 1995. James Abdnor (served 1981 to 1987) and Spencer Abraham (1995–2001) also were Lebanese American senators. John Sununu, a senator since 2003, is the first member of Congress of Palestinian American descent.

Currently, there is one foreign-born U.S. Senator, Mel Martínez of Florida, who was born in Cuba. There are seven current representatives who were born overseas: Lincoln Díaz-Balart, Ileana Ros-Lehtinen, and Albio Sires from Cuba; Ciro Rodriguez from Mexico; Mazie Hirono from Japan; David Wu from Taiwan; and Pete Hoekstra from the Netherlands, who in total comprise 1.6% of the House. This figure does not include three members who were born overseas to U.S. citizen parents.
