= Frank J. Anderson =

American politician and sheriff (1938–2022)

Sheriff of Marion County, Indiana
- In office 2003–2011
- Preceded by: Jack Cottey
- Succeeded by: John R. Layton

Personal details
- Born: 1938
- Died: April 30, 2022 (aged 83–84)

Frank J. Anderson (1938 – April 30, 2022) was an American politician who served as Sheriff of Marion County, Indiana, from 2003 until 2011. He was the first black person to serve in that post and the second black Sheriff in Indiana after Oatess E. Archey, who was elected sheriff of Grant County, Indiana in 1998 and re-elected to another four-year term in 2002.

== Early life and career ==
Frank Anderson grew up in Indianapolis, Indiana. While a student at Shortridge High School, he was a member of the wrestling team, and was inducted into the IHSWCA Hall of Fame in 1990. Following graduation from high school in 1956, he enlisted in the United States Navy Shore Patrol, serving until 1959.

From 1961 to 1965, he served as a Patrol Deputy in the Marion County Sheriff's Office. From 1965 to 1977, he served in the United States Marshals Service, serving first as a Deputy Marshal, and later as an inspector and security specialist.

During his tenure with the U.S. Marshals Service, he helped create and later directed the Federal Witness Protection Program. In 1977, he was appointed U.S. Marshal for the Southern District of Indiana, becoming the top federal law enforcement official for over half the state, serving in that post until 1981.

Following a brief stint in the private sector, he was appointed a District Director for the Federal Protective Service, where he was in charge of providing security in federal facilities in Indiana, Minnesota, and parts of Illinois and Wisconsin from 1983 to 1994. He was reappointed as U.S. Marshal for the Southern District of Indiana, serving from 1994 to 2001. In that capacity, he oversaw the federal government seizure of the Indianapolis Baptist Temple, winning praise for his peaceful handling of the standoff, and oversaw the execution of Oklahoma City bomber Timothy McVeigh at the federal prison in Terre Haute, Indiana.

== Marion County Sheriff ==
Anderson was elected as Marion County's first black Sheriff in 2002, and reelected in 2006. Following his reelection as Sheriff, his duties were expanded to include oversight of the Indianapolis Metropolitan Police Department in accordance with legislation signed by Indianapolis Mayor Bart Peterson. Following Peterson's defeat for reelection in November, 2007, the new mayor, Greg Ballard announced that he would fulfill a campaign promise to remove the Sheriff as statutory head of the Police Department and put it under the Mayor's authority within the Department of Public Safety. Following implementation of Ballard's proposal in February, 2008, Anderson's role as Sheriff was reduced to administration of the county jail, overseeing security for City-County government buildings, and administrative duties including tax collection and serving legal papers, with general law enforcement services for the County remaining under the jurisdiction of the Indianapolis Metropolitan Police Department which resulted in Anderson becoming the only Sheriff in the state of Indiana without any territory to protect.

=== Salary controversy ===
Sheriff Anderson's annual compensation was more than that of the Governor of Indiana or the Mayor of Indianapolis. Sheriff Anderson turned down a $50,000 per year raise when he came under public scrutiny after an Indianapolis Star article detailed his 2005 annual base pay as $102,000 in addition to $268,000 from a portion of fees collected from tax warrants, for total compensation of $370,000, nearly that of the President of the United States.

== Subsequent political career ==
Anderson was mentioned as a possible candidate in the 2008 special election in Indiana's 7th congressional district following the death of then-incumbent Julia Carson, but ultimately declined to run, and endorsed André Carson who went on to win the election.

On June 8, 2010, he announced that he would not seek reelection as Marion County Sheriff, but would seek the Democratic Party nomination for the 31st District seat in the Indiana State Senate. The seat had been held by Republican James W. Merritt since 1990. Merritt defeated Anderson by a margin of 52% to 44% in the 2010 general election.

Following his defeat in the 2010 Indiana State Senate election, he was retained as a paid consultant for his successor as Marion County Sheriff, John R. Layton.

He died on April 30, 2022.
