= Mary Ann Sullivan =

American politician

Member of the Indiana House of Representatives from the 97th district
- In office November 18, 2008 – November 20, 2012
- Preceded by: Jon Elrod
- Succeeded by: Justin Moed

Personal details
- Born: 1959 (age 66–67) Indianapolis, Indiana
- Party: Democratic
- Spouse: Brian Sullivan
- Education: Indiana University-Purdue University Indianapolis

Mary Ann Sullivan is a former Democratic member of the Indiana House of Representatives, representing the 97th District from 2008 to 2012. Sullivan announced she would not run for another term for the House, instead opting to run for the Indiana State Senate and pose a challenge to incumbent Republican Senator Brent Waltz. After running unopposed in the Democratic primary, Sullivan ultimately lost in the general election to Waltz. She was then succeeded by Representative Justin Moed.
