= Justin Moed =

American politician from Indiana

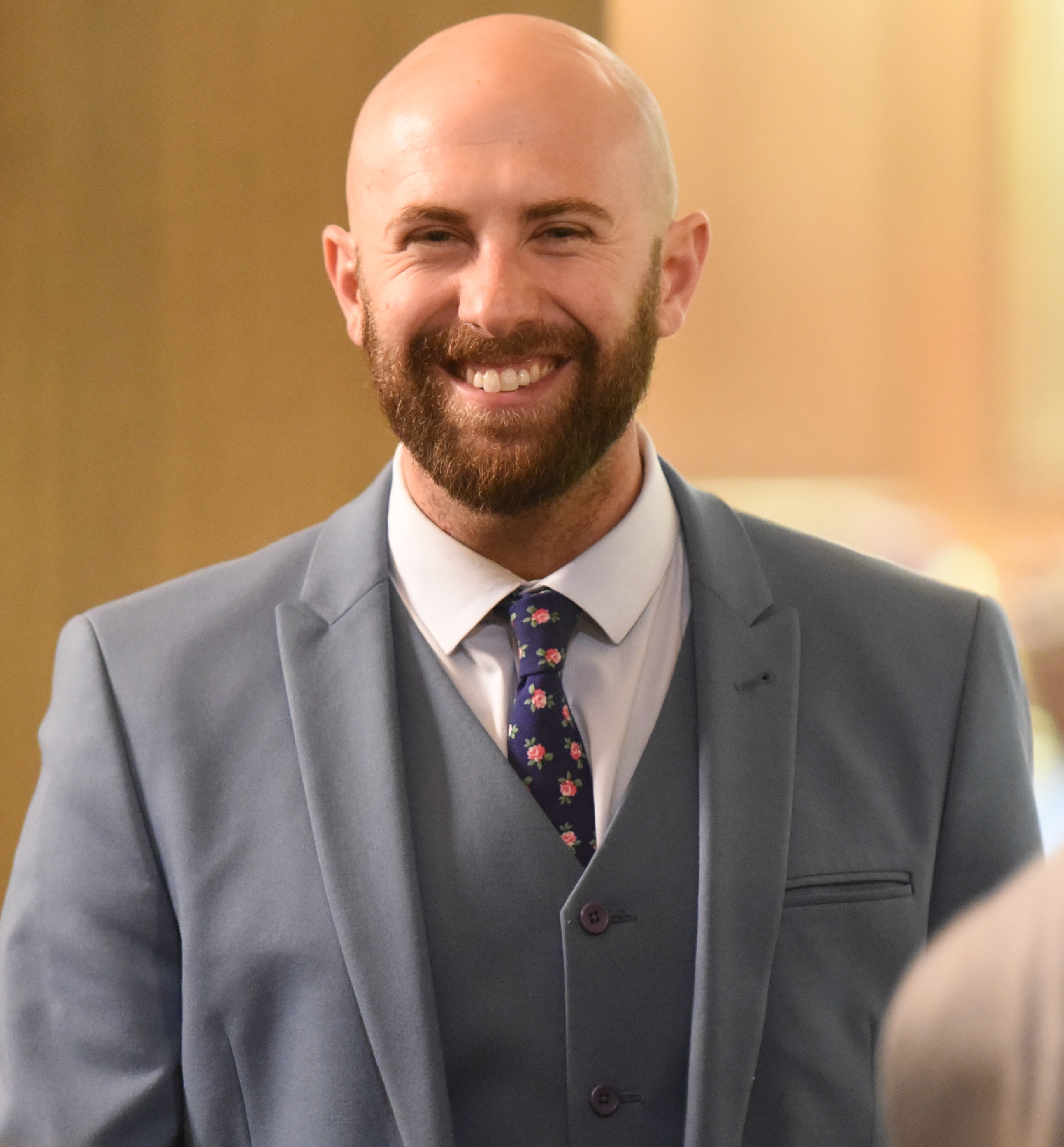

Minority Whip of the Indiana House of Representatives
- Incumbent
- Assumed office November 6, 2024

Member of the Indiana House of Representatives from the 97th district
- Incumbent
- Assumed office 2013
- Preceded by: Mary Ann Sullivan

Personal details
- Born: 1983 or 1984 (age 41–42)
- Party: Democratic
- Education: Butler University
- Occupation: Politician

Justin Moed (born 1983/1984) is a Democratic member of the Indiana House of Representatives, representing the 97th district since 2013.

Moed earned his bachelor's degree from Butler University, then worked as doorkeeper for the Indiana House of Representatives. He worked up to senior policy analyst, then decided to run for office.

== Early life and education ==
Moed graduated from Butler University in Indianapolis in 2006.

== Legislative career ==
Justin Moed serves as the Democratic Whip in the Indiana House of Representatives. He is the ranking minority member of the Public Policy Committee. Moed is a member of the Agriculture and Rural Development committee, as well as the Local Government committee.

Justin Moed has served as the representative for the citizens of Indiana's 97th district since 2013. Democrats have been in the minority for the duration of his time in office, so Moed had to work across party lines to deliver results for his constituents.

=== Key Votes ===
On August 5, 2022, Moed voted against SB1, which Prohibits All Abortions Unless Under Certain Circumstances. The bill passed the House 62–38. Governor Eric Holcomb signed the bill into law on August 5, 2022.

On April 24, 2019, Moed voted to Authorize Sports Betting for the State of Indiana (HB 1015).

On January 13, 2016, Moed Co-Sponsored the bill to Repeal ISTEP Program for Indiana public schools (HB 1395).

On February 27, 2014, Moed voted to repeal Common Core Standards for Indiana public schools.

On February 25, 2014, Moed voted to Authorize the Sale of Alcohol at the Indiana State Fair (SB 339).

==== Civil Liberties ====
On January 26, 2022, Moed voted against HB 1134, which Prohibits Teaching Certain Concepts on Race, Gender, and Ethnicity.

On February 22, 2021, Moed voted against HB 1369, a bill to Authorize Carrying a Firearm Without Permit.

On March 7, 2016, Moed voted to Authorize Liquor Licenses for State Parks (HB 1386).

On January 28, 2014, Moed voted against HJR 3, a joint resolution which Defines Marriage as Between 1 Man and 1 Woman.

On February 25, 2013, Moed voted to Require Drug Testing for Certain Welfare Recipients (HB 1483).

==== Criminal Justice ====
On February 22, 2021, Moed voted to Establish a Defense for a Person who Operates a Vehicle with Marijuana in Their Metabolism (HB 1028).

On January 7, 2021, Moed Co-Sponsored HB 1006, a bill to increase Police Accountability.

On April 22, 2019, Moed voted to Expand "Stand Your Ground" Laws (HB 1284).

On February 14, 2019, Moed voted to Increase Penalties for Animal Abuse (HB 1615).

On January 26, 2016, Moed voted against HB 1019, a bill that Limits Public Access to Police Body Camera Footage.

==== Education ====
On May 24, 2022, Moed voted against HB 1041, a bill to Prohibit Transgender Girls from Playing on Female Sports Teams.

On March 11, 2020, Moed voted against HB 1065, a bill that Authorizes School Districts to Use Tax Dollars for Charter Schools.

On April 2, 2019, Moed voted to Authorize Academic Credit for Religious Education Courses (SB 373).

On February 18, 2019, Moed voted to Authorize Firearm Training for Teachers and School Staff (HB 1253).

On January 7, 2014, Moed Co-Sponsored HB 1004, a bill that Establishes Preschool Scholarship System for Certain Individuals.

On April 15, 2013, Moed voted to Authorize Certain Undocumented Students to Receive In-State Tuition (SB 207).

==== Election Integrity ====
On January 31, 2022, Moed voted against HB 1116, a bill to Increase Requirements for Mail-In Voting.

==== Environment ====
On January 14, 2021, Moed Co-Sponsored HB 1381, a bill to Establish Standards for Assessing Solar Projects.

On March 3, 2020, Moed voted against SB 229, a bill to Remove State Oversight of Certain Drains near Wetlands.

On January 28, 2014, Moed voted against HB 1143, a bill that Prohibits State Environmental Regulations from Exceeding EPA Regulations.

==== Healthcare ====
On August 5, 2022, Moed voted to Appropriate Funds for Pregnancy and Child Care (SB 2).

On May 10, 2021, Moed voted against SB 5, a bill that Prohibits a Local Health Department from Implementing Orders More Restrictive than the Governor.

On March 11, 2020, Moed voted to Require Healthcare Providers Give "Good Faith" Estimates of Medical Costs.

On January 23, 2018, Moed voted to Require Dissemination of Vaccine Information.

==== Transportation ====
On March 13, 2014, Moed voted to Authorize Funding for a Mass Transit System (SB 176).

On February 25, 2013, Moed voted to Authorize a Metropolitan Transit District for the City of Indianapolis.

== Controversy ==
In March 2015, Moed was caught in a sexting scandal with adult film actress Sydney Leathers. Moed sent Leathers money and a series of gifts, and revealed a series of explicit fantasies and stories of his own sexual history. Leathers herself first became famous for her sexting affair with former Congressman Anthony Weiner. Moed later apologized.

== Electoral history ==
Indiana State House District 97 election, 2012
Party	Candidate	Votes	%	±%
Democratic	Justin Moed	8,325	58.3%	+0.63%
Republican	AJ Feeney-Ruiz	5,961	41.7%	−0.63%
Total votes		14,286	100.00%	

Indiana State House District 97 election, 2014
Party	Candidate	Votes	%	±%
Democratic	Justin Moed (incumbent)	3,689	100%	+41.7%
Total votes		3,689	100.00%	

Indiana State House District 97 election, 2016
Party	Candidate	Votes	%	±%
Democratic	Justin Moed (incumbent)	9,834	60.95%	−39.05%
Republican	Dale Nye	6,300	39.05%	+39.05%
Total votes		16,134	100.00%	

Indiana State House District 97 election, 2018
Party	Candidate	Votes	%	±%
Democratic	Justin Moed (incumbent)	8,635	100%	+39.05%
Total votes		8,635	100.00%	

Indiana State House District 97 election, 2020
Party	Candidate	Votes	%	±%
Democratic	Justin Moed (incumbent)	9,707	55.5%	−44.5%
Republican	John Schmitz	6,962	39.8	+39.8%
Libertarian	Mark Renholzberger	816	4.7%	+4.7%
Total votes		17,485	100.00%	

Indiana State House District 97 election, 2022
Party	Candidate	Votes	%	±%
Democratic	Justin Moed (incumbent)	5,103	58.8%	+3.3%
Republican	John Schmitz	3,333	38.4	−1.4%
Libertarian	Edgar Amaro Villegas	238	2.7%	−2.0%
Total votes		8,674	100.00%	

Indiana State House District 97 Democratic Primary election, 2024
Party	Candidate	Votes	%	±%
Democratic	Justin Moed (incumbent)	968	76.3%	−23.7%
Democratic	Sarah Shydale	300	23.7	+23.7%
Total votes		1,268	100.00%	

Indiana State House District 97 election, 2024
Party	Candidate	Votes	%	±%
Democratic	Justin Moed (incumbent)	8,822	58.2%	−0.6%
Republican	Stephen Whitmer	5,900	38.9	+0.5%
Libertarian	Mark Renholzberger	429	2.8%	+0.1%
Total votes		15,151	100.00%	

== Personal life ==
Justin Moed graduated from Butler University in 2006. He started as a doorkeeper for the Indiana House of Representatives, then was Assistant Policy Director, and later served as Senior Policy Analyst.

Moed is a homeowner in Garfield Park, where he owns and manages an urban farm. He is also involved with numerous neighborhood organizations. Moed serves as a member of the Indiana State Tourism Council, the White River Park Commission, and on the Board of Advisors for Indiana University - Indianapolis.
