= Indianapolis Recorder =

African American newspaper in Indiana, US

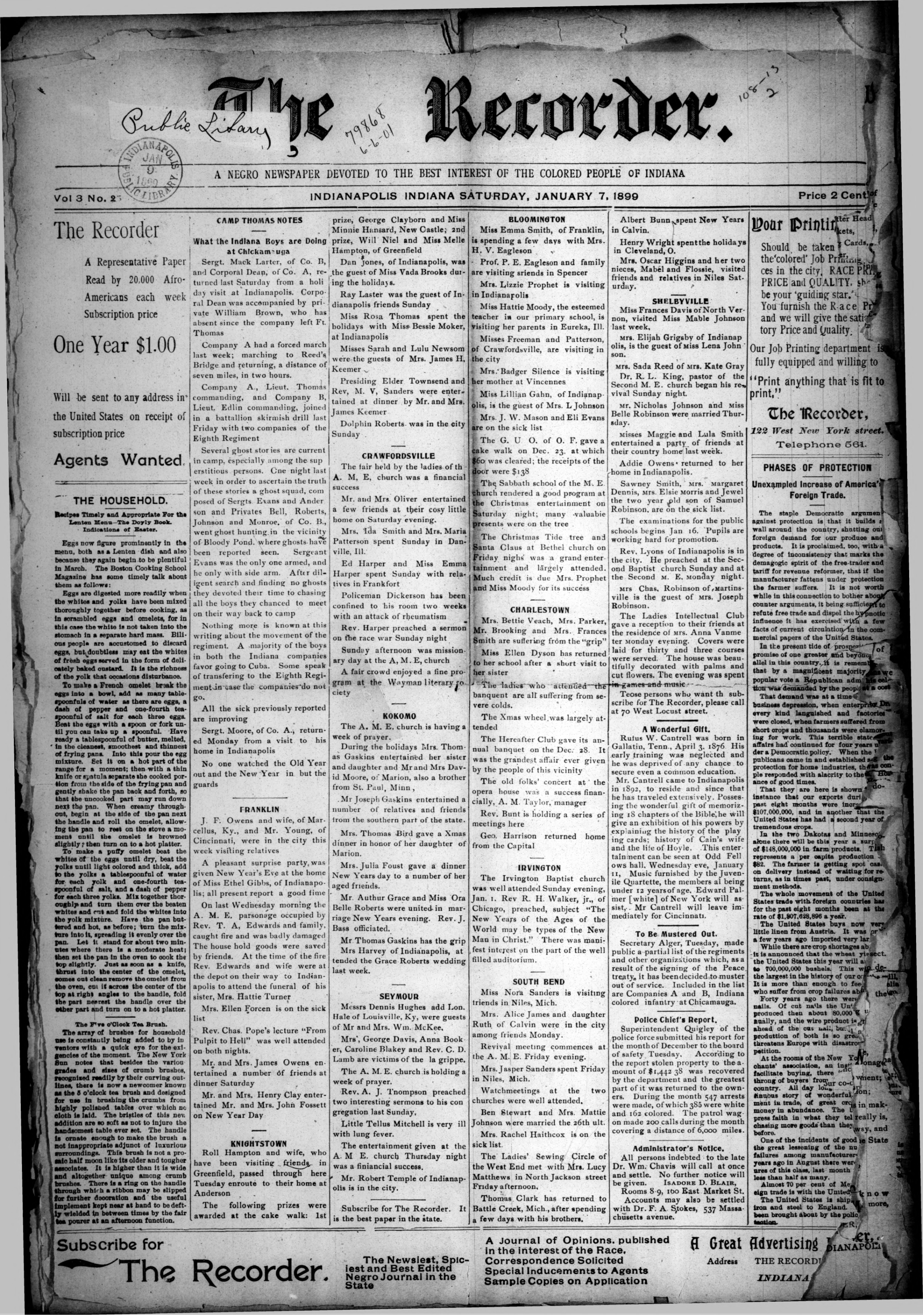
- The front page of the Recorder in 1899
- Type: Weekly newspaper
- Format: Broadsheet
- Owner: Recorder Media Group (RMG)
- Founder(s): George P. Stewart and Will Porter
- Publisher: William G. Mays
- President: Robert Shegog
- Founded: 1895
- Headquarters: 2901 N. Tacoma Ave. Indianapolis, Indiana 46218
- Circulation: 100,000
- ISSN: 1930-2207
- Website: indianapolisrecorder.com

The Indianapolis Recorder is an American weekly newspaper based in Indianapolis, Indiana, United States. First published in 1895, the Recorder is the longest-running African American newspaper in Indiana and fourth in the U.S.

== History ==
The newspaper was first established by George P. Stewart and William H. Porter as a two-page church bulletin. Although they began the Recorder together, Porter sold his share of the newspaper to Stewart in 1899.

By 1916, the two-page church bulletin had become a four-page newspaper. During this time, the Recorder urged African-Americans to be moral, proud of their heritage, and combat stereotypes. Popular sermons were excerpted, and biographical sketches were also published with a moral focus.

In the 1920s and 1930s, the paper encouraged economic growth in its readership. The weekly also pressed for the end of racial discrimination in employment practices, spoke out against the Ku Klux Klan, and publicly endorsed anti-Klan politicians. During World War II, the paper supported the war effort and like many publications of the time, recognized the contributions of community members. The Recorder also reported on the National Association for the Advancement of Colored People’s drive to integrate the armed services and proudly reported on the success of the Tuskegee Airmen. In the 1940s, circulation reached 40,000.

Throughout the 1950s and 1960s, the Recorder pushed for action in regards to civil rights and desegregation. During this time, the paper reported on Martin Luther King Jr. and Malcolm X while continuing to report on local church activities and marriages. It was during this troubling period that William Raspberry came to work for the Recorder. Raspberry would go on to achieve national prominence as a Pulitzer Prize-winning journalist for The Washington Post.

By 1987, George Stewart's era had come to an end. Eunice M. Trotter, a journalist for The Indianapolis Star, bought the weekly and brought in a new management style. Trotter also introduced an internship program that still exists today, brought in computers, organized the paper into separate four-color sections, and revised the Recorder's charity program. The paper's circulation was audited by ABC during this period and was recorded at more than 13,000. Trotter sold the paper to William G. Mays, an Indianapolis chemical company executive, in 1991.

Under his management, Mays increased the number of staff and updated equipment. He also wanted the paper to be more positive and within six years, the paper's circulation began a decline. It was no longer audited by ABC. By 1998, the Recorder had a staff of 24.

Mays's niece, Carolene Mays, became the general manager of the Recorder in 1998. She served as the general manager of the Recorder for 12 years before returning to public office.

In 2010, Carolene Mays was succeeded by long-time Recorder employee Shannon Williams. Shortly after stepping into the role of president and general manager, she created the Recorder Media Group, which houses the Indianapolis Recorder newspaper and the Indiana Minority Business Magazine.

The Indianapolis Recorder Newspaper Online Collection (1899–2005) was introduced by the IUPUI University Library on September 25, 2011. The project was funded by a grant from the Indianapolis Foundation Library Fund. The Recorder collection was made possible through the support and collaboration of William Mays and his niece, Carolene Mays.

== Today ==
William G. Mays is the publisher of the Indianapolis Recorder and Shannon Williams serves as president and general manager. The Recorder's sections include News, Opinion, Around Town, Health, Business, Religion, Sports, and Education. The paper continues to be published and delivered weekly.

In addition to the newspaper, the Recorder also serves clients through the Recorder Media Group. The Recorder Media Group offers customized services in order to meet the specific needs of each client. These services include marketing, public relations, collaterals, graphic design, newsletter, publishing, script writing, strategy development, promotional advertising, and photography.

== JAWS ==
The Journalism and Writing Seminars (JAWS) program, which was created by Trotter, is part of the Recorder's nonprofit branch and gives minority high-school students hands-on experience in the field of journalism. Students go through training sessions yearly from September to May, where they develop professional communication skills with the help of industry professionals. JAWS participants also write news and feature stories that are published in the newspaper and on the Recorder's official website.

The goal of the JAWS program is to encourage students to major in communications and pursue a career in journalism.

== Future plans ==
The Recorder is focusing on electronic expansion in order to reach younger audiences who are not as likely to read a printed newspaper. The Recorder continues to serve the community through Indianapolis Recorder Charities and seeks to grow its collaborations with other media outlets.

== Awards ==
The Recorder received the Indiana Journalism Award in 2000.

The National Newspaper Publishers Association has honored the Indianapolis Recorder with many Merit Awards over the years.

The following is a list of some awards that the Recorder has received in recent years:

- Phillip Randolph Messenger Award - 1st place
- General Excellence Award - 1st place
- Best Original Advertising - 1st place
- Best Layout & Design - 1st place
- Best Layout/Design Other Than Page One - 1st place
- Best Editorial Cartoon - 1st place
- Best Church Page - 1st place
- Best Print Feature - 1st place
- Best Investigative Reporting - 1st place
- Best Column Writing - 2nd place
- Best Entertainment Section - 2nd place
- Best Church Page - 2nd place
- Best Circulation Promotion - 2nd place
- Best Sports Section - 2nd place
- Best Lifestyle Section - 2nd place
- Best News Pictures - 3rd place
- Best Special Edition - 3rd place
- Best Editorial Cartoon - 3rd place
- Best Use of Photography Award - 3rd place
- Community Service Award - 3rd place
- Best Circulation Promotion - 3rd place
- General Excellence - 3rd place
- Best Practices Award
- Champions of Diversity Award
- Indiana Minority AIDS Coalition Media Award
- Indianapolis Black Chamber of Commerce Pioneer Award
- Governor's Award
- Mozel Sanders Foundation Humanitarian Award
- State of Indiana Business Award
- World AIDS Day Media Award

== See also ==
- Media in Indianapolis
- Indiana Minority Business Magazine
- List of African American newspapers in Indiana
