= Jon Elrod =

American attorney and politician

Member of the Indiana House of Representatives from the 97th district
- In office November 20, 2006 – November 18, 2008
- Preceded by: Ed Mahern
- Succeeded by: Mary Ann Sullivan

Personal details
- Born: May 3, 1977 (age 49) Indianapolis, Indiana
- Party: Republican
- Education: Xavier University (BA); Indiana University, Bloomington (JD)
- Profession: Attorney

Jonathan "Jon" Robert Elrod (born May 3, 1977) is an American attorney and politician. He is a former member of the Indiana House of Representatives from District 97.

He was the Republican Party candidate in the Indiana's 7th congressional district special election held on March 11, 2008, to fill a vacant seat, losing to Democrat André Carson.

== Early years ==
Jon Elrod grew up on the Southside area of Indianapolis. He graduated from Franklin Central High School in 1995. In 1999, he received a Bachelor of Arts degree (magna cum laude) from Xavier University in Cincinnati, Ohio where he majored in history, minored in Performance Studies (Theater). He was president of the Rugby Football Club.

Elrod received a J.D. degree cum laude in 2002 from Indiana University Maurer School of Law. He was on the editorial staff of the Indiana Law Journal. While in law school, Elrod studied at the University of London, School of Advanced Legal Studies.

Elrod is an associate at Elrod and Mascher, P.C., a law firm in Indianapolis.

== Entrance into politics ==
Elrod successfully ran for the Center Township Board in 2004. The election of a Republican party member for the board was considered to be at "long odds" by the Indianapolis Star (newspaper).

He ran on a platform to streamline local government due to the large disparity between actual funding for poor relief and the overhead operating costs of the Center Township Trustee's Office. At the time, the Indianapolis Star reported in a February 1, 2004 article citing an Indiana Chamber of Commerce Report that the Center Township Trustee spent $2.35 for every $1.00 of poor relief provided.

Elrod ran a strong grassroots campaign for an office that he admits very few people knew existed. He won a close race in the predominantly Democratic district by 35 votes. The next session, several lawmakers introduced bills to eliminate township government in the state altogether. The failure of such bills led Elrod to declare his candidacy for the Indiana State House of Representatives in District 97.

== State Representative for District 97 (Indiana) ==
In an election in 2006, Elrod defeated Ed Mahern by 8 votes. Elrod knocked on nearly 6000 doors and gained a reputation for his personal correspondence with voters in what many called an underdog victory.

== Campaign for U.S. Congress ==
Elrod declared his candidacy for United States House of Representative for the 7th Congressional District of Indiana on November 15, 2007, which, at the time, was held by Julia Carson. Carson died on December 15 causing a by-election to be scheduled for March 11, 2008 instead of during the regular election in November. Elrod won the Republican primary and was challenged by Carson's grandson, city councilman André Carson who is a member of the Democratic Party and Sean Shepard, as a member of the Libertarian Party. Carson defeated Elrod by 11%.

The short amount of time before the election resulted in an emphasis in fundraising before campaigning can start. The seat was last held by a Republican party member in 1972.

At a press conference, Elrod shared his anger at what he felt was a continued lack of urgency from the Indiana State House of Representatives in addressing the growing public outcry over pressing issues like a recent property tax increase in the state. He stated that, "the Indiana General Assembly was once maligned as the ‘worse deliberative body in the country,’ is at a historic threshold. For the first time in a generation, perhaps two generations, the legislature is poised to pass sweeping bipartisan reforms of local government, spending, and property taxes."

He went on to add, "I recognize the potential of this legislature, and I am excited about the tasks before us this session. When the gavel falls for the last time this winter, I will have experienced great achievement or great disappointment. Indiana will have marched toward fairness and efficiency, or stumbled down the same path of political expediency and special interests."

Elrod said that as someone who never desired to seek higher office the thought of Congress seemed absurd. Especially as a Republican from Center Township. However, he relayed that now more than ever, a need for change motivated him to step forward and announce his candidacy for U.S. Congress.

He cited partisanship, influence-peddling, and wedge issues as the reason for sagging Congressional approval ratings. Elrod then shared, "it is abundantly clear which legislature deserves the title of ‘worst deliberate body in the country.’"

Elrod was endorsed by Senator Richard Lugar and The Indianapolis Star.

== Campaign for Reelection as State Representative for District 97 (Indiana) ==
In the 2008 general election, Elrod did not seek a rematch against Carson, deciding to seek reelection in his strongly Democratic constituency. His ability to beat the odds was not enough that year, and Democrat Mary Ann Sullivan defeated him by a 55% to 45% margin.
