= 2008 Indiana's 7th congressional district special election =

- March 11, 2008

Indiana's 7th congressional district
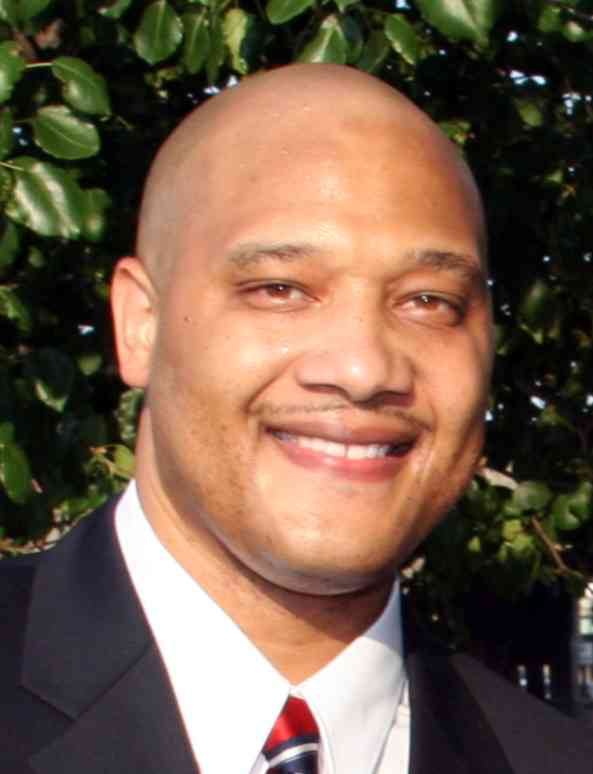

Candidate	André Carson	Jon Elrod
Party	Democratic	Republican
Popular vote	45,634	36,399
Percentage	54.0%	43.0%
U.S. Representative before election
Julia Carson
Democratic
Elected U.S. Representative
André Carson
Democratic

Indiana's 7th congressional district special election of 2008 took place March 11, 2008, to fill the seat in the United States House of Representatives left vacant by the death of 7th district representative Julia Carson (D) on December 15, 2007. The election determined who would fill the vacancy for the rest of the 110th United States Congress. Indiana Gov. Mitch Daniels set the date for the special election. Both political parties had previously agreed to this date. Democrat André Carson won the election with an 18.17% voter turnout.

== Candidates ==
On January 11, the Democratic caucus chose André Carson to run in the March 11 special election. On January 12, the Republicans chose Jon Elrod as their candidate and the Libertarian caucus nominated Sean Shepard.

=== Democratic ===
- André Carson – Indianapolis City-County Council member, District 15, and Julia Carson's grandson
- Ran for Nomination
  - Carolene Mays – State Representative, District 94
  - David Orentlicher – State Representative, District 86
  - Randle Pollard – Attorney
  - Michael Rodman – Marion County Treasurer
  - Joanne Sanders – Indianapolis City-County Council Minority leader, At-Large
  - Jeff White – John Marshall Middle School Principal
  - Frances Nelson Williams – Methodist Hospital Chaplain
- Declined to Run
  - Frank J. Anderson – Marion County Sheriff
  - Carl Drummer – Center Township Trustee
  - Woody Meyers – Former State Health Commissioner
  - Bart Peterson – Former Indianapolis Mayor
  - Greg Porter – State Representative, District 96
  - Robin Winston – Former State Party Chairman

=== Libertarian ===
- Sean Shepard – Small business owner

=== Republican ===
- Jon Elrod – State Representative, District 97
- Ran for Nomination
  - Gabrielle Campo – Social worker
  - Thomas Rose – Radio talk show host and aide to former Mayor Stephen Goldsmith
  - Greg Stroude – Real estate broker
- Declined to Run
  - Eric Dickerson – Businessman, Julia Carson's 2006 challenger

== Environment ==
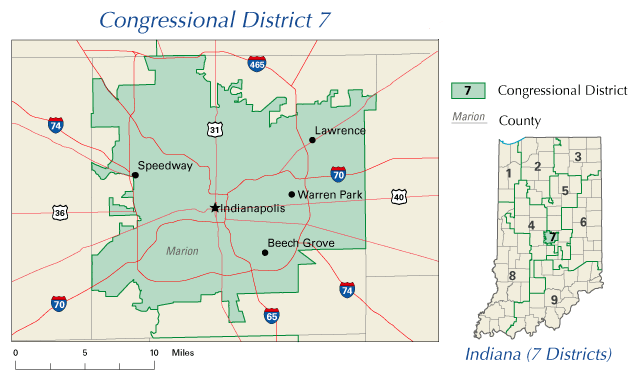
Indiana 7th district map

The district, which covers most of Marion County, is considered difficult for Republicans. It includes most of what was the city of Indianapolis before the creation of Unigov in 1970, and includes most of the more Democratic areas of the county. John Kerry won the 7th district in 2004 with 58%, but after the November 2007 upset of Indianapolis Mayor Bart Peterson by Republican Greg Ballard, the race was assumed to be competitive. However, in the precincts of the 7th District Democrat Bart Peterson still received 54% of the votes.

== Results ==
Indiana 7th District House of Representatives special election, 2008
Party	Candidate	Votes	%	±%
Democratic	André Carson	45,634	54.0%	
Republican	Jon Elrod	36,399	43.0%	
Libertarian	Sean Shepard	2,426	2.9%	
No party	Write-ins	47	0.1%	
Turnout		84,506	18.2%	
Democratic hold		Swing		
