= André Carson =

American politician (born 1974)

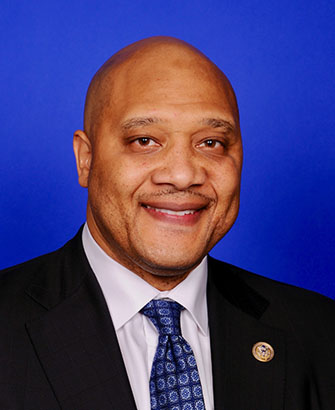

Member of the U.S. House of Representatives from Indiana's 7th district
- Incumbent
- Assumed office March 11, 2008 (Note: Carson's official service begins on the date of the special election, while he was not sworn in until March 13, 2008.)
- Preceded by: Julia Carson

Member of the Indianapolis City-County Council from the 15th district
- In office October 2007 – March 13, 2008
- Preceded by: Patrice Abduallah
- Succeeded by: Doris Minton-McNeill

Personal details
- Born: André Darryl Carson; October 16, 1974 (age 52) Indianapolis, Indiana, U.S.
- Party: Democratic
- Spouse: Mariama Shaheed (divorced)
- Children: 1
- Education: Concordia University, Wisconsin (BA); Indiana Wesleyan University (MS)
- Website: House website Campaign website
- Carson's voice Carson on Islam in the United States. Recorded September 16, 2020

André Darryl Carson (born October 16, 1974) is an American politician serving as the U.S. representative for Indiana's 7th congressional district since 2008. A member of the Democratic Party, his district includes the northern four-fifths of Indianapolis, including Downtown Indianapolis. He became the dean of Indiana's congressional delegation after fellow Democrat Pete Visclosky retired in 2021.

Carson is the grandson of his predecessor, U.S. Representative Julia Carson (1938–2007), whose death in office triggered a special election. He was the second Muslim to be elected to Congress, after Keith Ellison of Minnesota.

== Personal life and early career ==
André Carson was born and raised in Indianapolis. He graduated from Arsenal Technical High School in Indianapolis and received a Bachelor of Arts degree in criminal justice and management from Concordia University Wisconsin (2003), and a Master of Science degree in business management from Indiana Wesleyan University in Marion, Indiana (2005). At a young age, Carson's interest in public service was shaped by his grandmother, the late Congresswoman Julia Carson. Carson grew up in a rough neighborhood, and he credits that experience for shaping his policy views on issues like education, public safety and economic opportunity. He has been married to Mariama Shaheed.

From 1996 to 2005, Carson worked as a compliance officer for the Indiana State Excise Police, the law enforcement arm of the Indiana Alcohol and Tobacco Commission. He was later employed in the anti-terrorism division of Indiana's Department of Homeland Security and then as a marketing specialist for Cripe Architects + Engineers in Indianapolis. He served as a member of the Indianapolis/Marion city-county council from 2007 to 2008.

In December 2007, Julia Carson, who had represented Indiana's 7th district in Congress since 1997, died of lung cancer. Three months later, Carson won a special election for his grandmother's vacant House seat. Carson has retained the seat ever since.

Before being elected to public office, Carson was a Democratic Party Committeeperson in Indianapolis. In 2007, he won a special caucus of the Marion County Democratic Party to become the City-County Councilor for the 15th Council district of Indianapolis-Marion County.

== U.S. House of Representatives ==
=== Elections ===
==== Special election 2008 ====
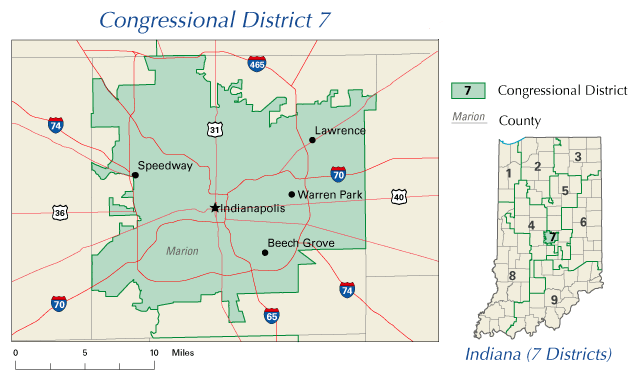
Indiana's 7th congressional district which includes most of Indianapolis

In 2008, Carson won the nominating caucus of the Marion County Democratic Party, giving him the Democratic nomination for the special election to succeed his late grandmother, Julia Carson. During this election, he was endorsed by U.S. Senator Evan Bayh, then-Senator Barack Obama, former Indianapolis Mayor Bart Peterson, Marion County Sheriff Frank J. Anderson, then-Representative from Indiana's 8th district Brad Ellsworth, and retired U.S. Representative Andy Jacobs Jr. House Majority Leader Steny Hoyer and House Speaker Nancy Pelosi contributed $4,000 each from their own campaign funds and $10,000 each from their political action committees to the Carson campaign.

Carson defeated Republican State Representative Jon Elrod and Libertarian Sean Shepard in the special election on March 11, 2008, securing 53% of the vote.

==== 2008 ====
Carson won the primary election with 46%, while Woody Myers received 24%, David Orentlicher received 21%, and Carolene Mays received 8%. Carson was set to face Elrod in the general election, but Elrod dropped out. Gabrielle Campo was selected by a party caucus to replace Elrod.

Carson was reelected in November 2008 to his first full term in Congress with 65% of the vote. His hometown newspaper, The Indianapolis Star, has praised him for "going strong" in his first year in office, writing that Carson had proved "himself to be relentlessly positive and seriously hardworking."

==== 2010 ====
In 2010, Carson again faced perennial Republican candidate Marvin Scott, who took issue with Carson's Muslim faith during the general election. Carson handily defeated Scott.

==== 2012 ====
Carson was reelected for a third term, defeating Republican Carlos May in the general election.

==== 2014 ====
Carson was reelected for a fourth term, defeating Republican Catherine Ping and Libertarian Chris Mayo in the general election.

==== 2016 ====
Carson was reelected for a fifth term, defeating Republican Catherine Ping in a rematch for the general election.

==== 2018 ====
Carson was reelected for a sixth term, defeating Republican Wayne Harmon in the general election.

==== 2020 ====
Carson was reelected for a seventh term, defeating Republican Susan Marie Smith in the general election.

==== 2022 ====
Carson was reelected for an eighth term, defeating Republican Angela Grabovsky in the general election.

==== 2024 ====
Carson was reelected for a ninth term, defeating Republican John Schmitz in the general election.

=== Tenure ===
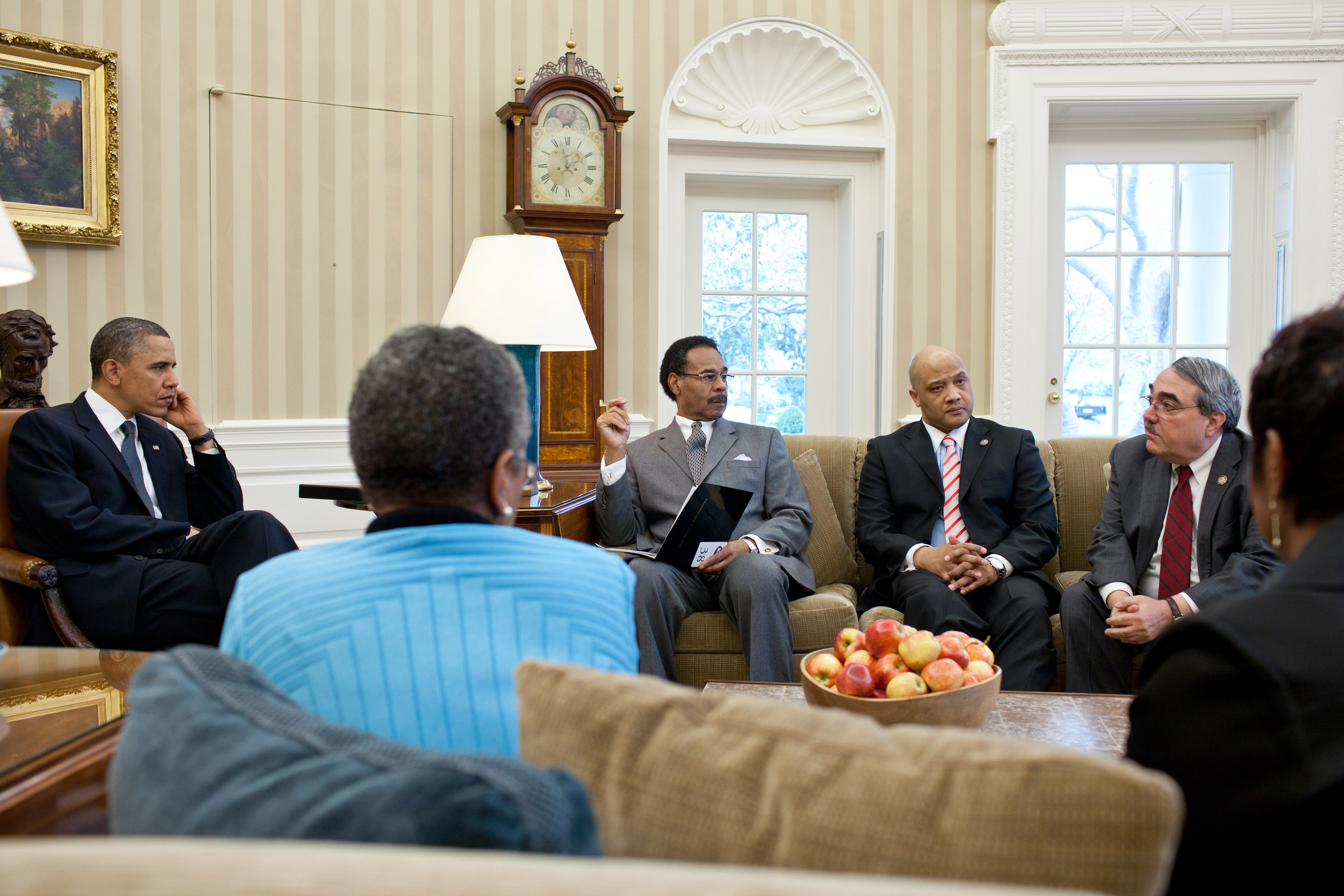
Carson in a meeting with President Obama and members of the Congressional Black Caucus Executive Committee at the Oval Office, 2011

In the 2008 presidential election, Carson endorsed Barack Obama in April 2008, and later won Obama's endorsement in his own May 2008 Democratic primary. Carson was the first member of Indiana's Congressional delegation to announce his support for Obama.

On March 20, 2010, Carson told reporters that health care protesters outside the Capitol hurled racial slurs at fellow Congressional Black Caucus (CBC) member John Lewis. Carson came off the House floor and told reporters his story about health care protesters hurling racial slurs during their walk from the Cannon House Office Building to the chambers. Although audio and video recordings of the protest have been posted online, no proof of the racial slurs has yet been provided, and the reward remains unclaimed.

On August 28, 2011, Carson addressed a gathering of supporters and mentioned the Tea Party movement during his speech. "This is the effort that we're seeing of Jim Crow," Carson said. "Some of these folks in Congress right now would love to see us as second-class citizens. Some of them in Congress right now of this Tea Party movement would love to see you and me... hanging on a tree." Carson declined calls to resign, reaffirming, "I stand on the truth of what I spoke", and clarified that his comments were directed at certain Tea Party leaders and not the movement as a whole.

On December 18, 2019, Carson voted for both articles of impeachment against President Donald Trump and was one of only two House members from Indiana to do so, along with Pete Visclosky.

=== Committee assignments ===
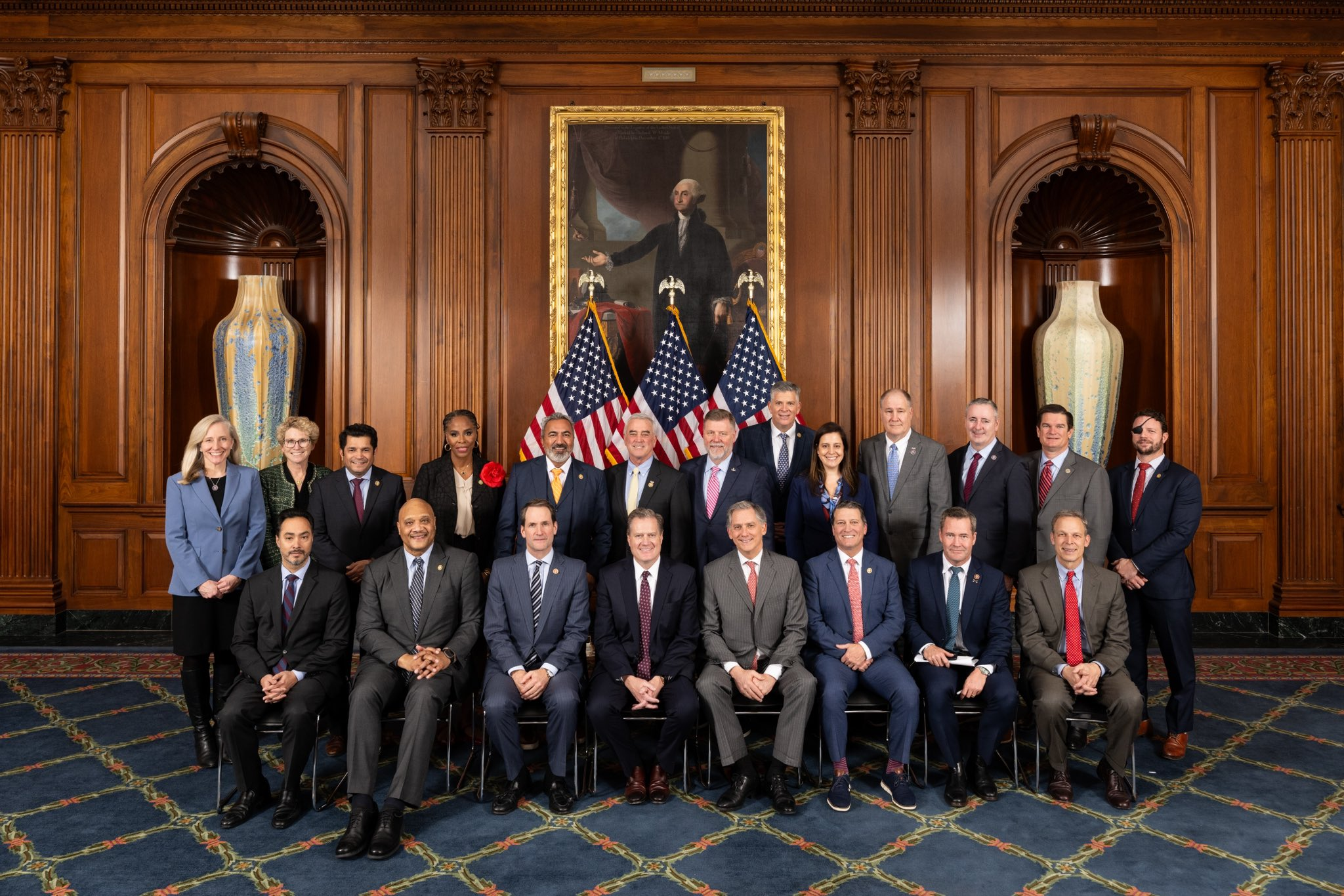
Carson with colleagues on the Permanent Select Committee on Intelligence, 2024

For the 119th Congress:

- Committee on Transportation and Infrastructure
  - Subcommittee on Aviation
  - Subcommittee on Railroads, Pipelines, and Hazardous Materials
- Permanent Select Committee on Intelligence
  - Subcommittee on National Intelligence Enterprise
- Select Committee on Strategic Competition between the United States and the Chinese Communist Party

=== Caucus memberships ===
- Congressional Arts Caucus
- Congressional Equality Caucus
- Black Maternal Health Caucus
- Congressional Progressive Caucus
- New Democrat Coalition
- Human Rights Caucus
- International Conservation Caucus
- Labor and Working Families Caucus
- Congressional Black Caucus
- Congressional Ukraine Caucus
- Rare Disease Caucus
- Congressional Caucus on Turkey and Turkish Americans
- Congressional Caucus for the Equal Rights Amendment

== Political positions ==
=== Economy ===
==== American reinvestment ====
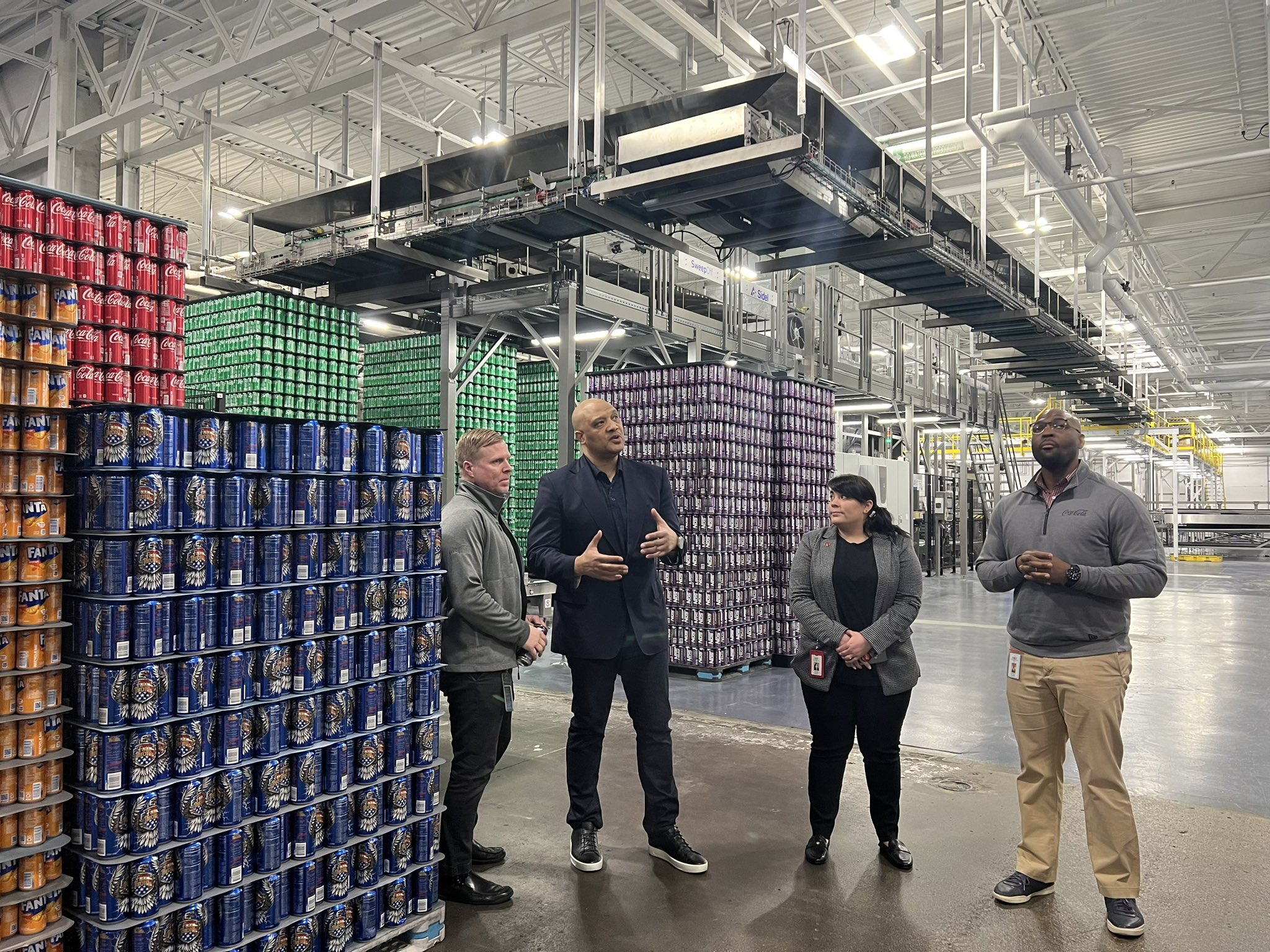
Carson visits the Coca-Cola plant in Speedway, 2023

Carson voted for the American Recovery and Reinvestment Act of 2009 (ARRA), a $787 billion economic stimulus package, aimed at helping the economy recover from a deepening worldwide recession. This act included increased federal spending for health care, infrastructure, education, various tax breaks and incentives, and direct assistance to individuals.

The ARRA led to billions of dollars in investment in Carson's district, including grants to hire more police officers and save teaching jobs, and landmark investments in green technology that created hundreds of new jobs.

==== Consumer protection ====
On June 26, 2009, Carson introduced the Jeremy Warriner Consumer Protection Act (H.R. 3088), which would require General Motors and Chrysler to carry liability insurance that would cover vehicles produced before they filed for bankruptcy in early 2009. The bill is named for Jeremy Warriner, an Indianapolis resident who lost his legs when his defective Chrysler vehicle caught fire during a car accident.

==== Financial services ====
Carson has been a member of the House Committee on Financial Services since taking office in 2008.

Carson voted to pass legislation enacting the Troubled Asset Relief Program on October 3, 2008. He has also voted to pass legislation increasing oversight over the Troubled Asset Relief Program, limiting executive pay, reforming subprime mortgage markets and regulating the financial industry.

Carson co-sponsored H.R. 627, the Credit Cardholders Bill of Rights, which sought to increase transparency and regulation in the credit card industry. President Obama signed the legislation into law on May 22, 2009.

Carson has voiced his support for legislation creating the Consumer Finance Protection Agency and monitoring systemic risk in the financial sector.

In February 2025, he introduced the Taxpayer Data Protection Act, which would prevent individuals without lawful authorization from accessing the payment system of the Department of the Treasury.

=== Education ===
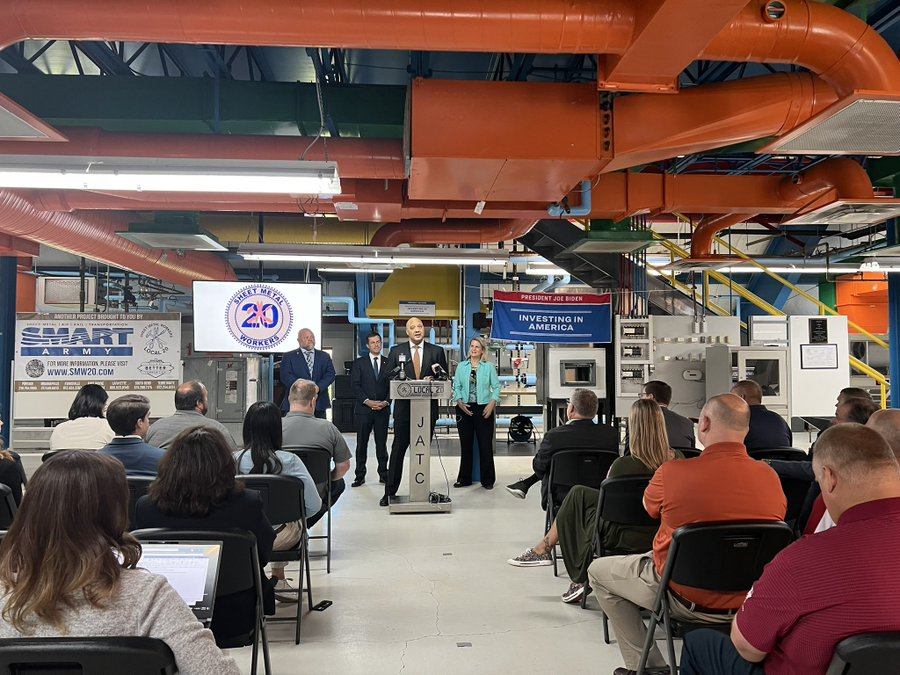
Carson at the Sheet Metal Workers Union hall discussing its apprenticeship program, 2023

Carson has stated his support for programs that improve teacher education and training, improve aging school infrastructure and increase access to affordable, secondary education.

Carson is the author of H.R. 3147, the Young Adults Financial Literacy Act, which was introduced on July 9, 2009. This legislation would establish a grant program to fund partnerships between educational institutions aimed at providing financial literacy education to young adults and families.

On September 17, 2009, Carson voted for H.R. 3221, the Student Aid and Fiscal Responsibility Act, which would fully fund the Pell Grant program and increase other student financial aid programs to make college more affordable.

Carson made a speech to an Islamic group that resulted in criticism from groups when he stated that American public schools should be modeled on Islamic madrassas. He granted an interview to reporter Mary Beth Schneider of The Indianapolis Star in which he maintained his remarks had been taken out of context. On the same date, he issued a press release clarifying his position that no "particular faith should be the foundation of our public schools."

=== Energy and environment ===
Carson has supported investment in the development of new technologies to reduce American dependence on foreign oil, create new jobs and begin to mitigate fossil fuels' adverse environmental effects. He has opposed legislation to increase offshore drilling for oil or natural gas, instead promoting use of solar, wind, biofuel, biomass, and other renewable fuels.

On June 26, 2009, Carson voted for H.R. 2454, the American Clean Energy and Security Act, which seeks to comprehensively address the effects of climate change by funding development of alternative energy technologies and implementing a cap and trade system.

=== Foreign affairs ===
==== Afghanistan and Iraq ====
Carson believes that "American efforts to capture and kill al Qaeda terrorists have greatly diminished" because of the Iraq War. During the War in Afghanistan, Carson often stated his belief that al Qaeda and the Taliban posed the most imminent threat to the United States. Accordingly, he pushed for a reduction of troops in Iraq to cover the needs of the War in Afghanistan.

==== Disease prevention ====
On July 24, 2008, Carson voted to pass the Tom Lantos and Henry J. Hyde United States Global Leadership Against HIV/AIDS, Tuberculosis, and Malaria Reauthorization Act (H.R. 5501) which provided aid to developing countries fighting high rates of HIV/AIDS, malaria, and tuberculosis. He successfully amended the bill to create "a transatlantic, technological medium of exchange that allows African scientists and American medical professionals to collaborate on the best methods for treating and preventing the spread of HIV/AIDS on the African continent."

==== Israel and Palestine ====
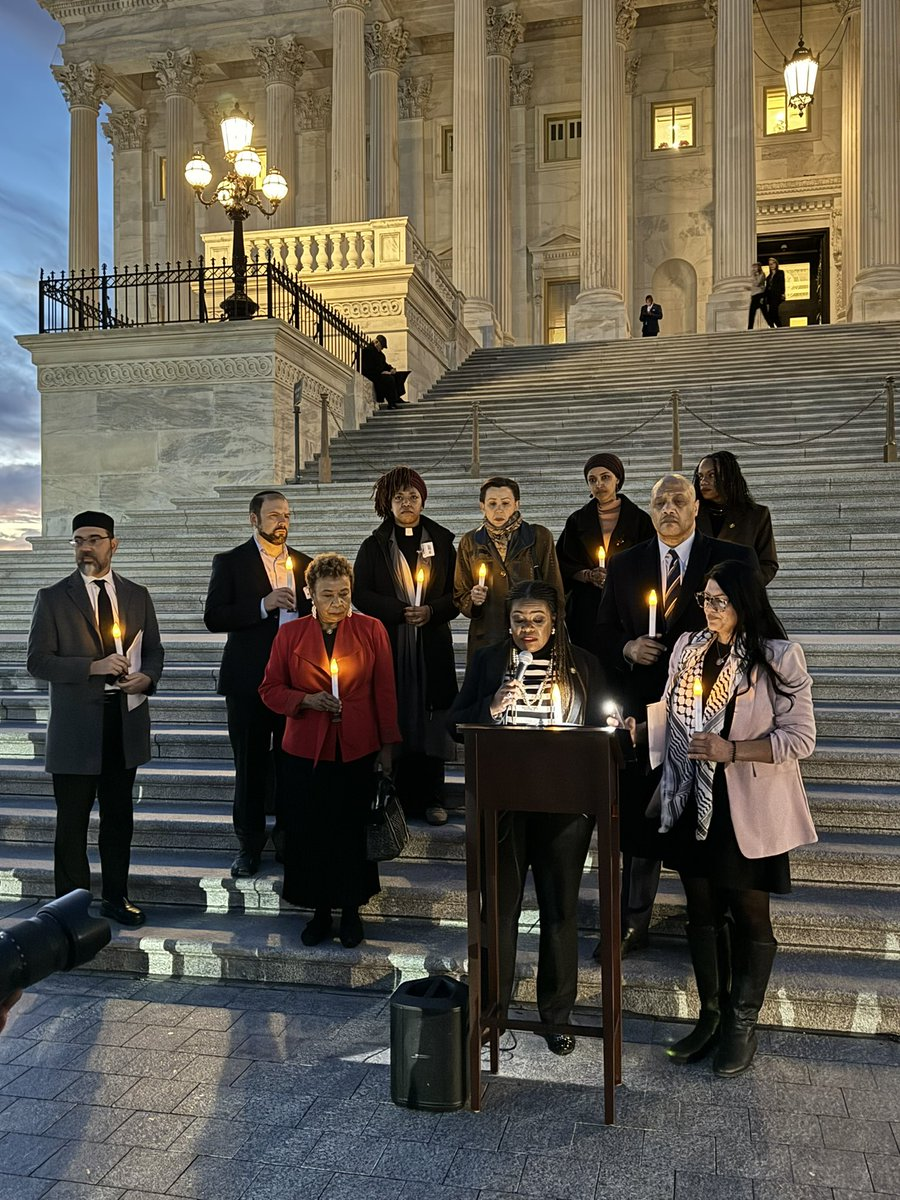
Carson at a vigil for the Israeli and Palestinian lives lost during the Gaza War, November 2023

Carson is opposed to Israeli settlements in Palestinian territory — which are considered illegal under international human rights law and Article 49 of the Geneva Convention — calling them "illegitimate and a major barrier to peace". In July 2019, Carson voted against a House resolution condemning the Boycott, Divestment and Sanctions movement. In August 2021, he wrote to Treasury Secretary Janet Yellen to call for an investigation into American charities supporting Israeli settlements.

In September 2021, Carson was one of nine House members to vote against funding Israel's Iron Dome missile defense program.

In 2021, he stated in an interview with Haaretz, "I will always speak out in defense of the Jewish community but will also unapologetically speak out for my Palestinian brothers."

In 2022, Carson introduced the Justice For Shireen Act, in response to the killing of American journalist, Shireen Abu Akleh by the IDF. That same year, he criticized the Israeli criminalization of human rights organizations, stating on Twitter, "I am upset by the latest attacks by the Israeli army on Palestinian human rights groups. Silencing human rights defenders is an attempt to avoid accountability. I reiterate calls from myself and my colleagues that the Biden administration immediately condemn this repression."

On July 18, 2023, he, along with eight other Progressive Democrats (Alexandria Ocasio-Cortez, Cori Bush, Jamaal Bowman, Summer Lee, Ilhan Omar, Ayanna Pressley, Delia Ramirez, and Rashida Tlaib), voted against a congressional non-binding resolution proposed by August Pfluger which states that “the State of Israel is not a racist or apartheid state", that Congress rejects "all forms of antisemitism and xenophobia" and that “the United States will always be a staunch partner and supporter of Israel."

On October 25, 2023, Carson and eight other progressive Democrats (Alexandria Ocasio-Cortez, Jamaal Bowman, Cori Bush, Al Green, Summer Lee, Ilhan Omar, Delia Ramirez, and Rashida Tlaib), along with Republican Thomas Massie, voted against congressional bi-partisan non-binding resolution H. Res. 771 supporting Israel in the wake of the 2023 Hamas attack on Israel. The resolution stated that the House of Representatives: "stands with Israel as it defends itself against the barbaric war launched by Hamas and other terrorists" and "reaffirms the United States' commitment to Israel's security"; the resolution passed by an overwhelming 412-10-6 margin.

Carson introduced a bill in March 2025 to restore funding to UNRWA that had been previously cut.

==== Syria ====
In 2023, Carson was among 56 Democrats to vote in favor of H.Con.Res. 21, which directed President Joe Biden to remove U.S. troops from Syria within 180 days.

=== Health care ===
Carson is a strong supporter of health care reform legislation that increases access to medical care for millions of uninsured Americans and provides a more stable system for those at risk of losing their health insurance. On July 30, 2009, he signed a letter from the Congressional Progressive Caucus to House leadership, calling for a robust public option to be included in any health care reform bill.

He has opposed taxes both on the medical device industry and employer-provided health insurance plans as a means to pay for health care reform. Instead, he has called for finding savings in the current health system by reducing waste, fraud and abuse in the Medicare system, as well as implementing a surcharge on the wealthiest Americans as a means to cover the costs of reform. He has also voiced his opposition for health care reform legislation that increases the deficit.

On November 7, 2009, Carson voted to pass H.R. 3962, the Affordable Health Care for America Act, the House version of legislation designed to reform the American health insurance industry.

Carson voted in 2026 to extend the Affordable Care Act enhanced tax credits.

=== Housing ===
Citing a high foreclosure rate in Indianapolis, Carson has named foreclosure prevention and increased affordable housing among his top priorities.

On May 7, 2009, Carson voted to pass the Mortgage Reform and Anti-Predatory Lending Act of 2009 (H.R. 1728), which regulates the mortgage lending industry by setting limits on types of loans offered to potential borrowers. He authored an amendment to the legislation that funded the distribution of information about foreclosure rescue scams through targeted mailings.

=== National security ===
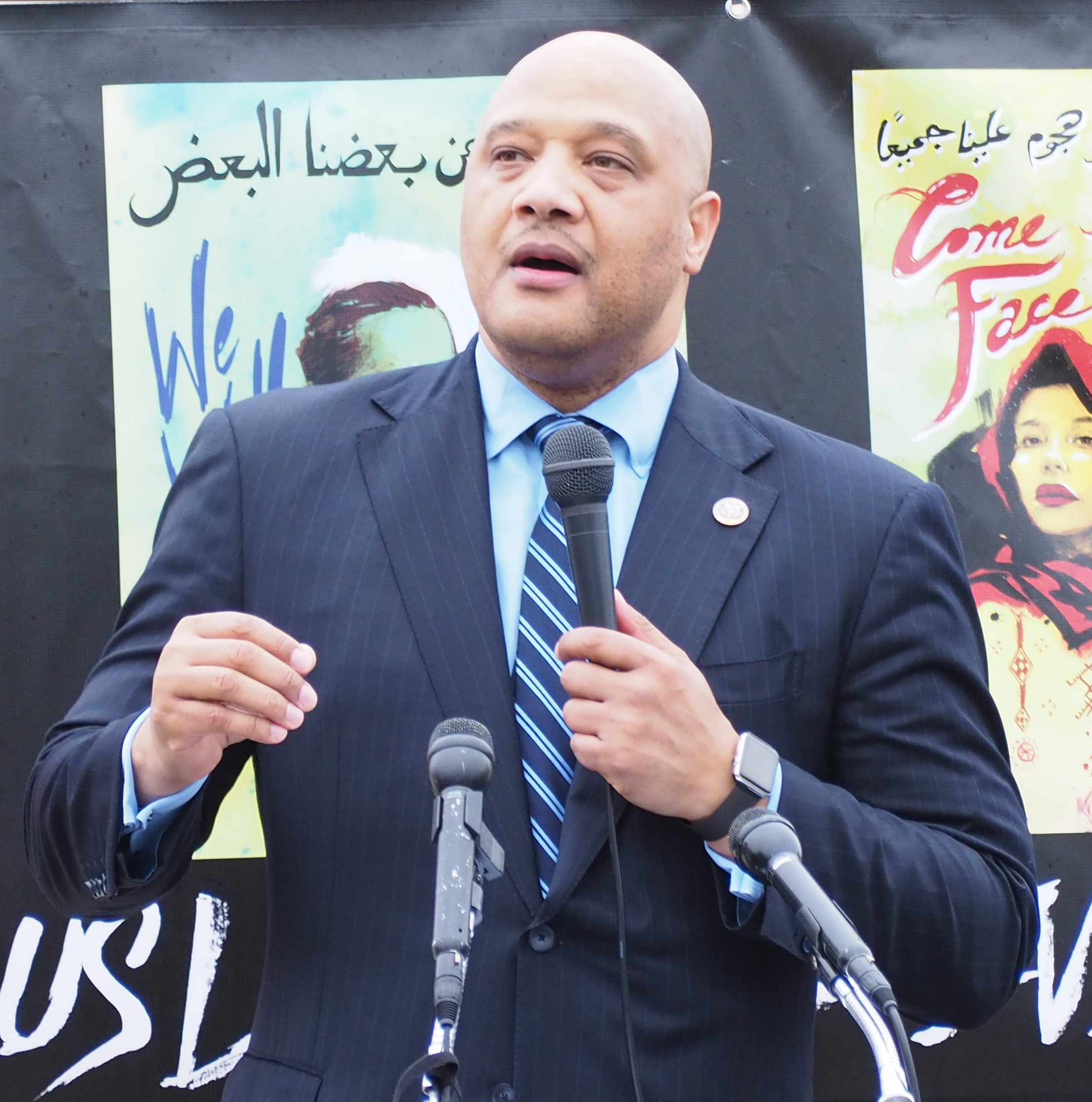
André Carson speaking at the "No Muslim Ban Ever" rally outside the Supreme Court, April 2018

Carson is the only member of Congress to have served in a Department of Homeland Security Fusion Center. He has voted to increase appropriations funding for the Department of Homeland Security. In 2017, Carson attended a protest at Indianapolis International Airport against President Trump's executive order to temporarily place limits on immigration until better screening methods are devised. Carson decried the executive order as part of a "bigotry campaign", saying: "For those who want to make America great again, we have to remind them that the first article of the constitution says Congress shall make no law respecting [the] establishment of religion. Make no mistake about it: This is a Muslim ban."

=== Public safety ===
In 2009, Carson introduced two pieces of legislation aimed at reducing recidivism. The Recidivism Reduction Act (H.R. 2829) aims to attack the cycle of recidivism by ensuring prompt access to federal supplemental security income and Medicaid benefits for ex-offenders reentering society and addressing the gap in mental health services. The Personal Responsibility and Work Opportunity Reconciliation Act would repeal federal laws that prevent drug felons from receiving TANF benefits.

In 2008, Carson helped the City of Indianapolis secure a federal COPS grant to hire more police officers. The grant was awarded as part of the ARRA.

=== Marijuana ===
As of August 2025, Carson has received an "A" grade from the National Organization for the Reform of Marijuana Laws (NORML) based on public statements and voting records.

== Electoral history ==
Indiana's 7th Congressional District Special Election (March 11, 2008)
Party	Candidate	Votes	%
Democratic	André Carson	45,668	54.04
Republican	Jonathan Elrod	36,415	43.09
Libertarian	Sean Sheppard	2,430	2.88
Total votes		84,513	100.00
Turnout			
Democratic hold			

Indiana's 7th Congressional District General Election (2008)
Party	Candidate	Votes	%
Democratic	André Carson*	172,650	65.08
Republican	Gabrielle Campo	92,645	34.92
Total votes		265,295	100.00
Turnout			
Democratic hold			

Indiana's 7th Congressional District Election (2010)
Party	Candidate	Votes	%
Democratic	André Carson*	86,011	58.90
Republican	Marvin B. Scott	55,213	37.81
Libertarian	Dav Wilson	4,815	3.30
Total votes		146,039	100.00
Turnout			
Democratic hold			

Indiana's 7th Congressional District Election (2012)
Party	Candidate	Votes	%
Democratic	André Carson*	162,122	62.85
Republican	Carlos May	95,828	37.15
Total votes		257,950	100.00
Turnout			
Democratic hold			

Indiana's 7th Congressional District Election, (2014)
Party	Candidate	Votes	%
Democratic	André Carson*	61,443	54.73
Republican	Catherine Ping	46,887	41.77
Libertarian	Chris Mayo	3,931	3.50
Total votes		112,261	100.00
Democratic hold			

Indiana's 7th Congressional District Election (2016)
Party	Candidate	Votes	%
Democratic	André Carson*	158,739	60.00
Republican	Catherine Ping	94,456	35.70
Libertarian	Drew Thompson	11,475	4.30
Total votes		264,670	100.00
Turnout			52
Democratic hold			

Indiana's 7th Congressional District Election (2018)
Party	Candidate	Votes	%
Democratic	André Carson*	141,139	64.9
Republican	Wayne Harmon	76,457	35.1
Total votes		217,596	100.0
Democratic hold			

Indiana's 7th Congressional District Election (2020)
Party	Candidate	Votes	%
Democratic	André Carson*	176,422	62.4%
Republican	Susan Marie Smith	106,146	37.6%
Total votes		282,568	100.0%
Democratic hold			

Indiana's 7th Congressional District Election (2022)
Party	Candidate	Votes	%
Democratic	André Carson*	116,870	66.9%
Republican	Angela Grabovsky	53,487	30.6%
Libertarian	Gavin Maple	4,227	2.4%
Total votes		174,584	100.0%
Democratic hold			

Indiana's 7th Congressional District Election (2024)
Party	Candidate	Votes	%
Democratic	André Carson*	185,733	68.3%
Republican	John P. Schmitz	78,707	29.0%
Libertarian	Rusty Johnson	7,359	2.7%
Total votes		271,799	100.0%
Democratic hold			

== See also ==
- List of African-American United States representatives
- List of Muslim members of the United States Congress

U.S. House of Representatives
Preceded by Julia Carson	Member of the U.S. House of Representatives from Indiana's 7th congressional district 2008–present	Incumbent
U.S. order of precedence (ceremonial)
Preceded by Rob Wittman	United States representatives by seniority 64th	Succeeded by Steve Scalise
