= Indiana Minority Business Magazine =

Indiana Minority Business Magazine (IMBM) is one of the leading publications in the state that focuses on lifestyle, business and diversity.

== History and profile ==
IMBM was founded by Rickie Clark in 2003.

In May 2007, IMBM was acquired by the Indianapolis Recorder under president and general manager, Shannon Williams and publisher William G. Mays. IMBM's first edition under the Recorder's management was published on June 28, 2007. In 2010, the magazine was incorporated into the Recorder Media Group along with the Indianapolis Recorder Newspaper.

IMBM is informative, entertaining and designed to connect with all minorities. The publication is committed to promoting and reaching diverse populations. In addition to serving as the president and general manager of the Indianapolis Recorder, Shannon Williams serves in the same capacity for IMBM. William G. Mays is the current publisher. IMBM continues to be published quarterly.

== Awards ==
IMBM has won several awards throughout the years.

- 1st Place - Best Layout and Design - Society of Professional Journalists
- 1st Place - Coverage of Minority Issues
- 1st Place Coverage of Children's Issues
- 2nd Place - Investigative Reporting
- 2nd Place - Best Coverage of Children's Issues
- 3rd Place - Best Layout/Design on Page 1
- 3rd Place - Best Arts/Entertainment Feature - NNPA
- 1st Place - Best Layout and Design
- 2nd Place - Best Column Writing
- 2nd Place - Best Church/Religious Page
- 3rd Place - Best Special Edition - Black History Month tabloid
