= Carolene Mays =

American politician

Carolene R. Mays-Medley

Member of the Indiana State University Board of Trustees
- Incumbent
- Assumed office January 19, 2026
- Appointed by: Mike Braun
- Preceded by: Cynthia Powers

Executive Director of White River State Park Development Commission
- In office 2016–2021
- Governor: Mike Pence; Eric Holcomb
- Preceded by: Bob Whitt
- Succeeded by: Jake Oakman

Member of the Indiana House of Representatives from the 94th district
- In office November 6, 2002 – November 5, 2008
- Preceded by: Jeb Bardon
- Succeeded by: Cherrish Pryor

Personal details
- Born: July 21, 1961 (age 65) Evansville, Indiana
- Party: Democratic
- Spouse: Fred Medley
- Children: 1
- Education: Indiana State University

Carolene Mays is an American politician serving on the Indiana State University Board of Trustees since 2026. A member of the Democratic Party, she served as the executive director of the White River State Park from 2016 to 2021.

== Career history ==
In 2010, Mays was appointed by Governor Mitch Daniels as a commissioner for the Indiana Utility Regulatory Commission (IURC) which regulates the utility industry. She was reappointed and named vice-chair in 2014 by Governor Mike Pence.

While at the IURC, she served on the board of directors for the National Association of Regulatory Utility Commissioners (NARUC); as president of Mid-America Regulatory Conference; and as chairperson of the Critical Infrastructure Committee. She also served on the Water and Washington Action Committees. She was named a 2013 Smart Grid Today Top 50 Smart Grid Pioneer for her leadership in cyber and physical security.

Mays was a finalist for an appointment by President Barack Obama as the Midwest Regional Director of Housing and Urban Development (HUD). She withdrew from consideration upon receiving the IURC appointment; later finding out she had been selected by the president.

Prior, she was president of the Indianapolis Recorder newspaper and Indiana Minority Business Magazine. Under her leadership, the Recorder emerged as one of the nation's largest, most award-winning newspapers in the National Newspaper Publishers Association. She purchased Indiana Minority Business Magazine and it became profitable under her management in the first year of ownership.

Mays was the producer and co-host of "Recorder On Air Report Television Show" on a cable network, and co-host of a television news segment, "Community Link", on Central Indiana's CBS affiliate. She left the position in 2008, but in 2018, she again began hosting Community Link, on WISH-TV.

Previously, at Mays Chemical Co. she was Manager of Marketing, Customer Service and National Accounts. She began her career at Occidental Chemical Co., Inc. where she held positions in sales and corporate account management, throughout the U.S.

Mays was elected to the Indiana Legislature in 2002; serving as State Representative for three terms. Nationally she served on the National Black Caucus of State Legislators, National Conference of State Legislators, and Women in Government. Mays had to retire from the State Legislature, November 2008 after making an unsuccessful bid for Congress.

Mays currently serves on the Boards of: One America Financial Services, Heartland Church of Indianapolis, Cyber Leadership Alliance, Federal Bureau of Investigation (FBI) Citizens Academy, St. Vincent Hospital Foundation, IU Lilly School of Philanthropy Mays Institute as Vice-Chair, National Institute of Fitness and Sport, Leadership Indianapolis Stanley K. Lacy Executive Leadership Series. She is a Lifetime board member of the Indiana Sports Corporation. She is also the President of the Indianapolis Chapter of the Links, Inc.

One of her recent business and community accomplishments was to moderate the 2017-2018 Stanley K. Lacy Executive Leadership Series, developing future leaders. She is the first and only African-American female leader to hold this position in its 43-year history.

Highlights of some previous boards include: Julian Center for Domestic Violence, Indianapolis Neighborhood Housing Partnership, Capitol Improvement Board, University of Indianapolis, and Peyton Manning's Peyback Foundation. Among her many past volunteer roles, she was Chairperson of three NCAA Women's Final Fours - in 2016, 2011 and 2005. She was the 2012 NFL Super Bowl Indianapolis Division Chairperson of Administration which included Office Operations and Human Resources, where she led the hiring of all personnel for the Super Bowl.

Among her many awards, Mays recently was named by the Center for Leadership Development as the Madam CJ Walker Outstanding Woman of the Year. She received a 2017 Community Leader and Servant Award from Martin University and the 2017 Girl Scouts Award of Courage. She was also honored with a Sagamore of the Wabash by former Governor Mike Pence.

She has been featured in Indianapolis Monthly magazine as one of "Indy's Most Powerful" and twice honored by the Indianapolis Business Journal as one of "Indiana's Most Influential Women", including in 2019. Her accomplishments were highlighted twice as the feature cover story of the Indianapolis Woman Magazine, as well as in Indiana Minority Business Magazine. She is honored in Ben Davis High School's Hall of Fame and as an Indiana State University Distinguished Alumni.

On the political front, Mays received many legislator of the year awards and was listed by Roll Call, a Washington D.C. publication, as a Rising Star in Indiana Politics. In bipartisan fashion, she is a Democrat, who has been appointed by three Republican governors.

Mays has a B.S. in business management from Indiana State University and is a currently a candidate for a Master of Jurisprudence from Indiana University McKinney School of Law. She is a 2017 graduate of the FBI Citizen's Academy. She is an active member and overseer of Heartland Church, Alpha Kappa Alpha sorority, Indianapolis chapter of The Links, and Northeasterners. She is married to Fred Medley and has a daughter, Jada and three step-sons, Frederick II, Niles and Chase.

== Education ==
- Indiana State University, B.S., 1985 with a major in business management and a minor in marketing
- Ben Davis High School, Indianapolis, Indiana

== Political ==
- Indiana State Legislature – State Representative, November 2002 – November 2008
- State Committees: Vice-Chairman – Small Business and Economic Development; Ways and Means; and Public Health
- National Black Caucus of State Legislators: Health; and Vice Chair – Small Business
- Indiana Black Legislative Caucus, Treasurer
- National Caucus of State Legislators: Business and Commerce
- Women in Government
- National Association of Regulatory Utility Commissioners (NARUC) appointed as Chair of the Committee on Critical Infrastructure; and on the Washington Action and Water Committees

== Current employment ==
- Indiana State University, 2026–present, Trustee, appointed by Mike Braun.

== Previous employment ==
- State of Indiana, April 2016 - August 2021, Executive Director, White River State Park Development Commission appointed by Governor Mike Pence. Reappointed by Governor Eric Holcomb.
- State of Indiana, February 2010 - April 2016, Commissioner, Indiana Utility Regulatory Commission, appointed by Governor Mitch Daniels in 2010. Reappointed by Governor Mike Pence in 2014 as Commissioner and named Vice-Chairman
- Indianapolis Recorder Newspaper, 1998–2010, Publisher & President, also serving as President of Indianapolis Recorder Charities (a 501c3)
- Indiana Minority Business Magazine, 2007–2010, Publisher & President
- Recorder On Air Report (ROAR), 1998–2008, Host and Producer of the ROAR, a public affairs and community news television talk show, airing weekly on Central Indiana cable networks
- Community Link, 2000–2008, Co-host of weekly television news segment on the local CBS affiliate disseminating news from the African-American and Hispanic communities to a broader audience
- Mays Chemical Company, 1991–1998, Manager of Customer Service and National Accounts
- Occidental Chemical Company, Inc., 1985–1991, Various positions in Sales and Corporate Account Management throughout the nation

== Community service - boards of directors ==
- 2011 NCAA Women's Final Four, Chairperson
- 2012 NFL Super Bowl Committee, Division Chairperson
- Indiana Sports Corporation Board, Vice-Chairman
- Peyton Manning's PeyBack Foundation Board
- Press Club of Indiana
- Former Colts Player Tarik Glenn's D.R.E.A.M. Alive Foundation
- Ivy Tech State College – President's Diversity Council
- Capital Improvement Board, appointed by Mayor Greg Ballard

== Organization affiliations ==
- Heartland Church; Alpha Kappa Alpha sorority; Indianapolis chapter of The Links; N.A.A.C.P.
