= Sue Gilroy =

Sue Gilroy may refer to:

- Sue Bailey (table tennis) (born 1972), née Gilroy, British para table tennis player and primary school teacher
- Sue Anne Gilroy (born 1948), American politician in Indiana
