= 2007 Indianapolis mayoral election =

- November 6, 2007
- Turnout: 26.32% ▼0.49pp
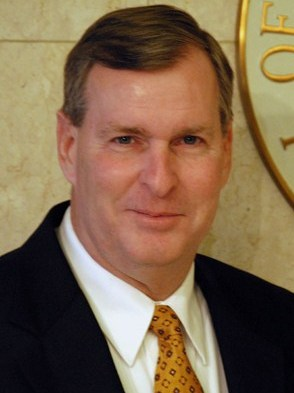

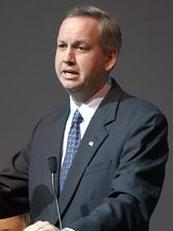
| Nominee | Greg Ballard | Bart Peterson |
| Party | Republican | Democratic |
| Popular vote | 83,238 | 77,926 |
| Percentage | 50.4% | 47.2% |
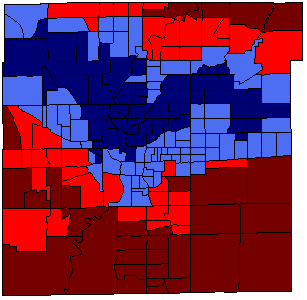
- Voting by party by neighborhood. The darkest blue shade represents more than 60% of votes were for Peterson, the lighter blue shade represents more than 50% for Peterson. The darkest red shade represents more than 60% of votes were for Ballard, the lighter red shade represents more than 50% for Ballard.
Mayor before election
Bart Peterson
Democratic
Elected mayor
Greg Ballard
Republican

The Indianapolis mayoral election of 2007 took place on November 6, 2007. Voters elected the Mayor of Indianapolis, members of the Indianapolis City-County Council, as well as several other local officials. Incumbent Democrat Bart Peterson was seeking a third term. Republicans nominated a Marine veteran, Greg Ballard, to run against Peterson. In what was called "the biggest upset in Indiana political history", Ballard defeated Peterson 50% to 47%.

The Indianapolis City-County elections took place alongside the mayoral election.

== Candidates ==
- Democrat Bart Peterson, incumbent Mayor, ran for a third term.
- Republican Greg Ballard
- Libertarian Fred Peterson

== Campaign ==
Peterson was vastly considered a lock to win the election by political experts. The incumbent Peterson had nearly 30 times as much campaign money as the challenger. Peterson, who started with considerable fundraising advantages, raised nearly $1.5 million since April and had $1.5 million left in late October. In contrast, Ballard raised nearly $225,000 since April and had just over $51,000 left in his campaign fund in late October. Peterson spent nearly $1.5 million on TV and radio ads and $113,000 on polling and research. Two weeks before election day, Ballard had still not put up any TV ads.

== Issues ==
The two major issues in the mayoral campaign were crime and taxes. Residents felt property taxes were most important due to the spike in the tax. Rising crime was another major issue in the election.

== Election results ==
Indianapolis mayoral election, 2007
| Party | Candidate | Votes | % | ±% |
|---|---|---|---|---|
| Republican | Greg Ballard | 83,238 | 50.4 | |
| Democratic | Bart Peterson (incumbent) | 77,926 | 47.2 | |
| Libertarian | Fred Peterson | 3,787 | 2.3 | |
| No party | Write-Ins | 51 | 0.1 | |
| Turnout | | 165,002 | 26.2 | |
| Majority | | 5,312 | 3.2 | |
| Republican gain from Democratic | | Swing | | |

| Preceded by 2003 | Indianapolis mayoral election 2007 | Succeeded by 2011 |
