= Jane Pauley =

American journalist (born 1950)

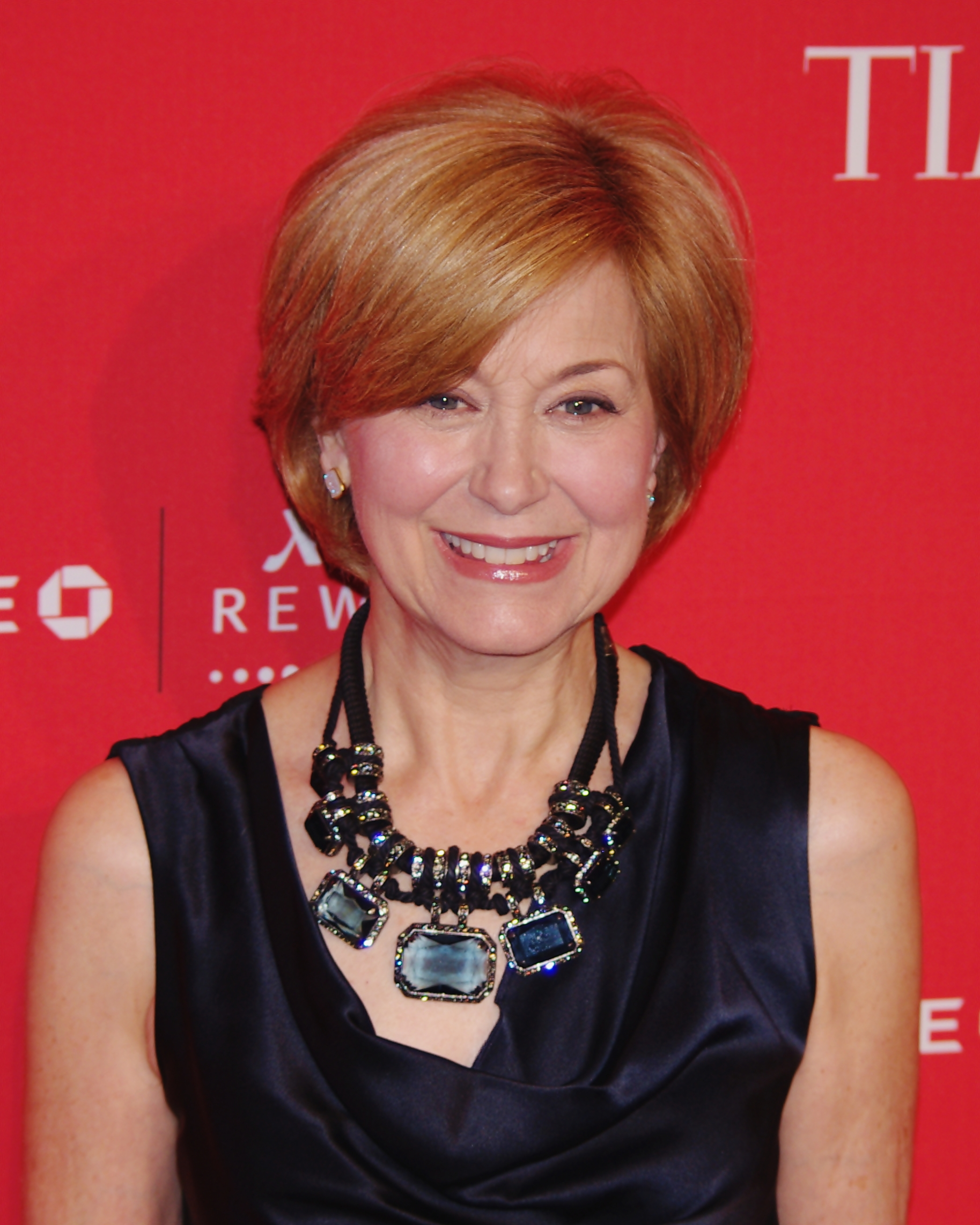
- Pauley in 2012
- Born: Margaret Jane Pauley; October 31, 1950 (age 75); Indianapolis, Indiana, U.S.
- Education: Indiana University Bloomington (BA)
- Occupations: News anchor; television host
- Years active: 1972–present
- Spouse: Garry Trudeau (m. 1980)
- Children: 3

Margaret Jane Pauley (born October 31, 1950) is an American television host and author, active in news reporting since 1972. She first became widely known as Barbara Walters's successor on the NBC morning show Today, beginning at the age of 25, where she was a co-anchor from 1976 to 1989, at first with Tom Brokaw, and later with Bryant Gumbel; for a short while in the late 1980s she and Gumbel worked with Deborah Norville. In 1989, with her job apparently threatened by Norville's addition to the program, she asked to be released from her contract, but her request was denied. Her next regular anchor position was at the network's newsmagazine Dateline NBC from 1992 to 2003, where she teamed with Stone Phillips.

In 2003, Pauley left NBC News and in 2004–05 hosted The Jane Pauley Show, a syndicated daytime talk show which was canceled after one season. In 2009, she began to appear on The Today Show as a contributor hosting a weekly segment sponsored by AARP called "Your Life Calling".

In 2014, Pauley appeared as an interview subject on the CBS program CBS Sunday Morning; positive audience response to this segment led to her being hired as a contributor to the show later in 2014. She was elevated to the role of the program's host in 2016, succeeding Charles Osgood, once again making her the anchor of a regular morning news program for the first time in over 25 years and becoming her first job as the host of any television program since 2005; she continues in this role as of 2025.

Pauley has publicly acknowledged her struggle with bipolar disorder. She is married to the cartoonist Garry Trudeau, creator of the comic strip Doonesbury.

== Early life ==
Margaret Jane Pauley was born in Indianapolis, Indiana, on October 31, 1950. She is a fifth-generation Hoosier and the second child of Richard Grandison Pauley and Mary E. (née Patterson) Pauley. Her father was a traveling salesman, and her mother was a homemaker. According to her memoir, Skywriting: A Life Out of the Blue, Pauley described herself as such a shy little kid she allowed her second-grade teacher to call her Margaret Pauley all year rather than tell her she preferred her middle name, Jane. Pauley grew up idolizing her older sister, Ann, who has been her closest confidante since childhood.

A speech and debate champion at Warren Central High School in Indianapolis, Pauley placed first in the Girls' Extemporaneous Speaking division of the National Forensic League in Indiana. After graduating from high school in 1968, Pauley attended Indiana University Bloomington, majoring in political science. She was a member of Kappa Kappa Gamma where she sang with the sorority jug band, the Kappa Pickers. She graduated with a B.A. in Political Science in 1972.

After three years at WISH-TV, in 1975, Pauley joined veteran anchor Floyd Kalber at NBC affiliate WMAQ-TV to become Chicago's first woman co-anchor on a major evening newscast, marking the beginning of her career with NBC. Barely ten months later, Pauley was chosen to replace Barbara Walters on the Today show.

== Career ==
=== Today ===
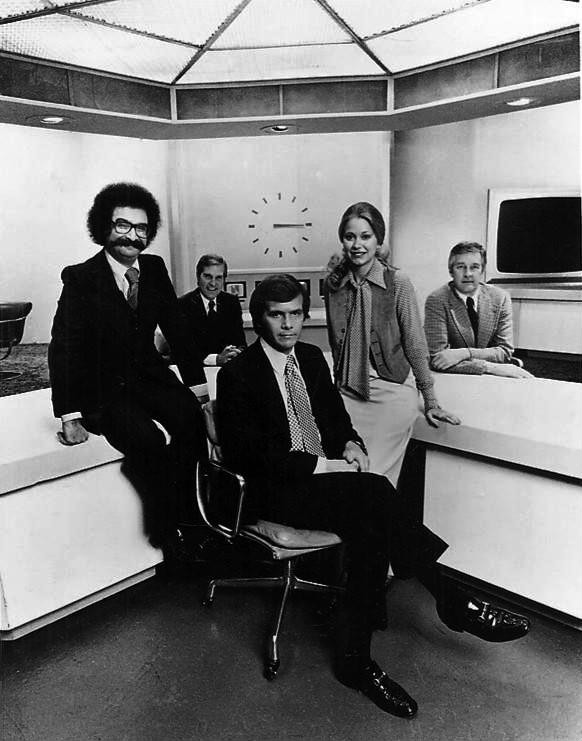
Pauley with the cast of the Today show, 1976

Pauley co-hosted the Today show from October 11, 1976, to December 29, 1989; first with Tom Brokaw from 1976 to December 1981 and then with Bryant Gumbel beginning January 4, 1982. She also anchored the Sunday edition of NBC Nightly News from 1980 to 1982; and often substituted for the weekend editions 1996–1999. Following in the footsteps of the first female co-anchor of the show, Barbara Walters, she became a symbol for professional women, and more specifically, female journalists. In 1983, after giving birth to twins following a very public pregnancy, Pauley became a role model to working mothers. In her autobiography, And So It Goes, Pauley's colleague Linda Ellerbee wrote, "She [Pauley] is what I want to be when I grow up." The Detroit Free Press wrote on September 27, 1989, that Jane Pauley in some ways represents the best of women in television, that she never took it too seriously, that she knew the difference between television and real life, and that her family counted more than her ratings.

1989 brought big changes to Today when news reader Deborah Norville was given a larger role in the two hour broadcast. Speculation in the media implied that NBC executives were easing Pauley out to advance the younger NBC newscaster. As Tom Shales of The Washington Post wrote at the time, watching Ms. Pauley, Ms. Norville, and co-anchor Bryant Gumbel on the set together "is like looking at a broken marriage with the home-wrecker right there on the premises."

Pauley, who had been contemplating a change, hoping to spend more time with her three children, asked to settle her contract, but NBC declined. In October 1989, after prolonged negotiations, Pauley announced that, after 13 years, she would leave the Today show in December, but would soon begin working on other projects at NBC. Public reaction amid the perception that Pauley was being cast aside for a younger woman was swift and consequential. As The New York Times reported on February 26, 1990, in the three weeks since January 26, the Today show lost 10 percent of its audience. Since Jane Pauley left as co-host and Deborah Norville replaced her, the Today show had fallen from its leadership position in the competition among the three network morning shows to a distant second place, almost a full rating point behind ABC's Good Morning America.

A July 23, 1990 New York Magazine article entitled "Back From the Brink, Jane Pauley Has Become America's Favorite Newswoman" reported that from February 1989 to February 1990, Today experienced a ratings slump of 22% and the cost to the network and its affiliates was estimated by one insider at close to $10 million for the year.

After Pauley announced she was leaving Today, she received more than 4000 letters of support, including one from Michael Kinsley, then of The New Republic, which anointed her "heroine of my generation. The first Baby Boomer they tried to put out to pasture … and failed."

Pauley's image was run on the cover of many magazines those months, including the December 1989 cover of Life magazine with the headline "Our Loss, Her Dream: How Jane Pauley got what she wanted – time for her kids, prime time for herself". New York Magazine dubbed her "The Loved One" on its July 23, 1990 cover.

Pauley returned to the air in a March 13, 1990, NBC primetime special appropriately titled Changes: Conversations with Jane Pauley. As she said during the introduction, "Change is not always an option. Change is not always the right choice. But change is almost always the most interesting." According to The Washington Post, the one-hour broadcast won its Tuesday 10 pm time slot with a 13.3 national Nielsen rating and a 24 percent audience share.

In 1990, Pauley co-hosted the 42nd Primetime Emmy Awards, alongside Candice Bergen and Jay Leno, and began to serve as substitute anchor for NBC Nightly News.

The success of Changes launched five one-hour specials in the summer of 1990 called Real Life with Jane Pauley. They were also ratings hits, and in January 1991 NBC launched the half hour series Real Life with Jane Pauley on Sunday nights. The show was cancelled after one season in October 1991.

=== Dateline NBC ===
On March 31, 1992, NBC launched Dateline, its 18th attempt at a news magazine. Pauley co-anchored Dateline from 1992 to 2003 along with Stone Phillips. Dateline made its own news on February 9, 1993, when at the end of a regularly scheduled edition of Dateline, Pauley and Phillips delivered a public apology to General Motors on behalf of NBC as part of the settlement of a lawsuit regarding the failure to disclose the use of an incendiary device in a story about the safety of a General Motors pickup truck which aired on Dateline on November 17, 1992. Neither Pauley nor Phillips had any connection to the segment; an internal investigation resulted in the resignation of the NBC News president, along with the dismissal of Dateline's executive producer and others involved with the GM story. Dateline survived, went on to thrive, and at one point was on the air five nights a week.

In addition to her Dateline responsibilities, Pauley also anchored Time and Again, a half hour show airing on then-fledgling MSNBC that recounted major news stories with footage from the NBC News archives.

In 2003, Pauley surprised NBC by declining to renegotiate her expiring contract. Explaining her decision, Pauley said at the time, "I think women think a lot about cycles, biological and personal. This year another cycle came around: my contract was up. It seemed an opportunity to take a life audit. I keep walking by bookstores and seeing titles talking about second acts in life."

=== The Jane Pauley Show ===
Pauley's decision to leave Dateline resulted in the offer of a daytime talk show. In 2004, she returned to television as host of The Jane Pauley Show, a syndicated daytime talk show distributed by NBC Universal. Although The Jane Pauley Show never gained traction in the ratings and was canceled after one season, Pauley called it the hardest – and proudest – year of her professional life. "To try something that you've failed at is, in my experience, proving that you had the guts to try."

The same year Pauley launched her talk show, she published her bestselling memoir, Skywriting: A Life Out of the Blue, in which she made public her diagnosis of bipolar disorder. She said her choice to talk openly about the disorder is "the easiest decision I ever made." In the January 20, 2014, edition of Time magazine, she said, "Part of my advocacy is not talking about the stigma. It's real, but it doesn't help move us forward. My other message is, I take my meds every day. No holidays. I've not had a recurrence."

Following the show's cancellation, Pauley's appearances on television included leading a half-hour discussion on PBS's Depression: Out of the Shadows, which aired in May 2008. She also campaigned publicly for President Obama in her home state of Indiana in 2008, a year when she was not affiliated with any network news organization.

=== Return to Today ===
In March 2009, Pauley returned to the Today show as a contributor hosting a weekly segment, "Your Life Calling," sponsored by AARP, which profiled people throughout the country age 50+ who were reinventing their lives in new and different ways. The award-winning series was on the air through 2013 and culminated in Pauley's second New York Times best-seller, Your Life Calling: Reimagining the Rest of Your Life.

On December 30, 2013, Pauley, former Today co-host Bryant Gumbel, then-Today anchor Matt Lauer, and weather anchor Al Roker (who was live in Pasadena, California) reunited to co-host a special reunion edition of Today.

=== CBS ===
On April 27, 2014, following an appearance during a "where are they now" segment and interview on CBS Sunday Morning, Pauley began contributing to the show as a correspondent and occasional substitute host. Pauley has been a guest host on CBS This Morning and has also filled in for Scott Pelley on the CBS Evening News. It was announced on September 25, 2016, that Pauley would take over as host of CBS Sunday Morning following the retirement of Charles Osgood. "We first got to know Jane when we did a story about her on Sunday Morning," said Rand Morrison, the show's executive producer, in a statement. "Our viewers immediately responded by suggesting she belonged on Sunday Morning permanently. And – as is so often the case, they were right. She's a dedicated, experienced broadcast journalist. But – every bit as important – she's a delight to work with. A worthy successor – and a perfect fit."

Pauley began her role as host on October 9, 2016, nearly 40 years to the day since her debut on Today.

== Accolades ==
Pauley is the recipient of the 2024 Lifetime Achievement Award, along with 10 other News and Documentary Emmy Awards, throughout her career.

Walter Cronkite Award for Excellence in Journalism in 2007.

Radio-Television News Directors Association's Paul White Award for Lifetime Contribution to Electronic Journalism.

Edward R. Murrow Award for Outstanding Achievement.

Inducted into the Broadcast and Cable Hall of Fame in 1998.

Gracie Allen Award for Outstanding Achievement by an Individual from American Women in Radio and Television.

The first international Matrix Award from the Association for Women in Communications (1998).

The National Alliance on Mental Illness (NAMI) Rana and Ken Purdy Award.

Poynter Medal for Lifetime Achievement from the Poynter Institute in 2025.

== Personal life ==
Pauley married cartoonist Garry Trudeau, creator of Doonesbury, on June 14, 1980. They have three children and two grandchildren.

Pauley serves on the board of directors for the Children's Health Fund in New York City and is a member of the Board of Directors of The Mind Trust, an Indianapolis-based non-profit organization that supports education innovation and reform.

In 2009, Pauley lent her name to the Jane Pauley Community Health Center, a facility in collaboration between the Community Health Network and the Metropolitan School District of Warren Township, Indiana. The center serves local communities, including students and their families, regardless of insurance or income, with an emphasis on integrating medical, dental and behavioral health. There are 15 centers, most on the east side of Indianapolis where Pauley grew up.

== See also ==
- Broadcast journalism
- New Yorkers in journalism

Media offices
Preceded by Barbara Walters	The Today Show co-anchor October 11, 1976 – December 29, 1989	Succeeded by Deborah Norville
Preceded by None	Dateline NBC co-anchor 1992–2003	Succeeded by Ann Curry
Preceded by Charles Osgood	CBS News Sunday Morning anchor October 9, 2016 – present	Succeeded by Incumbent
