= Bart Peterson =

American mayor

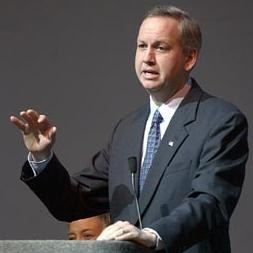

47th Mayor of Indianapolis
- In office January 1, 2000 – January 1, 2008
- Preceded by: Stephen Goldsmith
- Succeeded by: Greg Ballard

President of the National League of Cities
- In office 2007
- Preceded by: James C. Hunt
- Succeeded by: Cynthia McCollum

Personal details
- Born: Barton R. Peterson; June 15, 1958 (age 68) Indianapolis, Indiana, U.S.
- Party: Democratic
- Education: Purdue University; University of Michigan

Barton "Bart" R. Peterson (born June 15, 1958) is an American lawyer and politician who served as mayor of the U.S city of Indianapolis, Indiana. He is also a past president of the National League of Cities. A Democrat, he was first elected in 1999 and later defeated in 2007 in a bid for a third term in what was widely viewed as a huge upset.

== Early life and political career ==
A lifelong Indianapolis resident, Peterson graduated from North Central High School before attending Purdue University. After graduating from the University of Michigan Law School, he practiced law in Indianapolis for several years before joining the staff of Governor Evan Bayh, eventually serving as the Governor's Chief of Staff.

== Mayoralty (2000-2008) ==
Peterson announced his candidacy for mayor of Indianapolis in 1999 and defeated the Republican candidate, Indiana Secretary of State Sue Anne Gilroy, by 20,071 votes. When Peterson took office in 2000, he became Indianapolis's first Democratic mayor since 1967. Among his accomplishments during his first term were the establishment of charter schools in the city and development of several arts and culture initiatives.

Peterson was re-elected in 2003 by 37,409 votes, handily defeating Republican Marion County Treasurer Greg Jordan. During his second term, he led the efforts to consolidate city and county government, merging the Indianapolis Police Department with the Marion County Sheriff's Department to form the Indianapolis Metropolitan Police Department under the leadership of Marion County Sheriff Frank J. Anderson, and merging several township fire departments with the Indianapolis Fire Department. He also oversaw plans to construct a new home for the Indianapolis Colts while also expanding the Indiana Convention Center. Peterson is also credited for attracting additional downtown development including the construction of a downtown Simon Property Group headquarters and Conrad Hotel tower.

Peterson was expected to easily win re-election in 2007 as no well-known Republican candidates entered the race, leaving relatively unknown political newcomer Greg Ballard as his opposition. Due to high property taxes and a rising crime rate, several polls rated the race about even as election day approached. When voters went to the polls, Peterson lost to Ballard by 5,312 votes.

Prior to the election, both Democrats and Republicans considered Peterson a political star, and he had been mentioned as a candidate for governor or the United States Senate. The loss prompted many pundits to declare it the biggest political upset in Indiana history.

== Post Mayoralty ==
In December 2007, Peterson was mentioned as a possible candidate in the special election to fill the seat of recently deceased Congresswoman Julia Carson. A few days later, Peterson ruled out a run for the seat.

Harvard University's Institute of Politics hired Peterson as a resident fellow in January 2008. At Harvard he led study groups on urban politics that he confronted in his time as mayor, including building arts communities, education reform, sports facilities, and homelessness. Living Cities, a national philanthropic organization that conducts research and advocates on behalf of cities, selected Peterson as one of its first two Distinguished Urban Fellows in March 2008. Peterson remains involved in community activities in Indianapolis, particularly as the Chair of the Board of Directors for The Mind Trust, a nonprofit organization he founded in 2006 with his former charter schools director David Harris to promote entrepreneurship in education.

In June 2009, Peterson joined Eli Lilly and Company as senior vice president of corporate affairs and communications. This is the same position former Indiana Governor Mitch Daniels previously held.

== See also ==
- List of mayors of Indianapolis, Indiana
- 2007 Indianapolis mayoral election

Political offices
Preceded by Stephen Goldsmith	Mayor of Indianapolis; 2000–2008	Succeeded by Greg Ballard
