= 2026 Indiana Secretary of State election =

- November 3, 2026
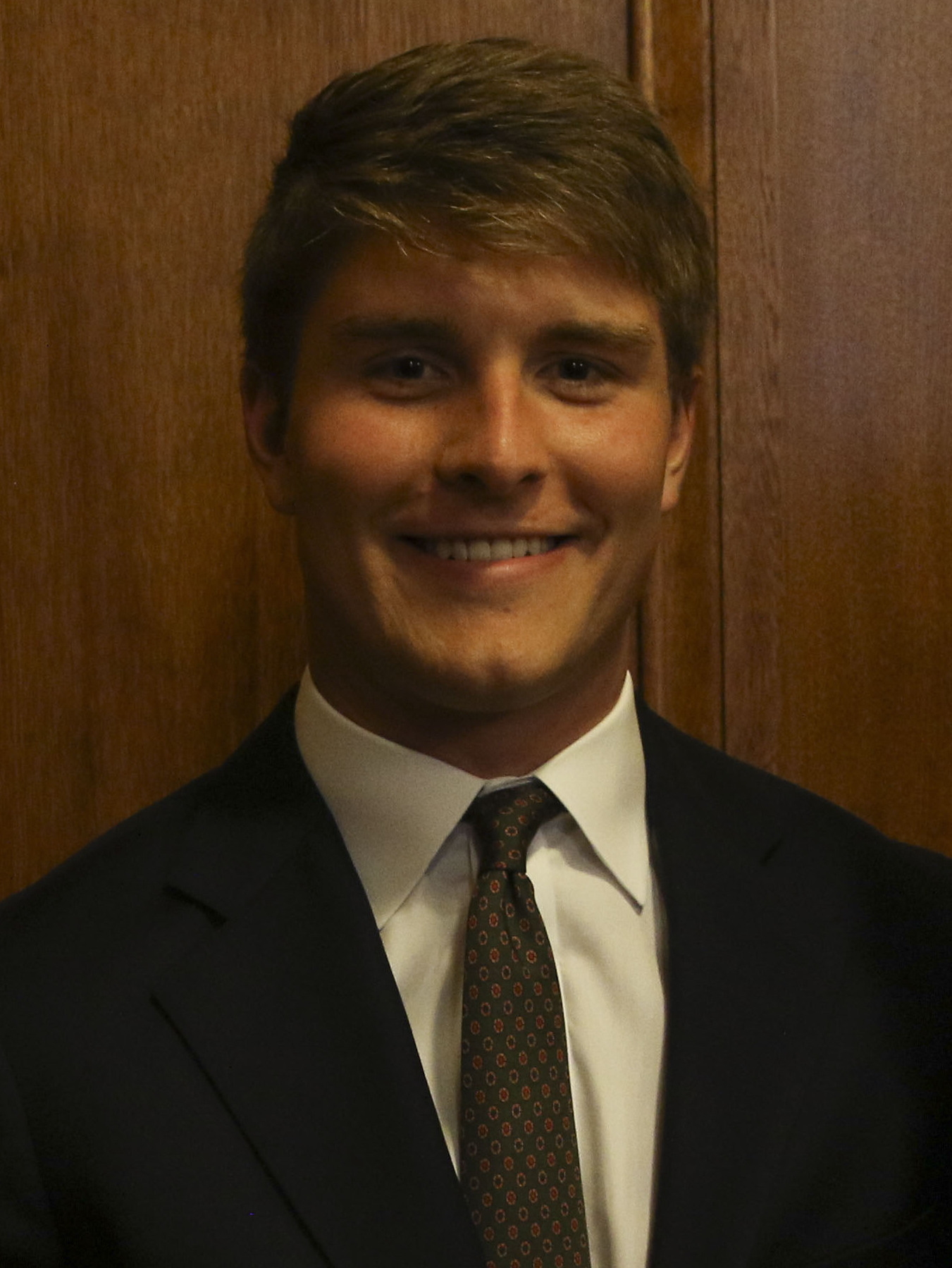

Candidate	Beau Bayh	Max Engling
Party	Democratic	Republican
Popular vote	1,007,815	829,083
Percentage	51.80%	42.61%
- Bayh: 40–50% 50–60% 60–70% 70–80% >90% Engling: 40–50% 50–60% 60–70% 70–80% >90%
Secretary of State before election
Diego Morales
Republican
Elected Secretary of State
Beau Bayh
Democratic

The 2026 Indiana Secretary of State election was held on November 3, 2026, to elect the secretary of state of Indiana. Incumbent Republican secretary of state Diego Morales ran for re-election, but was eliminated at the Republican convention by Max Engling. Democrat Beau Bayh, the son of former Indiana governor and Senator Evan Bayh and grandson of former senator Birch Bayh, won the race. This was the first time a Democrat was elected Indiana Secretary of State since Joe Hogsett in 1990, and the first statewide win for a Democrat since 2012, alongside the concurrent race for Indiana State Comptroller.

== Republican convention ==
=== Background ===
Incumbent Secretary of State Diego Morales faced criticism over several decisions during his tenure, including appointing his brother-in-law to a six-figure position, awarding more than $308,000 in employee bonuses, and awarding millions of dollars in no-bid technology contracts to companies whose executives had contributed to his campaign. He also faced scrutiny over overseas travel and the purchase of a $90,000 government vehicle. In March 2026, the Marion County Election Board referred Morales to the State Ethics Commission and State Inspector General for investigation over his campaign's use of footage from an official 2024 visit to the Marion County Election Service Center that included county election workers.

=== Candidates ===
==== Nominee ====
- Max Engling, political aide and candidate for IN-05 in 2024

==== Eliminated at convention ====
- Diego Morales, incumbent secretary of state (2023–present)
- Jamie Reitenour, businesswoman and 2024 gubernatorial candidate
- David Shelton, Knox County clerk (2019–present), Knox County Republican Party chair (2022–present), and 2022 secretary of state candidate

==== Declined ====
- Kyle Conrad, former Newton County clerk
- Andrew Ireland, state representative from the 90th district (2024–present) (endorsed Engling; lost re-election)

=== Campaign ===
Initially, Morales received the support of several prominent Indiana Republicans, including U.S. Senator Jim Banks and Attorney General Todd Rokita, who endorsed his reelection campaign. However, following his mounting controversies and concerns about the party's prospects in the general election, support for Morales began to erode. The emergence of Democrat Beau Bayh as the Democratic nominee, alongside former Indianapolis mayor Greg Ballard's independent candidacy, contributed to concerns among Republican leaders about retaining the office.

On May 20, 2026, Max Engling, a senior adviser to Banks, entered the Republican nomination contest. The following day, Banks and Rokita withdrew their endorsements of Morales and endorsed Engling instead. Rokita stated that he no longer believed Morales could win the general election, citing controversies surrounding his administration. Several other prominent Republicans, including State Treasurer Daniel Elliott and U.S. Representative Victoria Spartz, also backed Engling. Morales rejected calls to suspend his campaign and maintained that the nominee should be chosen by convention delegates.

=== Endorsements ===
Max Engling

U.S. senators

- Jim Banks, Indiana (2025–present)

U.S. representatives

- Jim Baird, IN-04 (2019–present)
- Erin Houchin, IN-09 (2023–present)
- Victoria Spartz, IN-05 (2021–2027)

Statewide officials

- Daniel Elliott, treasurer of Indiana (2023–present)

State legislators

- Andrew Ireland, state representative from the 90th district (2024–present)
Diego Morales

U.S. senators

- ~~Jim Banks, Indiana (2025–present)~~ (endorsement rescinded; later endorsed Engling)

Statewide officials

- ~~Todd Rokita, attorney general of Indiana (2021–present)~~ (endorsement rescinded)

Organizations

- Republicans for National Renewal
David Shelton

Statewide officials

- Connie Lawson, former secretary of state of Indiana (2012–2021)
Declined to endorse

Statewide officials

- Micah Beckwith, lieutenant governor of Indiana (2025–present)
- Mike Braun, governor of Indiana (2025–present)

=== Fundraising ===
Campaign finance reports as of April 15, 2026
Candidate	Raised	Spent	Cash on hand
Diego Morales (R)	$1,294,160	$95,042	$1,199,118
Jamie Reitenour(R)	$2,980	$79	$2,900
David Shelton (R)	$28,366	$24,682	$3,684
Source: Indiana Secretary of State

=== Results ===
Republican convention results
Candidate	Round 1		Round 2	
Candidate	Votes	%	Votes	%
Max Engling	715	42.7	867	53.3
David Shelton	543	32.4	627	38.5
Diego Morales	283	16.9	134	8.2
Jamie Reitenour	135	8.1	Eliminated	
Total ballots	1,676	100.00	1,628	100.00

== Democratic convention ==
=== Candidates ===
==== Nominee ====
- Beau Bayh, attorney and son of former senator Evan Bayh

==== Eliminated at convention ====
- Blythe Potter, business owner

=== Endorsements ===
Beau Bayh

Labor unions

- Central Midwest Regional Council of Carpenters
- Heat and Frost Insulators Local 18
- Indiana Laborers District Council
- Sheet Metal, Air, Rail and Transportation Workers Local 20
- United Association Local 440

Organizations

- VoteVets

Political parties

- Indiana Democratic Party
Blythe Potter

Organizations

- Vote Common Good

=== Fundraising ===
Campaign finance reports as of April 15, 2026
Candidate	Raised	Spent	Cash on hand
Beau Bayh (D)	$2,181,754	$207,655	$1,974,099
Blythe Potter (D)	$136,198	$69,594	$66,604
Source: Indiana Secretary of State

=== Results ===
Democratic convention results
Candidate	Round 1	
Candidate	Votes	%
Beau Bayh	1,385	61.00
Blythe Potter	883	39.00
Total ballots	2,269	100.00

== Third parties and independents ==
=== Libertarian Party ===
==== Nominee ====
- Lauri Shillings, business owner and nominee for Indiana's 5th congressional district in 2024

=== Lincoln Party ===
==== Declared ====
- Greg Ballard, former Republican mayor of Indianapolis (2008–2016)

=== Socialist Party of Indiana ===
==== Not on ballot ====
- Harrison Jacobo, activist (no ballot or write-in access)

=== Write-in candidates ===
- Andrew Delano, former Republican nominee for mayor of Gary, Indiana in 2023 (National Socialist American Workers Party)

== General election ==
Greg Ballard, the former Republican mayor of Indianapolis, ran on a ballot line for the recently founded Lincoln Party, seeking to gain ballot access for future elections. Earning 2% of the vote would make the party an official state party, and earning 10% would enable them to hold primary elections. Despite Indiana's status as a solidly Republican state, most observers considered the race to be highly competitive due to Ballard's presence, and due to his possibility to act as a spoiler in favor of Democratic candidate Beau Bayh, or even his ability to win the race outright. Ballard attracted support from across the political spectrum, including from Republicans disaffected by the MAGA movement and from Democrats frustrated by the party establishment. Ballard's presence on the ballot has also raised the political stakes for Libertarian candidate Lauri Shillings. Shillings also needs 2% of the vote to maintain her party's ballot line but can no longer rely on being the primary recipient of protest votes.

=== Predictions ===
Source	Ranking	As of
Sabato's Crystal Ball	Lean D (flip)	October 29, 2026

=== Post-convention endorsements ===
Max Engling (R)

Executive branch officials

- Donald Trump, president of the United States (2017–2021, 2025–present)
- JD Vance, vice president of the United States (2025–present)

Statewide officials

- Micah Beckwith, lieutenant governor of Indiana (2025–present)
- Mike Braun, governor of Indiana (2025–present)
Beau Bayh (D)

Executive branch officials

- Pete Buttigieg, former secretary of transportation (2021–2025)

State legislators

- Greg Walker, SD-41 (2006–present) (Republican)

Labor unions

- Indiana State AFL-CIO
- United Mine Workers of America COMPAC
Greg Ballard (I)

Statewide officials

- Sue Ellspermann, former lieutenant governor of Indiana (2013–2016) (Republican)

=== Fundraising ===
Campaign finance reports as of October 27, 2026
Candidate	Raised	Spent	Cash on hand
Max Engling (R)	$3,472,422.26	$3,306,085.81	$166,336.45
Beau Bayh (D)	$7,653,563.34	$7,497,086.18	$156,477.16
Greg Ballard (I)	$1,367,386.86	$1,287,523.94	$79,862.92
Lauri Shillings (L)	$60,067.19	$49,548.49	$10,518.70
Harrison Jacobo (S)	$0	$0	$0
Andrew Delano (NS)	$268.78	$268.78	$0
Source: Indiana Secretary of State

=== Debates ===
2026 Indiana Secretary of State debate
No.	Date	Host	Moderator	Link	Republican	Democratic	Lincoln	Libertarian
Key: P Participant A Absent N Not invited I Invited W Withdrawn								
Key: P Participant A Absent N Not invited I Invited W Withdrawn					Max Engling	Beau Bayh	Greg Ballard	Lauri Shillings
1	Aug. 26, 2026	Indy Chamber; FOX 59; CBS 4 IBJ Media	Dan Spehler & Leslie Weidenbener	Video	P	P	P	P
2	Oct. 7, 2026	Indiana Debate Commission	Laura Merrifield Wilson	Video	P	P	P	P
3	Oct. 22, 2026	FOX 59; CBS 4	Dan Spehler & Beairshelle Edmé	Video	P	P	N	N

=== Polling ===
Poll source	Date(s) administered	Sample size (Note: Key: A – all adults RV – registered voters LV – likely voters V – unclear)	Margin of error	Max Engling (R)	Beau Bayh (D)	Greg Ballard (I)	Lauri Shillings (L)	Undecided
Quantus Insights (R)	October 19–21, 2026	757 (LV)	± 3.8%	39%	42%	4%	2%	13%
Bellwether Research	October 8–11, 2026	896 (LV)	± 3.5%	35%	43%	5%	6%	11%
The Tarrance Group (R) (Note: Poll was sponsored by Hoosier Leadership for America, which supports Engling's campaign.)	September 27–30, 2026	600 (LV)	± 4.1%	38%	37%	5%	6%	14%
Schoen Cooperman Research (D) (Note: Poll was conducted by an insider in the Bayh campaign.)	September 1–3, 2026	605 (LV)	± 4.0%	36%	42%	5%	5%	12%

Hypothetical polling

Diego Morales vs. Beau Bayh vs. Greg Ballard

Poll source	Date(s) administered	Sample size	Margin of error	Diego Morales (R)	Beau Bayh (D)	Greg Ballard (I)	Undecided
InAct LLC (Note: Poll was sponsored by Independent Indiana, which supports Ballard's campaign.)	October 24 – November 1, 2025	400 (LV)	± 4.9%	29%	32%	24%	16%

Generic Republican vs. generic Democrat vs. generic Independent

Poll source	Date(s) administered	Sample size	Margin of error	Generic Republican	Generic Democrat	Generic Independent	Undecided
InAct LLC	October 24 – November 1, 2025	400 (LV)	± 4.9%	44%	34%	10%	12%

=== Results ===
2026 Indiana Secretary of State election
Party	Candidate	Votes	%	±%
Democratic	Beau Bayh	1,006,139	51.77	+11.56
Republican	Max Engling	828,418	42.63	–11.5
Lincoln	Greg Ballard	70,040	3.60	N/A
Libertarian	Lauri Shillings	38,627	1.99	–3.67
Write-in		112	0.01	+0.01
Total votes		1,943,336	100.0	
Democratic gain from Republican				

Counties that flipped from Republican to Democratic

- Allen (largest municipality: Fort Wayne)
- Bartholomew (largest municipality: Columbus)
- Boone (largest municipality: Zionsville)
- Clark (largest municipality: Jeffersonville)
- Delaware (largest municipality: Muncie)
- Floyd (largest municipality: New Albany)
- Hamilton (largest municipality: Carmel)
- Hendricks (largest municipality: Plainfield)
- LaPorte (largest municipality: Michigan City)
- Madison (largest municipality: Anderson)
- Perry (largest municipality: Tell City)
- Porter (largest municipality: Portage)
- Vanderburgh (largest municipality: Evansville)
- Vigo (largest municipality: Terre Haute)

==== By congressional district ====
Bayh won five of nine congressional districts, including two that elected Republicans.

District	Bayh	Engling	Representative
1st	61.1%	35.9%	Frank J. Mrvan
2nd	48.2%	47.5%	Rudy Yakym
3rd	44.9%	49.9%	Marlin Stutzman
4th	47.2%	45.7%	Jim Baird
5th	51.1%	42.5%	J. D. Ford
6th	46.1%	46.7%	Jefferson Shreve
7th	76.1%	16.5%	André Carson
8th	45.1%	49.8%	Mark Messmer
9th	46.2%	49.3%	Erin Houchin

== Notes ==
Partisan clients
