= 2011 Indianapolis mayoral election =

- November 8, 2011
- Turnout: 29.98% ▲3.66pp
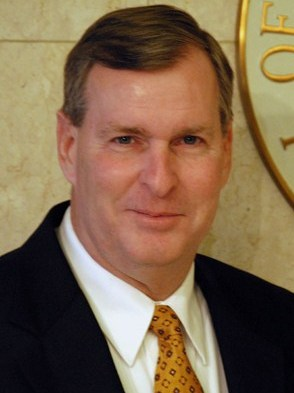

Nominee	Greg Ballard	Melina Kennedy
Party	Republican	Democratic
Popular vote	92,499	84,968
Percentage	51.3%	47.1%
- Precinct results Ballard: 40–50% 50–60% 60–70% 70–80% 80–90% >90% Kennedy: 40–50% 50–60% 60–70% 70–80% 80–90% >90% No votes
Mayor before election
Greg Ballard
Republican
Elected mayor
Greg Ballard
Republican

The Indianapolis mayoral election of 2011 took place on November 8, 2011. Voters elected the Mayor of Indianapolis, members of the Indianapolis City-County Council, as well as several other local officials. Incumbent Republican Greg Ballard was seeking a second term. Democrats nominated former deputy mayor Melina Kennedy to run against Ballard. Ballard defeated Kennedy 51% to 47%.

The Indianapolis City-County elections took place alongside the mayoral election, with Democrats taking a 16–13 majority. This marked the first time in Indianapolis history that a Republican mayor would lead with a Democratic council.

As of the 2023 election, this is the last time a Republican was elected Mayor of Indianapolis.

== Candidates ==
=== Republican party ===
- Greg Ballard, incumbent mayor

=== Democratic party ===
- Melina Kennedy, former Deputy Mayor for Economic Development

==== Defeated in the primary ====
- Sam Carson
- Ron Gibson
- Brian Williams

==== Removed from ballot ====
- Bob Kern

=== Libertarian party ===
- Chris Bowen

== Campaign ==
Melina Kennedy was described as the "overwhelming favorite" to win the Democratic primary, and succeeded in doing so.

The campaign was the most expensive in Indianapolis history, with the candidates raising a combined $6 million. Representative André Carson, Sam Carson's nephew, endorsed Melina Kennedy. Kennedy was also endorsed by The Indianapolis Star and the Indianapolis Fraternal Order of Police.

=== Polling ===
Poll source	Date(s) administered	Sample size	Margin of error	Greg Ballard (R)	Melina Kennedy (D)	Other	Undecided
EPIC-MRA	October 29–31, 2011	400	± 4.9%	44%	33%	—	23%

== Election results ==
Indianapolis mayoral election, 2011
Party	Candidate	Votes	%	±%
Republican	Greg Ballard (incumbent)	92,499	51.3%	+0.9%
Democratic	Melina Kennedy	84,968	47.1%	−0.1%
Libertarian	Christopher Bowen	2,676	1.5	−0.8
No party	Write-Ins	124	0.1	—
Turnout		181,168	29.9	+3.7
Majority		7,531	4.2	
Republican hold		Swing		

Preceded by 2007	Indianapolis mayoral election 2011	Succeeded by 2015
