= The Mind Trust =

Non-profit organisation in the USA

- Formation: 2006
- Founders: Bart Peterson; David Harris
- Headquarters: Indianapolis, Indiana
- Website: https://www.themindtrust.org/

The Mind Trust is an American nonprofit organization based in Indianapolis, United States focused on the education sector. Founded in 2006, its mission is to "dramatically improve public education for underserved students by empowering education entrepreneurs to develop or expand transformative education initiatives."

== History ==
The Mind Trust was founded in 2006 by Bart Peterson, the former mayor of Indianapolis, and David Harris, former charter schools director for Indianapolis. The organization was founded as an outgrowth of Peterson's charter schools initiative. In 2001, the Mayor of Indianapolis became the nation's only mayor with the authority to charter schools. In July 2006, the initiative won Harvard University's Innovations in American Government Award.

The summer 2007 issue of Education Next, a publication of the Hoover Institution described The Mind Trust's formation in an article by David Skinner:

In January, David Harris left the mayor's office to work on another side of the charter school problem: 'stimulating supply,' as he puts it. If Indianapolis is going to continue being a leader in school innovation, it must, Harris reasons, become the place to develop new ideas. So he has built a nonprofit—IPS superintendent White, among others, sits on the board—to fund highly paid fellowships for education entrepreneurs. It is called [The] Mind Trust, and along with trying to find the next Michael Feinberg (a co-founder of KIPP) or the next Wendy Kopp (founder of Teach For America), Harris will be trying to draw the cream of education reform organizations to establish a presence in Indianapolis.

== Programs ==
To achieve its mission, The Mind Trust has three strategies: (1) the Education Entrepreneur Fellowship that serves as an incubator for transformative education ventures; (2) a Venture Fund to recruit to Indianapolis the nation's most successful entrepreneurial education initiatives; and (3) a Charter School Incubator that awards $1,000,000 in funding as well as support and training to leadership teams who intend to start networks of charter schools in Indianapolis.

The Education Entrepreneur Fellowship offers promising education entrepreneurs the opportunity to develop and launch their break-the-mold education ventures. Fellows receive two years of support ($90,000 per year in salary, full benefits, a $20,000 stipend, etc.) The Mind Trust has selected six Fellows since its inception. Fellows and their programs include Dr. Michael Bitz and Youth Music Exchange, Dr. Celine Coggins and Teach Plus, Ms. Abigail Falik and Global Citizen Year, Earl Martin Phalen and Summer Advantage USA, Stephanie Saroki de Garcia and Seton Education Partners, and Jesse Hahnel and FosterEd. John Ketzenberger, the business columnist for the Indianapolis Star, wrote about the Fellowship in a column on May 20, 2008:

Indianapolis is on the vanguard of the education reform movement. Really. A big reason is The Mind Trust, a local nonprofit, and its Education Entrepreneur Fellowship.

The Mind Trust has used the Venture Fund to bring Teach For America, The New Teacher Project, pilotED Schools, College Summit Diploma Plus, and Stand for Children to Indianapolis. The Mind Trust has invested over $5 million in the organizations they have recruited through the Venture Fund.

The Charter School Incubator is the newest initiative of The Mind Trust. In 2012 the Incubator will award three to four $1,000,000 start-up grants to leadership teams that intend to launch networks of charter schools in Indianapolis. The deadline for the first application round is February 17, 2012, and awards will be made by June 2012. The editorial staff of the Indianapolis Business Journal wrote about the Incubator in a column on October 15, 2011:

If a meaningful turnaround in public education is going to happen here, it’s going to come from the fresh ideas and innovative thinking the [Charter School Incubator] grants are trying to leverage. Getting the desired results won’t be easy, but the odds improve when groups such as The Mind Trust make their bold moves.

== Organization ==
The organization is chaired by Bart Peterson, with Davis Harris serving as a board member and vice president. The organization's chief executive is Brandon Brown.
