= 2007 Indianapolis City-County Council election =

Indianapolis City-County Council elections, 2007
- November 6, 2007

All 29 seats on the Indianapolis City-County Council 15 seats needed for a majority
	Majority party	Minority party
Party	Republican	Democratic
Seats before	14	15
Seats won	16	13

The 2007 Indianapolis City–County Council elections took place on November 6, 2007. All 29 seats were up for re-election, 25 districts and 4 at-large seats, on the Indianapolis City–County Council. Seven of the seats were unopposed, 4 held by Democrats and 3 held by Republicans. Prior to the elections Democrats held a 15–14-seat majority. Following the elections Republicans gained control of the council with a 16–13 majority.

The Indianapolis mayoral election took place alongside the council elections.

== Results by district ==
The following are the final results from the Marion County Clerk, Beth White.

City-County Council District 1
Party	Candidate	Votes	%	±%
Democratic	José Evans	3,820	49.3%	
Republican	Bruce Henry	3,703	47.8%	
Libertarian	Margaret Kantz	225	2.9%	
Turnout		7,748		
Democratic gain from Republican		Swing		

City-County Council District 2
Party	Candidate	Votes	%	±%
Democratic	Angela Mansfield (incumbent)	3,902	52.1%	
Republican	Bruce Schumacher	3,592	47.9%	
Turnout		7,494		
Democratic hold		Swing		

City-County Council District 3
Party	Candidate	Votes	%	±%
Republican	Ryan Vaughn (incumbent)	6,228	64.4%	
Democratic	Cody Kendall	3,448	35.6%	
Turnout		9,676		
Republican hold		Swing		

City-County Council District 4
Party	Candidate	Votes	%	±%
Republican	Christine Scales	4,751	51.3%	
Democratic	Carey Hamilton	4,507	48.7%	
Turnout		9,258		
Republican hold		Swing		

City-County Council District 5
Party	Candidate	Votes	%	±%
Republican	Virginia Cain	6,094	100.0%	
Turnout		6,094		
Republican hold		Swing		

City-County Council District 6
Party	Candidate	Votes	%	±%
Republican	Janice McHenry	3,307	60.3%	
Democratic	Frank Scott, Jr.	2,176	39.7%	
Turnout		5,483		
Republican hold		Swing		

City-County Council District 7
Party	Candidate	Votes	%	±%
Democratic	Cherrish Pryor (incumbent)	3,496	100.0%	
Turnout		3,496		
Democratic hold		Swing		

City-County Council District 8
Party	Candidate	Votes	%	±%
Democratic	Monroe Gray, Jr. (incumbent)	4,848	57.1%	
Republican	Kurt Webber	3,650	42.9%	
Turnout		8,498		
Democratic hold		Swing		

City-County Council District 9
Party	Candidate	Votes	%	±%
Democratic	Jackie Nytes (incumbent)	4,849	100.0%	
Turnout		4,849		
Democratic hold		Swing		

City-County Council District 10
Party	Candidate	Votes	%	±%
Democratic	William Oliver (incumbent)	3,269	100.0%	
Turnout		3,269		
Democratic hold		Swing		

City-County Council District 11
Party	Candidate	Votes	%	±%
Democratic	Paul Bateman (incumbent)	4,402	60.1%	
Republican	Michael Healy	2,929	39.9%	
Turnout		7,331		
Democratic hold		Swing		

City-County Council District 12
Party	Candidate	Votes	%	±%
Republican	Michael McQuillen	4,444	57.8%	
Democratic	Sherron Franklin (incumbent)	3,247	42.2%	
Turnout		7,691		
Republican gain from Democratic		Swing		

City-County Council District 13
Party	Candidate	Votes	%	±%
Republican	Robert Lutz (incumbent)	3,895	65.8%	
Democratic	Anna Peay	1,865	31.6%	
Libertarian	Bob Djordjevich	156	2.6%	
Turnout		5,916		
Republican hold		Swing		

City-County Council District 14
Party	Candidate	Votes	%	±%
Republican	Mariliyn Pfisterer (incumbent)	2,358	61.2%	
Democratic	Gloria Jean Harvey	1,494	38.8%	
Turnout		3,852		
Republican hold		Swing		

City-County Council District 15
Party	Candidate	Votes	%	±%
Democratic	André Carson (incumbent)	3,704	100.0%	
Turnout		3,704		
Democratic hold		Swing		

City-County Council District 16
Party	Candidate	Votes	%	±%
Democratic	Brian Mahern	1,911	61.5%	
Republican	Scott Keller (incumbent)	1,092	35.1%	
Libertarian	Paul Dijak-Robinson	107	3.4%	
Turnout		3,110		
Democratic gain from Republican		Swing		

City-County Council District 17
Party	Candidate	Votes	%	±%
Democratic	Mary Moriarty Adams (incumbent)	2,846	51.9%	
Republican	Gary Whitmore	2,639	48.1%	
Turnout		5,485		
Democratic hold		Swing		

City-County Council District 18
Party	Candidate	Votes	%	±%
Democratic	Vernon Brown (incumbent)	2,725	56.6%	
Republican	Adam Longworth	2,086	43.4%	
Turnout		4,811		
Democratic hold		Swing		

City-County Council District 19
Party	Candidate	Votes	%	±%
Democratic	Dane Mahern (incumbent)	1,666	51.6%	
Republican	Harry Liggett	1,563	48.4%	
Turnout		3,229		
Democratic hold		Swing		

City-County Council District 20
Party	Candidate	Votes	%	±%
Republican	N. Susie Day (incumbent)	2,962	54.0%	
Democratic	Keric Fitzgerald	2,319	42.3%	
Libertarian	Barry Campbell	201	3.7%	
Turnout		5,482		
Republican hold		Swing		

City-County Council District 21
Party	Candidate	Votes	%	±%
Republican	Benjamin Hunter (incumbent)	5,015	64.4%	
Democratic	Joe Billerman	2,770	35.6%	
Turnout		7,785		
Republican hold		Swing		

City-County Council District 22
Party	Candidate	Votes	%	±%
Republican	Bob Cockrum (incumbent)	4,577	64.9%	
Democratic	Steve Terrell	2,252	32.0%	
Libertarian	Mohinder Dindiyal	217	3.1%	
Turnout		7,046		
Republican hold		Swing		

City-County Council District 23
Party	Candidate	Votes	%	±%
Republican	Jeff Cardwell (incumbent)	4,893	73.4%	
Democratic	Earl Williams	1,774	26.6%	
Turnout		6,667		
Republican hold		Swing		

City-County Council District 24
Party	Candidate	Votes	%	±%
Republican	Mike Speedy (incumbent)	5,215	100.0%	
Turnout		5,215		
Republican hold		Swing		

City-County Council District 25
Party	Candidate	Votes	%	±%
Republican	Lincoln Plowman (incumbent)	7,666	100.0%	
Turnout		7,666		
Republican hold		Swing		

City-County Council At-large
Party	Candidate	Votes	%	±%
Republican	Kent Smith	80,708	12.9%	
Republican	Barbara Malone	77,485	12.4%	
Democratic	Joanne Sanders (incumbent)	73,180	11.8%	
Republican	Ed Coleman	72,495	11.6%	
Republican	Michael Hegg	71,782	11.5%	
Democratic	Rozelle Boyd (incumbent)	71,267	11.5%	
Democratic	Ron Gibson (incumbent)	70,130	11.3%	
Democratic	Lonnell Conley (incumbent)	63,831	10.2%	
Libertarian	Allison Maguire	12,735	2.0%	
Libertarian	Timothy Maguire	12,275	2.0%	
Libertarian	Kevin Fleming	9,349	1.5%	
Libertarian	Webster Smith	8,260	1.3%	
Turnout		623,497		

Preceded by 2003	Indianapolis City-County Council elections 2007	Succeeded by 2011
