= 1999 Indianapolis mayoral election =

- November 2, 1999
- Turnout: 36.98% ▲10.47pp
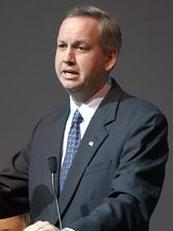

Nominee	Bart Peterson	Sue Anne Gilroy
Party	Democratic	Republican
Popular vote	103,128	83,057
Percentage	52.58%	42.35%
Mayor before election
Stephen Goldsmith
Republican
Elected mayor
Bart Peterson
Democratic

The Indianapolis mayoral election of 1999 took place on November 2, 1999. Voters elected the Mayor of Indianapolis, members of the Indianapolis City-County Council, as well as several other local officials. Democrat Bart Peterson was the first Democrat to be elected as Mayor of Indianapolis since 1963.

== Primaries ==
Primaries were held on May 4.

=== Democratic primary ===
Indianapolis mayoral election, 1999
Party	Candidate	Votes	%
Democratic	Bart Peterson	21,117	72.25
Democratic	Jocelyn Tandy-Adande	6,138	21.00
Democratic	Tim Perkins	1,974	6.75
Majority		14,979	51.25
Turnout		29,229	

=== Republican primary ===
Indianapolis mayoral election, 2007
Party	Candidate	Votes	%
Republican	Sue Anne Gilroy	28,683	62.13
Republican	Robert L. "Bob" Parker	15,346	33.24
Republican	Karan Beck	1,572	3.41
Republican	Erick Lynn Gordon	562	1.22
Majority		13,337	28.89
Turnout		46,163	

== Election results ==
Indianapolis mayoral election, 1999
Party	Candidate	Votes	%
Democratic	Bart Peterson	103,128	52.58
Republican	Sue Anne Gilroy	83,057	42.35
Libertarian	Andrew Horning	7,725	3.94
Our Party	John Gibson	2,158	1.10
Independent	John Plemons (write-in)	67	0.03
Majority		20,071	10.23
Turnout		196,135	37
Democratic gain from Republican			

Preceded by 1995	Indianapolis mayoral election 1999	Succeeded by 2003
