= Lincoln Party =

Indiana political party

- Chairperson: Nathan Gotsch
- Founder: Nathan Gotsch
- Founded: 2026
- Ideology: Anti-corruption
- Political position: Big tent
- Colors: red, blue
- United States Senate delegation: 0 / 2
- United States House of Representatives delegation: 0 / 9
- Executive Offices: 0 / 7
- Indiana State Senate: 0 / 50
- Indiana House of Representatives: 0 / 100

Website
- thelincolnparty.org

The Lincoln Party is a big tent political party in Indiana. The party was founded by its chairperson Nathan Gotsch. The first time the party label saw use was when Greg Ballard ran for Secretary of State of Indiana in 2026. The party became an official minor party in Indiana when Ballard secured 3.6 percent of the vote, crossing the 2 percent threshold for automatic ballot access.

== History ==
The Lincoln Party was created with the intent of allowing more independent candidates to run in Indiana by bypassing the need for potential candidates to gather signatures in order to appear on election ballots. According to Ballard, the party's name was chosen in order to honor Abraham Lincoln's upbringing in Indiana.

In the 2026 Indiana Secretary of State election, the Lincoln Party gained above 2% of the vote, giving the party automatic ballot access for the next 4 years. In response to gaining ballot access, Ballard remarked that "a permanent challenge has been born" to the two-party dynamic in Indiana politics. Post-election, Gotsch stated that the Lincoln Party intends to run candidates in future local Indiana elections, possibly including the 2027 Indianapolis mayoral election if Indianapolis Mayor Joe Hogsett runs for re-election.

== Platform ==
The Lincoln Party's platform consists of a set of principles rather than a set political platform. The party's official platform, titled 'Statement of principles', states the party's support for civil rights, democracy, and the American constitution. Chairperson Nathan Gotsch has stated that the lack of outlined policy does not mean that the party's candidates have no policies, but rather that specific policies and positions are up to each candidate.
