= Beau Bayh =

American politician (born 1995)

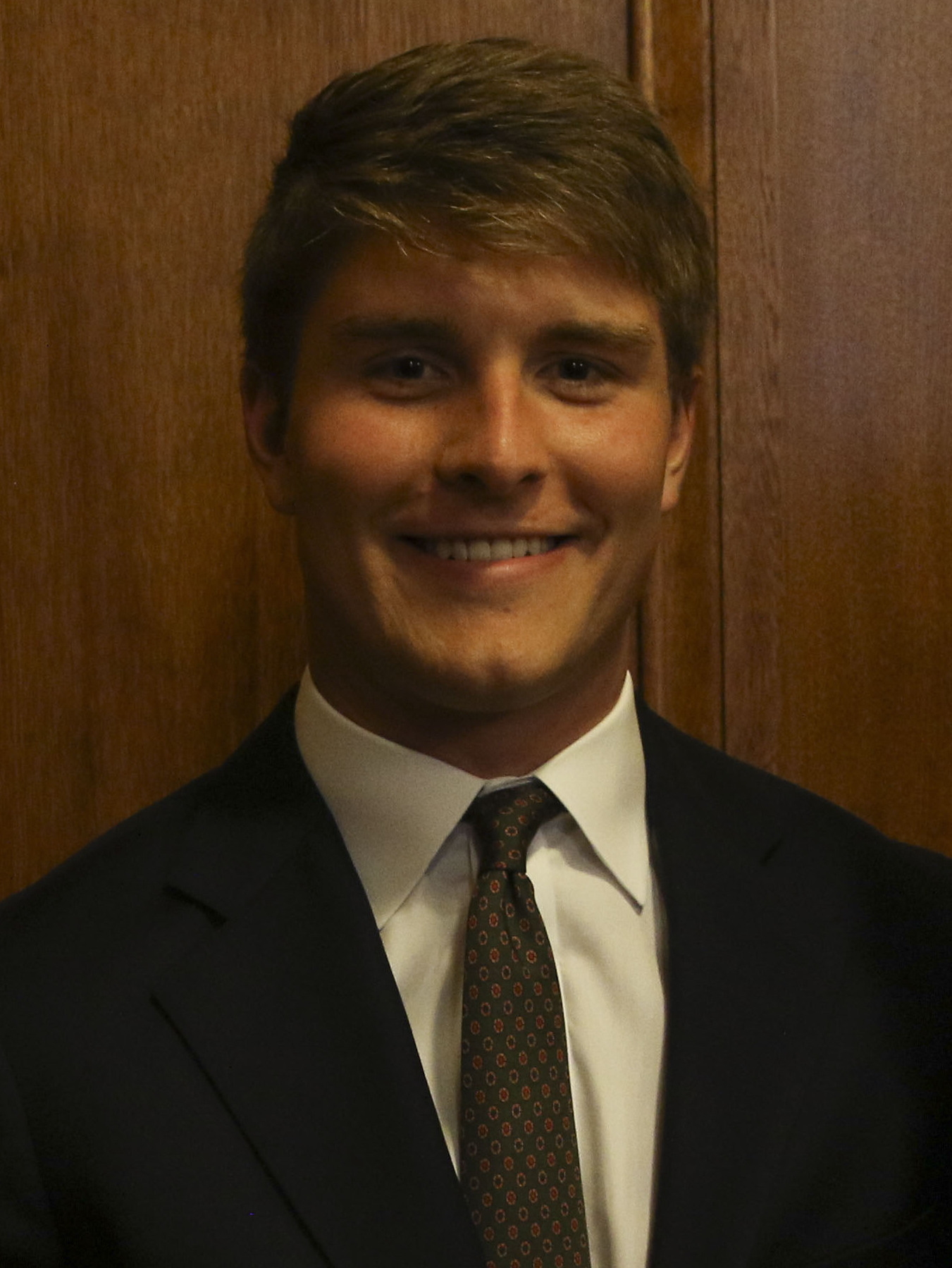
- Bayh in 2018

Secretary of State–elect of Indiana
- Assuming office January 1, 2027
- Governor: Mike Braun
- Succeeding: Diego Morales

Personal details
- Born: Birch Evans Bayh IV; November 8, 1995 (age 31) Indianapolis, Indiana, U.S.
- Party: Democratic
- Parents: Evan Bayh (father); Susan Bayh (mother)
- Relatives: Birch Bayh (grandfather); Marvella Bayh (grandmother)
- Education: Harvard University (BA, JD)
- Website: Campaign website

Military service
- Branch/service: United States Marine Corps
- Service years: 2018–2023
- Rank: Captain

Birch Evans "Beau" Bayh IV (/baɪ/ BY; born November 8, 1995) is an American attorney and politician who is the Secretary of State–elect of Indiana. A member of the Democratic Party, he is the son of former Indiana governor and senator Evan Bayh, and grandson of former senator Birch Bayh.

Bayh was elected Indiana Secretary of State in 2026, defeating Republican nominee Max Engling with 51.8% of the vote.

== Early life and education ==
Bayh and his twin brother, Nick, were born on November 8, 1995, at St. Vincent Indianapolis Hospital to Susan and Evan Bayh, while Evan served as governor of Indiana. Evan was elected to the U.S. Senate in 1998, and the family moved to Washington, D.C. where Bayh spent most of his childhood.

Bayh graduated from St. Albans School and enrolled at Harvard University, where he played for the Harvard Crimson lacrosse team. During his time at Harvard, he interned in the office of Joe Biden, then vice president of the United States. He graduated in 2018.

== Career ==
After graduating from Harvard, Bayh was commissioned in the United States Marine Corps. Following the 2022 Russian invasion of Ukraine, Bayh was deployed to Europe. He was honorably discharged at the rank of captain in 2023.

Bayh earned a Juris Doctor from Harvard Law School, then moved to Westfield, Indiana, to study for the bar exam in 2024. After he passed, he moved to Bloomington, Indiana, where he clerked for David F. Hamilton of the United States Court of Appeals for the Seventh Circuit until August 2025. Bayh then moved to Indianapolis and joined MacGill Law.

In October 2025, Bayh announced his candidacy for secretary of state of Indiana in the 2026 elections. He won the Democratic Party nomination at their state convention in June 2026. In the November general election, Bayh defeated Republican Max Engling, independent Greg Ballard, and Libertarian Lauri Shillings, becoming the first Democrat to hold the position since Joe Hogsett in 1994.

Party political offices
Preceded by Destiny Wells	Democratic nominee for Secretary of State of Indiana; 2026	Most recent
Political offices
Preceded by Diego Morales	Secretary of State of Indiana; Taking office 2027	Elect
