= The Jane Pauley Show =

US television program

- Genre: Talk show
- Presented by: Jane Pauley
- Country of origin: United States
- Original language: English
- No. of seasons: 1

Production
- Executive producer: Michael Weisman
- Camera setup: Multi-camera
- Running time: 48 minutes
- Production companies: Michael Weisman Productions; Polliwog Media; NBC Universal Television Distribution

Original release
- Network: Syndication
- Release: August 30, 2004 – May 25, 2005

The Jane Pauley Show is an American syndicated talk show packaged by NBC Universal, hosted by veteran journalist Jane Pauley. The show premiered on August 30, 2004.

Pauley and other people involved with the show, before its premiere, were not aware of how she would adapt to the medium. Pauley has shown that she can handle serious interviews (from her experience on Today and Dateline NBC), but it was not immediately evident if she could hold her own in a medium which is heavily laden with impersonality.

The show's ratings were not impressive, and the show was canceled, with the final episode airing in May 2005.

The show was broadcast from Studio 8G in 30 Rockefeller Center, which had formerly housed a succession of syndicated talk shows including The Phil Donahue Show, The Rosie O'Donnell Show, and The Caroline Rhea Show. Studio 8G was also previously home to The Today Show for a period in the late 1970s and early 1980s.
