= Jeff Cardwell =

American politician (born 1959)

Chair of the Indiana Republican Party
- In office April 1, 2015 – January 21, 2017
- Preceded by: Tim Berry
- Succeeded by: Kyle Hupfer

Member of the Indianapolis City-County Council from the 23rd district
- In office January 1, 2008 – January 7, 2013
- Preceded by: Phil Borst
- Succeeded by: Jefferson Shreve

Personal details
- Born: December 7, 1959 (age 66) Morgantown, Kentucky
- Party: Republican
- Spouse: Cheryl
- Children: 3
- Education: Indiana Wesleyan University
- Website: Official website

Jeff Cardwell (born December 7, 1959) is an American politician from the state of Indiana. A member of the Republican Party, he previously served as Chairman of the Indiana Republican Party. Cardwell ran for the Indianapolis City-County Council in 2007 and won. He replaced Phil Borst. He won reelection in 2011 and served on the City Council until January 7, 2013. He previously served as a Senior Advisor to then Governor Mike Pence from January 14, 2013 to March 31, 2015.
