= Greg Ballard =

American politician (born 1954)

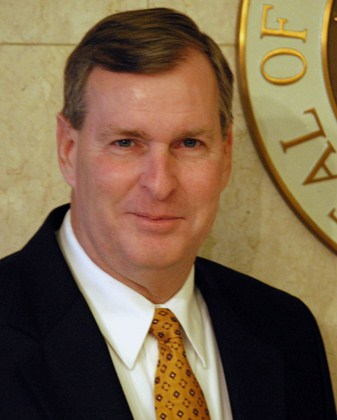
- Ballard in 2008

48th Mayor of Indianapolis
- In office January 1, 2008 – January 1, 2016
- Preceded by: Bart Peterson
- Succeeded by: Joe Hogsett

Personal details
- Born: Gregory Alan Ballard; November 20, 1954 (age 72) Indianapolis, Indiana, U.S.
- Party: Lincoln Party (2026–present); Republican (before 2026)
- Spouse: Winnie Ballard
- Children: 2
- Education: Indiana University, Bloomington (BA); Marine Corps University (MA)

Military service
- Branch/service: United States Marine Corps
- Years of service: 1978–2001
- Rank: Lieutenant Colonel
- Battles/wars: Gulf War
- Awards: Legion of Merit; Meritorious Service Medal; Joint Service Commendation Medal; Marine Corps Expeditionary Medal; Kuwait Liberation Medal (Kuwait); Kuwait Liberation Medal (Saudi Arabia)

Gregory Alan Ballard (born November 20, 1954) is an American politician, author, and businessman who served as the 48th mayor of Indianapolis, Indiana. He is a retired Lieutenant Colonel from the United States Marine Corps.

On November 6, 2007, he defeated two-term incumbent Democratic Mayor Bart Peterson by 50% to 47%. It was described as one of the biggest upsets in the political history of Indiana. He was re-elected to the position in 2011 by a somewhat larger margin. He ran for Indiana Secretary of State in 2026 under the newly formed Lincoln Party. He currently is a part of Secretary of State–elect of Indiana Beau Bayh's transitional advisory team.

== Early life and education ==
Ballard was born at Methodist Hospital of Indianapolis, on November 20, 1954, to Duard and Mary Ballard. He was born and raised in Indianapolis. He graduated from Cathedral High School, a Roman Catholic school. Ballard earned a bachelor's degree in economics from Indiana University Bloomington, where he was a member of Delta Tau Delta, a social fraternity.

== Career ==
After graduating, he joined the United States Marine Corps. He continued his education while serving in the Marines, becoming a distinguished graduate of the Marine Corps Command and Staff College, and attained a master's degree in military science from the Marine Corps University, which included operations analysis studies. While stationed in California, he met his future wife Winnie. He later was transferred to Okinawa, Japan.

He served in the first Gulf War. His military career culminated in his service with the United States European Command in Stuttgart, Germany, where he retired in 2001 with 23 years of service. During his service, he earned the Legion of Merit, Meritorious Service Medal, Joint Service Commendation Medal, Marine Corps Expeditionary Medal, and both the Saudi and the Kuwaiti versions of the Kuwait Liberation Medal.

Beginning in 2001, Ballard worked for Bayer in Indianapolis, before teaching seminars at Indiana Business College and later becoming self-employed as a leadership and management consultant.

== Campaign for Mayor of Indianapolis ==
Ballard was the only Republican to file for mayor, as few members of the city's once-dominant Republican Party were willing to run against Peterson. Ballard was dramatically outspent by Peterson. He had only $300,000 in campaign funds and low name recognition when he began the race. In comparison, Peterson already had $2.9 million in April while Ballard had only $9,560 at the time.

As late as October 14, Ballard had run no television ads. An October 19 campaign finance report showed that Peterson had raised $1.5 million since April and still had that much on hand to spend. At that point, Ballard had only $51,000 left, meaning Peterson had 30 times the funds that Ballard had during the last three weeks of the campaign.

On November 6, 2007, Ballard defeated Mayor Peterson 50% to 47%, a difference of 5,312 votes. Unhappiness with rapidly increasing taxes and crime were seen as the biggest reasons for Peterson's defeat. Republicans also recaptured control of the City-County Council for the first time in four years. In his acceptance speech, Ballard told the audience he considers this campaign "the classic, if not the ultimate, example of grassroots politics".

== Mayoralty ==
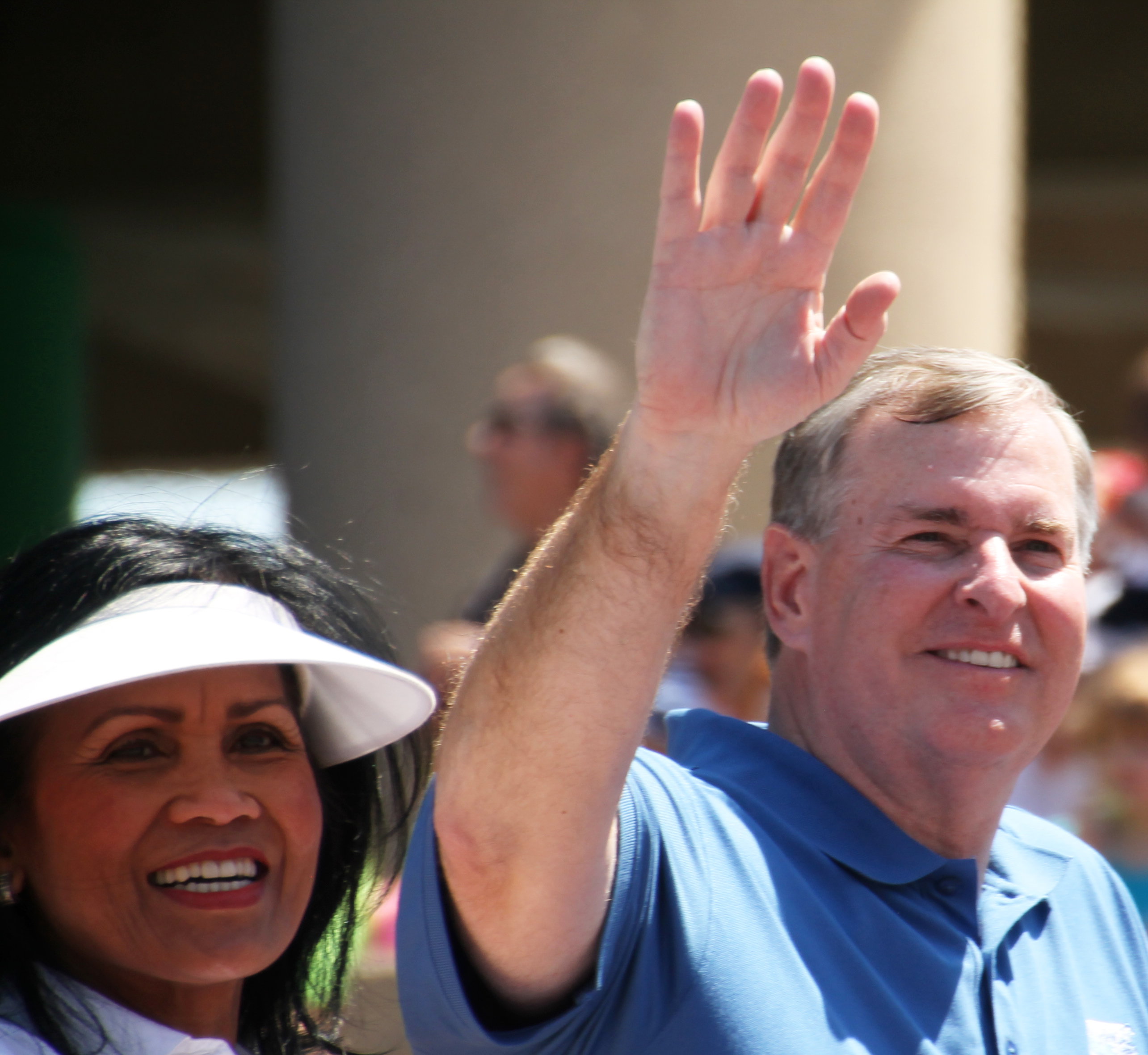
Ballard with wife, Winnie, at the 2015 500 Festival Parade

Ballard was sworn into office on Tuesday, January 1, 2008, at the Indiana War Memorial, in downtown Indianapolis. Ballard chose this site saying that it honored the men and women of the armed services. Ballard said his first act as mayor would be to put the Indianapolis Metropolitan Police Department back under mayoral control, instead of its then-current control by Marion County Sheriff Frank J. Anderson.

In October 2008, Ballard announced the creation of the city's first Office of Sustainability and unveiled the SustainIndy initiative. The community-wide plan is focused on taking local action to be more environmentally conscious. In August 2010, Ballard and the Office of Sustainability announced a program to provide incentives for property owners and developers to renovate or construct new buildings in a sustainable manner.

On September 9, 2010, Ballard announced the first batch of projects in the city's RebuildIndy initiative. The $55 million package of street, sidewalk and bridge projects is spread around the city, with many side streets selected for resurfacing as well as some major roads. Ballard also announced a $2 million set of projects to improve traffic flow and pedestrian access in targeted areas along Michigan Road from Cold Springs Road to 86th Street—a stretch with few sidewalks—and along 71st Street and Westlane Road in the same area. The projects kicked off an aggressive infrastructure improvement program. The mayor's office anticipated spending more than $500 million on such projects in coming years, largely funded by proceeds from the then-pending sale of the city's water and sewer systems to the nonprofit trust Citizens Energy Group and stimulus money. Among its selling points for Ballard is the money to fund infrastructure improvements—though Ballard has said the city's needs are so great that the money won't cover them all.

The Ballard administration took steps to sell the city's water and wastewater utilities to Citizens Energy Group and spend the $450 million the city received in return on street repair. Improvements included paving, resurfacing, new sidewalks, more greenways, and bridge repair.

On August 19, the city of Indianapolis announced it had received $13.8 million more than originally expected from a bond issue secured by the pending sale of its water and sewer utilities to Citizens Energy Group—$153.8 million compared with the $140 million originally anticipated. The money was to be spent on street, bridge, and sidewalk projects under the city's “RebuildIndy” program. That brought total proceeds from selling the utilities—before subtracting fees and other costs related to the sale—to $504.4 million, up from $490.6 million anticipated when the City-County Council approved the sale.

Ballard was reelected to a second term in 2011, defeating former Deputy Mayor Melina Kennedy, 51% to 47%, a difference of 7,531 votes. The Indianapolis City-County elections took place alongside the mayoral election, with Democrats taking a 16–13 majority. This marked the first time in Indianapolis history that a Republican mayor would lead with a Democratic council.

On December 12, 2012, Ballard signed Executive Order #6, making Indianapolis the first major city in the United States to commit to the conversion of its entire municipal non-police fleet to electric or plug-in hybrid vehicles. The mayor also outlined a plan to convert the entire city government vehicle fleet to post-oil technology by 2025. Ballard cited concern over the compromises to national security created by national oil dependence as the reasoning behind this step in energy security. Ballard stated that his team was working with automakers to have the Indianapolis Metropolitan Police Department serve as technical advisors and test drivers to accelerate the creation of the first plug-in hybrid police vehicle that meets the needs of a modern urban police force. Such a fleet could save up to $10 million per year.

== Campaign for Indiana Secretary of State ==
In March 2026 Ballard announced his campaign for Indiana Secretary of State, citing disappointment with the policies of the incumbent Secretary of State Diego Morales.

Ballard ran under a ballot line for a new party called the "Lincoln Party," seeking to gain ballot access for the party and its candidates in future elections. Ballard lost the election to Democrat Beau Bayh. Although Ballard did not win the election, he received at least 2% of the vote, thereby earning the Lincoln Party official minor party status in Indiana and ballot access for the next four years.

After the election, Ballard joined Secretary of State–elect Bayh's transition team as an advisor.

== Personal life ==
Ballard is married to Winnie Ballard; together they have a son and a daughter, both of whom are Indiana University graduates. He is an avid golfer.

Political offices
Preceded by Bart Peterson	Mayor of Indianapolis; 2008–2016	Succeeded by Joe Hogsett
