= 2003 Indianapolis mayoral election =

Mayoral election in Indianapolis, Indiana (2003)

- November 4, 2003
- Turnout: 26.81% ▼10.17pp
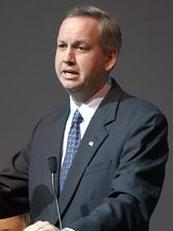

Nominee	Bart Peterson	Greg Jordan
Party	Democratic	Republican
Popular vote	92,763	55,354
Percentage	62.62%	37.37%
Mayor before election
Bart Peterson
Democratic
Elected mayor
Bart Peterson
Democratic

The Indianapolis mayoral election of 2003 took place on November 4, 2003. Voters elected the Mayor of Indianapolis, members of the Indianapolis City-County Council, as well as several other local officials. Incumbent Democrat Bart Peterson was reelected to a second term.

== Primaries ==
Primaries were held on May 6.

=== Democratic primary ===
Indianapolis mayoral election, 2003
Party	Candidate	Votes	%
Democratic	Bart Peterson (incumbent)	25,406	93.96
Democratic	Karen Beck	1,633	6.04
Majority		23,773	87.92
Turnout		27,039	

=== Republican primary ===
Indianapolis mayoral election, 2003
Party	Candidate	Votes	%
Republican	Greg Jordan	24,150	100
Turnout		24,150	

== Polling ==
Poll source	Date(s) administered	Sample size (Note: Key: A – all adults RV – registered voters LV – likely voters CV – certain voters V – unclear)	Margin of error	Bart Peterson (D)	Greg Jordan (R)	Other / Undecided
SurveyUSA	October 31 – November 2, 2003	413 (CV)	± 4.8%	62%	34%	4%

== Election results ==
Peterson won reelection by a large margin.

2003 was a good year for Democrats in Indiana's mayoral elections, with the party winning control of the mayoralties of all of the state's top seven most populous cities for the first time since 1959. The Democratic Party also won control of the mayoralties in twenty of the state's thirty cities with populations above 25,000. Additionally, in 2003, Democrats won more than 56% of partisan mayoral races in Indiana.

During the general election, Marion County, saw voter turnout of 27% in its various elections.

Indianapolis mayoral election, 2003
Party	Candidate	Votes	%
Democratic	Bart Peterson (incumbent)	92,763	62.62
Republican	Greg Jordan	55,354	37.37
Independent	John Leroy Plemons	13	0.01
Majority		37,409	25.25
Turnout		148,130	
Democratic hold			

Preceded by 1999	Indianapolis mayoral election 2003	Succeeded by 2007
