= Summer Advantage USA =

Nonprofit organization in Indiana, United States

Summer Advantage USA is a national non-profit organization providing elementary and middle school students living in low–performing school districts with research-based summer learning programs focused on academic gains.

== Overview and history ==
Summer Advantage USA was launched in January 2009 in Indiana by Earl Martin Phalen, who founded the organization in September 2008 and is its CEO.

Phalen originally cofounded a community service outreach organization known as BELL (Building Educated Leaders for Life) in June 1993.
