= Sue Anne Gilroy =

American politician who served as the Secretary of State of Indiana

58th Secretary of State of Indiana
- In office December 1, 1994 – December 1, 2002
- Governor: Evan Bayh; Frank O'Bannon
- Preceded by: Joe Hogsett
- Succeeded by: Todd Rokita

Personal details
- Born: June 28, 1948 (age 78) Crawfordsville, Indiana, U.S.
- Party: Republican

Sue Anne Gilroy (born June 28, 1948) is an American politician who served as the Secretary of State of Indiana from 1994 to 2002. She was the Republican nominee for Mayor of Indianapolis in 1999, but she lost to Bart Peterson. She is a graduate of DePauw University and she earned a master's degree in public administration from IUPUI.

Party political offices
Preceded by William H. Hudnut III	Republican nominee for Secretary of State of Indiana; 1994, 1998	Succeeded by Todd Rokita
Preceded by Stephen Goldsmith	Republican nominee for Mayor of Indianapolis; 1999	Succeeded by Greg Jordan
