= 2011 Indianapolis City-County Council election =

Indianapolis City-County Council elections, 2011
- November 8, 2011

All 29 seats on the Indianapolis City-County Council 15 seats needed for a majority
	Majority party	Minority party
Leader	Joanne Sanders (retiring)	Mike McQuillen
Party	Democratic	Republican
Leader's seat	At-large (did not run for re-election)	District 4
Last election	13 seats	16 seats
Seats before	13 seats	15 seats
Seats won	16 seats	12 seats

The 2011 Indianapolis City–County Council elections took place on November 8, 2011. All 29 seats were up for re-election, 25 districts and 4 at-large seats, on the Indianapolis City–County Council. Prior to the elections Republicans held a 15–13–1 seat majority. Following the elections Democrats gained control of the council with a 16–13 majority. This marked the first time in Indianapolis history that a Republican mayor would lead with a Democratic council.

The Indianapolis mayoral election took place alongside the council elections.

== Results by district ==
City-County Council District 1
Party	Candidate	Votes	%	±%
Democratic	José Evans (incumbent)	4,797	54.4%	+5.1%
Republican	Susan Blair	3,764	42.7%	−5.1%
Libertarian	Michael Bishop	256	2.9%	—
Turnout		8,817		
Democratic hold		Swing		

City-County Council District 2
Party	Candidate	Votes	%	±%
Democratic	Angela Mansfield (incumbent)	4,741	60.7%	+8.6%
Republican	Anthony Simons	2,817	35.9%	−12.0%
Libertarian	Sam Goldstein	269	3.4%	+3.4%
Turnout		7,827		
Democratic hold		Swing		

City-County Council District 3
Party	Candidate	Votes	%	±%
Republican	Ryan Vaughn (incumbent)	5,830	57.4%	−7%
Democratic	Len Farber	4,320	42.6%	+7%
Turnout		10,150		
Republican hold		Swing		

City-County Council District 4
Party	Candidate	Votes	%	±%
Republican	Christine Scales (incumbent)	4,880	50.2%	−1.1%
Democratic	Kostas Poulakidas	4,841	49.8%	+1.1%
Turnout		9,721		
Republican hold		Swing		

City-County Council District 5
Party	Candidate	Votes	%	±%
Republican	Virginia Cain (incumbent)	6,089	67.5%	−32.5
Democratic	Jackie Butler	2,711	30.0%	+30%
Libertarian	Christopher Hodapp	228	2.5%	+2.5%
Turnout		9,028		
Republican hold		Swing		

City-County Council District 6
Party	Candidate	Votes	%	±%
Republican	Janice McHenry (incumbent)	3,368	52.2%	−8.1%
Democratic	Brett Voorhies	2,905	45.1%	+5.4%
Libertarian	Kevin Fleming	175	2.7%	+2.7%
Turnout		6,448		
Republican hold		Swing		

City-County Council District 7
Party	Candidate	Votes	%	±%
Democratic	Maggie A. Lewis (incumbent)	3,640	62.6%	−37.4%
Republican	Sahara Williams	1,991	34.3%	+34.3%
Libertarian	Matthew Stone	181	3.1%	+3.1%
Turnout		5,812		
Democratic hold		Swing		

City-County Council District 8
Party	Candidate	Votes	%	±%
Democratic	Monroe Gray, Jr. (incumbent)	6,363	69.4%	+12.3%
Republican	Stu Rhodes	2,807	30.6%	−12.3%
Turnout		9,170		
Democratic hold		Swing		

City-County Council District 9
Party	Candidate	Votes	%	±%
Democratic	Joe Simpson	5,700	81.1%	−18.9%
Republican	Sally Spiers	980	13.9%	+13.9%
Independent	Jeramy Townsley	350	5.0%	+5.0%
Turnout		7,030		
Democratic hold		Swing		

City-County Council District 10
Party	Candidate	Votes	%	±%
Democratic	William Oliver (incumbent)	3,654	78.3%	−21.7%
Republican	Barbara Holland	856	18.3%	+18.3%
Libertarian	Joell Palmer	160	3.4%	+3.4%
Turnout		4,670		
Democratic hold		Swing		

City-County Council District 11
Party	Candidate	Votes	%	±%
Democratic	Steve Talley	5,348	66.4%	+6.3%
Republican	Mike Healy	2,502	31.0%	−8.9%
Libertarian	Tom Mulcahy	206	2.6%	+2.6%
Turnout		8,056		
Democratic hold		Swing		

City-County Council District 12
Party	Candidate	Votes	%	±%
Republican	Michael McQuillen (incumbent)	4,137	49.3%	−8.5%
Democratic	Regina Marsh	3,975	47.4%	+5.2%
Libertarian	Shawn Sullivan	275	3.3%	+3.3%
Turnout		8,387		
Republican hold		Swing		

City-County Council District 13
Party	Candidate	Votes	%	±%
Republican	Robert Lutz (incumbent)	3,718	60.3%	−5.5%
Democratic	Jared Evans	2,236	36.3%	+4.7%
Libertarian	Jason Sipe	209	3.4%	+0.8%
Turnout		6,163		
Republican hold		Swing		

City-County Council District 14
Party	Candidate	Votes	%	±%
Republican	Mariliyn Pfisterer (incumbent)	2,323	55.3%	−5.9%
Democratic	Maxine King	1,874	44.7%	+5.9%
Turnout		4,197		
Republican hold		Swing		

City-County Council District 15
Party	Candidate	Votes	%	±%
Democratic	Vop Osili	4,415	80.6%	−19.4%
Republican	A. J. Feeney-Ruiz	912	16.7%	+16.7%
Libertarian	Zachary Capehart	149	2.7%	+2.7%
Turnout		5,476		
Democratic hold		Swing		

City-County Council District 16
Party	Candidate	Votes	%	±%
Democratic	Brian Mahern (incumbent)	1,754	64.8%	+3.3%
Republican	Bill Bruton	953	35.2%	+0.1%
Turnout		2,707		
Democratic hold		Swing		

City-County Council District 17
Party	Candidate	Votes	%	±%
Democratic	Mary Moriarty Adams (incumbent; died, after her service on the Council, on September 6, 2018)	3,820	65.6%	+13.7%
Republican	Gary Whitmore	2,000	34.4%	−13.7%
Turnout		5,820		
Democratic hold		Swing		

City-County Council District 18
Party	Candidate	Votes	%	±%
Democratic	Vernon Brown (incumbent)	3,940	67.3%	+10.7%
Republican	Michael Heady	1,919	32.7%	−10.7%
Turnout		5,859		
Democratic hold		Swing		

City-County Council District 19
Party	Candidate	Votes	%	±%
Republican	Jeff Miller	1,675	52.5%	+4.1%
Democratic	Dane Mahern (incumbent)	1,515	47.5%	−4.1%
Turnout		3,190		
Republican gain from Democratic		Swing		

City-County Council District 20
Party	Candidate	Votes	%	±%
Democratic	Frank Mascari	2,829	52.5%	+10.2%
Republican	N. Susie Day (incumbent)	2,556	47.5%	−6.5%
Turnout		5,385		
Democratic gain from Republican		Swing		

City-County Council District 21
Party	Candidate	Votes	%	±%
Republican	Benjamin Hunter (incumbent)	4,451	55.8%	−8.6%
Democratic	Todd Woodmansee	3,111	39.1%	+3.5%
Libertarian	Josh Featherstone	410	5.1%	+5.1%
Turnout		7,972		
Republican hold		Swing		

City-County Council District 22
Party	Candidate	Votes	%	±%
Republican	Jason Holliday	4,978	67.8%	+2.9%
Democratic	Doug White	2,362	32.2%	+0.2%
Turnout		7,340		
Republican hold		Swing		

City-County Council District 23
Party	Candidate	Votes	%	±%
Republican	Jeff Cardwell (incumbent)	5,030	71.2%	−2.2%
Democratic	Scott Coxey	1,790	25.3%	−1.3%
Libertarian	Kent Raquet	248	3.5%	+3.5%
Turnout		7,068		
Republican hold		Swing		

City-County Council District 24
Party	Candidate	Votes	%	±%
Republican	Jack Sandlin (incumbent)	4,762	75.7%	−24.3%
Libertarian	Ed Coleman	1,532	24.3%	+24.3%
Turnout		6,294		
Republican hold		Swing		

City-County Council District 25
Party	Candidate	Votes	%	±%
Republican	Aaron Freeman (incumbent)	8,613	70.3%	−29.7%
Democratic	Mario Garza	3,078	25.1%	+25.1%
Libertarian	Kevin Vail	561	4.6%	+4.6%
Turnout		12,252		
Republican hold		Swing		

City-County Council At-large
Party	Candidate	Votes	%	±%
Democratic	John Barth	87,984	13.0%	+1.2%
Democratic	Pamela Hickman	86,754	12.8%	+1.3%
Democratic	Zach Adamson	84,946	12.5%	+1.2%
Democratic	Leroy Robinson	81,112	12.0%	+1.8%
Republican	Barbara Malone (incumbent)	78,774	11.6%	−1.3%
Republican	Angel Rivera (incumbent)	74,871	11.0%	−1.4%
Republican	Jacqueline Cissell	74,514	11.0%	−0.6%
Republican	Michael Kalscheur	72,227	10.6%	−0.9%
Libertarian	Bill Levin	10,081	1.5%	−0.5%
Libertarian	Sheri Meinert	9,836	1.5%	−0.5%
Libertarian	Patrick Culley	9,249	1.4%	−0.1%
Libertarian	Reid Roberts Miller	7,441	1.1%	−0.2%
Turnout		181,168	30%	+4%

Preceded by 2007	Indianapolis City-County Council elections 2011	Succeeded by 2015
